= Hamburger Meile =

- Class: Group 3
- Location: Horner Rennbahn; Hamburg, Germany
- Inaugurated: 1986
- Race type: Flat / Thoroughbred
- Website: Hamburg

Race information
- Distance: 1,600 metres (1 mile)
- Surface: Turf
- Track: Right-handed
- Qualification: Three-years-old and up
- Weight: 55½ kg (3yo); 60 kg (4y+); Allowances; 1½ kg for fillies and mares 1 kg if not won €25,000 (4y+) * 2 kg if not won €12,500 (4y+) * * since January 1
- Purse: €55,000 (2012); 1st: €32,000

The Hamburger Meile was a Group 3 flat horse race in Germany open to thoroughbreds aged three years or older. It was run at Hamburg-Horn over a distance of 1,600 metres (about 1 mile), and was scheduled to take place each year in June or July.

The race was last run at Hamburg-Horn in 2011, being moved to Hanover in 2012. However a very similar event, the Group Two Meilen Trophy, was run at the same course only three weeks later, and this race and the Hamburger Stutenmeile (restricted to fillies and mares), has since been kept at the expense of the Hamburger Meile.

== History ==
The event was established in 1986, and it was initially called the Cognac Hennessy-Rennen. It was originally classed at Listed level and contested over 1,600 metres. It was extended to 1,800 metres in 1987, and reverted to 1,600 metres in 1989.

The race was known as the Hamburg Dresden-Pokal in the early 1990s. It lost Listed status in 1992, and had various sponsored titles thereafter.

The Hamburger Meile regained Listed status in 2000, and was promoted to Group 3 level in 2002. From this point it was called the Deutscher Herold-Preis. It was subsequently known as the JAXX-Pokal and the Franz-Günther von Gaertner-Gedachtnisrennen.

The race was held at Hanover under the title Grosser Preis der VGH Versicherungen in 2012.

== Records ==
Most successful horse (2 wins):

- Power Flame – 1997, 1998
- Up and Away – 2001, 2003
- Earl of Fire – 2009, 2010

Leading jockey (2 wins):

- Georg Bocskai – Babylonier (1986), Caracobi (1987)
- Andreas Suborics – Sinyar (1995), El Divino (2000)
- Andrasch Starke – La Blue (1996), Sambaprinz (2004)
- Andreas Boschert – Power Flame (1997, 1998)
- Lennart Hammer-Hansen – Up and Away (2001, 2003)
- Dominique Boeuf – Earl of Fire (2009, 2010)

Leading trainer (4 wins):

- Bruno Schütz – Saphir (1988), Amarant (1993), Sinyar (1995), La Blue (1996)

== Winners ==
Year	Winner	Age	Jockey	Trainer	Time
1986	Babylonier	3	Georg Bocskai	Heinz Jentzsch	1:39.60
1987	Caracobi	3	Georg Bocskai	Heinz Jentzsch	1:53.20
1988	Saphir	3	Lutz Mäder	Bruno Schütz	1:54.40
1989	Reason to Rock	3	Peter Alafi	Harro Remmert	1:38.40
1990	Glayva	3	Lester McGarrity	Bruce Hellier	1:41.90
1991	Waky Na	3	Olaf Schick	Hans Blume	1:42.10
1992	Fleet for Europe	3	Alan Bond	Peter Lautner	1:38.90
1993	Amarant	3	Andre Best	Bruno Schütz	1:37.40
1994	Erminius	3	Kevin Woodburn	Peter Rau	1:38.40
1995	Sinyar	3	Andreas Suborics	Bruno Schütz	1:37.70
1996	La Blue	3	Andrasch Starke	Bruno Schütz	1:40.30
1997	Power Flame	4	Andreas Boschert	Andreas Wöhler	1:39.20
1998	Power Flame	5	Andreas Boschert	Andreas Wöhler	1:44.70
1999	Kalatos	7	Alexander Brockhausen	Heinz Jentzsch	1:40.20
2000	El Divino	5	Andreas Suborics	Mario Hofer	1:42.20
2001	Up and Away	7	L. Hammer-Hansen	Erika Mäder	1:40.70
2002	Zarewitsch	3	Filip Minarik	Peter Schiergen	1:43.42
2003	Up and Away	9	L. Hammer-Hansen	Erika Mäder	1:32.09
2004	Sambaprinz	5	Andrasch Starke	Horst Horwart	1:41.44
2005	Areias	7	Terence Hellier	Andreas Schütz	1:40.15
2006	Lateral	3	William Mongil	Peter Schiergen	1:35.75
2007	König Turf	5	Torsten Mundry	Christian Sprengel	1:45.30
2008	Sehrezad	3	Jiri Palik	Andreas Löwe	1:38.24
2009	Earl of Fire	4	Dominique Boeuf	Werner Baltromei	1:34.55
2010	Earl of Fire	5	Dominique Boeuf	Werner Baltromei	1:35.60
2011	Alianthus	6	Adrie de Vries	Jens Hirschberger	1:34.88
2012	Empire Storm ^{[a]}	5	Eduardo Pedroza	Andreas Wöhler	1:44.84

^{a} The 2012 running took place at Hanover.

== See also ==
- List of German flat horse races
