= Grand Prix-Aufgalopp =

- Class: Listed
- Location: Köln-Weidenpesch; Cologne, Germany
- Race type: Flat / Thoroughbred
- Sponsor: Sauren Dachfonds
- Website: Köln-Weidenpesch

Race information
- Distance: 2,100 metres (1m 2½f)
- Surface: Turf
- Track: Right-handed
- Qualification: Four-years-old and up
- Weight: 56 kg Allowances; 1½ kg for fillies and mares 1½ kg if not Group placed * Penalties; 4 kg for Group 1 winners * 3 kg for Group 2 winners * 2 kg for Group 3 winners * 1 kg for Listed winners * * since January 1 last year
- Purse: €20,000 (2013); 1st: €13,000

The Grand Prix-Aufgalopp is a Listed flat horse race in Germany open to thoroughbreds aged four years or older. It is run over a distance of 2,100 metres (about 1 mile and 2½ furlongs) at Cologne in April.

== History ==
The event was formerly titled the Moormann-Rennen. It was usually contested over 1,800 or 2,000 metres at Dortmund.

The race was transferred to Cologne and renamed the Grand Prix-Aufgalopp in 1986. It was initially run over 1,900 metres and classed at Listed level. It was extended to 2,200 metres in 1990, and promoted to Group 3 status in 2007.

The Grand Prix-Aufgalopp became known as the Grand Prix Premiere in 2010. It was shortened to 2,100 metres in 2011. It returned to Listed level and reverted to its previous title in 2012.

== Records ==
Most successful horse (2 wins):

- Dschingis Khan – 1965, 1966
- Revlon Boy – 1982, 1983
- Friedland – 1992, 1993

Leading jockey (5 wins):

- Fritz Drechsler – Prinz Aga (1959), Naretha (1963), Bacchus (1969), Basalt (1971), Lombard (1972)
- Terence Hellier – Germany (1995), Turbo Drive (1998), Pyromaniac (1999), Damiano (2000), Oriental Tiger (2008)

Leading trainer (14 wins):

- Heinz Jentzsch – Dschingis Khan (1965, 1966), Priamos (1968), Bacchus (1969), Basalt (1971), Lombard (1972), Schiwago (1973), Mirando (1974), Whip It Quick (1976, dead-heat), Aschanti (1979), Shepard (1981), El Arco (1984), Los Rinos (1990), Concepcion (1996)

== Winners since 1980 ==
Year	Winner	Age	Jockey	Trainer	Time
1980	Peloponnes	5	Dave Richardson	Horst Degner	1:55.40
1981	Shepard	6	Manfred Hofer	Heinz Jentzsch	1:54.00
1982	Revlon Boy	6	Lutz Mäder	Hein Bollow	1:53.20
1983	Revlon Boy	7	Lutz Mäder	Hein Bollow	1:58.80
1984	El Arco	4	José Orihuel	Heinz Jentzsch	1:50.80
1985	Fürst Igor	5	Erwin Schindler	Bruno Schütz	1:57.70
1986	Our Martin	7	Dicke Persson	Lennart Reuterskiöld	2:02.00
1987	Ajouni	5	Bernd Selle	Andreas Löwe	2:08.20
1988	Medicus	4	Lutz Mäder	Bruno Schütz	2:06.90
1989	New Moon	8	Dragan Ilic	Peter Lautner	2:06.40
1990	Los Rinos	4	Andrzej Tylicki	Heinz Jentzsch	2:26.60
1991	Taishan	5	Dragan Ilic	Raimund Prinzinger	2:27.90
1992	Friedland	4	Lester Piggott	Trond Hansen	2:34.70
1993	Friedland	5	John Reid	Georg Ording	2:23.80
1994	Fergano	6	Kevin Woodburn	Jürg Studer	2:31.30
1995	Germany	4	Terence Hellier	Bruno Schütz	2:30.40
1996	Concepcion	6	Peter Schiergen	Heinz Jentzsch	2:23.20
1997	Leconte	6	Torsten Mundry	Manfred Weber	2:25.70
1998	Turbo Drive	4	Terence Hellier	Andreas Schütz	2:31.30
1999	Pyromaniac	5	Terence Hellier	Peter Lautner	2:35.40
2000	Damiano	4	Terence Hellier	Peter Schiergen	2:35.60
2001	Tempelwächter	7	Andrasch Starke	Heinz Hesse	2:41.20
2002	Simoun	4	Filip Minarik	Peter Schiergen	2:30.70
2003	Fleurie Domaine	4	Jean-Pierre Carvalho	Mario Hofer	2:32.25
2004	Grantley	7	Norman Richter	Heinz Hesse	2:27.80
2005	no race
2006	Gandolfino ^{[a]}	4	Andreas Boschert	Werner Baltromei	2:47.30
2007	Egerton	6	Torsten Mundry	Peter Rau	2:21.72
2008	Oriental Tiger	5	Terence Hellier	Uwe Ostmann	2:33.39
2009	Ostland	4	Andrasch Starke	Peter Schiergen	2:22.87
2010	Appel au Maitre	6	Jan-Erik Neuroth	Wido Neuroth	2:22.86
2011	Illo	5	Adrie de Vries	Jens Hirschberger	2:16.68
2012	Mighty Mouse	4	Frederik Tylicki	Pavel Vovcenko	2:21.58
2013	Shoshoni	6	Koen Clijmans	Axel Kleinkorres	2:14.44

^{a} The 2006 edition was run over 2,400 metres.

== Earlier winners ==
- 1953: Almeido
- 1954: Preusse
- 1955: no race
- 1956: Solotänzerin *
- 1957: Adjag
- 1958: Liperion
- 1959: Prinz Aga
- 1960: Feuereifer
- 1961: Thiggo
- 1962: Dornkaat
- 1963: Naretha
- 1964: Taunus
- 1965: Dschingis Khan
- 1966: Dschingis Khan
- 1967: Goldbube
- 1968: Priamos
- 1969: Bacchus
- 1970: Ernani
- 1971: Basalt
- 1972: Lombard
- 1973: Schiwago
- 1974: Mirando
- 1975: Teotepec
- 1976: My Brief / Whip It Quick **
- 1977: Wladimir
- 1978: Wasso
- 1979: Aschanti

* The 1956 running was a 1,000-metre race for two-year-olds.
** The 1976 race was a dead-heat and has joint winners.

== See also ==
- List of German flat horse races
