= Badener Meile =

Flat horse race in Germany

- Class: Group 3
- Location: Iffezheim Racecourse; Baden-Baden, Germany
- Inaugurated: 1979
- Race type: Flat / Thoroughbred
- Website: Baden-Baden

Race information
- Distance: 1,600 metres (1 mile)
- Surface: Turf
- Track: Left-handed
- Qualification: Three-years-old and up
- Weight: 52 kg (3yo); 58 kg (4y+); Allowances; 1½ kg for fillies and mares 1 kg if not won €12,000 (4y+) * Penalties; 3 kg for Group 1 winners * 2 kg for Group 2 winners * 1 kg for Group 3 winners * * since May 1 last year
- Purse: €70,000 (2022); 1st: €40,000

The Badener Meile is a Group 3 flat horse race in Germany open to thoroughbreds aged three years or older. It is run over a distance of 1,600 metres (about 1 mile) at Baden-Baden in May or June.

== History ==
A different event called the Badener Meile was established at Baden-Baden in 1927. It was renamed the Oettingen-Rennen in 1970.

The current Badener Meile was introduced in 1979. It was initially restricted to horses aged four or older. It was opened to three-year-olds in 1985. It was promoted to Group 2 class in 2015.

== Records ==
Most successful horse:

- no horse has won this race more than once

Leading jockey (3 wins):

- Andrasch Starke – Chato (1995), Waky Nao (1998), Aspectus (2009)
- Adrie de Vries – Wiesenpfad (2008), Alianthus (2011), Nica (2020)

Leading trainer (3 wins):

- Heinz Jentzsch – Bonito (1979), Sharp End (1984), Zampano (1989)

== Winners ==
Year	Winner	Age	Jockey	Trainer	Time
1979	Bonito	5	Ralf Suerland	Heinz Jentzsch	1:40.40
1980	Peloponnes	5	Dave Richardson	Horst Degner	1:39.50
1981	Aspros	4	Peter Remmert	Theo Grieper	1:39.80
1982	Torgos	6	Peter Alafi	Fredy Scheffer	1:38.20
1983	Mir Bal	4	Jacques Heloury	Philippe Lallié	1:48.60
1984	Sharp End	6	Georg Bocskai	Heinz Jentzsch	1:40.90
1985	Sulaafah	3	Tony Murray	Harry Thomson Jones	1:38.30
1986	Sarab	5	Richard Quinn	Paul Cole	1:40.70
1987	Krotz	4	Guy Guignard	Jonathan Pease	1:41.20
1988	Island Reef	4	Andrzej Tylicki	Lennart Jarven	1:39.30
1989	Zampano	5	Andrzej Tylicki	Heinz Jentzsch	1:36.51
1990	Mirror Black	4	John Reid	Peter Makin	1:36.09
1991	Bin Shaddad	7	Lutz Mäder	Erika Mäder	1:39.52
1992	Young Moon	6	John McLaughlin	David Smith	1:37.43
1993	Karinga Bay	6	Brian Rouse	Gary L. Moore	1:38.30
1994	Port Lucaya	4	Jason Weaver	Richard Hannon, Sr.	1:44.30
1995	Chato	3	Andrasch Starke	Horst Steinmetz	1:41.52
1996	Sinyar	4	Terence Hellier	Bruno Schütz	1:44.82
1997	La Blue	4	Billy Newnes	Bruno Schütz	1:38.07
1998	Waky Nao	5	Andrasch Starke	Andreas Schütz	1:37.56
1999	Docksider	4	Michael Hills	John Hills	1:38.63
2000	Kalatos	8	Alexander Brockhausen	Harro Remmert	1:42.67
2001	El Lute	7	Andreas Boschert	Dragan Ilic	1:39.45
2002	Touch Down	4	Jimmy Quinn	Dave Richardson	1:39.67
2003	Zarewitsch	4	Filip Minařík	Peter Schiergen	1:41.08
2004	Bear King	7	Norman Richter	Christian Sprengel	1:38.96
2005	Tiganello	4	Davy Bonilla	Freddy Head	1:39.96
2006	Idealist	4	Andreas Suborics	Peter Schiergen	1:42.33
2007	Banknote	5	Franny Norton	Andrew Balding	1:37.09
2008	Wiesenpfad	5	Adrie de Vries	Waldemar Hickst	1:37.65
2009	Aspectus	6	Andrasch Starke	Torsten Mundry	1:40.71
2010	Abbashiva (Note: The 2010 and 2021 runnings took place at Düsseldorf)	5	Eugen Frank	Torsten Mundry	1:35.57
2011	Alianthus	6	Adrie de Vries	Jens Hirschberger	1:37.51
2012	Worthadd	5	Mirco Demuro	Sir Mark Prescott	1:37.74
2013	Felician	5	Lennart Hammer-Hansen	Ferdinand Leve	1:40.90
2014	Red Dubawi	6	Eddy Hardouin	Frau Erika Mader	1:38.11
2015	Amaron	6	Andrasch Starke	Andreas Lowe	1:37.13
2016	Royal Solitaire	4	Daniele Porcu	Peter Schiergen	1:38.52
2017	Palace Prince	5	Filip Minařík	Jean-Pierre Carvalho	1:35.38
2018	Stormy Antarctic	5	Pat Cosgrave	Ed Walker	1:40.17
2019	The Revenant	4	Ronan Thomas	Francis-Henri Graffard	1:38.77
2020	Nica	5	Adrie de Vries	Dr Andreas Bolte	1:40.65
2021	Jin Jin	5	Bauyrzhan Murzabayev	Andreas Suborics	1:35.42
2022	Best Lightning	4	Martin Seidl	Andreas Suborics	1:36.94
2023	Calif	4	Adrie de Vries	Peter Schiergen	1:38.13
2024	Arcandi	4	Bauyrzhan Murzabayev	Peter Schiergen	1:45.59
2025	Short Final	5	Ioritz Mendizabal	Satoshi Kobayashi	1:39.43
2026	Sir Tommy Cen	4	Aurelien Lemaitre	Patrik Olave Vladivielso	1:39.52

== See also ==
- List of German flat horse races
