= Preis der Winterkönigin =

- Class: Group 3
- Location: Iffezheim Racecourse; Baden-Baden, Germany
- Inaugurated: 1959
- Race type: Flat / Thoroughbred
- Website: Baden-Baden

Race information
- Distance: 1,600 metres (1 mile)
- Surface: Turf
- Track: Left-handed
- Qualification: Two-year-old fillies
- Weight: 58 kg
- Purse: €105,000 (2021); 1st: €60,000

The Preis der Winterkönigin is a Group 3 flat horse race in Germany open to two-year-old thoroughbred fillies. It is run at Baden-Baden over a distance of 1,600 metres (about 1 mile), and it is scheduled to take place each year in October.

The event was established in 1959, and it was originally held at Mülheim. It was introduced as a fillies' counterpart to the Preis des Winterfavoriten at Cologne. It was initially contested over 1,400 metres, and was extended to 1,600 metres in 1973.

For a period the Preis der Winterkönigin was classed at Listed level. It was given Group 3 status in 2001. The race was transferred to Baden-Baden in 2004.

== Records ==
Leading jockey (5 wins):

- Terence Hellier – Martessa (1990), White on Red (1994), Sommernacht (1999), Sorrent (2004), Love Academy (2007)
- Andrasch Starke - Narooma (2001), Night Lagoon (2003), Swordhalf (2012), Noble Heidi (2020), Shagara (2023)

Leading trainer (10 wins):

- Heinz Jentzsch – Brisanz (1961), Dolce Vita (1969), Toscarina (1972), Akita (1973), Istria (1979), Operette (1980), Opium (1981), La Colorada (1983), Schwarz-Grün (1984), Quebrada (1992)

== Winners since 1980 ==
Year	Winner	Jockey	Trainer	Time
1980	Operette	Peter Remmert	Heinz Jentzsch	1:37.80
1981	Opium	Ralf Suerland	Heinz Jentzsch	1:40.30
1982	Tannenalm	Peter Alafi	Sven von Mitzlaff	1:35.80
1983	La Colorada	Georg Bocskai	Heinz Jentzsch	1:38.30
1984	Schwarz-Grün	Georg Bocskai	Heinz Jentzsch	1:48.00
1985	Sängerin	Peter Remmert	Hein Bollow	1:38.90
1986	Nuas	Dave Richardson	Theo Grieper	1:38.80
1987	Alte Zeit	Olaf Schick	Uwe Ostmann	1:43.20
1988	Diasprina	Dave Richardson	Theo Grieper	1:46.90
1989	Well Known	Alan Freeman	Theo Grieper	1:42.60
1990	Martessa	Terence Hellier	Andreas Wöhler	1:44.50
1991	Keniana	Kevin Woodburn	Uwe Ostmann	1:42.40
1992	Quebrada	Andrzej Tylicki	Heinz Jentzsch	1:38.30
1993	Wild Romance	Mark Rimmer	Bruno Schütz	1:47.10
1994	White on Red	Terence Hellier	Bruno Schütz	1:42.70
1995	Massada	Waldemar Hickst	Harro Remmert	1:43.70
1996	Oriental Flower	Georg Bocskai	Uwe Ostmann	1:44.32
1997	Glady Beauty	Georg Bocskai	Uwe Ostmann	1:39.31
1998	Miss Tobacco	Pascal van de Keere	Ralf Suerland	1:43.66
1999	Sommernacht	Terence Hellier	Peter Schiergen	1:40.02
2000	Bedford Set	Andreas Helfenbein	Horst Steinmetz	1:39.20
2001	Narooma	Andrasch Starke	Andreas Schütz	1:44.18
2002	Royal Dubai	Eduardo Pedroza	Andreas Wöhler	1:36.77
2003	Night Lagoon	Andrasch Starke	Andreas Schütz	1:44.59
2004	Sorrent	Terence Hellier	Andreas Schütz	1:43.86
2005	Nordtänzerin	William Mongil	Peter Schiergen	1:43.15
2006	Shane	Andreas Helfenbein	Andreas Löwe	1:41.63
2007	Love Academy	Terence Hellier	Peter Schiergen	1:41.87
2008	Sworn Pro	Andreas Helfenbein	Mario Hofer	1:43.42
2009	Neon Light	Jozef Bojko	Andreas Wöhler	1:43.65
2010	Djumama	Adrie de Vries	Andreas Löwe	1:48.34
2011	Monami	Jozef Bojko	Andreas Wöhler	1:40.99
2012	Swordhalf	Andrasch Starke	Andreas Wöhler	1:42.58
2013	Diamond Dove	Andre Best	Andreas Löwe	1:49.72
2014	Bourree	Jozef Bojko	Andreas Löwe	1:45.04
2015	Dhaba	Adrie de Vries	Markus Klug	1:43.86
2016	Well Spoken	Adrie de Vries	Markus Klug	1:47.26
2017	Rock My Love	Adrie de Vries	Markus Klug	1:51.88
2018	Whispering Angel	Martin Seidl	Markus Klug	1:39.84
2019	Ocean Fantasy	Michael Cadeddu	Jean-Pierre Carvalho	1:48.01
2020	Noble Heidi	Andrasch Starke	Henk Grewe	1:43.32
2021	Lizaid	Bauyrzhan Murzabayev	Peter Schiergen	1:42.87
2022	Quantanamera	Martin Seidl	Andreas Suborics	1:44.58
2023	Shagara	Andrasch Starke	Markus Klug	1:42.22
2024	Nicoreni	Sibylle Vogt	Peter Schiergen	1:47.08
2025	Alsterperle	Martin Seidl	Maxim Pecheur	1:41.39

== Earlier winners ==
- 1959: Ankerkette
- 1960: Alisma
- 1961: Brisanz
- 1962: no race
- 1963: Little Lady
- 1964: Sturmwoge
- 1965: no race
- 1966: Roswitha
- 1967: Ordinanz
- 1968: Friedensbotschaft
- 1969: Dolce Vita
- 1970: Orpheline
- 1971: Lady Arc
- 1972: Toscarina
- 1973: Akita
- 1974: Ordinale
- 1975: Eirene
- 1976: Anserma
- 1977: Plantage
- 1978: Alaria
- 1979: Istria

== See also ==
- List of German flat horse races
