= Oettingen-Rennen =

Flat horse race in Germany

- Class: Group 2
- Location: Iffezheim Racecourse; Baden-Baden, Germany
- Inaugurated: 1927
- Race type: Flat / Thoroughbred
- Sponsor: Darley
- Website: Baden-Baden

Race information
- Distance: 1,600 metres (1 mile)
- Surface: Turf
- Track: Left-handed
- Qualification: Three-years-old and up
- Weight: 55 kg (3y); 57½ kg (4y+); Allowances; 1½ kg for fillies and mares Penalties; 3 kg for Group 1 winners * 1½ kg for Group 2 winners * * since August 1 last year
- Purse: €65,000 (2021); 1st: €37,000

The Oettingen-Rennen is a Group 2 flat horse race in Germany open to thoroughbreds aged three years or older. It is run at Baden-Baden over a distance of 1,600 metres (about 1 mile), and it is scheduled to take place each year in late August or early September.

== History ==
The event was established in 1927, and it was originally known as the Badener Meile. It was renamed the Oettingen-Rennen in 1970, and for a period it held Group 3 status. A different race called the Badener Meile was created in 1979.

Darley Stud started to sponsor the Oettingen-Rennen in 1999. The race was promoted to Group 2 level in 2003.

== Records ==
Most successful horse (2 wins):

- Enak – 1933, 1934
- Campanile – 1960, 1961
- Novalis – 1964, 1965
- Pas de Deux – 2016, 2017

Leading jockey (4 wins):

- Kurt Narr – Teutone (1928), Enak (1933, 1934), Kameradschaftler (1938)
- Peter Remmert – Campanile (1961), Oberbootsmann (1966), Bussard (1968), Aspros (1981)
- Terence Hellier – Zabar (1993), Waky Nao (1997), Bernardon (2000), Martillo (2005)

Leading trainer (4 wins):

- Albert Schlaefke – Enak (1933, 1934), Wacholdis (1951), Der Unhold (1954)

== Winners since 1972 ==
Year	Winner	Age	Jockey	Trainer	Time
1972	Rubens	3	Uwe Mathony	H. Danner	1:39.80
1973	Garzer	4	Peter Alafi	Anton Pohlkötter	1:37.20
1974	Ace of Aces	4	Lester Piggott	Maurice Zilber	1:37.10
1975	Baly Rockette	3	Georges Doleuze	Charlie Milbank	1:38.00
1976	Antuco	4	Joan Pall	Heinz Jentzsch	1:39.40
1977	Vivi	5	Georg Bocskai	Oskar Langner	1:41.10
1978	Gracioso	4	Jean-Pierre Lefèvre	Henri Gleizes	1:37.90
1979	Slenderhagen	3	Ralf Suerland	Heinz Jentzsch	1:42.10
1980	Miner's Lamp	3	Steve Cauthen	Barry Hills	1:38.40
1981	Aspros	4	Peter Remmert	Theo Grieper	1:38.30
1982	Spanish Pool	3	Brian Taylor	Jeremy Hindley	1:39.40
1983	Drumalis	3	John Matthias	Ian Balding	1:38.30
1984	Hoyer	3	Tony Murray	Harry Thomson Jones	1:39.30
1985	Hot Rodder	4	Lester Piggott	John Dunlop	1:37.50
1986	Eve's Error	3	Tony Kimberley	Michael Stoute	1:40.00
1987	Neshad	3	Paul Cook	Michael Stoute	1:40.60
1988	Patriach	6	Gary W. Moore	John Dunlop	1:41.90
1989	Val des Pres	5	Olivier Poirier	Élie Lellouche	1:41.60
1990	Last Midnight	3	Marc de Smyter	Jonathan Pease	1:39.00
1991	Enharmonic	4	Steve Cauthen	Lord Huntingdon	1:38.14
1992	Acteur Francais	4	Sylvain Guillot	André Fabre	1:43.18
1993	Zabar	5	Terence Hellier	Jonathan Pease	1:35.88
1994	Royal Abjar	3	Walter Swinburn	Andreas Wöhler	1:40.64
1995	A Magicman	3	Neil Grant	Hartmut Steguweit	1:43.31
1996	La Blue	3	Andrasch Starke	Bruno Schütz	1:36.78
1997	Waky Nao	4	Terence Hellier	Bruno Schütz	1:37.33
1998	Power Flame	5	Andreas Boschert	Andreas Wöhler	1:37.78
1999	White Heart	4	John Reid	Mark Johnston	1:37.17
2000	Bernardon	4	Terence Hellier	Peter Schiergen	1:39.40
2001	Up and Away	7	L. Hammer-Hansen	Erika Mäder	1:38.58
2002	Zarewitsch	3	Andreas Suborics	Peter Schiergen	1:38.10
2003	Passing Glance	4	Martin Dwyer	Andrew Balding	1:37.38
2004	Pepperstorm	3	Andreas Boschert	Uwe Ostmann	1:41.77
2005	Martillo	5	Terence Hellier	Ralf Suerland	1:37.62
2006	Notability	4	Philip Robinson	Michael Jarvis	1:44.86
2007	Mi Emma	3	Andreas Boschert	Andreas Wöhler	1:36.20
2008	Lovelace	4	Jamie Spencer	Mark Johnston	1:39.85
2009	Premio Loco	5	George Baker	Chris Wall	1:38.00
2010	Emerald Commander	3	Frankie Dettori	Saeed bin Suroor	1:39.54
2011	Shamalgan	4	Filip Minařík	Arslangirej Savujev	1:37.48
2012	Highland Knight	5	David Probert	Andrew Balding	1:38.55
2013	Gereon	5	Liam Jones	Christian Zschache	1:38.96
2014	Here Comes When	4	David Probert	Andrew Balding	1:42.48
2015	Vadamos	4	Vincent Cheminaud	André Fabre	1:38.52
2016	Pas de Deux	6	Stephen Hellyn	Yasmin Almenrader	1:40.12
2017	Pas de Deux	7	Stephen Hellyn	Yasmin Almenrader	1:40.39
2018	Ancient Spirit	3	Filip Minařík	Jean-Pierre Carvalho	1:38.74
2019	Vintager	4	William Buick	Charlie Appleby	1:38.39
2020	Dark Vision	4	Franny Norton	Mark Johnston	1:38.65
2021	Rodaballo	4	Jose Luis Martinez	Guillermo Arizkorreta Elosegui	1:39.18
2022	Dapango	3	Thore Hammer Hansen	Roland Dzubasz	1:41.06
2023	Calif	4	Rene Piechulek	Peter Schiergen	1:41.64
2024	Penalty	3	Thore Hammer Hansen	Henk Grewe	1:36.84
2025	Geography	4	Andrasch Starke	Peter Schiergen	1:36.12
2026	Loucas	3	Rene Piechulek	Waldemar Hickst	1:38.32

== Earlier winners ==
- 1927: Palü
- 1928: Teutone
- 1929: Oberwinter
- 1930: Dianthus
- 1931: Laotse
- 1932: Orkadier
- 1933: Enak
- 1934: Enak
- 1935: Andante
- 1936: Wiener Walzer
- 1937: Fidelitas
- 1938: Kameradschaftler
- 1939: Reichsfürst
- 1940: no race
- 1941: Meertaucher
- 1942: Flying Call
- 1943: Figaro
- 1944: Pionier
- 1945–47: no race
- 1948: Salvator
- 1949–50: no race
- 1951: Wacholdis
- 1952: Maud
- 1953: Don Juan
- 1954: Der Unhold
- 1955: Zobel
- 1956: Lauffeuer
- 1957: Prinz Aga
- 1958: Magliaso
- 1959: Nettuno
- 1960: Campanile
- 1961: Campanile
- 1962: Oceana
- 1963: Parabola
- 1964: Novalis
- 1965: Novalis
- 1966: Oberbootsmann
- 1967: Pasteur
- 1968: Bussard
- 1969: Avance
- 1970: Fred Babu
- 1971: Rocket

== See also ==
- List of German flat horse races
