= Euro-Cup =

- Class: Group 3
- Location: Frankfurt Racecourse; Frankfurt, Germany
- Final run: 20 September 2009
- Race type: Flat / Thoroughbred
- Website: Frankfurt

Race information
- Distance: 2,000 metres (1¼ miles)
- Surface: Turf
- Track: Left-handed
- Qualification: Three-years-old and up
- Weight: 55½ kg (3yo); 58 kg (4yo+); Allowances; 1½ kg for fillies and mares Penalties; 3 kg for Group 1 winners * 2 kg for Group 2 winners * 1 kg for Group 3 winners * * since January 1
- Purse: €50,000 (2009); 1st: €32,000

The Euro-Cup was a Group 3 flat horse race in Germany open to thoroughbreds aged three years or older. It was run at Frankfurt over a distance of 2,000 metres (about 1¼ miles), and it was scheduled to take place each year in September.

== History ==
The event was contested over 2,000 metres in 1986 and 1987. It was extended to 2,200 metres and given Group 3 status in 1988. From this point it was called the Team Trophy and sponsored by the German Cooperative Financial Group.

The race was promoted to Group 2 level in 1989. It was cut to 2,100 metres in 1990, and to 2,000 metres in 1991.

The event became known as the Made in Europe-Trophy in 1995, and the Flughafen Frankfurt-Trophy in 1997. It was renamed the Henninger-Trophy and increased to 2,050 metres in 1999. It was titled the Arthur Andersen Euro-Cup in 2000.

The race was run at Cologne over 1,850 metres in 2001. That year's edition was called the Preis des Bankhaus Sal. Oppenheim.

The Euro-Cup returned to Frankfurt with a distance of 2,000 metres in 2002. Subsequent sponsors included Ernst & Young and Merrill Lynch.

The race was downgraded to Group 3 level in 2007. It was last run in 2009.

== Records ==
Most successful horse:

- no horse won this race more than once in the period shown

Leading jockey since 1986 (4 wins):

- Andrasch Starke – Bad Bertrich (1994), Oxalagu (1998), Elle Danzig (2000), Fight Club (2005)

Leading trainer since 1986 (4 wins):

- Peter Schiergen – Catella (1999), Walzerkoenigin (2002), Soldier Hollow (2004), Nordtänzerin (2006)

== Winners since 1986 ==
Year	Winner	Age	Jockey	Trainer	Time
1986	Kyros	4	Manfred Hofer	Harro Remmert	2:05.70
1987	Katmai	4	Peter Alafi	Harro Remmert	1:59.80
1988	Highland Chieftain	5	John Reid	John Dunlop	2:16.02
1989	Medicus	5	Manfred Hofer	Bruno Schütz	2:18.50
1990	Starlet	4	John Reid	Lord Huntingdon	2:08.92
1991	Goofalik	4	Bruce Raymond	John Hammond	2:05.45
1992	George Augustus	4	John Reid	John Oxx	2:08.35
1993	Komtur	3	Kevin Woodburn	Harro Remmert	2:06.22
1994	Bad Bertrich	3	Andrasch Starke	Bruno Schütz	2:13.86
1995	Hushang	5	Johnny Murtagh	John Oxx	2:09.74
1996	Artan	4	Ray Cochrane	Martin Rölke	2:10.48
1997	Crystal Hearted	3	Tony McGlone	Henry Candy	2:07.02
1998	Oxalagu	6	Andrasch Starke	Andreas Schütz	2:14.72
1999	Catella	3	Andreas Suborics	Peter Schiergen	2:07.12
2000	Elle Danzig	5	Andrasch Starke	Andreas Schütz	2:12.29
2001	Denaro ^{[a]}	3	Andreas Suborics	Christian von der Recke	2:01.38
2002	Walzerkoenigin	3	Filip Minařík	Peter Schiergen	2:05.78
2003	Frühlingssturm	3	Torsten Mundry	Peter Rau	2:05.36
2004	Soldier Hollow	4	William Mongil	Peter Schiergen	2:13.91
2005	Fight Club	4	Andrasch Starke	Andreas Schütz	2:06.64
2006	Nordtänzerin	3	Filip Minařík	Peter Schiergen	2:10.55
2007	Shrek	3	Eduardo Pedroza	Andreas Wöhler	2:03.26
2008	Zaungast	4	Eugen Frank	Waldemar Hickst	2:07.40
2009	Querari	3	Johan Victoire	Andreas Wöhler	2:14.07

^{a} The 2001 running took place at Cologne.

== See also ==
- List of German flat horse races
