= Badener Sprint-Cup =

- Class: Group 3
- Location: Iffezheim Racecourse; Baden-Baden, Germany
- Inaugurated: 1985
- Final run: 25 October 2009
- Race type: Flat / Thoroughbred
- Website: Baden-Baden

Race information
- Distance: 1,400 metres (7f)
- Surface: Turf
- Track: Left-handed
- Qualification: Three-years-old and up
- Weight: 56½ kg (3y); 57½ kg (4y+); Allowances; 1½ kg for fillies and mares 1 kg if not won €12,000 * Penalties; 3 kg for Group 1 winners * 2 kg for Group 2 winners * 1 kg for Group 3 winners * * since January 1
- Purse: €50,000 (2009); 1st: €30,000

The Badener Sprint-Cup was a Group 3 flat horse race in Germany open to thoroughbreds aged three years or older. It was run at Baden-Baden over a distance of 1,400 metres (about 7 furlongs), and it was scheduled to take place each year in October.

== History ==
The event was originally called the Grosser Sprint-Preis, and it used to be staged at Munich. It was established in 1985, and it was initially contested over 1,300 metres. For a period it held Listed status.

The Grosser Sprint-Preis was promoted to Group 3 level in 1998. It was transferred to Baden-Baden and renamed the Badener Sprint-Cup in 2004. From this point its distance was 1,400 metres.

The race was last run in 2009. It was replaced the following year by the Badener Ladies Sprint Cup, a Listed event for fillies and mares.

== Records ==
Most successful horse (2 wins):

- Silicon Bavaria – 1990, 1991
- Tomba – 1998, 1999
- Soave – 2002, 2005

Leading jockey (2 wins):

- Peter Schiergen – Smaragd (1985), Macanal (1995)
- David Wildman – Brigantin (1986), Bannier (1992)
- Olivier Poirier – Allius (1988), Silicon Bavaria (1991)
- Bruce Raymond – Savahra Sound (1989), Silicon Bavaria (1990)
- Terence Hellier – Areias (2004), Chantilly Tiffany (2008)

Leading trainer (2 wins):

- Erich Pils – Brigantin (1986), Bannier (1992)
- Robert Collet – Silicon Bavaria (1990, 1991)
- Brian Meehan – Tomba (1998, 1999)
- Andreas Trybuhl – Soave (2002, 2005)

== Winners ==
Year	Winner	Age	Jockey	Trainer	Time
1985	Smaragd	3	Peter Schiergen	Theo Grieper	1:17.60
1986	Brigantin	4	David Wildman	Erich Pils	1:18.30
1987	Sylvan Express	4	Greville Starkey	Philip Mitchell	1:18.00
1988	Allius	5	Olivier Poirier	Alain Falourd	1:20.76
1989	Savahra Sound	4	Bruce Raymond	Richard Hannon Sr.	1:25.51
1990	Silicon Bavaria	3	Bruce Raymond	Robert Collet	1:18.00
1991	Silicon Bavaria	4	Olivier Poirier	Robert Collet	1:22.30
1992	Bannier	5	David Wildman	Erich Pils	1:21.58
1993	Sharp Prod	3	Lester Piggott	Lord Huntingdon	1:19.50
1994	Takin	3	Lutz Mäder	Erika Mäder	1:21.60
1995	Macanal	3	Peter Schiergen	Heinz Jentzsch	1:18.30
1996	Branston Abby	7	Michael Roberts	Mark Johnston	1:21.00
1997	Gaelic Symphony	4	Peter Heugl	Mario Hofer	1:24.10
1998	Tomba	4	Pat Eddery	Brian Meehan	1:20.90
1999	Tomba	5	Michael Tebbutt	Brian Meehan	1:21.80
2000	Tertullian	5	Filip Minarik	Peter Schiergen	1:23.00
2001	Miss Gazon	3	Frédéric Sanchez	John Hammond	1:19.60
2002	Soave	3	Gary Hind	Andreas Trybuhl	1:24.18
2003	König Shuffle	7	Darren Moffatt	Martin Rölke	1:23.39
2004	Areias	6	Terence Hellier	Andreas Schütz	1:26.80
2005	Soave	6	Andreas Boschert	Andreas Trybuhl	1:27.64
2006	Garnica	3	Ioritz Mendizabal	Jean-Claude Rouget	1:24.50
2007	Ricine	5	François-Xavier Bertras	François Rohaut	1:24.82
2008	Chantilly Tiffany	4	Terence Hellier	Ed Dunlop	1:27.12
2009	Walero	3	Pascal Werning	Uwe Ostmann	1:28.14

== See also ==
- List of German flat horse races
- Recurring sporting events established in 1985 – this race is included under its original title, Grosser Sprint-Preis.
