= Diana-Trial =

- Class: Group 3
- Location: Hoppegarten Racecourse; Hoppegarten, Germany
- Race type: Flat / Thoroughbred
- Website: Hoppegarten

Race information
- Distance: 2,000 metres (1¼ miles)
- Surface: Turf
- Track: Right-handed
- Qualification: Three-year-old fillies
- Weight: 58 kg
- Purse: €55,000 (2022); 1st: €32,000

The Diana-Trial is a group 3 flat horse race in Germany, open to three-year-old thoroughbred fillies. It is run over a distance of 2,000 metres (about 1¼ miles) at Hoppegarten in May or June. The race downgraded to Group 3 in 2022

== History ==
The event serves as a trial for the Preis der Diana. It was formerly named after the joint winners of that race in 1984, Las Vegas and Slenderella. It was originally contested at Mülheim over 2,100 or 2,200 metres.

For a period the Las Vegas-Slenderella-Rennen was classed at Listed level. It became known as the Diana-Trial in the late 1990s. It was given Group 3 status in 2004, and from this point it was run at Cologne as the Schwarzgold-Rennen. It was promoted to Group 2 in 2006.

The race reverted to the title Diana-Trial in 2008. It was transferred to Hoppegarten with a new distance of 2,000 metres in 2009.

The last winner of the race to achieve victory in the Preis der Diana was Iota in 2005.

== Records ==
Leading jockey (8 wins):

- Andrasch Starke – Night Petticoat (1996), Borgia (1997), Flamingo Road (1999), Lilac Queen (2001), Miss Europa (2009), Nightflower (2015), Wagnis (2022), Kassada (2023)

Leading trainer (5 wins):

- Peter Schiergen - Alpha City (1995), Iota (2005), Miss Europa (2009), Longina (2014), Nightflower (2015)

== Winners ==
Year	Winner	Jockey	Trainer	Time
1986	Leopoldina	Georg Bocskai	Heinz Jentzsch	2:28.50
1987	Tawinja	Kevin Woodburn	Hartmut Steguweit	2:24.20
1988	Mosella	Wolfgang Härtl	Uwe Ostmann	2:14.20
1989	Aragosta	Olaf Schick	Uwe Ostmann	2:17.80
1990	Eicidora	Mark Rimmer	Josef Kappel	2:21.90
1991	Couronne	Andreas Boschert	Hartmut Steguweit	2:16.70
1992	Arastou	Kevin Woodburn	Uwe Ostmann	2:15.00
1993	Arkona	Olaf Schick	Hans Blume	2:12.00
1994	Theophanu	Kevin Woodburn	Harro Remmert	2:15.00
1995	Alpha City	Peter Schiergen	Heinz Jentzsch	2:19.00
1996	Night Petticoat	Andrasch Starke	Bruno Schütz	2:30.10
1997	Borgia	Andrasch Starke	Bruno Schütz	2:29.20
1998	Santenay	Kevin Woodburn	Harro Remmert	2:27.90
1999	Flamingo Road	Andrasch Starke	Andreas Schütz	2:24.40
2000	Quezon City	Terence Hellier	Peter Schiergen	2:19.50
2001	Lilac Queen	Andrasch Starke	Andreas Schütz	2:21.80
2002	Salve Regina	Lennart Hammer-Hansen	Andreas Schütz	2:19.50
2003	Mandela	William Mongil	Ralf Suerland	2:20.50
2004	Amarette	Andreas Suborics	Andreas Schütz	2:17.90
2005	Iota	Terence Hellier	Peter Schiergen	2:27.73
2006	Quelle Amore	Eduardo Pedroza	Andreas Wöhler	2:21.46
2007	Scatina	Andreas Suborics	Mario Hofer	2:24.31
2008	Baila Me	Dominique Boeuf	Werner Baltromei	2:20.71
2009	Miss Europa	Andrasch Starke	Peter Schiergen	2:05.10
2010	Vanjura	Alexander Pietsch	Roland Dzubasz	2:06.40
2011	Selkis	Viktor Schulepov	Jens Hirschberger	2:05.00
2012	Monami ^{[a]}	Jozef Bojko	Andreas Wöhler	2:04.80
2013	Ars Nova	Andrea Atzeni	Wolfgang Figge	2:04.90
2014	Longina	Adrie de Vries	Peter Schiergen	2:02.3
2015	Nightflower	Andrasch Starke	Peter Schiergen	2:03.2
2016	Meergorl	Frederik Tylicki	Roland Dzubasz	2:04.5
2017	Tusked Wings	Filip Minarik	Jean-Pierre Carvalho	2:10.5
2018	Well Timed	Filip Minarik	Jean-Pierre Carvalho	2:06.27
2019	Akribie	Adrie de Vries	Markus Klug	2:00.15
2020	Kalifornia Queen	Clement Lecoeuvre	Henk Grewe	2:04.50
2021	Amazing Grace	Rene Piechulek	Waldemar Hickst	2:04.48
2022	Wagnis	Andrasch Starke	Markus Klug	2:02.09
2023	Kassada	Andrasch Starke	Markus Klug	2:03.43
2024	Erle	Martin Seidl	Maxim Pecheur	1:57.12
2025	Lady Charlotte	Adrie de Vries	A Wohler	2:08.90
2026	Gua Lipa	Andrea Ricupa	Andreas Suborics	2:04.54

^{a} Monami was disqualified after winning in 2012, but the original result was restored after an appeal.

== See also ==
- List of German flat horse races
