= Grosser Preis von LOTTO Hamburg =

The Holstein Cup is a Group 3 flat horse race in Germany open to thoroughbreds aged three years or older. It is run at Hamburg-Horn over a distance of 2,000 metres (about 10 furlongs), and it is scheduled to take place each year in July.

The race was first run in 2013, as the Hamburg Trophy, a name previously used for the 1200m race at the same meeting, now known as the Flieger Trophy. It was later run as the Holstein Cup before the current title was adopted in 2018.

== Winners ==
Year	Winner	Age	Jockey	Trainer	Time
2013	Neatico	6	Andrasch Starke	Peter Schiergen	2:06.69
2014	Bermuda Reef	4	Adrie de Vries	Peter Schiergen	2:08.27
2015	Wake Forest	5	Eduardo Pedroza	Andreas Wohler	2:08.30
2016	Articus	4	Marc Lerner	Waldemar Hickst	2:06.66
2017	Matchwinner	6	Stephen Hellyn	A Kleinkorres	2:19.46
2018	Devastar	6	Adrie de Vries	Markus Klug	2:07.54
2019	King David	4	Marc Stott	Oliver Wilson	2:08.36
2020	K Club^{1}	4	Martin Seidl	Erika Mader	1:13.52
2021	Majestic Colt^{1}	6	Eduardo Pedroza	A Wohler	1:12.24
2022	Danelo^{1}	4	Jozef Bojko	A Wohler	1:11.97
2023	No Race
2024	Atoso	5	Lilli-Marie Engels	Sarka Schutz	2:18.08
2025	Quest The Moon	9	Rene Piechulek	S Steinberg	2:16.98
2026	Seguro	3	Benjamin Marie	Andreas Suborics	2:17.92

1 Races were at 6 furlongs.

== See also ==
- List of German flat horse races
