= Meilen-Trophy =

Meilen-Trophy Grosser Preis vom Audi Zentrum Hannover
- Class: Group 3
- Location: Hanover Racecourse; Hanover, Germany
- Inaugurated: 1991
- Race type: Flat / Thoroughbred
- Sponsor: Audi Zentrum Hannover
- Website: Hanover

Race information
- Distance: 1,600 metres (1 mile)
- Surface: Turf
- Track: Left-handed
- Qualification: Three-years-old and up
- Weight: 54 kg (3yo); 58 kg (4yo+); Allowances; 1½ kg for fillies and mares Penalties; 3 kg for Group 1 winners * 1½ kg for Group 2 winners * * since August 1 last year
- Purse: €70,000 (2012); 1st: €40,000

The Meilen-Trophy is a Group 3 flat horse race in Germany open to thoroughbreds aged three years or older. It is run at a variety of German racecourses over a distance of 1,600 metres (about 1 mile), and it is scheduled to take place in July of each year.

== History ==
The event was established in 1991, and it was originally held at Hoppegarten. It was initially given Group 3 status, and was promoted to Group 2 level in 1994. For a period it was called the Berlin Brandenburg-Trophy.

The race's venue has rotated between several German courses since 2005. It has been contested at Cologne (2005–06, 2017), Hanover (2007–08, 2010, 2012, 2014-15), Düsseldorf (2009, 2011, 2016) and Krefeld (2013). During this period it has been run under several different titles.

The race was run under the title Fritz Henkel Stiftung-Rennen from 2020-2022 and is currently run under the title Fritz Henkel-Preis since 2023.

== Records ==
Most successful horse (2 wins):
- Martillo – 2003, 2004
- Geography - 2024, 2025

Leading jockey (5 wins):

- Andrasch Starke – Irish Stew (1992), Waky Nao (1998), Royal Dragon (2001), Diplomat (2018), Geography (2025)

Leading trainer (4 wins):

- Peter Schiergen – Arcadio (2006), Sahib's Joy (2022), Geography (2024), Geography (2025)

== Winners until 2004 ==
Year	Winner	Age	Jockey	Trainer	Time
1991	Flying Brave	3	John Reid	John Dunlop	1:35.80
1992	Irish Stew	4	Andrasch Starke	Hans Blume	1:36.60
1993	Quebrada	3	Peter Schiergen	Heinz Jentzsch	1:39.80
1994	Torch Rouge ^{[a]}	3	Willie Carson	Barry Hills	1:33.90
1995	Kill the Crab	3	Mark Larsen	Wido Neuroth	1:33.60
1996	Manzoni	4	Andreas Boschert	Andreas Wöhler	1:36.10
1997	Gothenburg	4	Jason Weaver	Mark Johnston	1:37.60
1998	Waky Nao	5	Andrasch Starke	Andreas Schütz	1:37.40
1999	Docksider	4	Michael Hills	John Hills	1:33.20
2000	Slip Stream	4	Paul Eddery	Saeed bin Suroor	1:38.00
2001	Royal Dragon	3	Andrasch Starke	Andreas Schütz	1:37.50
2002	Sambaprinz	3	Jiri Palik	Horst Horwart	1:42.60
2003	Martillo	3	William Mongil	Ralf Suerland	1:36.80
2004	Martillo	4	William Mongil	Ralf Suerland	1:39.40

^{a} Royal Abjar finished first in 1994, but he was later disqualified after testing positive for a banned substance.

== Winners since 2005 ==
Year	Course	Winner	Age	Jockey	Trainer	Time
2005	Cologne	Eagle Rise	5	Terence Hellier	Andreas Schütz	1:36.47
2006	Cologne	Arcadio	4	Andreas Suborics	Peter Schiergen	1:40.68
2007	Hanover	Apollo Star	5	Andreas Helfenbein	Mario Hofer	1:38.36
2008	Hanover	Fothe Millionkiss	4	Andreas Helfenbein	Uwe Ostmann	1:39.56
2009	Dusseldorf	King of Sydney	3	Andreas Suborics	Mario Hofer	1:37.70
2010	Hanover	Sehrezad	5	Jiri Palik	Andreas Löwe	1:36.88
2011	Dusseldorf	Alianthus	6	Adrie de Vries	Jens Hirschberger	1:38.78
2012	Hanover	Sir Oscar	5	Adrie de Vries	Toni Potters	1:41.28
2013	Krefel	Felician	5	Lennart Hammer-Hansen	Ferdinand J Leve	1:43.07
2014	Hanover	Red Dubawi	6	Eddy Hardouin	Frau Erika Mader	1:39.69
2015	Hanover	Wild Chief	4	Alexander Pietsch	Jens Hirschberger	1:39.39
2016	Dusseldorf	Kaspersky	5	Umberto Rispoli	Endo Botti	1:34.98
2017	Cologne	Dragon Lips	3	Marc Lerner	Andreas Suborics	1:34.10
2018	Cologne	Diplomat	7	Andrasch Starke	Jean-Pierre Carvalho	1:35.25
2019	Dusseldorf	Robin of Navan	6	Alexander Pietsch	Harry Dunlop	1:35.60
2020^{[b]}	Dusseldorf	Sanora	5	Jozef Bojko	Andreas Wöhler	1:36.38
2021^{[c]}	Dusseldorf	Liberty London	5	Eduardo Pedroza	Waldemar Hickst	1:35.17
2022	Dusseldorf	Sahib's Joy	5	Bauyrzhan Murzabayev	Peter Schiergen	1:34.96
2023	Dusseldorf	See Hector	4	Lukas Delozier	Henk Grewe	1:39.73
2024	Dusseldorf	Geography	3	Bauyrzhan Murzabayev	Peter Schiergen	1:33.91
2025	Dusseldorf	Geography	4	Andrasch Starke	Peter Schiergen	1:33.39
2026	Dusseldorf	Sommersby	6	Eduardo Pedroza	Andreas Wöhler	1:35.07

^{b} The race downgraded to Group 3 in 2020.
^{c} The race downgraded to Group 3 in 2020.

== See also ==
- List of German flat horse races
- Recurring sporting events established in 1991 – this race is included under its former title, Berlin Brandenburg-Trophy.
