= German 1,000 Guineas =

Flat horse race in Germany

German 1,000 Guineas Preis der Freunde und Förderer des Düsseldorfer Reiter- und Rennvereins
- Class: Group 2
- Location: Düsseldorf Racecourse; Düsseldorf, Germany
- Inaugurated: 1919
- Race type: Flat / Thoroughbred
- Sponsor: Racebets.com
- Website: Düsseldorf

Race information
- Distance: 1,600 metres (1 mile)
- Surface: Turf
- Track: Right-handed
- Qualification: Three-year-old fillies
- Weight: 58 kg
- Purse: €125,000 (2022); 1st: €70,000

German 1,000 Guineas
2021
Novemba	Sky Angel	Belcarra

Previous years
2020
Lancade	No Limit Credit	Rose Of Kildare
2019
Main Edition	Axana	Shalona
2018
Nyaleti	Malakeh	Go Rose
2017
Unforgetable Filly	Peace In Motion	Arazza
2016
Hawksmoor	Shy Witch	Dynamic Lips
2015
Full Rose	Nymeria	Schutzenpost
2014
Ajaxana	Indian Rainbow	Diamond Dove
2013
Akua'da	Calyxa	Senafe
2012
Electrelane	Cherry Danon	Waldtraut
2011
Lips Poison	Wolkenburg	Temida

2010-2001
2010
Kali	Reine Heureuse	Neon Light
2009
Penny's Gift	Fabiana	Entre Deux Eaux
2008
Briseida	Rosenreihe	Love Of Dubai
2007
Mi Emma	Mystic Lips	Bahama Mama
2006
Lolita	Almerita	Lasira
2005
Anna Monda	Quadrupa	Free Dreams
2004
Shapira	La Ina	Coqueteria

The German 1,000 Guineas is a Group 2 flat horse race in Germany open to three-year-old thoroughbred fillies. It is run at Düsseldorf over a distance of 1,600 metres (about 1 mile), and it is scheduled to take place each year in June.

It is Germany's equivalent of the 1,000 Guineas Stakes, a famous race in England.

== History ==
The event was established in 1919, and it was originally called the Kisasszony-Rennen. It was initially held at Grunewald, and it moved to Hoppegarten in 1923.

The race was renamed the Schwarzgold-Rennen in 1941, in honour of the previous year's winner Schwarzgold. It was cancelled in 1945 and 1946, and it was staged at Cologne and Krefeld in the two years thereafter. It was transferred to Düsseldorf in 1949.

The present system of race grading was introduced in Germany in 1972, and the Schwarzgold-Rennen was classed at Group 3 level. It was promoted to Group 2 status in 1985. The race became known as the ARAG-Preis in 1989, and as the Henkel-Rennen in 1997. It has been run under several different titles since 2006.

== Records ==
Leading jockey (5 wins):

- Otto Schmidt – Petunie (1924), Faustina (1926), Burgbrohl (1927), Ausnahme (1929), Ausflucht (1933)
- Peter Remmert – Alte Liebe (1964), Ankerwinde (1972), Leticia (1980), Majorität (1987), Alte Zeit (1988)

Leading trainer (12 wins):

- Heinz Jentzsch – Brisanz (1962), Bravour (1966), Schönbrunn (1969), Brigida (1975), Licata (1976), Aviatik (1977), Ocana (1978), Leticia (1980), Opium (1982), Slenderella (1984), Comprida (1986), Quebrada (1993)

Leading owner (9 wins):

- Gestüt Schlenderhan – Schwarzgold (1940), Vivere (1942), Aralia (1948), Asterblüte (1949), Bella Donna (1954), Schönbrunn (1969), Brigida (1975), Aviatik (1977), Slenderella (1984)

== Winners since 1968 ==
Year	Winner	Jockey	Trainer	Owner	Time
1968	Ordinanz	Peter Alafi	Sven von Mitzlaff	Gestüt Zoppenbroich	1:53.10
1969	Schönbrunn	Peter Kienzler	Heinz Jentzsch	Gestüt Schlenderhan	1:42.20
1970	Ariadne	Joan Pall	Josef Hochstein	C. Geerz	1:40.30
1971	Dulcia	Joan Pall	Hein Bollow	Gestüt Erlenhof	1:43.60
1972	Ankerwinde	Peter Remmert	Hein Bollow	Gestüt Asta	1:45.40
1973	Oraza	W. Wickert	Georg Zuber	Stall Rosenau	1:39.80
1974	Une Amie	Willie Carson	Theo Grieper	Gestüt Röttgen	1:38.50
1975	Brigida	Ralf Suerland	Heinz Jentzsch	Gestüt Schlenderhan	1:41.10
1976	Licata	Joan Pall	Heinz Jentzsch	Gestüt Webelsgrund	1:40.70
1977	Aviatik	Horst Horwart	Heinz Jentzsch	Gestüt Schlenderhan	1:46.90
1978	Ocana	Joan Pall	Heinz Jentzsch	Gestüt Fährhof	1:45.40
1979	Alaria	Michael Rath	Georg Zuber	Stall Weissenhof	1:48.20
1980	Leticia	Peter Remmert	Heinz Jentzsch	Gestüt Fährhof	1:44.20
1981	Adita	Dave Richardson	Arthur-Paul Schlaefke	Gestüt Ebbesloh	1:45.70
1982	Opium	Georg Bocskai	Heinz Jentzsch	Gestüt Bona	1:44.60
1983	Well Proved	Eric Apter	Theo Grieper	Gestüt Röttgen	1:45.80
1984	Slenderella	Andrzej Tylicki	Heinz Jentzsch	Gestüt Schlenderhan	1:42.00
1985	Grimpola	Manfred Hofer	Uwe Ostmann	Stall Auetal	1:47.60
1986	Comprida	Georg Bocskai	Heinz Jentzsch	Gestüt Fährhof	1:41.30
1987	Majorität	Peter Remmert	Hein Bollow	Gestüt Erlengrund	1:41.50
1988	Alte Zeit	Peter Remmert	Hein Bollow	Stall Mühlengrund	1:38.00
1989	Filia Ardross	Lutz Mäder	Bruno Schütz	Dr Klaus Rohde	1:38.25
1990	Walesiana	Manfred Hofer	Theo Grieper	Gestüt Moritzberg	1:40.05
1991	Kazoo	Walter Swinburn	Bill Watts	Sheikh Mohammed	1:39.86
1992	Princess Nana	Mark Rimmer	Bruno Schütz	Stall Imperator	1:42.19
1993	Quebrada	Andrzej Tylicki	Heinz Jentzsch	Gestüt Fährhof	1:39.77
1994	Life's Luck	Terence Hellier	Bruno Schütz	Stall Marcassargues	1:37.91
1995	Tryphosa	Andreas Boschert	Andreas Wöhler	Gestüt Burg Eberstein	1:37.78
1996	La Blue	Terence Hellier	Bruno Schütz	Gestüt Wittekindshof	1:43.11
1997	Que Belle	Kevin Woodburn	Harro Remmert	Stall Stoof	1:46.82
1998	Elle Danzig	Andrasch Starke	Andreas Schütz	Gestüt Wittekindshof	1:40.11
1999	Rose of Zollern	Torsten Mundry	Peter Rau	Stall Zollern	1:35.52
2000	Crimplene	Philip Robinson	Clive Brittain	Darley Stud	1:35.16
2001	Dakhla Oasis	L. Hammer-Hansen	Andreas Schütz	Gestüt Park Wiedingen	1:37.23
2002	Portella	Eduardo Pedroza	Andreas Löwe	Siegfried Herzig	1:42.54
2003	Diacada	Andreas Suborics	Hans Blume	Gestüt Röttgen	1:37.05
2004	Shapira	Jiri Palik	Andreas Löwe	Stall Granum	1:42.21
2005	Anna Monda	Torsten Mundry	Peter Rau	Gestüt Brümmerhof	1:47.20
2006	Lolita	Andreas Helfenbein	Andreas Löwe	Stall Le Rastaquouere	1:48.64
2007	Mi Emma	Eduardo Pedroza	Andreas Wöhler	Rennstall Darboven	1:38.16
2008	Briseida	Martin Dwyer	Peter Schiergen	Stall Litex	1:36.29
2009	Penny's Gift	Richard Hughes	Richard Hannon, Sr.	Malcolm & Penny Brown	1:39.29
2010	Kali	Adrie de Vries	Waldemar Hickst	Gestüt Park Wiedingen	1:38.04
2011	Lips Poison	Davy Bonilla	Andreas Löwe	Stall Lintec	1:41.03
2012	Electrelane	Jim Crowley	Ralph Beckett	Clipper Logistics	1:40.40
2013	Akua'da	Eduardo Pedroza	Andreas Wohler	Gestut Brummerhof	1:38.95
2014	Ajaxana	Anthony Crastus	Waldemar Hickst	Stall Lucky Owner	1:37.67
2015	Full Rose	Jozef Bojko	Andreas Wohler	Jaber Abdullah	1:39.64
2016	Hawksmoor	James Doyle	Hugo Palmer	Lael Stable	1:37.30
2017	Unforgetable Filly	James Doyle	Hugo Palmer	Dr Ali Ridha	1:35.49
2018	Nyaleti	Joe Fanning	Mark Johnston	3 Batterhams and A Reay	1:36.89
2019	Main Edition	Joe Fanning	Mark Johnston	Saif Ali	1:36.46
2020	Lancade	Adrie de Vries	Yasmin Almenrader	Stall Raffelberg	1:36.08
2021	Novemba	Sibylle Vogt	Peter Schiergen	Gestut Brummerhof	1:35.41
2022	Txope	Aurelien Lemaitre	Philippe Decouz	Ecurie Griezmann	1:35.82
2023	Habana	Eduardo Pedroza	Andreas Wohler	Stiftung Gestut Fahrhof	1:33.21
2024	Darnation	Adrie de Vries	Karl Burke	Newtown Anner Stud Farm	1:37.50
2025	Lady Ilze	Adrie de Vries	Andreas Wohler	Westminster Race Horses GMBH	1:35.04
2026	Timeforshowcasing	Jack Mitchell	Charlie Johnston	Jaber Abdullah	1:36.27

== Earlier winners ==
- 1919: Tulipan
- 1920: Romanze
- 1921: Kamille
- 1922: Casa Bianca
- 1923: Ischida
- 1924: Petunie
- 1925: Melanie
- 1926: Faustina
- 1927: Burgbrohl
- 1928: Contessa Maddalena
- 1929: Ausnahme
- 1930: Stromschnelle
- 1931: Sichel
- 1932: Alemannia
- 1933: Ausflucht
- 1934: Schwarzliesel
- 1935: Dornrose
- 1936: Nereide
- 1937: Iniga Isolani
- 1938: Hannenalt
- 1939: Tatjana
- 1940: Schwarzgold
- 1941: Beresina / Farida *
- 1942: Vivere
- 1943: Mainkur
- 1944: Träumerei
- 1945–46: no race
- 1947: Königswiese
- 1948: Aralia
- 1949: Asterblüte
- 1950: Gitana
- 1951: Muskatblüte
- 1952: Königstreue
- 1953: Naxos
- 1954: Bella Donna
- 1955: Silver City
- 1956: Liebeslied
- 1957: Thila
- 1958: Ivresse
- 1959: Wiesenblüte
- 1960: Santa Cruz
- 1961: Alisma
- 1962: Brisanz
- 1963: Lis
- 1964: Alte Liebe
- 1965: Tigerin
- 1966: Bravour
- 1967: Landeskrone

* The 1941 race was a dead-heat and has joint winners.

== See also ==
- List of German flat horse races
- Recurring sporting events established in 1919 – this race is included under its original title, Kisasszony-Rennen.
