= Hever Golf Rose =

British-bred Thoroughbred racehorse

- Sire: Efisio
- Grandsire: Formidable
- Dam: Sweet Rosina
- Damsire: Sweet Revenge
- Sex: Mare
- Foaled: 22 February 1991
- Country: United Kingdom
- Colour: Bay
- Breeder: Ronald Popely
- Owner: Ronald Popely; M P Hanson; Hever Racing Club
- Trainer: Joe Naughton
- Record: 66: 17-11-10
- Earnings: £676,149

Major wins
- Silberne Peitsche (1994); Premio Melton (1995); Holsten Trophy (1995); King George Stakes (1995); Täby Open Sprint Championship (1995); Goldene Peitsche (1995); Prix de Seine-et-Oise (1995); Prix de l'Abbaye de Longchamp (1995); Prix de Saint-Georges (1997); Prix du Petit Couvert (1997)

Awards
- European Champion Sprinter (1995)
- Last updated on December 27, 2006

Hever Golf Rose (22 February 1991 – September 1999) was a thoroughbred racehorse who was bred and trained in the United Kingdom, and campaigned throughout Europe in a career that lasted from 1993 to 1998. She was a specialist sprinter, showing her best form over distances of five and six furlongs (1000m and 1200m), who was known for her consistency and durability, and was particularly effective on soft ground. In a six-year career, she ran in sixty-six races and won seventeen. In her best season in 1995 she won six Group races and was named European Champion Sprinter. A year after her retirement, Hever Golf Rose died after failing to recover from the anaesthetic following an operation on a joint injury.

== Background ==
Hever Golf Rose was bred by Ronald Popely who named her after his Hever Castle Golf Club. She was sired by Efisio out of the mare Sweet Rosina. Efisio, who was also owned by Popely for part of his stud career, sired the winners of almost a thousand races including twelve at Group One level. Sweet Rosina went on to produce the successful handicappers Go Hever Golf and Play Hever Golf.

Popely sent Hever Golf Rose to the Doncaster St Leger sales as a yearling but bought her in for 6,000 gns when she failed to attract interest. Popely later sold her privately to Michael P Hanson for a reported fee of £100,000.

Hever Golf Rose was trained throughout her career by Joe Naughton at The Durdans stables at Epsom, Surrey. Naughton had begun training in 1991 and Hever Golf Rose was his first important winner. She had many jockeys but was most closely associated with Jason Weaver, who rode her for eleven of her thirteen races in her championship season of 1995.

== Racing career ==
=== 1993: two-year-old season ===
Hever Golf Rose made her debut when finishing fourth in a maiden race at Leicester in May and was runner-up in a similar event at Chepstow in July. In the next sixteen days she recorded her first two wins in a maiden race at Doncaster and a Nursery (a handicap for two-year-olds) at Newmarket.

=== 1994: three-year-old season ===
On her first race as a three-year-old Hever Golf Rose finished last in the Masaka Stakes at Kempton on her first and only start over a mile. Switched back to sprint distance she progressed steadily through handicaps and Listed races, winning three of her remaining thirteen starts, and improving her official rating from 73 to 105. She won handicaps at Newmarket and York and, on the first of her many foreign trips, the Silberne Peitsche (then a Listed race) at Gelsenkirchen.

=== 1995: four-year-old season ===
==== Spring ====
Hever Golf Rose's championship season began with a third place in the Listed Leicestershire Stakes on her second and final race beyond pure sprint distances. She then took her first Group race when she was sent to Rome for the Premio Melton and won by one and a half lengths from Fred Bongusto. Twelve days later she appeared in Germany, running fourth in the Bénazet-Rennen.

==== Summer ====
In June, she was sent to Sweden where she finished fourth in the Taby Varsprint. Hever Golf Rose now began the most successful period of her career, winning seven of her next eight races. After winning a Listed race in Bremen, she stayed in Germany to take the Group Three Holsten Trophy beating Desidera by one and a half lengths.

She returned to England for the King George Stakes at Goodwood for which she started at odds of 10/1. Hever Golf Rose appeared to be struggling and short of space to run in the early stages but produced a "strong burst" of speed in the last quarter mile to come from last to first and win by half a length to the "astonishment" of the spectators. In recording her only career victory on firm ground she set a new track record of 56.25. In the Group One Nunthorpe Stakes at York in August Jason Weaver attempted to make all the running but was caught in the closing stages and finished third to So Factual.

Ten days after the York race she was back in Sweden, where she won the Taby Open Sprint Championship and only three days after that she appeared at Baden-Baden where she led from the start to take the Goldene Peitsche by two lengths from the Haydock Sprint Cup winner Lavinia Fontana.

==== Autumn ====
Hever Golf Rose's next two races took her to France. At Chantilly she was sent off the 11/10 favourite for the Prix de Seine-et-Oise in which she raced prominently and held off the late challenge of Tereshkova to win by a neck. Joe Naughton called her "an amazing filly" after the win, while the press commented on her "remarkable" season. After four races in twenty-five days, Hever Golf Rose was given a "break" of three weeks before her run in the Prix de l'Abbaye de Longchamp.

The race featured a meeting with another four-year-old filly, the French-trained Cherokee Rose, who had won her last four races including the Prix Maurice de Gheest and the Haydock Sprint Cup. Cherokee Rose was sent off the odds on favourite, with Hever Golf Rose starting at 3.1/1. Weaver tracked Eveningperformance in the early stages before moving his filly into the lead two furlongs out. Hever Golf Rose went clear and although Cherokee Rose finished strongly, she could not catch the English filly who recorded her biggest success by a margin of two and a half lengths. The performance was described by Sue Montgomery, writing in the Independent, as a "dazzling solo tour-de-force".

On her final start she was sent to the United States, the sixth country she had visited that year, for the Breeders' Cup Sprint. It was her first race on dirt, although she had encountered the surface in training. Before the race, Joe Naughton paid tribute to his filly's ability to cope with her busy schedule saying that "she really thrives on racing and she travels brilliantly." In the race at Belmont she showed some speed to reach third place in the straight, but faded in the closing stages to finish eighth of the thirteen runners behind Desert Stormer.

=== 1996: five-year-old season ===
Hever Golf Rose failed to win in thirteen starts as five-year-old, despite running prominently in top sprint races all over Europe. She finished second in the Goldene Peitsche, the Holsten Trophy, the King George Stakes, the Taby Varsprint and the Bénazet-Rennen, and third in the July Cup, the Nunthorpe Stakes, the Prix de l'Abbaye and the Premio Omenoni.

After her narrow defeat in the King George Stakes the Independent's correspondent described her as "one of the most willing and popular horses in training."

=== 1997: six-year-old season ===
At six, Hever Golf Rose ran seventeen times in a campaign that ran from April to November. She competed in five different counties and recorded three wins. In May at Longchamp she disputed the lead for most of the way in the Prix de Saint-Georges and ran under pressure in the final furlong to beat Titus Livius by a short neck. In June was sent to Sweden where she went clear in the straight in to win the Täby Varsprint by two lengths. She returned to Longchamp in October for the Prix du Petit Couvert in which she took the lead a furlong out and won by one and a half lengths from the Prix de l'Abbaye winner Kistena.

=== 1998: seven-year-old season ===
Hever Golf Rose was in foal to Danehill in 1998, but still ran in five races. She recorded her last win when taking her second Täby Varsprint in June and ended her career later in the same month when running unplaced in the King's Stand Stakes at Royal Ascot.

== Assessment ==
Hever Golf Rose was voted European Champion Sprinter in the 1995 Cartier Racing Awards.

== Retirement and death ==
Hever Golf Rose was covered by Danehill in spring 1998, before her final year of racing. She gave birth to a colt foal in 1999. In September Hever Golf Rose underwent surgery for a joint injury at Newmarket. She did not recover from the anaesthetic and her death was reported in the Racing Post on 1 October. She was in foal to the 2000 Guineas winner Entrepreneur at the time. Ronald Popely was reportedly too upset to comment; Joe Naughton said "She was a one-off. It is really tragic... She didn't owe anybody anything and was a real star."

== Pedigree ==
Pedigree of Hever Golf Rose (GB), bay mare, 1991
Sire Efisio (GB) 1982	Formidable; 1975	Forli	Aristophanes
Sire Efisio (GB) 1982	Formidable; 1975	Forli	Trevisa
Sire Efisio (GB) 1982	Formidable; 1975	Native Partner	Raise a Native
Sire Efisio (GB) 1982	Formidable; 1975	Native Partner	Dinner Partner
Sire Efisio (GB) 1982	Eldoret; 1976	High Top	Derring-Do
Sire Efisio (GB) 1982	Eldoret; 1976	High Top	Camenae
Sire Efisio (GB) 1982	Eldoret; 1976	Bamburi	Ragusa
Sire Efisio (GB) 1982	Eldoret; 1976	Bamburi	Kilifi
Dam Sweet Rosina (GB) 1975	Sweet Revenge; 1967	Compensation	Gratitude
Dam Sweet Rosina (GB) 1975	Sweet Revenge; 1967	Compensation	Shillelagh
Dam Sweet Rosina (GB) 1975	Sweet Revenge; 1967	Too Much Honey	Honeyway
Dam Sweet Rosina (GB) 1975	Sweet Revenge; 1967	Too Much Honey	Honey Hill
Dam Sweet Rosina (GB) 1975	Welsh Bede; 1964	Welsh Abbot	Abernant
Dam Sweet Rosina (GB) 1975	Welsh Bede; 1964	Welsh Abbot	Sister Sarah
Dam Sweet Rosina (GB) 1975	Welsh Bede; 1964	B And D	Princely Gift
Dam Sweet Rosina (GB) 1975	Welsh Bede; 1964	B And D	Bright Set (Family: 13-e)
