= Herzog von Ratibor-Rennen =

- Class: Group 3
- Location: Krefeld Racecourse; Krefeld, Germany
- Inaugurated: 1876
- Race type: Flat / Thoroughbred
- Sponsor: Wohnstätte Krefeld AG
- Website: Krefeld

Race information
- Distance: 1,700 metres (1m 99y)
- Surface: Turf
- Track: Right-handed
- Qualification: Two-year-olds
- Weight: 58 kg Allowances; 1½ kg for fillies 1½ kg if not won €8,000
- Purse: €55,000 (2012); 1st: €32,000

The Herzog von Ratibor-Rennen is a Group 3 flat horse race in Germany open to two-year-old thoroughbreds. It is run at Krefeld over a distance of 1,700 metres (1 mile and 99 yards), and it is scheduled to take place each year in November.

== History ==
The event was established in 1876, and it was initially called the Deutscher Gestüt-Preis. It was originally run at Hoppegarten over 1,200 metres.

The race was renamed the Herzog von Ratibor-Rennen in the 1890s. It was named after Viktor, Herzog von Ratibor (1818–93), who served as chairman of German racing's Union-Club.

The Herzog von Ratibor-Rennen was extended to 1,400 metres in 1906. It was moved to Grunewald and cut to 1,200 metres in 1918. It was restored to 1,400 metres in 1920, and returned to Hoppegarten in 1925.

The race was cancelled in 1945 and 1946. It was held at Gelsenkirchen in 1947 and Dortmund in 1948. It was transferred to Krefeld in 1949, and from this point was usually staged in September.

For a period the Herzog von Ratibor-Rennen held Listed status. It was relegated to National Listed level in 1993, and regained its former status in 2003. It was promoted to Group 3, switched to November and increased to 1,700 metres in 2008.

== Records ==
Leading jockey (8 wins):

- Georg Bocskai – Königsfels (1980), Abary (1982), Lagunas (1983), Lirung (1984), Zentaurus (1985), Zampano (1986), Belushi (1990), Barlovento (1995)

Leading trainer (14 wins):

- Heinz Jentzsch – Bandit (1965), Hitchcock (1968), Lombard (1969), Sheba (1972), Licata (1975), La Dorada (1976), Trianon (1977), Esclavo (1978), Abary (1982), Lagunas (1983), Lirung (1984), Zentaurus (1985), Zampano (1986), Macanal (1994)

(note: the trainers of some of the early winners are unknown)

== Winners since 1970 ==
Year	Winner	Jockey	Trainer	Time
1970	Bellatrix	Joan Pall	Herbert Cohn	1:32.20
1971	Rubens	Uwe Mathony	H. Danner	1:30.40
1972	Sheba	Fritz Drechsler	Heinz Jentzsch	1:30.80
1973	Meinberg	Horst Horwart	Karl-Heinz Schultze	1:27.90
1974	Kronenkranich	Harro Remmert	Sven von Mitzlaff	1:31.00
1975	Licata	Joan Pall	Heinz Jentzsch	1:27.60
1976	La Dorada	Joan Pall	Heinz Jentzsch	1:26.50
1977	Trianon	Joan Pall	Heinz Jentzsch	1:27.70
1978	Esclavo	Joan Pall	Heinz Jentzsch	1:27.20
1979	Wauthi	Peter Remmert	Theo Grieper	1:26.80
1980	Königsfels	Georg Bocskai	Bruno Schütz	1:27.20
1981	Tiroler	Peter Alafi	Sven von Mitzlaff	1:31.50
1982	Abary	Georg Bocskai	Heinz Jentzsch	1:29.30
1983	Lagunas	Georg Bocskai	Heinz Jentzsch	1:29.30
1984	Lirung	Georg Bocskai	Heinz Jentzsch	1:30.40
1985	Zentaurus	Georg Bocskai	Heinz Jentzsch	1:29.80
1986	Zampano	Georg Bocskai	Heinz Jentzsch	1:31.00
1987	Alkalde	Manfred Hofer	Peter Lautner	1:30.30
1988	Claridge	Olaf Schick	Uwe Ostmann	1:28.90
1989	Sound of Silence	Alan Freeman	Uwe Ostmann	1:24.50
1990	Belushi	Georg Bocskai	Uwe Ostmann	1:30.50
1991	Vincenzo	Mark Rimmer	Bruno Schütz	1:29.00
1992	Kornado	Mark Rimmer	Bruno Schütz	1:27.10
1993	Prince Firebird	Terence Hellier	Andreas Wöhler	1:29.60
1994	Macanal	Andrzej Tylicki	Heinz Jentzsch	1:28.75
1995	Barlovento	Georg Bocskai	Uwe Ostmann	1:28.50
1996	Abou Lahab	Neil Grant	Mario Hofer	1:25.36
1997	Angel Heart	Billy Newnes	Peter Lautner	1:24.93
1998	Bernardon	Andreas Suborics	Peter Schiergen	1:31.85
1999	Peppercorn	Pascal van de Keere	Uwe Ostmann	1:25.94
2000	Diamond Moon	Andreas Helfenbein	Christian von der Recke	1:27.30
2001	Orfisio	Filip Minarik	Andreas Löwe	1:29.30
2002	Minley	William Mongil	Ralf Suerland	1:24.51
2003	Traviano	Torsten Mundry	Peter Rau	1:26.59
2004	Kahn	William Mongil	Uwe Ostmann	1:23.40
2005	World's Mission	Andreas Helfenbein	Mario Hofer	1:28.21
2006	Lucky It Is	Andreas Helfenbein	Andreas Trybuhl	1:26.80
2007	Precious Boy	Andreas Helfenbein	Waldemar Hickst	1:25.52
2008	Peligroso	Jean-Pierre Carvalho	Mario Hofer	1:51.43
2009	Neatico	Andrasch Starke	Peter Schiergen	1:48.86
2010	Gereon	Pascal Werning	Christian Zschache	1:53.77
2011	Pastorius	Terence Hellier	Mario Hofer	1:50.95
2012	Flamingo Star	Alexander Pietsch	Roland Dzubasz	1:49.68
2013	Nordico	Daniele Porcu	Peter Schiergen	1:52.89
2014	Los Cerritos	Martin Seidl	Karl Demme	1:55.08
2015	Parthenius	Rafael Schistl	Mario Hofer	1:52,73
2016	Colomano	Martin Seidl	Markus Klug	1:44.42
2017	Poldi's Liebling	Bauyrzhan Murzabayev	Andreas Wohler	1:56.72
2018	Donjah	Lukas Delozier	Henk Grewe	1:46.42
2019	Wonderful Moon	Andrasch Starke	Henk Grewe	1:49.84
2020	Mythico	Lukas Delozier	Jean-Pierre Carvalho	1:50.53
2021	Tunnes	Bauyrzhan Murzabayev	Peter Schiergen	1:50.55
2022	Alpenjager	Bauyrzhan Murzabayev	Peter Schiergen	1:47.37
2023	Wonderful Boy	Andrasch Starke	Markus Klug	1:53.99
2024	Pompeo Dream	Thore Hammer Hansen	Bohumil Nedorostek	1:53.33
2025	Lommi	Thore Hammer Hansen	Hank Grewe	1:52.99

== Earlier winners ==
- 1876: Berggeist
- 1877: Lateran
- 1878: Tristan
- 1879: F. F.
- 1880: Walpurgis
- 1881: Trachenberg
- 1882: Architekt
- 1883: Weltmann
- 1884: Peregrin
- 1885: Potrimpos
- 1886: Pumpernickel
- 1887: Hortari
- 1888: Rochsburg
- 1889: Dalberg
- 1890: Walvater
- 1891: Correcticus
- 1892: Birkhahn
- 1893: Naklo
- 1894: Nixnutz
- 1895: Erzlump
- 1896: Wolkenschieber
- 1897: Habenichts
- 1898: Namouna
- 1899: Don Jose
- 1900: Daedalus / Nicus *
- 1901: Hamilkar
- 1902: Fama
- 1903: Gika
- 1904: Slaby
- 1905: Fels
- 1906: Desir
- 1907: Galopade / Horizont *
- 1908: Meister
- 1909: Hort
- 1910: Schill
- 1911: Kreuzer
- 1912: Csardas
- 1913: Mischief
- 1914: no race
- 1915: Chaputchin
- 1916: Frohsinn / Landstreicher *
- 1917: Skarabae
- 1918: Schnellfeuer
- 1919: Wallenstein
- 1920: König Midas
- 1921: Abschied
- 1922: Augias
- 1923: Patrizier
- 1924: Sisyphus
- 1925: Aurelius
- 1926: Mah Jong
- 1927: Contessa Maddalena
- 1928: Walzertraum
- 1929: Ladro
- 1930: Fathia
- 1931: Mio d'Arezzo
- 1932: Janitor
- 1933: Athanasius
- 1934: Valparaiso
- 1935: Nereide
- 1936: Iniga Isolani
- 1937: Adlerfee
- 1938: Wehr Dich
- 1939: Finitor
- 1940: Magnat
- 1941: Ortwin
- 1942: Balios
- 1943: Träumerei
- 1944: Kampfdegen
- 1945–46: no race
- 1947: Ostermorgen
- 1948: Aubergine
- 1949: Liebesorkan
- 1950: Wacholdis
- 1951: Leidenschaft
- 1952: Liebesmahl
- 1953: Usurpator
- 1954: König Ottokar
- 1955: Liebeslied
- 1956: Orsini
- 1957: Granit
- 1958: Matterhorn
- 1959: Santa Cruz
- 1960: Orlog
- 1961: Amboss
- 1962: Parabola
- 1963: Marinus
- 1964: Granado
- 1965: Bandit
- 1966: Chevalier
- 1967: Novara
- 1968: Hitchcock
- 1969: Lombard

* The 1900, 1907 and 1916 races were dead-heats and have joint winners.

== See also ==
- List of German flat horse races
- Recurring sporting events established in 1876 – this race is included under its original title, Deutscher Gestüt-Preis.
