= Herbst Stutenpreis =

Herbst Stutenpreis Grosser Preis Jungheinrich-Gabelstapler
- Class: Group 3
- Location: Hanover Racecourse; Hanover, Germany
- Inaugurated: 1999
- Race type: Flat / Thoroughbred
- Sponsor: Jungheinrich AG
- Website: Hanover

Race information
- Distance: 2,200 metres (1m 3f)
- Surface: Turf
- Track: Left-handed
- Qualification: Three-years-old and up fillies and mares
- Weight: 57 kg (3yo); 59 kg (4yo+)
- Purse: €50,000 (2021); 1st: €30,000

The Herbst Stutenpreis is a Group 3 flat horse race in Germany open to thoroughbred fillies and mares aged three years or older. It is run at Hanover over a distance of 2,200 metres (about 1 mile and 3 furlongs), and it is scheduled to take place each year in September or October.

== History ==
The event was originally held at Frankfurt, and it used to be called the Frankfurter Stutenpreis. It was established in 1999, and was initially contested over 2,150 metres. It was given Listed status in 2000, and promoted to Group 3 level in 2004.

The race was switched to Düsseldorf and extended to 2,200 metres in 2008. It returned to Frankfurt with its previous length in 2009.

The distance of the race was restored to 2,200 metres in 2010. That year's edition was staged at Düsseldorf, and subsequent runnings were held at Cologne (2011) and Hanover (2012).

The Herbst Stutenpreis has been run under various titles since leaving Frankfurt. It was known as the Grosser Preis Jungheinrich-Gabelstapler in 2012.

== Records ==
Most successful horse (2 wins):

- La Dancia – 2006, 2007

Leading jockey (3 wins):

- Andrasch Starke – Goathemala (2008), Norderney (2009), Walkaway (2021)

Leading trainer (4 wins):

- Peter Rau – Nouvelle Fortune (2001), Wurfscheibe (2005), La Dancia (2006, 2007)
- Peter Schiergen - Catella (1999), Goathemala (2008), Norderney (2009), Santagada (2025)

== Winners ==
Year	Winner	Age	Jockey	Trainer	Time
1999	Catella	3	Terence Hellier	Peter Schiergen	2:23.99
2000	Kapitol	3	Norman Richter	Andreas Schütz	2:25.09
2001	Nouvelle Fortune	3	Andre Best	Peter Rau	2:23.01
2002	Uriah	3	Waldemar Hickst	Harro Remmert	2:33.10
2003	Russian Samba	4	David Smith	Lord John FitzGerald	2:21.95
2004	Give Me Five	3	Jean-Pierre Carvalho	Erika Mäder	2:17.99
2005	Wurfscheibe	3	Torsten Mundry	Peter Rau	2:16.71
2006	La Dancia	3	Torsten Mundry	Peter Rau	2:24.95
2007	La Dancia	4	Norman Richter	Peter Rau	2:17.39
2008	Goathemala	3	Andrasch Starke	Peter Schiergen	2:21.71
2009	Norderney	3	Andrasch Starke	Peter Schiergen	2:24.37
2010	Pearl Banks	4	François-Xavier Bertras	François Rohaut	2:20.54
2011	Kapitale	3	Mirco Demuro	Andreas Wöhler	2:16.22
2012	Calipatria	5	Gérald Mossé	Henri-Alex Pantall	2:22.31
2013	Fitful Skies	4	Fabrice Veron	Henri-Alex Pantall	2:23.46
2014	Good Donna	3	Jack Mitchell	Jens Hirschberger	2:27.14
2015	Early Morning	6	Filip Minarik	Dr. Andreas Bolte	2:31.96
2016	Son Macia	3	Ian Ferguson	Andreas Lowe	2:28.86
2017	Ostana	4	Wladimir Panov	Daniel Paulick	2:33.79
2018	Sand Zabeel	3	Bauyrzhan Murzabayev	Andreas Wohler	2:23.34
2019	Lips Queen	3	Jozef Bojko	Eva Fabianova	2:28.22
2020	Lucky Lycra	4	Thomas Trullier	Francois Rohaut	2:25.13
2021	Walkaway	3	Andrasch Starke	Markus Klug	2:24.36
2022	India	4	Rene Piechulek	Waldemar Hickst	2:21.02
2023	North Reliance	3	Thore Hammer Hansen	Marcel Weiss	2:28.89
2024	Ultima	4	Carlos Lopez	Veronika Jandova	2:29.84
2025	Santagada	3	Leon Wolff	Peter Schiergen	2:28.13

== See also ==
- List of German flat horse races
- Recurring sporting events established in 1999 – this race is included under its original title, Frankfurter Stutenpreis.
