= Kölner Herbst-Stuten-Meile =

- Class: Group 3
- Location: Köln-Weidenpesch; Cologne, Germany
- Inaugurated: 2000
- Final run: 4 November 2007
- Race type: Flat / Thoroughbred
- Website: Köln-Weidenpesch

Race information
- Distance: 1,600 metres (1 mile)
- Surface: Turf
- Track: Right-handed
- Qualification: Three-years-old and up fillies and mares
- Weight: 56½ kg (3yo); 58 kg (4yo+)
- Purse: €50,000 (2007); 1st: €32,000

The Kölner Herbst-Stuten-Meile was a Group 3 flat horse race in Germany open to thoroughbred fillies and mares aged three years or older. It was run at Cologne over a distance of 1,600 metres (about 1 mile), and it was scheduled to take place each year in November.

The event was established in 2000, and it was initially classed at Listed level. It was promoted to Group 3 status in 2005.

The Kölner Herbst-Stuten-Meile was last run in 2007. It was replaced by the Schwarzgold-Rennen, a spring trial for three-year-old fillies, in 2008.

== Records ==
Most successful horse:

- no horse won this race more than once

Leading jockey (2 wins):

- Terence Hellier – Mosquera (2000), Nobilissima (2002)

Leading trainer:

- no trainer won this race more than once

== Winners ==
Year	Winner	Age	Jockey	Trainer	Time
2000	Mosquera	3	Terence Hellier	Peter Schiergen	1:44.41
2001	Lots of Love	4	Marco Monteriso	Andreas Löwe	1:41.79
2002	Nobilissima	3	Terence Hellier	Heinz Hesse
2003	Chato's Girl	4	Marc Timpelan	Horst Steinmetz	1:39.59
2004	Ianina	4	Ian Ferguson	Ralf Rohne	1:43.33
2005	Marine Bleue	3	Thierry Thulliez	Nicolas Clément	1:44.04
2006	Turning Light	3	Adrie de Vries	Mario Hofer	1:40.09
2007	Vincennes	3	Johan Victoire	Henri-Alex Pantall	1:43.13

== See also ==
- List of German flat horse races
