= Hansa-Preis =

Flat horse race in Germany

- Class: Group 2
- Location: Horner Rennbahn; Hamburg, Germany
- Inaugurated: 1892
- Race type: Flat / Thoroughbred
- Sponsor: IDEE
- Website: Hamburg

Race information
- Distance: 2,400 metres (1½ miles)
- Surface: Turf
- Track: Right-handed
- Qualification: Three-years-old and up
- Weight: 54 kg (3yo); 60 kg (4yo+); Allowances; 1½ kg for fillies and mares
- Purse: €70,000 (2012); 1st: €42,000

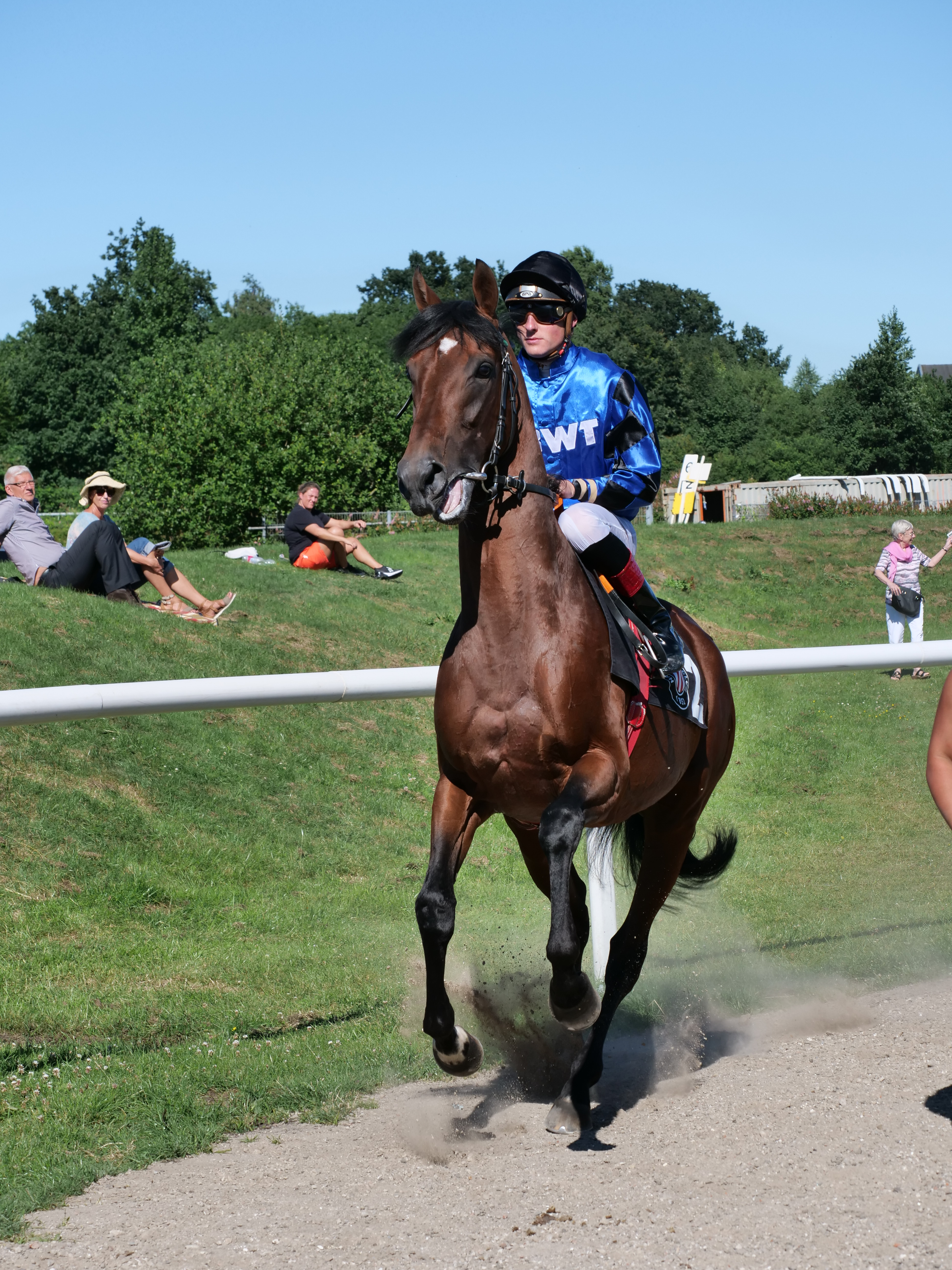
Hansa Preis 2018

The Hansa-Preis is a Group 2 flat horse race in Germany open to thoroughbreds aged three years or older. It is run at Hamburg-Horn over a distance of 2,400 metres (about 1½ miles), and takes place each year in June or July.

== History ==
The event was established in 1892, and was originally called the Grosser Hansa-Preis. It was known as the Jubiläums-Preis in 1902 and 1927.

The race was held at Dresden in 1944, but all of its other runnings have taken place at Hamburg. It was titled the Grosser Preis von Berlin in 1962.

The present system of race grading was introduced in Germany in 1972, and the Hansa-Preis was classed at Group 2 level.

The event used to be contested over 2,200 metres. It was extended by 200 metres in 2008.

== Records ==
Most successful horse (2 wins):

- Slusohr – 1898, 1899
- Graf Isolani – 1929, 1930
- Sturmvogel – 1936, 1937
- Opponent – 1963, 1966
- Orofino – 1982, 1983
- Egerton – 2006, 2008
- Protectionist – 2014, 2016
- Dschingis Secret – 2017, 2018
- Torquator Tasso – 2021, 2022

Leading jockey (6 wins):

- Gerhard Streit – Janus (1933), Walzerkönig (1939), Octavianus (1940), Fabier (1955), Masetto (1956), Traumgeist (1957, dead-heat)
- Peter Alafi – Opponent (1963, 1966), Königsstuhl (1981), Orofino (1982, 1983), Ordos (1984)

Leading trainer (9 wins):

- Heinz Jentzsch – Lombard (1972), Arratos (1973), Stuyvesant (1977), Acatenango (1987), Astylos (1988, dead-heat), El Salto (1988, dead-heat), Carlton (1993), Lando (1994), Monsun (1995)

== Winners since 1969 ==
Year	Winner	Age	Jockey	Trainer	Time
1969	Tajo	4	Johannes Starosta	Johannes Kuhr	2:20.80
1970	Goldbube	8	Kurt Lepa	Josef Hochstein	2:19.00
1971	Golfstrom	4	Peter Remmert	Hein Bollow	2:21.60
1972	Lombard	5	Fritz Drechsler	Heinz Jentzsch	2:37.70
1973	Arratos	4	Joan Pall	Heinz Jentzsch	2:18.30
1974	Caracol	5	Fritz Drechsler	Sven von Mitzlaff	2:21.00
1975	My Brief	6	Fritz Drechsler	Theo Grieper	2:17.10
1976	Record Run	5	Eric Eldin	Gavin Pritchard-Gordon	2:14.10
1977	Stuyvesant	4	Joan Pall	Heinz Jentzsch	2:17.00
1978	Roscoe Blake	3	Kipper Lynch	Bruce Hobbs	2:21.20
1979	San Vicente	5	José Orihuel	Adolf Wöhler	2:21.00
1980	Toscarimus	3	Lutz Mäder	Bruno Schütz	2:40.20
1981	Königsstuhl	5	Peter Alafi	Sven von Mitzlaff	2:28.40
1982	Orofino	4	Peter Alafi	Sven von Mitzlaff	2:19.90
1983	Orofino	5	Peter Alafi	Sven von Mitzlaff	2:20.60
1984	Ordos	4	Peter Alafi	Sven von Mitzlaff	2:29.80
1985	Daun	4	Pat Gilson	Theo Grieper	2:30.70
1986	Tommy Way	3	Brent Thomson	John Dunlop	2:16.50
1987	Acatenango	5	Georg Bocskai	Heinz Jentzsch	2:27.90
1988 (dh)	Astylos; El Salto	4; 5	Georg Bocskai; Andrzej Tylicki	Heinz Jentzsch; Heinz Jentzsch	2:16.65
1989	Filia Ardross	3	Lutz Mäder	Bruno Schütz	2:18.70
1990	Turfkönig	4	Georg Bocskai	Uwe Ostmann	2:21.50
1991	Indica	4	Manfred Hofer	Raimund Prinzinger	2:27.30
1992	Lomitas	4	Andreas Boschert	Andreas Wöhler	2:18.80
1993	Carlton	4	Andrzej Tylicki	Heinz Jentzsch	2:23.30
1994	Lando	4	Peter Schiergen	Heinz Jentzsch	2:14.40
1995	Monsun (Note: Germany finished first in 1995, but he was relegated to second place following a stewards' inquiry)	5	Peter Schiergen	Heinz Jentzsch	2:16.20
1996	Protektor	7	Neil Grant	Andreas Löwe	2:20.84
1997	Oxalagu	5	Andrasch Starke	Bruno Schütz	2:27.72
1998	Elle Danzig	3	Stanley Chin	Andreas Schütz	2:26.80
1999	Caitano	5	Andrasch Starke	Andreas Schütz	2:14.02
2000	Flamingo Road	4	Andrasch Starke	Andreas Schütz	2:31.34
2001	Aeskulap	4	Andreas Helfenbein	Hans Blume	2:18.60
2002	Simoun	4	Andreas Suborics	Peter Schiergen	2:32.80
2003	Aolus	4	Andrasch Starke	Andreas Schütz	2:17.80
2004	Rotteck	4	Jean-Pierre Carvalho	Hartmut Steguweit	2:24.63
2005	Simonas (Note: Soldier Hollow was first in 2005, but he was placed second after a stewards' inquiry)	6	Eduardo Pedroza	Andreas Wöhler	2:20.37
2006	Egerton	5	Terence Hellier	Peter Rau	2:16.82
2007	Schiaparelli	4	Andrasch Starke	Peter Schiergen	2:31.75
2008	Egerton	7	Torsten Mundry	Peter Rau	2:34.53
2009	Flamingo Fantasy	4	Andreas Suborics	Waldemar Hickst	2:28.17
2010	see note (Note: The 2010 edition was merged with the Deutschland-Preis)
2011	Lucas Cranach	4	Eugen Frank	Sascha Smrczek	2:29.22
2012	Ovambo Queen	5	Filip Minarik	Dr Andreas Bolte	2:35.96
2013	Runaway (Note: Berlin Berlin was first in 2013, but he was disqualified after failing a dope test)	5	Steve Drowne	Andreas Tybuhl	2:33.62
2014	Protectionist	4	Eduardo Pedroza	Andreas Wöhler	2:31.80
2015	Lovelyn	3	Andrasch Starke	Peter Schiergen	2:27.65
2016	Protectionist	6	Eduardo Pedroza	Andreas Wöhler	2:47.29
2017	Dschingis Secret	4	Martin Seidl	Markus Klug	2:38.38
2018	Dschingis Secret	5	Martin Seidl	Markus Klug	2:33.92
2019	French King	4	Olivier Peslier	Henri-Alex Pantall	2:29.61
2020	Satomi	4	Michael Cadeddu	Markus Klug	2:41.30
2021	Torquator Tasso	4	Rene Piechulek	Marcel Weiss	2:36.70
2022	Torquator Tasso	5	Rene Piechulek	Marcel Weiss	2:40.43
2023	Assistent	4	Thore Hammer Hansen	Henk Grew	2:40.35
2024	Lordano	5	Rene Piechulek	Marcel Weiss	2:44.38
2025	Augustus	4	Adrie de Vries	Waldemar Hickst	2:38.05
2026	Global Health	5	Benjamin Marie	Fabian Xaver Weißmeier	2:38.94

== Earlier winners ==
- 1892: Nickel
- 1893: Dorn
- 1894: Alconbury
- 1895: Hannibal
- 1896: Trollhetta
- 1897: Flunkermichel
- 1898: Slusohr
- 1899: Slusohr
- 1900: Over Norton
- 1901: Regenwolke / Tuki *
- 1902: Nunquamdormio
- 1903: Macdonald
- 1904: Sorrento
- 1905: Inverno
- 1906: Festino
- 1907: Fels
- 1908: Horizont
- 1909: For Ever
- 1910: Orient
- 1911: Star
- 1912: Gulliver II
- 1913: Cairo / Laudanum *
- 1914: Ariel
- 1915: no race
- 1916: Ritter
- 1917: Pergolese
- 1918: Wirbel
- 1919: Marmor
- 1920: Alamund
- 1921: Der Mohr
- 1922: Wallenstein
- 1923: Abgott
- 1924: Barde
- 1925: Weissdorn
- 1926: Aditi
- 1927: Torero
- 1928: Impressionist / Löwenherz *
- 1929: Graf Isolani
- 1930: Graf Isolani
- 1931: Sichel
- 1932: Palastpage
- 1933: Janus
- 1934: Blinzen
- 1935: Athanasius
- 1936: Sturmvogel
- 1937: Sturmvogel
- 1938: Trollius
- 1939: Walzerkönig
- 1940: Octavianus
- 1941: Nuvolari
- 1942: Berber
- 1943: no race
- 1944: Ferolius
- 1945–47: no race
- 1948: Pfälzerin
- 1949: Ataman
- 1950: Geweihter
- 1951: Mandarin
- 1952: Asterios
- 1953: Prodomo
- 1954: Grenzbock
- 1955: Fabier
- 1956: Masetto
- 1957: Magus / Traumgeist *
- 1958: Liperion
- 1959: Obermaat
- 1960: Waidmann
- 1961: Windbruch
- 1962: Wicht
- 1963: Opponent
- 1964: Imperial
- 1965: Fanfar
- 1966: Opponent
- 1967: Agami
- 1968: Luciano

* The 1901, 1913, 1928 and 1957 races were dead-heats and have joint winners.

== See also ==
- List of German flat horse races
- Recurring sporting events established in 1892 – this race is included under its original title, Grosser Hansa-Preis.
