= Flieger Trophy =

Flieger Trophy Grosser Preis der Jungheinrich Gabelstapler
- Class: Group 3
- Location: Horner Rennbahn; Hamburg, Germany
- Inaugurated: 1966
- Race type: Flat / Thoroughbred
- Website: Hamburg

Race information
- Distance: 1,200 metres (6f)
- Surface: Turf
- Track: Right-handed
- Qualification: Three-years-old and up
- Weight: 55 kg (3yo); 58 kg (4yo+); Allowances; 1½ kg for fillies and mares 1 kg if not won €12,000 * Penalties; 3 kg for Group 1 winners * 2 kg for Group 2 winners * 1 kg for Group 3 winners * * since July 1 last year
- Purse: €55,000 (2012); 1st: €32,000

The Flieger Trophy is a Group 3 flat horse race in Germany open to thoroughbreds aged three years or older. It is run at Hamburg-Horn over a distance of 1,200 metres (about 6 furlongs), and it is scheduled to take place each year in June or July.

== History ==
The event was established in 1966, and the inaugural running was titled the Campari-Preis. It was initially contested over 1,200 metres, and was extended to 1,400 metres in 1974. For a period it was known as the Preis der Dresdner Bank.

The race was given Group 3 status in 1985, and it reverted to 1,200 metres in 1989. Its title has often changed, and for several years it was called the Holsten-Trophy. It became known as the Flieger Trophy in 2010.

== Records ==
Most successful horse (2 wins):

- Dream Talk – 1991, 1992
- Areion – 1998, 2000
- Gorse – 1999, 2001
- Lucky Strike – 2004, 2005
- Govinda – 2010, 2012

Leading jockey (4 wins):

- Peter Remmert – Gegenwind (1968), Tamburlaine (1972), Weltstar (1979), Zünftiger (1984)

Leading trainer (4 wins):

- Andreas Wöhler – Areion (1998, 2000), Govinda (2010, 2012)

== Winners ==
| Year | Winner | Age | Jockey | Trainer | Time |
|---|---|---|---|---|---|
| 1966 | Wirbel | 5 | Johannes Starosta | Hans Blume, Sr. | 1:12.60 |
| 1967 | Pentathlon | 3 | Oskar Langner | H. Danner | 1:12.00 |
| 1968 | Gegenwind | 4 | Peter Remmert | Hein Bollow | 1:11.40 |
| 1969 | Burglar | 3 | Ron Hutchinson | John Dunlop | 1:11.50 |
| 1970 | Gallic | 7 | Paul Cook | B. Andersen | 1:10.40 |
| 1971 | Rocket | 3 | E. M. R. Smith | Anton Pohlkötter | 1:11.30 |
| 1972 | Tamburlaine | 6 | Peter Remmert | A. Deschner | 1:16.60 |
| 1973 | Akbar | 4 | Fritz Drechsler | Heinz Jentzsch | 1:10.80 |
| 1974 | Tarik | 4 | Raimund Prinzinger | Oskar Langner | 1:22.00 |
| 1975 | Garzer | 6 | Peter Alafi | Anton Pohlkötter | 1:19.20 |
| 1976 | Kronenkranich | 4 | Jerzy Jednaszewski | Theo Grieper | 1:20.80 |
| 1977 | Andrang | 4 | Udo Balzer | Adolf Wöhler | 1:19.70 |
| 1978 | Ambizioso | 4 | Willie Carson | Georg Zuber | 1:26.50 |
| 1979 | Weltstar | 4 | Peter Remmert | Theo Grieper | 1:25.00 |
| 1980 | Slenderhagen | 4 | Ralf Suerland | Heinz Jentzsch | 1:27.80 |
| 1981 | Park Romeo | 5 | Lutz Mäder | Herbert Cohn | 1:26.00 |
| 1982 | Thai King | 4 | Brian Wilson | Bengt Bengtsson | 1:27.10 |
| 1983 | Buster Brown | 8 | Walter Buick | L. Quvang | 1:22.60 |
| 1984 | Zünftiger | 6 | Peter Remmert | Hein Bollow | 1:25.00 |
| 1985 | Diu Star | 5 | Pat Gilson | Theo Grieper | 1:20.30 |
| 1986 | Sylvan Express | 3 | Gary Carter | Philip Mitchell | 1:20.30 |
| 1987 | Home Please | 5 | Andrzej Tylicki | Lennart Jarven | 1:22.50 |
| 1988 | Luzum | 4 | Trevor Rogers | Harry Thomson Jones | 1:22.90 |
| 1989 | Savahra Sound | 4 | Brian Rouse | Richard Hannon, Sr. | 1:12.60 |
| 1990 | Dictator's Song | 3 | Alain Lequeux | Robert Collet | 1:12.50 |
| 1991 | Dream Talk | 4 | Gérald Mossé | Nicolas Clément | 1:10.10 |
| 1992 | Dream Talk | 5 | Gérald Mossé | Nicolas Clément | 1:07.90 |
| 1993 | Robin des Pins | 5 | Cash Asmussen | François Boutin | 1:09.70 |
| 1994 | Sharp Prod | 4 | Alan Munro | Lord Huntingdon | 1:11.00 |
| 1995 | Hever Golf Rose | 4 | Paul Eddery | Joe Naughton | 1:11.90 |
| 1996 | Waky Nao | 3 | Andreas Suborics | Bruno Schütz | 1:15.74 |
| 1997 | Global Player | 4 | Andrasch Starke | Hans Blume | 1:10.95 |
| 1998 | Areion | 3 | Andreas Boschert | Andreas Wöhler | 1:14.50 |
| 1999 | Gorse | 4 | Torsten Mundry | Henry Candy | 1:08.81 |
| 2000 | Areion | 5 | Andrasch Starke | Andreas Wöhler | 1:12.69 |
| 2001 | Gorse | 6 | John Reid | Henry Candy | 1:12.68 |
| 2002 | El Gran Lode | 7 | Rodrigo Blanco | Diego Lowther | 1:12.72 |
| 2003 | Capricho | 6 | Jimmy Quinn | Jon Akehurst | 1:11.63 |
| 2004 | Lucky Strike | 6 | Adrie de Vries | Andreas Trybuhl | 1:15.07 |
| 2005 | Lucky Strike | 7 | Adrie de Vries | Andreas Trybuhl | 1:11.00 |
| 2006 | Electric Beat | 3 | Andreas Helfenbein | Andreas Löwe | 1:10.54 |
| 2007 | Key to Pleasure | 7 | Andreas Suborics | Mario Hofer | 1:18.47 |
| 2008 | Overdose | 3 | Andreas Suborics | Sandor Ribarszki | 1:12.19 |
| 2009 | Etoile Nocturne | 5 | William Mongil | Werner Baltromei | 1:10.25 |
| 2010 | Govinda | 3 | Eduardo Pedroza | Andreas Wöhler | 1:10.24 |
| 2011 | Walero | 5 | Koen Clijmans | Uwe Ostmann | 1:11.38 |
| 2012 | Govinda | 5 | Eduardo Pedroza | Andreas Wöhler | 1:10.82 |
| 2013 | Dabbitse | 4 | Andreas Helfenbein | C. Zschache | 1:09.96 |
| 2014 | Amarillo | 5 | Adrie de Vries | Peter Schiergen | 1:11.19 |
| 2015 | Donnerschlag | 5 | Filip Minarik | Jean-Pierre Carvalho | 1:10.17 |
| 2016 | Schang | 3 | Federico Bossa | Pavel Vovcenko | 1:17.42 |
| 2017 | Millowitsch | 4 | Andreas Helfenbein | Markus Klug | 1:13.38 |
| 2018 | Julio | 3 | Alexander Pietsch | Mario Hofer | 1:11.18 |
| 2019 | Waldpfad | 5 | Wladimir Panov | Dominik Moser | 1:11.42 |

== See also ==
- List of German flat horse races
