= Bénazet-Rennen =

Listed flat horse race in Germany

Bénazet-Rennen Mercedes-Benz-Sprintpreis
- Class: Listed
- Location: Iffezheim Racecourse; Baden-Baden, Germany
- Inaugurated: 1972
- Race type: Flat / Thoroughbred
- Sponsor: Mercedes-Benz
- Website: Baden-Baden

Race information
- Distance: 1,200 metres (6f)
- Surface: Turf
- Track: Left-handed
- Qualification: Three-years-old and up
- Weight: 55 kg (3yo); 59 kg (4yo+); Allowances; 1½ kg for fillies and mares 2 kg if not won €7,000 * 1 kg if not won €10,000 * * since June 1 last year Penalties; 2 kg for Group winners ** 1 kg for Listed winners ** ** since January 1 last year
- Purse: €20,000 (2012); 1st: €12,000

The Bénazet-Rennen is a Listed flat horse race in Germany open to thoroughbreds aged three years or older. It is run at Baden-Baden over a distance of 1,200 metres (about 6 furlongs), and it is scheduled to take place each year in May or June.

== History ==
The event is named after Edouard Bénazet (1801–1867), the founder of Baden-Baden's Iffezheim Racecourse. It was established in 1972, and was originally contested over 1,400 metres. It was cut to 1,200 metres in 1983.

During the early 1990s, the Bénazet-Rennen was classed at Listed level. It was promoted to Group 3 status in 1995.

The race was titled the Belmondo-Pokal in 2011. It returned to Listed level and became known as the Mercedes-Benz-Sprintpreis in 2012.

== Records ==
Most successful horse (3 wins):

- Lucky Strike – 2004, 2005, 2007

Leading jockey (3 wins):

- Andrzej Tylicki – Park Romeo (1981), Bismarck (1985), Home Please (1987)
- Terence Hellier – Auenadler (1999), Call Me Big (2002), Smooth Operator (2011)
- Adrie de Vries – Lucky Strike (2004, 2005, 2007)

Leading trainer (4 wins):

- Andreas Trybuhl – Lucky Strike (2004, 2005, 2007), Soave (2006)

== Winners since 1990 ==
Year	Winner	Age	Jockey	Trainer	Time
1990	Roman Prose	5	Marc de Smyter	Jonathan Pease	1:09.30
1991	Irish Shoal	3	Pierre Bouhey	John Hammond	1:08.00
1992	Mister Slippers	3	Corey Black	Robert Collet	1:12.20
1993	Dolphin Street	3	Cash Asmussen	John Hammond	1:12.38
1994	Nasr Allah	4	Dragan Ilic	Fredy Scheffer	1:11.94
1995	Wessam Prince	4	Walter Swinburn	Carlos Laffon-Parias	1:12.07
1996	Passion for Life	3	Paul Eddery	Geoff Lewis	1:09.02
1997	Monaassib	6	Daragh O'Donohoe	Ed Dunlop	1:07.91
1998	Dyhim Diamond	4	Dominique Boeuf	Carlos Laffon-Parias	1:09.01
1999	Auenadler	7	Terence Hellier	Uwe Ostmann	1:10.43
2000	Skip	6	Torsten Mundry	Urs Suter	1:12.19
2001	Gorse	6	John Reid	Henry Candy	1:08.09
2002	Call Me Big	4	Terence Hellier	Eckhart Gröschel	1:08.68
2003	Ingolf	5	Eduardo Pedroza	Andreas Wöhler	1:09.99
2004	Lucky Strike	6	Adrie de Vries	Andreas Trybuhl	1:07.94
2005	Lucky Strike	7	Adrie de Vries	Andreas Trybuhl	1:07.56
2006	Soave	7	Olivier Peslier	Andreas Trybuhl	1:09.26
2007	Lucky Strike	9	Adrie de Vries	Andreas Trybuhl	1:11.35
2008	Abbadjinn	4	Torsten Mundry	Peter Rau	1:10.03
2009	Contat	6	Rastislav Juracek	Pavel Vovcenko	1:09.97
2010	Amico Fritz ^{[a]}	4	Fabrice Veron	Henri-Alex Pantall	1:09.50
2011	Smooth Operator	5	Terence Hellier	Mario Hofer	1:07.72
2012	Smooth Operator	6	Stefanie Hofer	Mario Hofer	1:07.95

^{a} The 2010 running took place at Hoppegarten.

== Earlier winners ==
- 1972: Aga
- 1973: Garzer
- 1974: Garzer
- 1975: Widerhall
- 1976: Tarik
- 1977: Gourmet
- 1978: Noilly Prat
- 1979: Iron Ruler
- 1980: Nephrit
- 1981: Park Romeo
- 1982: Ratsherr
- 1983: Another Risk
- 1984: Mark
- 1985: Bismarck
- 1986: Elnawaagi
- 1987: Home Please
- 1988: Green's Picture
- 1989: Savahra Sound

== See also ==
- List of German flat horse races
