= Baden-Württemberg-Trophy =

Group 3 flat horse race in Germany

Baden-Württemberg-Trophy Hubertus-Liebrecht-Gedächtnispreis
- Class: Group 3
- Location: Iffezheim Racecourse; Baden-Baden, Germany
- Inaugurated: 2004
- Race type: Flat / Thoroughbred
- Website: Baden-Baden

Race information
- Distance: 2,400 metres (1½ miles)
- Surface: Turf
- Track: Left-handed
- Qualification: Three-years-old and up
- Weight: 55 kg (3yo); 58 kg (4yo+); Allowances; 1½ kg for fillies and mares 1 kg if not won €12,000 * Penalties; 3 kg for Group 1 winners * 2 kg for Group 2 winners * 1 kg for Group 3 winners * * since January 1
- Purse: €55,000 (2012); 1st: €32,000

The Baden-Württemberg-Trophy is a Group 3 flat horse race in Germany open to thoroughbreds aged three years or older. It is run at Baden-Baden over a distance of 2,400 metres (about 1½ miles), and it is scheduled to take place each year in October.

The event is named after Baden-Württemberg, the state in which the racecourse is located. It was established in 2004, and was originally contested over 2,200 metres. It was extended to 2,400 metres in 2011.

The race was titled the Hubertus-Liebrecht-Gedächtnispreis in 2012.

== Records ==
Most successful horse:

- no horse has won this race more than once

Leading jockey (2 wins):

- Adrie de Vries - Ever Strong (2014), Only The Brave (2021)

Leading trainer (3 wins):

- Peter Schiergen – Saldentigerin (2005), Silvaner (2011), Navaro Girl (2017)
- Andreas Wöhler – Simonas (2006), Seismos (2012), Potemkin (2018)

== Winners ==
Year	Winner	Age	Jockey	Trainer	Time
2004	Deva	5	Andreas Suborics	Dieter Ronge	2:28.13
2005	Saldentigerin	4	William Mongil	Peter Schiergen	2:25.20
2006	Simonas	7	Eduardo Pedroza	Andreas Wöhler	2:22.10
2007	Egerton	6	Torsten Mundry	Peter Rau	2:17.89
2008	Sommertag	5	Terence Hellier	Jens Hirschberger	2:23.25
2009	Liang Kay	4	Yann Lerner	Uwe Ostmann	2:24.65
2010	Durban Thunder	4	Norman Richter	Torsten Mundry	2:23.31
2011	Silvaner	3	Filip Minarik	Peter Schiergen	2:37.53
2012	Seismos	4	Andrea Atzeni	Andreas Wöhler	2:34.41
2013	Vif Monsieur	3	Koen Clijmans	Sascha Smrczek	2:46.15
2014	Ever Strong	6	Adrie de Vries	Dr. A. Bolte	2:13.24
2015	Incantator	3	Jozef Bojko	Andreas Wohler	2:07.23
2016	Palace Prince	4	Andreas Helfenbein	Andreas Lowe	2:12.04
2017	Navaro Girl	3	Daniele Porcu	Peter Schiergen	2:20.18
2018	Potemkin	7	Bauyrzhan Murzabayev	Andreas Wohler	2:03.60
2019	Nancho	4	Bayarsaikhan Ganbat	Gabor Maronka	2:14.21
2021	Only The Brave	4	Adrie de Vries	Henk Grewe	2:07.65

== See also ==
- List of German flat horse races
