= Hamburger Stutenmeile =

Hamburger Stutenmeile Franz-Günther von Gaertner Gedächtnisrennen
- Class: Group 3
- Location: Horner Rennbahn; Hamburg, Germany
- Race type: Flat / Thoroughbred
- Website: Hamburg

Race information
- Distance: 1,600 metres (1 mile)
- Surface: Turf
- Track: Right-handed
- Qualification: Three-years-old and up fillies and mares
- Weight: 53½ kg (3y); 58 kg (4y+); Allowances; 1 kg if no Listed win (4y+) * Penalties; 3 kg for Group 1 winners * 2 kg for Group 2 winners * 1 kg for Group 3 winners * * since July 1 last year
- Purse: €55,000 (2012); 1st: €32,000

Hamburger Stutenmeile
2020
Half Light	Song Of Life	Sanora

Previous years
2019
Axana	Shalona	Madita
2018
Indian Blessing	Binti Al Nar	Cabarita
2017
Shy Witch	Wild Approach	Absolute Blast
2016
Shy Witch	Nymeria	Schutzenpost
2015
Odeliz	Evita Peron	Schutzenpost
2014
Calyxa	Diamond Dove	Artwork Genie
2013
Lady Jacamira	Akua'da	Scoville
2012
Cherry Danon	Survey	Lady Jacamira
2011
Vanjura	Rockatella	Magic Eye
2010
Aslana	Vanjura	Fabiana
2009
Caro Jina	Whispered Dreams	Mambo Light
2008
Peace Royale	Flashing Colour	Nolas Lolly
2007
Touch My Soul	Waky Love	The Spring Flower
2006
Molly Art	Sexy Lady	Squaw Dance

The Hamburger Stutenmeile is a Group 3 flat horse race in Germany open to thoroughbred fillies and mares aged three years or older. It is run at Hamburg-Horn over a distance of 1,600 metres (about 1 mile), and it is scheduled to take place each year in June or July.

== History ==
The event has been known by several different titles, and some of these have been assigned to various other races. It was called the Schwarzgold-Rennen from 1995 to 1998, and during this period it was ungraded. It was renamed the Schlenderhaner Stutenpreis in 1999, and given Listed status in 2000.

The race was retitled the Fährhofer Stutenpreis in 2001, and promoted to Group 3 level in 2004. It was subsequently registered as the Hamburger Stutenpreis, and later the Hamburger Stutenmeile.

Alternative titles have included the Alice-Cup (2006), the Credit Suisse-Rennen (2007), the Preis der Spielbank Hamburg (2008–09) and the Wenatex Europa-Grupperennen (2010). It was run at Bremen as the Walther J. Jacobs-Stutenmeile in 2011.

The Hamburger Stutenmeile is currently run in memory of Franz-Günther von Gaertner, a former president of the Hamburger Renn-Club.

== Records ==
Most successful horse:

- no horse has won this race more than once since 1995

Leading jockey since 1995 (4 wins):

- Andrasch Starke – Distella (1997), Aslana (2010), Cherry Danon (2012), Santagada (2025)
- Andreas Suborics – Voodoo Lounge (1998), Kimbajar (2001), Molly Art (2006), Touch My Soul (2007)

Leading trainer since 1995 (5 wins):

- Andreas Wöhler – Socota (1995), Kimbajar (2001), Peaceful Love (2005), Peace Royale (2008), Axana (2019)

== Winners since 1995 ==
Year	Winner	Age	Jockey	Trainer	Time
1995	Socota	3	Torsten Mundry	Andreas Wöhler	1:39.60
1996	Baccara	3	Peter Schiergen	Heinz Jentzsch	1:41.80
1997	Distella	4	Andrasch Starke	Hans Blume	1:40.48
1998	Voodoo Lounge	3	Andreas Suborics	Ralf Suerland	1:45.98
1999	Breda	4	Terence Hellier	Uwe Ostmann	1:37.98
2000	Kirona	3	Torsten Mundry	Peter Rau	1:43.50
2001	Kimbajar	3	Andreas Suborics	Andreas Wöhler	1:43.10
2002	Bedford Set	4	Andreas Helfenbein	Horst Steinmetz	1:41.54
2003	Avenir Rubra	3	Jozef Bojko	Erika Mäder	1:39.07
2004	Eyeq	4	Nicholas Cordrey	Søren Jensen	1:39.93
2005	Peaceful Love	3	Eduardo Pedroza	Andreas Wöhler	1:38.45
2006	Molly Art	4	Andreas Suborics	Uwe Ostmann	1:36.17
2007	Touch My Soul	3	Andreas Suborics	Peter Schiergen	1:45.10
2008	Peace Royale	3	Eduardo Pedroza	Andreas Wöhler	1:36.81
2009	Caro Jina	3	Terence Hellier	Andreas Trybuhl	1:38.10
2010	Aslana	3	Andrasch Starke	Peter Schiergen	1:37.60
2011	Vanjura ^{[a]}	4	Alexander Pietsch	Roland Dzubasz	1:35.90
2012	Cherry Danon	3	Andrasch Starke	Peter Schiergen	1:39.38
2013	Lady Jacamira	4	Alexander Pietsch	Roland Dzubasz	1:36.98
2014	Calyxa	4	Adrie de Vries	Ferdinand Leve	1:38.45
2015	Odeliz	5	Adrie de Vries	Karl Burke	1:34.95
2016	Shy Witch	3	Ian Ferguson	H-J Gröschel	1:45.64
2017	Shy Witch	4	Eduardo Pedroza	H-J Gröschel	1:45.82
2018	Indian Blessing	4	Gerald Mosse	Ed Walker	1:37.60
2019	Axana	3	Eduardo Pedroza	Andreas Wohler	1:35.42
2020	Half Light	4	Soufiane Saadi	H-A Pantall	1:40.20
2021	Reine D'Amour	3	Rene Piechulek	Marcel Weiss	1:37.66
2022	Arina	3	Michal Abik	Roland Dzubasz	1:37.70
2023	Muskoka	3	Augustin Madamet	Henk Grewe	1:40.57
2024	Three Havanas	3	Thore Hammer Hansen	Henk Grewe	1:42.13
2025	Santagada	3	Andrasch Starke	Peter Schiergen	1:39.87
2026	Sunlit Uplands	4	Marco Ghiani	Stuart Williams	1:41.71

^{a} The 2011 running took place at Bremen.

== See also ==
- List of German flat horse races
