= List of German flat horse races =

A list of notable flat horse races which take place annually in Germany, including all conditions races which currently hold Group 1, 2 or 3 status in the European Pattern.

== Group 1 ==
Month	Race Name	Racecourse	Dist. (m)	Age/Sex	2026 winner (2025 winner in italics)
July	Deutsches Derby	Hamburg	2,400	3yo c&f	Dardanos
July	Bayerisches Zuchtrennen	Munich	2,000	3yo+	Hotazhell
August	Preis der Diana	Düsseldorf	2,200	3yo f	Soreanga
August	Grosser Preis von Berlin	Hoppegarten	2,400	3yo+	Tiffany
September	Grosser Preis von Baden	Baden-Baden	2,400	3yo+	Saddadd
September	Preis von Europa	Cologne	2,400	3yo+	Goliath
November	Grosser Preis von Bayern	Munich	2,400	3yo+	Santagada

== Group 2 ==
Month	Race Name	Racecourse	Dist. (m)	Age/Sex	2026 Winner (2025 winner in italics)
April / May	Gerling-Preis	Cologne	2,400	4yo+	Alleno
May	Bavarian Classic	Munich	2,000	3yo	Gostam
May	Oleander-Rennen	Hoppegarten	3,200	4yo+	Lordano
May	Mehl-Mülhens-Rennen	Cologne	1,600	3yo c&f	Title Role
May / June	Grosser Preis der Badischen Wirtschaft	Baden-Baden	2,200	4yo+	Alleno
June	German 1,000 Guineas	Düsseldorf	1,600	3yo f	Timeforshowcasing
June	Union-Rennen	Cologne	2,200	3yo	Englishman
June / July	Hansa-Preis	Hamburg	2,400	3yo+	Global Health
Aug / Sept	Oettingen-Rennen	Baden-Baden	1,600	3yo+	Loucas
Aug / Sept	Baden Racing Stuten-Preis	Baden-Baden	2,400	3yo+ f	Santagada

== Group 3 ==
Month	Race Name	Racecourse	Dist. (m)	Age/Sex	2026 Winner (2025 winner in italics)
April	Frühjahrs-Meile	Düsseldorf	1,600	4yo+	New Emerald
April	Dr. Busch-Memorial	Krefeld	1,700	3yo	Asker
April / May	Silberne Peitsche	Munich	1,300	3yo+	Kylian
May	Schwarzgold-Rennen	Cologne	1,600	3yo f	Santa Catarina
May / June	Diana-Trial	Hoppegarten	2,000	3yo f	Gua Lipa
May / June	Badener Meile	Baden-Baden	1,600	3yo+	Sir Tommy Cen
May / June	Japan Racing Association Derby-Trial; Derby-Trial	Baden-Baden	2,000	3yo	Seguro
June	Dortmund Grand Prix	Dortmund	2,000	3yo+	Best Lightning
June / July	Grosser Preis von LOTTO Hamburg	Hamburg	2,000	3yo+	Seguro
June / July	Hamburger Stutenmeile	Hamburg	1,600	3yo+ f	Sunlit Uplands
June / July	Hamburger Stuten-Preis	Hamburg	2,200	3yo f	Soreanga
July	Fürstenberg-Rennen	(Rotates location)	2,000	3yo+	Nastaria
June / July	Flieger Trophy	Hamburg	1,200	3yo+
July	Meilen-Trophy	(Rotates location)	1,600	3yo+	Sommersby
August	Preis der Sparkassen-Finanzgruppe	Baden-Baden	2,000	4yo+	Stingray
Aug / Sept	Zukunfts-Rennen	Baden-Baden	1,400	2yo	Gymbaazy
Aug / Sept	Goldene Peitsche	Baden-Baden	1,200	3yo+	Holguin
September	Grosse Europa-Meile	Munich	1,600	3yo+
Sept / Oct	Deutsches St. Leger	Dortmund	2,800	3yo+	Lordano
October	Preis der Deutschen Einheit	Hoppegarten	2,000	3yo+	Santagada
October	G. P. der Landeshauptstadt Düsseldorf	Düsseldorf	1,700	3yo+	Short Final
October	Preis des Winterfavoriten	Cologne	1,600	2yo	Gostam
October	Baden-Württemberg-Trophy	Baden-Baden	2,400	3yo+
October	Preis der Winterkönigin	Baden-Baden	1,600	2yo f	Alsterperle
October	Herbst Stutenpreis	Hanover	2,200	3yo+ f	Santagada
November	Herzog von Ratibor-Rennen	Krefeld	1,700	2yo	Lommi
November	Niederrhein-Pokal	Krefeld	2,000	3yo+	Lordano

== Former Group races ==
Month	Race Name	Racecourse	Dist. (m)	Age/Sex
April	Grand Prix-Aufgalopp	Cologne	2,100	4yo+
April	G. P. der Bremer Wirtschaft	Bremen	2,200	4yo+
April	G. P. der Gelsenkirchener Wirtschaft	Gelsenkirchen	2,000	4yo+
April	Grosser Preis von Dahlwitz	Hoppegarten	1,600	3yo
May / June	Bénazet-Rennen	Baden-Baden	1,200	3yo+
June	Walther J. Jacobs-Rennen	Bremen	2,100	3yo
July	Sommer Stuten-Preis	Krefeld	2,200	3yo+ f
August	EuropaChampionat	Hoppegarten	2,400	3yo
August	Grosser Preis von Berlin	Hoppegarten	1,300	3yo+
September	Euro-Cup	Frankfurt	2,000	3yo+
September	Oppenheim Stuten-Meile	Cologne	1,600	3yo+ f
September	Deutscher Stutenpreis	Hanover	2,400	3yo+ f
October	Badener Sprint-Cup	Baden-Baden	1,400	3yo+
October	Hitchcock-Memorial	Cologne	2,950	3yo+
Oct / Nov	G. P. der Freien Hansestadt Bremen	Bremen	1,600	3yo+
November	Kölner Herbst-Stuten-Meile	Cologne	1,600	3yo+ f

== Discontinued ==
Last Run	Race Name	Racecourse	Distance	Age/Sex
June 2011	Hamburger Meile	Hamburg	1,600	3yo+
