= Grosser Preis der Freien Hansestadt Bremen =

- Class: Group 3
- Location: Bremen Racecourse; Bremen, Germany
- Final run: 4 November 2007
- Race type: Flat / Thoroughbred
- Website: Bremen

Race information
- Distance: 1,600 metres (1 mile)
- Surface: Turf
- Track: Right-handed
- Qualification: Three-years-old and up
- Weight: 56 kg (3yo); 58 kg (4yo+); Allowances; 2 kg for fillies and mares 1 kg if not won €12,000 * Penalties; 3 kg for Group 1 winners * 2 kg for Group 2 winners * 1 kg for Group 3 winners * * since January 1
- Purse: €50,000 (2007); 1st: €32,000

The Grosser Preis der Freien Hansestadt Bremen was a Group 3 flat horse race in Germany open to thoroughbreds aged three years or older. It was run at Bremen over a distance of 1,600 metres (about 1 mile), and it was scheduled to take place each year in late October or early November.

The event was given Group 3 status in 2002, and it remained at Bremen until 2006. It was staged at Hanover as the Grosser Preis des Autoring Hannover in 2007.

The race was discontinued in 2008.

== Records ==
Most successful horse:

- no horse won this race more than once in the period shown

Leading jockey:

- no jockey won this race more than once in the period shown

Leading trainer since 2002 (2 wins):

- Erika Mäder – Up and Away (2002), Lucidor (2006)

== Winners since 2002 ==
Year	Winner	Age	Jockey	Trainer	Time
2002	Up and Away	8	Alexander Pietsch	Erika Mäder	1:40.47
2003	Capital Secret	6	Marc Timpelan	Mario Hofer	1:41.25
2004	Tiberius Caesar	4	Andreas Suborics	Peter Schiergen	1:37.96
2005	König Turf	3	Torsten Mundry	Christian Sprengel	1:38.85
2006	Lucidor	3	Eduardo Pedroza	Erika Mäder	1:37.39
2007	Mharadono ^{[a]}	4	Wladimir Panov	Peter Hirschberger	1:46.59

^{a} The 2007 running took place at Hanover.

== See also ==
- List of German flat horse races
