= EuropaChampionat =

- Class: Group 2
- Location: Hoppegarten Racecourse; Hoppegarten, Germany
- Inaugurated: 1992
- Final run: 19 August 2001
- Race type: Flat / Thoroughbred
- Website: Hoppegarten

Race information
- Distance: 2,400 metres (1½ miles)
- Surface: Turf
- Track: Right-handed
- Qualification: Three-year-olds
- Weight: 58 kg Allowances; 2 kg for fillies
- Purse: 200,000 DM (2001); 1st: 120,000 DM

The EuropaChampionat was a Group 2 flat horse race in Germany open to three-year-old thoroughbreds. It was run at Hoppegarten over a distance of 2,400 metres (about 1½ miles), and it was scheduled to take place each year in August.

The event was established in 1992, and it was initially classed at Group 3 level. It was promoted to Group 2 status in 1995.

The EuropaChampionat remained at Hoppegarten until 2000. It was contested at Frankfurt over 2,450 metres in 2001, and discontinued in 2002.

== Records ==
Leading jockey (2 wins):

- Mark Rimmer – Platini (1992), Kornado (1993)
- Andreas Boschert – Baroon (1997), Belenus (1999)

Leading trainer (3 wins):

- Bruno Schütz – Platini (1992), Kornado (1993), Flying Dream (1994)

== Winners ==
Year	Winner	Jockey	Trainer	Time
1992	Platini	Mark Rimmer	Bruno Schütz	2:28.70
1993	Kornado	Mark Rimmer	Bruno Schütz	2:29.30
1994	Flying Dream	Terence Hellier	Bruno Schütz	2:34.80
1995	All My Dreams	Kevin Woodburn	Harro Remmert	2:26.20
1996	Bad Bertrich Again	Georg Bocskai	Andreas Löwe	2:28.60
1997	Baroon	Andreas Boschert	Andreas Wöhler	2:33.00
1998	Central Park	Daragh O'Donohoe	Saeed bin Suroor	2:28.90
1999	Belenus	Andreas Boschert	Andreas Wöhler	2:31.00
2000	Wild Side	Torsten Mundry	Peter Rau	2:32.10
2001	Noroit (Note: The 2001 running took place at Frankfurt over 2,450 metres)	Christian Czachary	Wolfgang Figge	2:38.57

== See also ==
- List of German flat horse races
