= Horner Rennbahn =

Horse racing venue in Horn, Hamburg, Germany

Galopprennbahn Hamburg-Horn^{"Horner Rennbahn", "Die Derby-Bahn"}
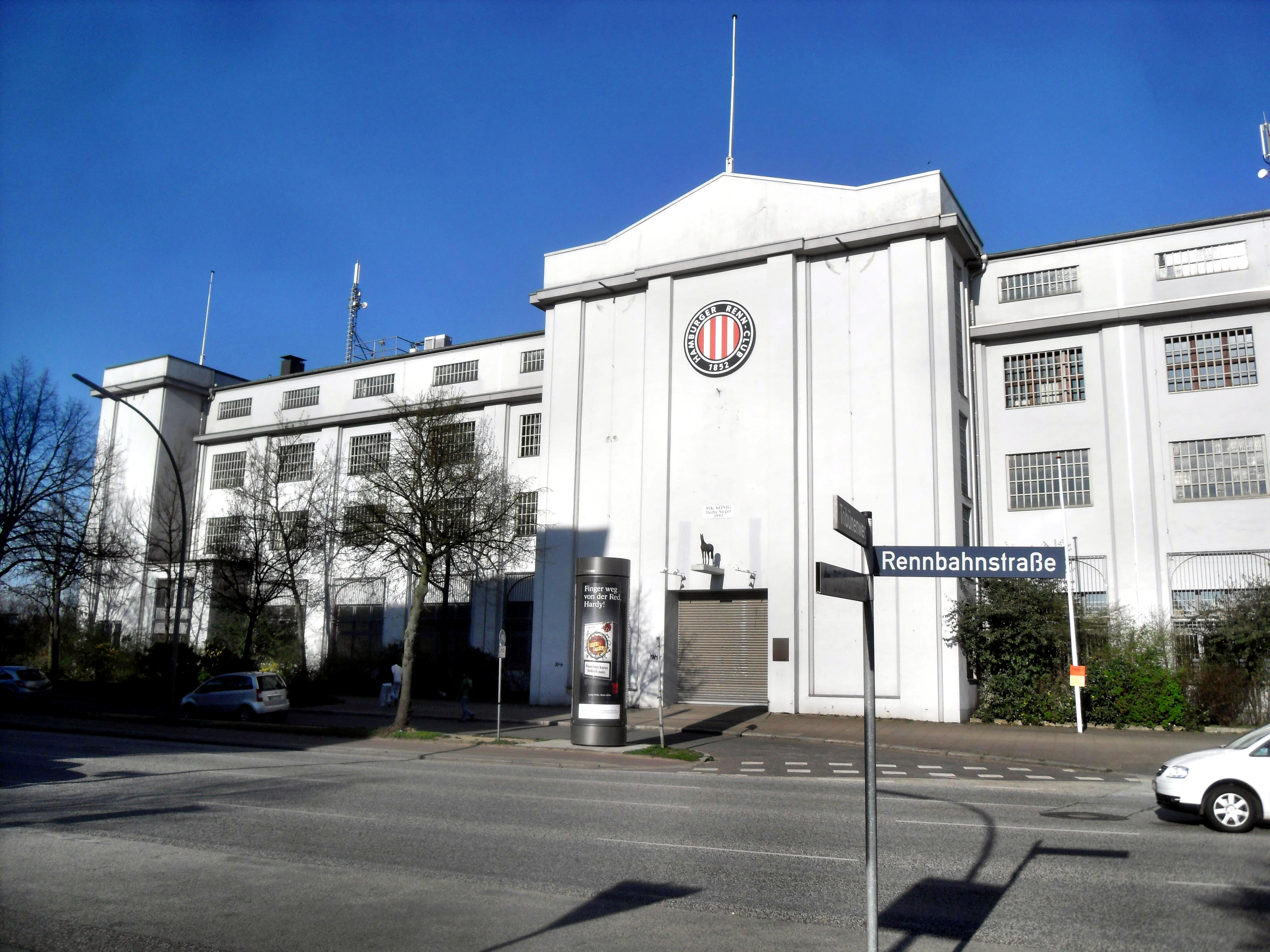
- Street side of one of the grandstands, logo of Hamburger Renn-Club in the center
- Location: Rennbahnstraße 96; 22111 Hamburg, Germany
- Coordinates: 53°33′30″N 10°5′6″E
- Owned by: Hamburger Renn-Club e.V.
- Date opened: 1855
- Course type: Flat
- Notable races: Deutsches Derby; Hansa-Preis; Flieger Trophy; Hamburger Stutenmeile; Hamburger Stuten-Preis
- Attendance: 50,000

Galopprennbahn Hamburg-Horn (Hamburg-Horn Racecourse), also known as Horner Rennbahn, is a major horse racing venue located in Horn, Hamburg, Germany. It is Germany's oldest horse-racing track, built in 1855. It has a capacity of 50,000 spectators. Since 1869 it hosts the annual Deutsches Derby on distances from 1,000 m (3,300 ft) to 3,600 m (11,800 ft), among others.

The nearest public transit station is Horner Rennbahn station of Hamburg U-Bahn.

== See also ==
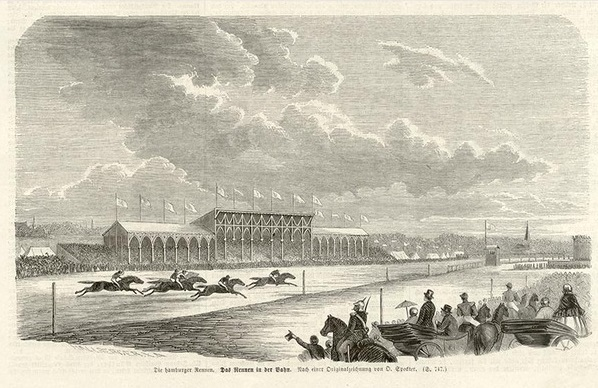
Horse racing at Horner Rennbahn in 1860

- List of German flat horse races
- List of horse racing venues by capacity
