= Cologne-Weidenpesch Racecourse =

Horse racing track in Cologne, Germany

Weidenpesch Racecourse
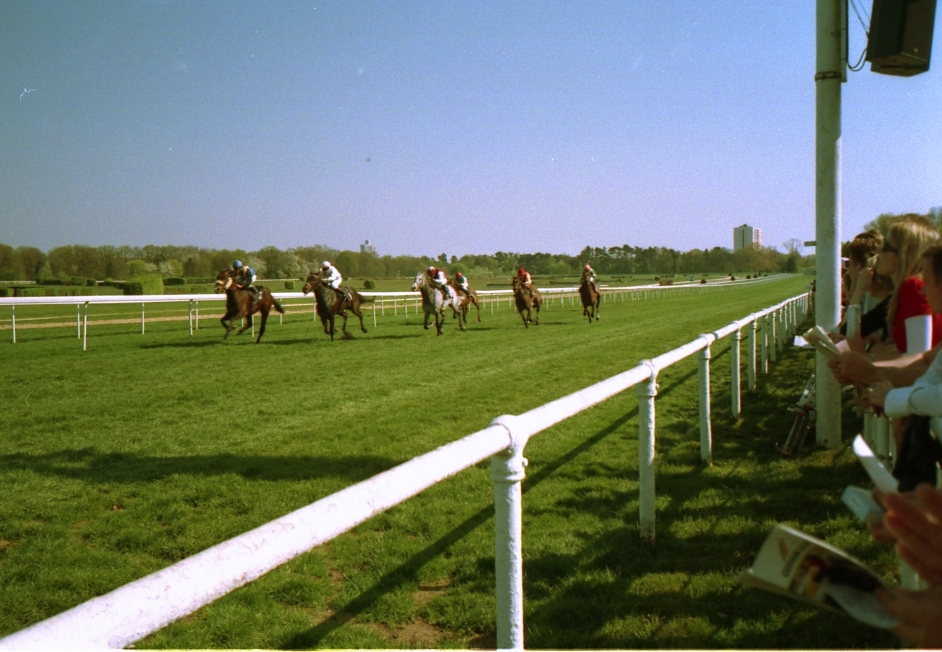
- Weidenpesch Racecourse in 2010
- Interactive map of Weidenpesch Racecourse
- Location: Weidenpescher Park, Cologne, Germany
- Coordinates: 50°59′0″N 6°57′07″E
- Owned by: Kölner Rennverein 1897 e.V.
- Date opened: 1898
- Course type: Flat

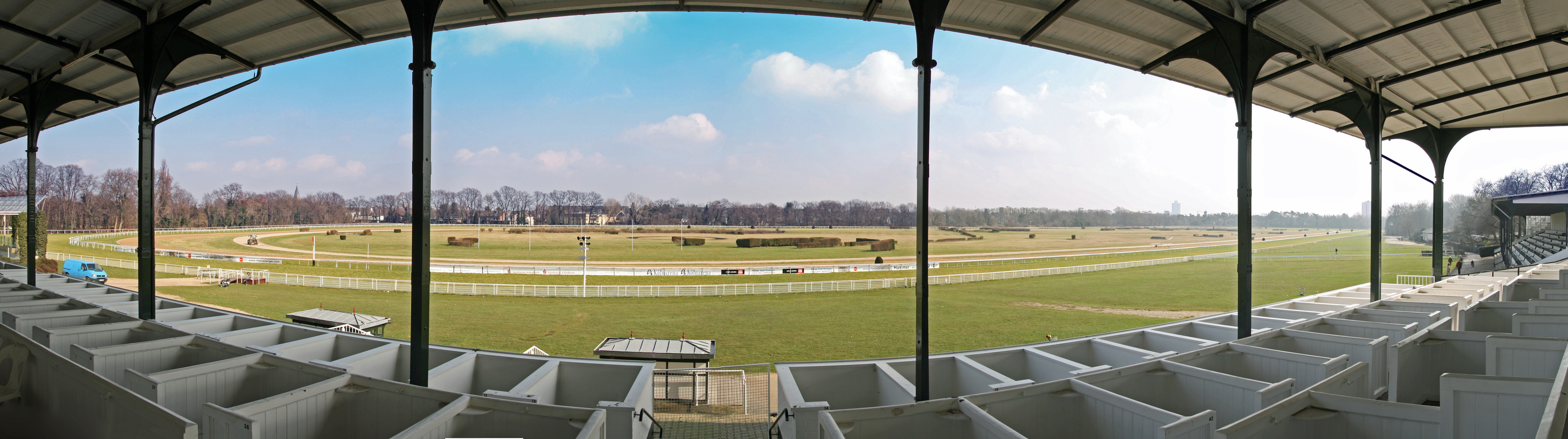
Panoramic view as seen from the old grandstand

The Cologne-Weidenpesch Racecourse (Galopprennbahn Köln-Weidenpesch) is a horse racing track at Weidenpescher Park in Nippes, Cologne. As the only race course in Germany hosting more than one European pattern Group 1 race, Weidenpesch is one of the most prominent tracks in the country.

Cologne-Weidenpesch is also one of Germany's oldest horse-racing tracks, having been established as a race course in 1897. The larger of the two grandstands was designed as a cast iron and timber framing structure in 1898 and substantially renovated in 2004. Until recently, the sportsgrounds were also home to Cologne's oldest football club, the VfL Köln 99.

== Races ==
The Weidenpesch Racecourse hosts several annual conditions races:

- Group 1:
  - Preis von Europa and
  - Rheinland-Pokal
- Group 2:
  - Gerling-Preis,
  - Grosse Europa-Meile,
  - Mehl-Mülhens-Rennen and
  - Oppenheim-Union-Rennen
- Group 3:
  - Schwarzgold-Rennen,
  - Silberne Peitsche and
  - Preis des Winterfavoriten

The Gerling-Preis, originally established as "Preis von Birlinghoven" in 1921, and from 1934 onwards, named and sponsored by Robert Gerling, is the oldest sponsored race prize in the country. Other major races include the Preis von Europa and the Mehl-Mülhens-Rennen. The Cologne racing association (Kölner Rennverein) organizes horse races throughout the entire year.

== See also ==
- List of German flat horse races
