= John Reid (jockey) =

Northern Irish jockey

John Andrew Reid MBE (born 6 August 1955 in Banbridge County Down, Northern Ireland) is a retired flat race jockey.

Reid served as an apprentice in his native Ireland to Leslie Crawford, before moving to England and joining Verley Bewicke. His first Classic victory came in the 1982 1,000 Guineas aboard On The House. His first major Group 1 race win came in the 1978 King George VI and Queen Elizabeth Stakes at Ascot on Ile de Bourbon. Reid won this race for a second time in 1997 on Swain, when the top-class thoroughbreds Helissio, Singspiel and Pilsudski were all beaten off.

His biggest victory came on Dr Devious in the 1992 Epsom Derby for the trainer Peter Chapple-Hyam. He also won the 1988 Prix de l'Arc de Triomphe on Tony Bin. John was also successful in the 1,000 Guineas in 1994 on Las Meninas and in the St. Leger Stakes in 1998 on Nedawi.

Reid considered retirement in 1999 after a heavy fall at Kempton Park, but kept going for another two years until announcing his retirement in September 2001, and becoming president of the Jockeys Association.

John Reid was made an MBE in 1997 for his services to horse racing.

In total, John Reid rode 1,937 winners in the UK, and gained 48 international Group 1 race victories during his career.

In 1987, on the BBC's television sports quiz A Question of Sport, Emlyn Hughes mistook a heavily-muddied picture of Princess Anne on a horse to be Reid.

John lives in Oxfordshire, with his partner Ali Graham. He coaches jockeys.
