= Andreas Schütz =

German horse trainer

Andreas Schutz
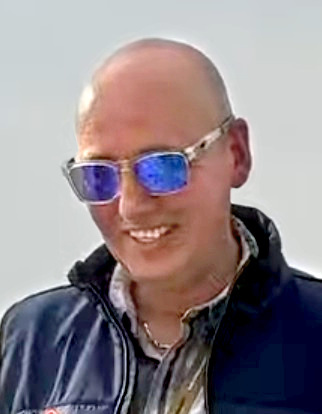
- Schütz in 2023

Personal information
- Born: 19 February 1968 (age 58) Germany
- Occupation: Trainer

Horse racing career
- Sport: Horse racing
- Career wins: Not found

Racing awards
- German Leading trainer by wins (4)

Significant horses
- Elle Danzig, Shirocco, Good Ba Ba, Samum, Caitano, Borgia, Dai Jin, Robertico, Waky Nao, Epalo

Andreas Schütz (born 19 February 1968) is a Thoroughbred racehorse trainer. From a prominent racing family, he is the fourth generation to train professionally.

Andreas Schütz started out as an amateur jockey, winning four German championships from 1984–1987 and the European championship in 1987. In 1992 he began working as an assistant trainer for his father Bruno Schütz who had built one of the Germany's most successful public training stables. Due to health problems, his father retired and in 1998 Andreas took over the running of the stable.

Highly successful, Andreas Schütz has won numerous German Group one races including the five wins in both the Deutsches Derby and the Preis der Diana. Four times he has been his country's annual leading trainer in wins. He was won several Group One races in Italy and in 2004 won the Singapore Airlines International Cup at Kranji Racecourse in Singapore.

In 2006 Andreas Schütz set up shop in Hong Kong, China where he has continued to win major races. After taking over the conditioning of Good Ba Ba, he guided the gelding to four consecutive Group One race wins and 2007/2008 Hong Kong Horse of the Year honors. In December 2008, Good Ba Ba gave Schütz his second consecutive Hong Kong Mile. Schutz trained 24 winners in 2010/11 for an overall total in Hong Kong of 102. In 2013/14, he trained 15 winners for an overall total in Hong Kong of 159.

== Major wins ==
Bayerisches Zuchtrennen (1998)
Berlin Brandenburg-Trophy (1998, 2001, 2005)
Deutsches Derby (1998, 2000, 2002, 2003, 2004)
German 1,000 Guineas (1998, 2001)
Hansa-Preis (1998, 1999, 2000, 2003)
Preis der Diana (1998, 1999, 2002, 2003, 2004)
Premio Lydia Tesio (1998)
Premio Vittorio di Capua (1998)
Diana-Trial (1999, 2001, 2004)
Grosser Preis der Badischen Wirtschaft (1999, 2003)
Premio Roma (1999, 2000)
Grosser Preis von Baden (2000)
Union-Rennen (2000, 2002, 2003)
Gerling-Preis (2001, 2003)
Rheinland-Pokal (2003)
Gran Premio del Jockey Club (2004)
Grosse Europa-Meile (2004)
Singapore Airlines International Cup (2004)
St. Leger Italiano (2005)
Hong Kong Mile (2007, 2008)
Champions Mile (2008)
Hong Kong Stewards' Cup (2008, 2009)

== Performance ==
| Seasons | Total Runners | Total Wins | Total places | Group 1 wins | Group 1 places | Stakes won |
|---|---|---|---|---|---|---|
| 2000/2024 | 4088 | 370 | 675 | 16 | 25 | |
