= Heinz Jentzsch =

German racehorse trainer

- Born: 13 March 1920; Hoppegarten, Prussia, Weimar Republic
- Died: 21 April 2012 (aged 92); Baden-Baden, Germany
- Occupation: Horse trainer
- Years active: 1942–1999

Heinz Jentzsch (13 March 1920 – 21 April 2012) was the most successful horse trainer in the history of German horse racing.

== Career ==
During his active years from 1942 to 1999, Jentzsch recorded 4,029 victories. After World War II he came to Cologne to train for the 'Stallgemeinschaft Asterblüte', a group of major German owners of race-horses (Gestüte Schlenderhan, Fährhof, Bona, Charlottenhof, Ittlingen). From 1960 to 1994, he was the most successful coach, winning the German trainer-championship 31 times. He won 21 German trainer-championships in succession from 1967 to 1987. He won the Deutsches Derby eight times (filling the first three places in 1985), the Preis der Diana eleven times and the Japan Cup with Lando. He was also the mentor of Georg Bocskai and Peter Schiergen.

== Derby winners ==
Heinz Jentzsch trained eight derby winners:

- 1969: Don Giovanni
- 1970: Alpenkönig
- 1976: Stuyvesant
- 1978: Zauberer
- 1984: Lagunas
- 1985: Acatenango
- 1993: Lando
- 1994: Laroche

== Death ==
Jentzsch died at the age of 92 on 21 April 2012.
