= Weltreisende =

Japanese Thoroughbred racehorse (2017–2025)

Weltreisende ヴェルトライゼンデ
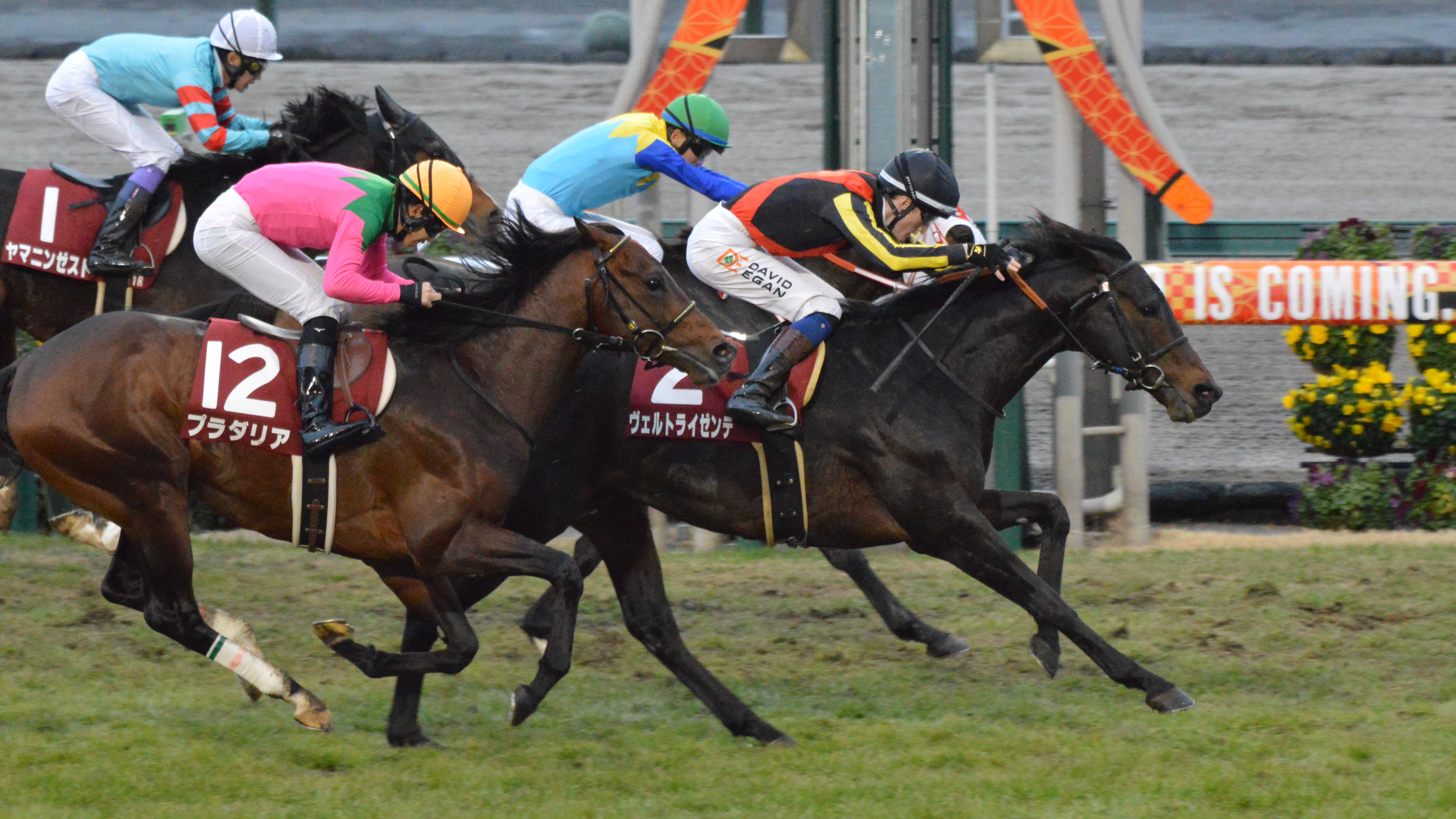
- Weltreisende winning the 2023 Nikkei Shinshun Hai
- Breed: Thoroughbred
- Sire: Dream Journey
- Grandsire: Stay Gold
- Dam: Mandela
- Damsire: Acatenango
- Sex: Stallion
- Foaled: 8 February 2017
- Died: 29 March 2025 (aged 8)
- Country: Japan
- Color: Dark Bay
- Breeder: Northern Farm
- Owner: Sunday Racing
- Racing colours
- Trainer: Yasutoshi Ikee
- Jockey: Damian Lane; David Egan; Kenichi Ikezoe
- Record: 16: 4-4-2
- Earnings: ¥378,047,000

Major wins
- Naruo Kinen (2022); Nikkei Shinshun Hai (2023)

Weltreisende (Japanese: ヴェルトライゼンデ, 8 February 2017 – 29 March 2025) was a Japanese Thoroughbred racehorse. He was active from 2019 to 2025 and had a total earnings of 378,047,000 JPY.

== Background ==
Weltreisende was born on February 8, 2017, on Northern Farm located in Abira, Hokkaido. His sire, Dream Journey, was sired by Stay Gold, who was known for siring other notable racehorses such as Orfevre, Gold Ship, and Oju Chosan. His dam, Mandela, was a German-bred racehorse who was sired by Acatenango, an outstanding sire in Germany and a three-time German Horse of the Year. Mandela also foaled World Ace and World Premiere, making them half brothers to Weltreisende.

== Racing Record ==
During his career, he won 4 out of 16 races. He also placed 2nd in 4 races and was in 3rd place twice. The table below shows his racing career, which was taken from netkeiba.

Date	Race	Distance	Surface	Track	Finish	Field	Time	Jockey	Winner (Runner-up)
2019 – two-year-old season
Sep 1	2YO Debut	1800m	Turf	Kokura	1st	12	1:51.6	Yuga Kawada	(Dancing Richie)
Oct 26	Hagi Stakes	1800m	Turf	Kyoto	1st	7	1:50.8	Christophe Soumillon	(Serious Fool)
Dec 28	Hopeful Stakes	2000m	Turf	Nakayama	2nd	13	2:01.6	Oisin Murphy	Contrail
2020 – three-year-old season
Mar 22	Spring Stakes	1800m	Turf	Nakayama	2nd	10	1:50.0	Kenichi Ikezoe	Galore Creek
Apr 19	Satsuki Shō	2000m	Turf	Nakayama	8th	18	2:01.9	Kenichi Ikezoe	Contrail
May 31	Tōkyō Yūshun	2400m	Turf	Tokyo	3rd	18	2:24.9	Kenichi Ikezoe	Contrail
Sep 27	Kobe Shimbun Hai	2200m	Turf	Chukyo	2nd	18	2:12.8	Kenichi Ikezoe	Contrail
Oct 25	Kikuka-shō	3000m	Turf	Kyoto	7th	18	3:06.9	Kenichi Ikezoe	Contrail
2021 – four-year-old season
Jan 24	American Jockey Club Cup	2200m	Turf	Nakayama	2nd	17	2:18.0	Kenichi Ikezoe	Aristoteles
2022 – five-year-old season
Jun 4	Naruo Kinen	2000m	Turf	Chukyo	1st	10	1:57.7	Damian Lane	(Geraldina)
Sep 25	Sankei Sho All Comers	2200m	Turf	Nakayama	7th	13	2:13.7	Keita Tosaki	Geraldina
Nov 7	Japan Cup	2400m	Turf	Tokyo	3rd	18	2:23.8	Damian Lane	Vela Azul
2023 – six-year-old season
Jan 15	Nikkei Shinshun Hai	2200m	Turf	Chukyo	1st	14	2:14.2	David Egan	(King of Dragon)
Apr 2	Osaka Hai	2000m	Turf	Hanshin	9th	16	1:58.1	Yuga Kawada	Jack d'Or
2024 – seven-year-old season
Jun 9	Epsom Cup	1800m	Turf	Tokyo	9th	18	1:45.4	Keita Tosaki	Lebensstil
2025 – eight-year-old season
Jan 19	Nikkei Shinshun Hai	2200m	Turf	Chukyo	10th	16	2:11.5	Aurélien Lemaitre	Lord del Rey

== Pedigree ==
Pedigree of Weltreisende, dark bay, 2017
Sire Dream Journey 2004	Stay Gold; 1994	Sunday Silence	Halo
Sire Dream Journey 2004	Stay Gold; 1994	Sunday Silence	Wishing Well
Sire Dream Journey 2004	Stay Gold; 1994	Golden Sash	Dictus
Sire Dream Journey 2004	Stay Gold; 1994	Golden Sash	Dyna Sash
Sire Dream Journey 2004	Oriental Art; 1997	Mejiro McQueen	Mejiro Titan
Sire Dream Journey 2004	Oriental Art; 1997	Mejiro McQueen	Mejiro Aurola
Sire Dream Journey 2004	Oriental Art; 1997	Electro Art	Northern Taste
Sire Dream Journey 2004	Oriental Art; 1997	Electro Art	Grandma Stevens
Dam Mandela 2000	Acatenango; 1982	Surumu	Literat
Dam Mandela 2000	Acatenango; 1982	Surumu	Surama
Dam Mandela 2000	Acatenango; 1982	Aggravate	Agressor
Dam Mandela 2000	Acatenango; 1982	Aggravate	Raven Locks
Dam Mandela 2000	Mandellicht; 1994	Be My Guest	Northern Dancer
Dam Mandela 2000	Mandellicht; 1994	Be My Guest	What a Treat
Dam Mandela 2000	Mandellicht; 1994	Mandelauge	Elektrant
Dam Mandela 2000	Mandellicht; 1994	Mandelauge	Mandriale
