= Lando (horse) =

German-bred Thoroughbred racehorse

- Lando at the 1995 Prix de l'Arc de Triomphe with Michael Roberts
- Sire: Acatenango
- Grandsire: Surumu
- Dam: Laurea
- Damsire: Sharpman
- Sex: Stallion
- Foaled: 23 January 1990
- Country: Germany
- Colour: Bay
- Breeder: Gestut Hof Ittlingen
- Owner: Gestut Haus Ittlingen
- Trainer: Heinz Jentzsch
- Record: 23: 10-2-1
- Earnings: €2,892,802

Major wins
- Preis des Winterfavoriten (1992); Deutsches Derby (1993); Grosser Preis von Baden (1993, 1994); Hansa Preis (1994); Gran Premio del Jockey Club (1994); Gran Premio di Milano (1995); Preis der Privatbankiers Merck, Finck & Co (1995); Japan Cup (1995)

Awards
- German Horse of the Year (1994, 1995); Timeform rating 125 (1993), 123 (1994), 128 (1995)

Lando (23 January 1990 – 20 August 2013) was a German Thoroughbred racehorse and sire. He was twice named German Horse of the Year and set an earnings record for a horse trained in Germany. He was one of the best juveniles in Germany in 1990, winning the Preis des Winterfavoriten and went on to greater success in 1993 when he won the Deutsches Derby and the Grosser Preis von Baden. He continued to improve as a four-year-old, winning the Hansa Preis and a second Grosser Preis von Baden in Germany as well as the Gran Premio del Jockey Club in Italy. He had his best year in 1995 when he won the Gran Premio di Milano and the Preis der Privatbankiers Merck, Finck & Co before ending his career with a victory in the Japan Cup. In all, he won 10 of his 23 races, having competed in five different countries on three continents. After his retirement from racing he became a successful breeding stallion. He died in 2013 at the age of 23.

== Background ==
Lando was a "powerfully-built" bay horse standing 16.1 hands high bred in Germany by Gestut Hof Ittlingen. He was sired by Acatenango, a three-time German Horse of the Year whose other progeny include the Prix du Jockey Club winner Blue Canari and the Hong Kong Vase winner Borgia. His dam Laurea produced several other winners including the 1994 Deutsches Derby winner Laroche, and was a daughter of the German 1,000 Guineas winner Licata.

During his racing career, Lando carried the colours of Gestut Haus Ittlingen and was trained by Heinz Jentzsch.

== Racing career ==
=== 1992: two-year-old season ===
Lando began his racing career by finishing second in a maiden race at Cologne on 22 August and then won the Junioren Preis at Düsseldorf a month later. On 18 October he contested Germany's most prestigious race for juveniles, the Preis des Winterfavoriten over 1600 metres at Cologne and won from Kornado and Henderson.

=== 1993: three-year-old season ===
Lando made little impact in his first three starts of 1993. He finished fifth in the Dr. Busch-Memorial, ninth in the Mehl-Mülhens-Rennen and seventh in the Union-Rennen, with all three races being won by Kornado. He faced Kornado yet again in the Deutsches Derby at Hamburg Racecourse on 4 July and started a 23.5/1 outsider. The 1993 Derby was the first running of the race which had been open to horses bred outside Germany and foreign bred-horses took eleven of the places in the nineteen-runner field. Ridden by Andreas Tylicki Lando won by one and a half lengths from Monsun, with the favoured Sternkoenig in third and Kornado unplaced.

In the EuropaChampionat at Hoppegarten he was again beaten by Kornado when he finished second, with the British-trained colts River North and Beneficial in third and fourth and the Grand Prix de Paris winner Fort Wood in fifth. In September Lando was matched against older horses for the first time when he contested the Group One Grosser Preis von Baden over 2400 metres at Ifflezheim Racecourse. His opponents included Sapience (Jockey Club Stakes, Princess of Wales's Stakes) and Ruby Tiger (E. P. Taylor Stakes, Nassau Stakes) from England, George Augustus (Tattersalls Gold Cup) from Ireland and the 1992 German Horse of the Year Platini. Ridden again by Tylicki, Lando took the led 200 metres from the finish and won by a neck from Platini with a gap of six lengths back to George Augustus in third.

=== 1994: four-year-old season ===
Lando began his third season by finishing unplaced behind Kornado in the Grosser Preis der Wirtschaft on heavy ground before contesting the Group Two Hamsa Preis over 2200 metres at Hamburg on 26 June. Ridden by Peter Schiergen he took the lead 300 metres from the finish and won by half a length from Sternkoenig. Lando was beaten in his next two raced, taking fourth behind Sternkoenig in the Preis der Privatbankiers Merck, Finck & Co (now the Grosser Preis von Berlin) and then finishing fifth behind the British-trained River North in the Aral-Pokal. On 4 September 1994 Lando, with Schiergen in the saddle, attempted to repeat his 1993 success in the Grosser Preis von Baden. The Jentzch-trained Monsun headed the betting ahead of Kornado and Lando who were made joint-second-favourites at odds of 4.1/1. The other runners included the Lando's half-brother Laroche and the French challenger Vert Amande, winner of the Prix Ganay. After being restrained by Schiergen, Lando made progress in the straight, took the lead 200 metres out, and won by two lengths from Monsun with Kornado two and a half lengths back in third.

Lando raced outside Germany for the first time when he was sent to France to contest the Prix de l'Arc de Triomphe at Longchamp Racecourse on 2 October. Ridden for the first time by the South African jockey Michael Roberts he finished eighth of the twenty runners, three lengths behind the winner Carnegie. The horses finishing behind Lando included King's Theatre, Celtic Arms and Intrepidity. Two weeks later, the colt appeared in Italy when he was one of seven horses to contest the Group One Gran Premio del Jockey Club at Milan. Roberts tracked the Jentzsch-trained pacemaker Embarcadero before sending Lando into the lead 500 metres from the finish. The German colt drew away from his opponents in the closing stages and won by six lengths from the French-trained Suave Tern.

His performances in 1994 saw him voted German Horse of the Year.

=== 1995: five-year-old season ===
In 1995, as in 1994, Lando began his campaign with a defeat in the Grosser Preis der Wirtschaft, on this occasion taking third behind the French colt Freedom Cry and the British horse Alderbrook. Lando was accompanied by his pacemaker Embarcadero when he was sent to Italy for a second time to contest the Group One Gran Premio di Milano on 18 June. His main opposition appeared to come from the British challengers Broadway Flyer (Chester Vase, Gordon Stakes), Strategic Choice (John Porter Stakes) and Linney Head (Sandown Classic Trial). Embarcadero made the running before giving way to Broadway Flyer in the straight, but Roberts produced Lando to overtake the British colt 200 metres from the finish and won by two and a quarter lengths.

In July, Lando returned to Germany for the Preis der Privatbankiers Merck, Finck & Co at Düsseldorf in July in which he was again opposed by Kornado and Laroche. Ridden by Schiergen, he turned into the straight in third before taking the lead and accelerating clear to win by two and a half lengths and three lengths from Laroche and Kornado. In September Lando started favourite in his attempt to win a third consecutive Grosser Preis von Baden but finished seventh behind the filly Germany. On 1 October Lando made his second bid for the Prix de l'Arc de Triomphe and finished fourth of the sixteen runners behind Lammtarra, Freedom Cry and Swain. Four weeks later, Lando was sent to the United States for the twelfth running of the Breeders' Cup Turf at Belmont Park. He tracked the leaders but faded badly in the straight and finished twelfth of thirteen behind Northern Spur.

On his final racecourse appearance, Lando contested the 15th running of the Japan Cup over 2400 metres in front of a record 180,760 crowd at Tokyo Racecourse on 26 November. The race featured six Japanese horses facing eight overseas challengers. The "home team" comprised Narita Brian, Nice Nature, Hishi Amazon (Hanshin Juvenile Fillies, Queen Elizabeth II Commemorative Cup), Royce And Royce, Taiki Blizzard and Matikanetannhauser. The rest of the overseas contingent was made up of Sandpit and Awad from the United States, Hernando and Carling (Prix de Diane, Prix Vermeille) from France, Danewin (Rosehill Guineas, Mackinnon Stakes) and Stony Bay (Ranvet Stakes) from Australia and Pure Grain from England. Lando was restrained on the outside of the field by Roberts before turning into the straight in sixth place. He overtook the pace-setting Taiki Blizzard 200 metres from the finish and held of late challenges from Hishi Amazon and Hernando to win by one and a half lengths and a neck.

Lando's victory in Japan took his earnings to €2,892,802, a record for a horse trained in Germany. His achievements in 1995 saw him being voted German Horse of the Year for a second time. Roberts considers his victory with Lando his greatest memory,

== Stud record ==
Lando was retired from racing to become a breeding stallion at Gestut Hof Ittlingen and later stood in France at Haras d'Etreham. His best winners included:

- Paolini (1997), Premio Presidente della Repubblica, Gran Premio di Milano, Dubai Duty Free, German Horse of the Year (2002)
- Caracciola (1997), Cesarewitch, Queen Alexandra Stakes
- Epalo (1999), Singapore Airlines International Cup
- Gonbarda (2002), Grosser Preis von Berlin, Preis von Europa, (dam of Farhh)
- Air Force One (2002), Punchestown Champion Novice Chase
- Prince Flori (2003), Grosser Preis von Baden
- Scalo (2007), Preis von Europa
- Sound (2013), Zipping Classic (twice)

In August 2013 he underwent surgery for colic. Although the operation was successful he sustained a leg fracture when attempting to stand up as he recovered from the anasthaetic and was euthanized on 20 August. The stud's owners issued a statement saying "He was the best horse we have bred on our farm. He was always an outstanding horse with an impeccable physique, a great interior, pride, fighting spirit, and toughness."

== Pedigree ==
Pedigree of Lando (GER), bay stallion, 1990
Sire Acatenango (GER) 1982	Surumu (GER); 1974	Literat	Birkhahn
Sire Acatenango (GER) 1982	Surumu (GER); 1974	Literat	Lis
Sire Acatenango (GER) 1982	Surumu (GER); 1974	Surama	Reliance
Sire Acatenango (GER) 1982	Surumu (GER); 1974	Surama	Suncourt
Sire Acatenango (GER) 1982	Aggravate (GB); 1966	Aggressor	Combat
Sire Acatenango (GER) 1982	Aggravate (GB); 1966	Aggressor	Phaetonia
Sire Acatenango (GER) 1982	Aggravate (GB); 1966	Raven Locks	Mr Jinks
Sire Acatenango (GER) 1982	Aggravate (GB); 1966	Raven Locks	Gentlemen's Relish
Dam Laurea (IRE) 1983	Sharpman (IRE); 1976	Sharpen Up	Atan
Dam Laurea (IRE) 1983	Sharpman (IRE); 1976	Sharpen Up	Rocchetta
Dam Laurea (IRE) 1983	Sharpman (IRE); 1976	Miss Manon	Bon Mot
Dam Laurea (IRE) 1983	Sharpman (IRE); 1976	Miss Manon	Miss Molly
Dam Laurea (IRE) 1983	Licata (GER); 1973	Dschingis Khan	Tamerlane
Dam Laurea (IRE) 1983	Licata (GER); 1973	Dschingis Khan	Donna Diana
Dam Laurea (IRE) 1983	Licata (GER); 1973	Liberty	Birkhahn
Dam Laurea (IRE) 1983	Licata (GER); 1973	Liberty	Lis (Family 7-b)

- Lando was inbred 4 × 4 to Birkhahn and Lis, meaning that these horses appear twice in the fourth generation of his pedigree.
