= Torquator Tasso =

German racehorse

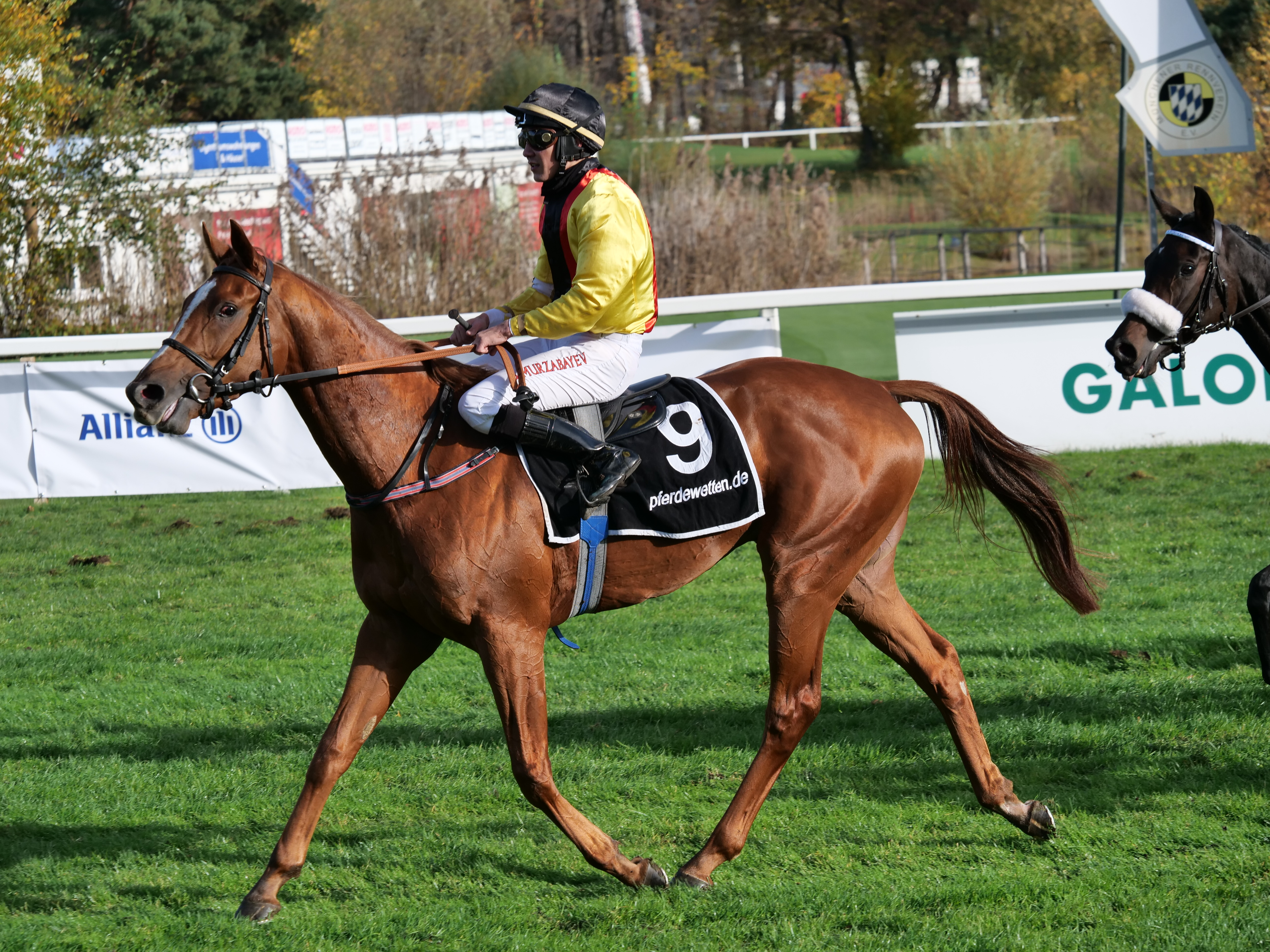
- Torquator Tasso at Munich in November 2020
- Sire: Adlerflug
- Grandsire: In The Wings
- Dam: Tijuana
- Damsire: Toylsome
- Sex: Stallion
- Foaled: 21 April 2017
- Country: Germany
- Color: Chestnut
- Breeder: Paul H Vandeberg
- Owner: Gestut Auenquelle
- Trainer: Marcel Weiss
- Record: 16: 6-5-2
- Earnings: £3,635,476

Major wins
- Grosser Preis von Berlin (2020); Hansa-Preis (2021, 2022); Grosser Preis von Baden (2021); Prix de l'Arc de Triomphe (2021)

Awards
- German Horse of the Year (2020-2022)

Torquator Tasso (foaled 21 April 2017) is a German Thoroughbred racehorse. He was named German Horse of the Year for three consecutive years starting in 2020 when he won the Grosser Preis von Berlin and was placed in the Deutsches Derby, Grosser Preis von Baden and Grosser Preis von Bayern. In the following year he won the Hansa-Preis and the Grosser Preis von Baden before recording an upset victory in the Prix de l'Arc de Triomphe. A year later he came in third in the same race, cementing his status as one of the best German racehorses in recent history.

== Background ==
Torquator Tasso is a "strapping" chestnut horse with a white blaze bred in Germany by Paul H Vandeberg. In October 2018 the yearling was put up for auction at the BBAG Mixed Sale and was bought for €24,000 by Gestut Auenquelle. The colt was sent into training at Mulheim with Marcel Weiss, who had taken over the stable in 2019 after working for several years as assistant to Jens Hischberger.

He was from the seventh crop of foals sired by Adlerflug who won the Deutsches Derby in 2007. His other major winners have included In Swoop (second in the Prix de l'Arc de Triomphe), Iquitos (Grosser Preis von Baden) and Ito (Grosser Preis von Bayern). Torquator Tasso's dam Tijuana showed no racing ability but as a descendant of the British broodmare Allegretta she was related to many major winners including King's Best, Urban Sea, Anabaa Blue, Galileo and Sea The Stars.

== Racing career ==
=== 2020: three-year-old season ===
Torquator Tasso did not race as a juvenile and began his track career by finishing fourth in a minor race over 2000 metres at Mulheim Racecourse on 9 May. In the following month he started at odds of 1.8/1 for a race over 2200 metres at Cologne-Weidenpesch Racecourse when he was ridden by Bauyrzhan Murzabayev and recorded his first success as he won by a length from Fataliste. The colt was then stepped up sharply in class to contest the Group 1 Deutsches Derby at Horner Rennbahn in July when he started a 22/1 outsider but stayed on well in the closing stages to finish second to In Swoop, beaten three quarters of a length by the winner.

In September Torquator Tasso was matched against older horses in the Group 1 Grosser Preis von Baden and did best of the German runners as he came home third behind the British challengers Barney Roy and Communique. On 2 October started favourite for the Group 1 Grosser Preis von Berlin over 2400 metres on good to soft ground at Hoppegarten Racecourse (the race is usually run in August but was rescheduled owing to the COVID-19 pandemic). Ridden by Lukas Delozier he recovered from a slow start to take the lead 200 metres from the finish and held off a late challenge from Dicaprio to win by a short head. On his final start of the year Torquator Tasso started favourite for the Grosser Preis von Bayern at Munich but was beaten a neck into second place by the filly Sunny Queen.

For his performances as a three-year-old Torquator Tasso was voted German Horse of the Year for 2020.

=== 2021: four-year-old season ===
On his first appearance as a four-year-old Torquator Tasso finished sixth behind Kaspar in the Group 2 Grosser Preis der Badischen Wirtschaft at Mulheim in June. In the Hansa-Preis at Hamburg in July the colt was ridden by Rene Piechulek and won in "impressive" style, beating Sunny Queen by four and a half lengths after taking the lead 300 metres from the finish. In August Torquator Tasso started favourite as he attempted to repeat his 2020 success in the Grosser Preis von Berlin but was beaten into second place by the British filly Alpinista. In the Grosser Preis von Baden the colt started favourite against six opponents including Kaspar, Sisfahan (2021 Deutsches Derby) and the Glorious Stakes winner Passion And Glory. Ridden by Piechulek he raced in fourth place before taking the lead 200 metres out and stayed on well to win by a length from Sisfahan. After the race Weiss said "The Arc is the next target. Torquator Tasso passed the test with flying colors, even though the race was very stop-start. Rene Piechulek did a brilliant job."

Four weeks after his win at Baden-Baden, Torquator Tasso (as Weiss predicted) was sent to France to contest the 100th edition of the Prix de l'Arc de Triomphe over 2400 metres on heavy ground at Longchamp Racecourse when he was partnered by Piechulek and started a 72/1 outsider. Hurricane Lane started favourite while the other contenders included Adayar, Tarnawa, Snowfall, Chrono Genesis, Broome and Sealiway. He raced in mid-division before making steady progress on the outside approaching the straight. He maintained his run, overhauled Hurricane Lane and Tarnawa in the last 50 metres and won by three quarters of a length. He became the third German-trained winner of the race after Star Appeal (1975) and Danedream (2011). Weiss explained "We started to plan for the Arc last winter. I thought this was the strongest Arc of the last few years but I still thought he deserved to go to the start. We would have been very happy if he had finished third, fourth, fifth, or sixth. We would have considered that a success. The fact he has won is a bonus."

== Pedigree ==
Pedigree of Torquator Tasso, chestnut colt, 2017
Sire Adlerflug (GER) 2004	In the Wings (GB); 1986	Sadler's Wells (USA)	Northern Dancer (CAN)
Sire Adlerflug (GER) 2004	In the Wings (GB); 1986	Sadler's Wells (USA)	Fairy Bridge
Sire Adlerflug (GER) 2004	In the Wings (GB); 1986	High Hawk (IRE)	Shirley Heights (GB)
Sire Adlerflug (GER) 2004	In the Wings (GB); 1986	High Hawk (IRE)	Sunbittern (GB)
Sire Adlerflug (GER) 2004	Aiyana (GER); 1993	Last Tycoon (IRE)	Try My Best (USA)
Sire Adlerflug (GER) 2004	Aiyana (GER); 1993	Last Tycoon (IRE)	Mill Princess
Sire Adlerflug (GER) 2004	Aiyana (GER); 1993	Alya	Lombard
Sire Adlerflug (GER) 2004	Aiyana (GER); 1993	Alya	Anatevka
Dam Tijuana (GER) 2011	Toylsome (GB); 1999	Cadeaux Genereux	Young Generation (IRE)
Dam Tijuana (GER) 2011	Toylsome (GB); 1999	Cadeaux Genereux	Smarten Up
Dam Tijuana (GER) 2011	Toylsome (GB); 1999	Treasure Trove (USA)	The Minstrel (CAN)
Dam Tijuana (GER) 2011	Toylsome (GB); 1999	Treasure Trove (USA)	River Jig
Dam Tijuana (GER) 2011	Tucana (GER); 1999	Acatenango	Surumu
Dam Tijuana (GER) 2011	Tucana (GER); 1999	Acatenango	Aggravate (GB)
Dam Tijuana (GER) 2011	Tucana (GER); 1999	Turbaine (USA)	Trempolino
Dam Tijuana (GER) 2011	Tucana (GER); 1999	Turbaine (USA)	Allegretta (GB) (Family: 9-h)
