= Sea The Moon =

German-bred Thoroughbred racehorse

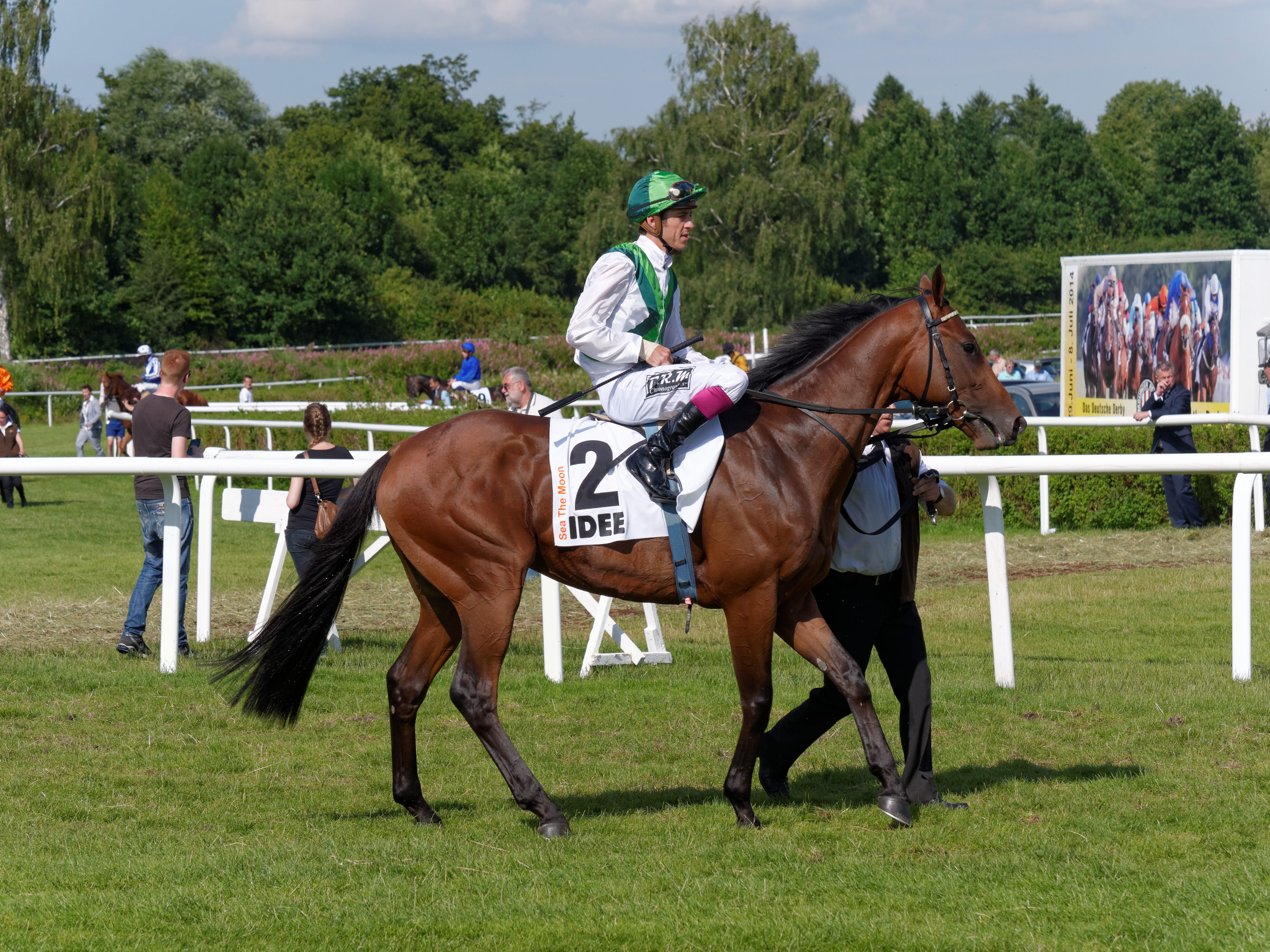
- Sea The Moon before the start of the German Derby
- Sire: Sea The Stars
- Grandsire: Cape Cross
- Dam: Sanwa
- Damsire: Monsun
- Sex: Colt
- Foaled: 29 April 2011
- Country: Germany
- Colour: Bay
- Breeder: Gestüt Görlsdorf
- Owner: Gestüt Görlsdorf
- Trainer: Markus Klug
- Record: 5: 4–1–0

Major wins
- Frühjahrs Dreijährigen-Preis (2014); Union-Rennen (2014); Deutsches Derby (2014)

Sea The Moon (foaled 27 January 2011) is a retired German Thoroughbred racehorse who won the 2014 Deutsches Derby. He was trained by Markus Klug, and bred and owned by Gestut Görlsdorf.

== Background ==
Sea The Moon is a bay colt bred by Gestüt Görlsdorf and foaled on 29 April 2011. He was sired by Sea The Stars, who was undefeated as a three-year-old, winning the 2000 Guineas, Derby, Eclipse Stakes, International Stakes, Irish Champion Stakes and Prix de l'Arc de Triomphe. Sea The Moon is one of Sea The Stars' first crop of foals, which also includes Oaks winner Taghrooda. Sea The Moon's dam is Sanwa, a daughter of Monsun. Sea The Moon is trained by Markus Klug.

== Racing career ==
=== 2013: Two-year-old season ===
Sea The Moon only raced once as a two-year-old, when he won a race at Cologne-Weidenpesch Racecourse.

=== 2014: Three-year-old season ===
Sea The Moon's first race as a three-year-old was the Frühjahrs Dreijährigen-Preis on 11 May 2014. Jockey Andreas Helfenbein sent him into the lead after the field had traveled one furlong. He was challenged in the finishing straight, but pulled away inside the final furlong to win by two lengths from Abendwind. Just over one month later, Sea The Moon started as favourite for the Union-Rennen. He was again sent out into an early lead by Helfenbein, and after being challenged with two furlongs to go, he drifted to the left and pulled clear in the final 100 yards to win by three lengths from Rapido. On 6 July, Sea The Moon started as the favourite for the Deutsches Derby, where he was ridden by Christophe Soumillon. After being drawn wide he soon took the lead. As the field turned into the finishing straight, he crossed the track to race on the opposite side to the rest of the field. In the closing stages of the race, Sea The Moon pulled well clear of the other runners to win by eleven lengths from Lucky Lion, who was a further two and a half lengths ahead of third placed Open Your Heart.

In September, Sea The Moon started the 1/2 favourite for the Grosser Preis von Baden in which he was matched for the first time against older horses. By this time he had been elevated to ante-post favourite for the Prix de l'Arc de Triomphe. He led for most of the race but was overtaken in the closing stages and beaten three lengths into second place by the four-year-old Ivanhowe. A few days after the race it was announced that the colt had suffered a recurrence of earlier injury problems and would not race again in 2014. On 16 September it was revealed that the colt, who was receiving treatment at Newmarket's Equine Hospital, would be retired from racing and begin his stud career in 2015 at Lanwades Stud in Newmarket, England.

== Honours ==
In April 2015, Sea The Moon was voted German Horse of the Year, taking 42% of the vote ahead of Protectionist (39%) and Ivanhowe (19%).

== Stud career ==
=== Notable progeny ===
'c = colt, f = filly, g = gelding

Foaled	Name	Sex	Major wins
2016	Durston	g	Caulfield Cup
2017	Alpine Star	f	Coronation Stakes
2019	Assistent	c	Grosser Preis von Bayern
2020	Fantastic Moon	c	Deutsches Derby, Grosser Preis von Baden
2020	Muskoka	f	Preis der Diana
2023	Rayif	c	Poule d'Essai des Poulains, Prix Jacques Le Marois

== Pedigree ==
Pedigree of Sea The Moon, bay colt, 2011
Sire Sea The Stars (IRE) b. 2006	Cape Cross (IRE) b. 1994	Green Desert b. 1983	Danzig
Sire Sea The Stars (IRE) b. 2006	Cape Cross (IRE) b. 1994	Green Desert b. 1983	Foreign Courier
Sire Sea The Stars (IRE) b. 2006	Cape Cross (IRE) b. 1994	Park Appeal b. 1982	Ahonoora
Sire Sea The Stars (IRE) b. 2006	Cape Cross (IRE) b. 1994	Park Appeal b. 1982	Balidaress
Sire Sea The Stars (IRE) b. 2006	Urban Sea (USA) ch. 1989	Miswaki ch. 1978	Mr. Prospector
Sire Sea The Stars (IRE) b. 2006	Urban Sea (USA) ch. 1989	Miswaki ch. 1978	Hopespringseternal
Sire Sea The Stars (IRE) b. 2006	Urban Sea (USA) ch. 1989	Allegretta ch. 1978	Lombard
Sire Sea The Stars (IRE) b. 2006	Urban Sea (USA) ch. 1989	Allegretta ch. 1978	Anatevka
Dam Sanwa (GER) ch. 2004	Monsun (GER) br. 1990	Königsstuhl b. 1976	Dschingis Khan
Dam Sanwa (GER) ch. 2004	Monsun (GER) br. 1990	Königsstuhl b. 1976	Konigskronung
Dam Sanwa (GER) ch. 2004	Monsun (GER) br. 1990	Mosella b. 1985	Surumu
Dam Sanwa (GER) ch. 2004	Monsun (GER) br. 1990	Mosella b. 1985	Monasia
Dam Sanwa (GER) ch. 2004	Sacarina (GB) ch. 1992	Old Vic b. 1986	Sadler's Wells
Dam Sanwa (GER) ch. 2004	Sacarina (GB) ch. 1992	Old Vic b. 1986	Cockade
Dam Sanwa (GER) ch. 2004	Sacarina (GB) ch. 1992	Brave Lass ch. 1974	Ridan
Dam Sanwa (GER) ch. 2004	Sacarina (GB) ch. 1992	Brave Lass ch. 1974	Bravour II
