= Danedream =

German-bred Thoroughbred racehorse

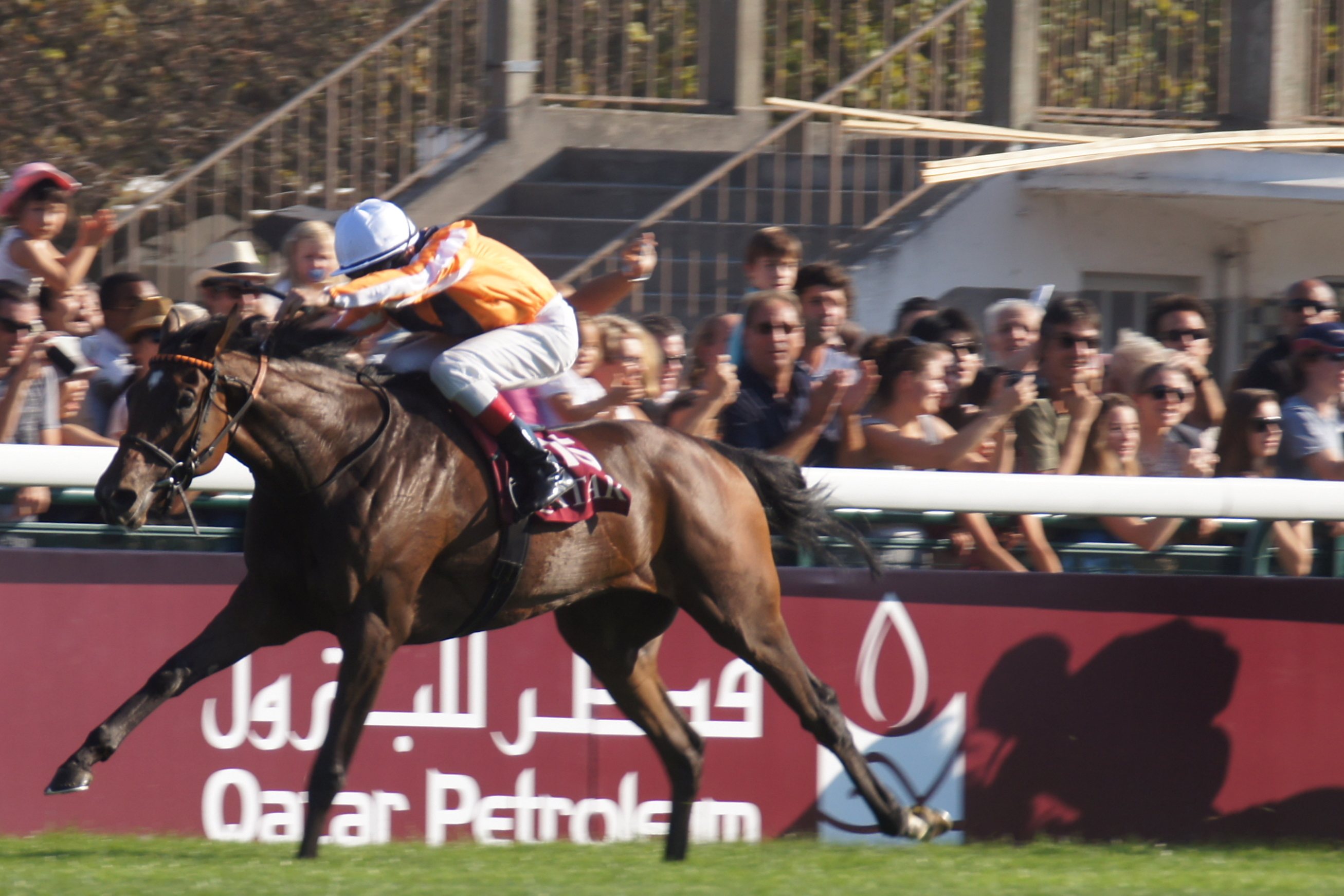
- Danedream with Andrasch Starke winning the 2011 Prix de l'Arc de Triomphe
- Sire: Lomitas
- Grandsire: Niniski
- Dam: Danedrop
- Damsire: Danehill
- Sex: Mare
- Foaled: 7 May 2008
- Died: 31 August 2023 (aged 15)
- Country: Germany
- Colour: Bay
- Breeder: Gestüt Brümmerhof
- Owner: Gestüt Burg Eberstein & Teruya Yoshida
- Trainer: Peter Schiergen
- Record: 16: 7-0-4
- Earnings: EUR 2.870.310 (2. Oct 2011) £3,094,725 (22 July 2012)

Major wins
- Oaks d'Italia (2011); Grosser Preis von Berlin (2011); Grosser Preis von Baden (2011, 2012); Prix de l'Arc de Triomphe (2011); Grosser Preis der Badischen Unternehmen (2012); King George VI and Queen Elizabeth Stakes (2012)

Awards
- European Champion Three-year-old Filly (2011); German Horse of the Year (2011, 2012)

Danedream (foaled 7 May 2008- August 31, 2023) was a German Thoroughbred racehorse best known for winning the 2011 Prix de l'Arc de Triomphe in race record time. She is one of only three German trained horses to win the Arc, the others being Star Appeal in 1975 and Torquator Tasso in 2021. In November 2011 she became the first German-trained horse to win a Cartier Racing Award.

Danedream won only one of her first seven races before gaining her first important win in the Oaks d'Italia. In the second half of 2011, she showed dramatic improvement, winning the Grosser Preis von Berlin by five lengths and the Grosser Preis von Baden by six before easily beating an international field by five lengths in the Arc. In 2012, Danedream ran poorly in the Grand Prix de Saint-Cloud but then became the first German-trained horse to win the King George VI and Queen Elizabeth Stakes, beating an international field at Ascot.

== Background ==
Danedream was sired by the German Horse of the Year Lomitas out of the unraced Danehill mare Danedrop. Lomitas sired the winners of more than two hundred races, the most notable, before the arrival of Danedream, being the Arlington Million winner Silvano. Danedrop was a granddaughter of Lady Berry who won the Prix Royal-Oak and produced several good winners including Vert Amande (Prix Ganay) and Indian Rose (Prix Vermeille).

Danedream was consigned by her breeders, Gestut Brummerhof as a two-year-old in June 2010 to Baden-Baden Spring Horses in Training Sale. She was sold for €9,000 with the buyer recorded as BBA Germany.

== Racing career ==
=== 2010: two-year-old season ===
Danedream made her first appearance in June 2010, when she won a minor race at Wissembourg by two and a half lengths. She was moved up to Listed class a month later to finish third in the Oppenheim-Rennen at Köln. Sent to France for a race at Deauville she finished first, but was disqualified and placed third. In October she returned to France for the Group One Critérium des Pouliches at Longchamp. She started a 33/1 outsider and finished sixth of the eight runners behind Misty For Me. Later in the same month she finished third in the Preis der Winterkonigin on her final start of the year.

=== 2011: three-year-old season ===
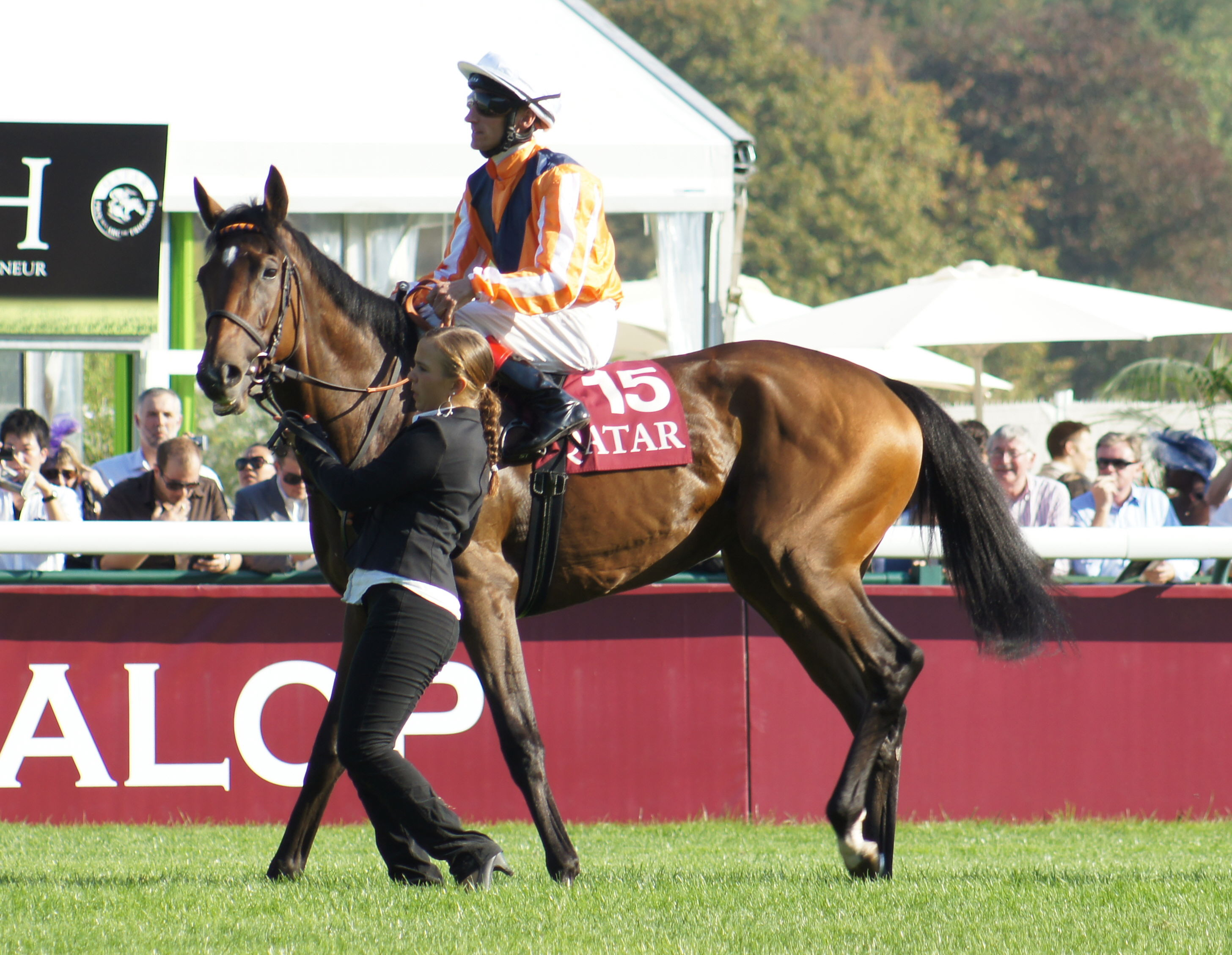
Danedream prior to winning the Prix de l'Arc de Triomphe

On her three-year-old debut, Danedream was sent to Milan for the Listed Premio Seregno over 1600m. She looked outpaced in the straight before staying on to finish fourth. On her next start, Danedream was moved up in distance to 2300m and gave the first indication of her true ability when running third against colts in the Derby Italiano in Rome.

Three weeks later in Milan she recorded her first important victory in the Group Two Oaks d'Italia, taking the lead 400m from the finish and pulling away from her opponents to win by six and a half lengths. Disappointment followed at Saint-Cloud a month later, when she finished only fifth to Testosterone in a blanket finish to the Prix de Malleret.

Danedream returned to Germany for her next start and produced by far her best performance to date in the Grosser Preis von Berlin. After being held up early in the race she was sent into the lead by Andrasch Starke 300m out and drew clear to win by five lengths from the 2010 German Horse of the Year Scalo, with the 2009 German Horse of the Year Night Magic in fourth. In September she confirmed her status as Germany's best racehorse by beating Night Magic by seven lengths in the Grosser Preis von Baden. The Canadian International Stakes winner Joshua Tree was a further six lengths back in third and the Deutsches Derby winner Waldpark finished last of the six runners.

Despite two emphatic wins at Group One level she was not regarded as a major contender for the Prix de l'Arc de Triomphe and started 20/1 outsider in the sixteen runner field. Starke settled the filly in the middle of the field before making his challenge in the straight. Danedream moved strongly through to take the lead from St Nicholas Abbey and Shareta 200m from the finish and was never in any danger of defeat, pulling away to win easily by five lengths from Shareta, with Snow Fairy third and New Zealand-bred champion So You Think fourth. Her winning time of 2:24.49 broke the course record set in 1997 by Peintre Celebre.

On 27 November Danedream started 2.3/1 favourite for the Japan Cup at Tokyo Racecourse, despite being drawn wide in stall 13. She was held up towards the rear of the field as the American entry Mission Approved set a steady pace. At the turn into the straight, Starke switched his filly to the wide outside and Danedream began to make progress. She was never able to reach the leaders however, and finished sixth of the sixteen runners behind the five-year-old mare Buena Vista, beaten three and a half lengths. Schiergen felt that the filly had taken too much out of herself in the early stages as a result of her wide draw position.

In March 2012, Danedream was elected German Horse of the Year, receiving 90% of the public vote.

=== 2012: four-year-old season ===
Danedream made her first appearance of the season in the Grosser Preis der Badischen Unternehmen at Baden-Baden on 20 May. Starting at odds of 2/5, she tracked the leaders before moving to the front 200m from the finish and winning by three quarters of a length from Ovambo Queen. On 24 June, Danedream started odd-on favourite for the Grand Prix de Saint-Cloud but after briefly taking the lead, she was overtaken in the straight and finished last of the four runners behind Meandre.

On July 21, Danedream was sent to contest Britain's most prestigious all-aged race, the King George VI and Queen Elizabeth Stakes at Ascot. The field of ten included the Group One winners St Nicholas Abbey, Dunaden, Masked Marvel, Nathaniel, Deep Brillante and Reliable Man. Starke tracked the leaders before making his challenge in the straight. In an extremely close finish, Danedream caught Nathaniel in the last stride to win by a nose. She became the first German horse to win the race and the first filly to win both the Arc and the King George.

Danedream returned to Germany for her second Grosser Preis von Baden in September, in which her main rivals appeared to be the three-year-old colts Pastorius and Novellist who had finished first and second in the Deutsches Derby. Reportedly unsuited by the slow early pace, Danedream took the lead in the straight and held the persistent challenge of Ovambo Queen to win by half a length, with Pastorius the same distance away in third. A week before Danedream was scheduled to run in her second Arc a horse at the Cologne training centre tested positive for equine infectious anaemia. Although Danedream was not affected by the disease, she was banned from traveling as all 300 horses at the centre were placed in quarantine by the German agriculture department.

== Breeding ==
In December it was announced that Danedream had been retired from racing, and would be bred to Frankel before being exported to Japan. On 1 April 2013, Danedream was voted German Horse of the Year for the second time, with 79% of the vote. Her first filly foal was born on 27 January 2014.

Danedream was humanely put down in Japan on August 31, 2023 due to laminitis.

== Pedigree ==
Pedigree of Danedream (GER), bay filly, 2008
Sire Lomitas (GB) 1988	Niniski (USA); 1976	Nijinsky	Northern Dancer
Sire Lomitas (GB) 1988	Niniski (USA); 1976	Nijinsky	Flaming Page
Sire Lomitas (GB) 1988	Niniski (USA); 1976	Virginia Hills	Tom Rolfe
Sire Lomitas (GB) 1988	Niniski (USA); 1976	Virginia Hills	Ridin' Easy
Sire Lomitas (GB) 1988	La Colorada (GER); 1981	Surumu	Literat
Sire Lomitas (GB) 1988	La Colorada (GER); 1981	Surumu	Surama
Sire Lomitas (GB) 1988	La Colorada (GER); 1981	La Dorada	Kronzeuge
Sire Lomitas (GB) 1988	La Colorada (GER); 1981	La Dorada	Love In
Dam Danedrop (IRE) 1999	Danehill (USA); 1986	Danzig	Northern Dancer
Dam Danedrop (IRE) 1999	Danehill (USA); 1986	Danzig	Pas de Nom
Dam Danedrop (IRE) 1999	Danehill (USA); 1986	Razyana	His Majesty
Dam Danedrop (IRE) 1999	Danehill (USA); 1986	Razyana	Spring Adieu
Dam Danedrop (IRE) 1999	Rose Bonbon (FR); 1984	High Top	Derring-Do
Dam Danedrop (IRE) 1999	Rose Bonbon (FR); 1984	High Top	Camenae
Dam Danedrop (IRE) 1999	Rose Bonbon (FR); 1984	Lady Berry	Violon d'Ingres
Dam Danedrop (IRE) 1999	Rose Bonbon (FR); 1984	Lady Berry	Moss Rose (Family: 14)

- Danedream is inbred 4 x 4 to Northern Dancer, meaning that this stallion appears twice in the fourth generation of her pedigree.
