= Rayif =

French-bred thoroughbred racehorse

- Racing Silks of Aga Khan
- Breed: Thoroughbred
- Sire: Sea The Moon
- Grandsire: Sea The Stars
- Dam: Rayisa
- Damsire: Holy Roman Emperor
- Sex: Colt
- Foaled: 12 January 2023 (age 3)
- Country: Ireland
- Colour: Chestnut
- Owner: Aga Khan Studs SCEA
- Trainer: Francis-Henri Graffard
- Record: 7: 4-0-2
- Earnings: £1,035,060

Major wins
- Poule d'Essai des Poulains (2026); Prix Jacques le Marois (2026)
- Last updated on 16 August 2026

Rayif (foaled 12 January 2023) is an active French-bred thoroughbred racehorse who won the 2026 French 2000 Guineas race Poule d'Essai des Poulains and 2026 Prix Jacques Le Marois.

== Background ==
Rayif was bred by the Aga Khan stud in Ireland and was foaled on 12 January 2023. Rayif was sired by Sea The Moon winner of the 2014 Deutsches Derby and grandsire Sea the Stars, a champion racehorse who won 2009 Prix de l'Arc de Triomphe. His dam Rayisa a Listed winner and damsire was Holy Roman Emperor.

Rayif is trained by Francis-Henri Graffard for owner Aga Khan Studs, a Thoroughbred horse racing and breeding enterprise that has been owned by the Aga Khan family.

== Racing career ==
=== 2025 : two-year-old season ===
Rayif was debuted at Deauville racecourse on 5 July. Ride by Mickael Barzalona, he won the race by a neck against No Remorse.

His next race was The Aga Khan Studs Prix Francois Boutin, a Gr.3 race on 17 August, at Deauville racecourse. After the gate opened, he was positioned at the back, tracking behind Laureate Crown. At 500m, he started his move outside and passed Laureate Crown at the 400m mark and kept his stride until he took the lead with less than 250m. He then won the race 2 1/2 lengths in front of Andab. That was Rayif's first Group stakes win.

On 5 October, Rayif then entered the Prix Jean-Luc Lagardère a Gr.1 race in Longchamp and an undercard race for Prix de l'Arc de Triomphe. Ride by Barzalona, he was the favorite to win the race. After the gate opened, he was positioned near the back behind another Aga Khan horse Vardif and Godolphin horse Time To Turn. After the final turn, he made a move to the middle between Vardif and Imperial Me Cen and started his stride. He however can't catch the leader Puerto Rico and second place Nighttime, finishing in third by 3 1/4 lengths behind winner.

=== 2026 : three-year-old season ===
Rayif start his classic season entered the French 2000 Guineas Poule d'Essai des Poulains on 10 May, with Puerto Rico and Nighttime entered the race too. After starting from the inside gate, he was positioned third behind leader Hankelow. After the final turn, he got an opening on the inside rail and started striding. He then started fighting the leader Hankelow at the 250m mark, passing Hankelow at 200m. He held his lead until the end and finished the race 1 length in front Komorebi.

== Racing statistics ==
The following racing form is based on information available on sportinglife.com, racingpost.com., France Galop. and British Horseracing Authority.

Date	Distance (Condition)	Race	Class	Course	Field	Finish	Time (Note: Official time of winning horse. The time written in grey doesn't belong to Rayif.)	Winning (Losing) Margin	Jockey	Winner (2nd place)	Ref
2025 – two-year-old season
5 Jul	Turf 1200 m (Good to Soft)	De Tancarville Stakes		Deauville	8	1st	1:10.25	neck	Mickael Barzalona	(No Remorse)	
17 Aug	Turf 1400 m (Good to Soft)	Prix Francois Boutin	GIII	Deauville	7	1st	1:21.59	2 1/2 length	Mickael Barzalona	(Andab)	
5 Oct	Turf 1400 m (Very Soft)	Prix Jean-Luc Lagardère	GI	Longchamp	9	3rd	1:22.12	(3 1/4 lengths)	Mickael Barzalona	Puerto Rico	
2026 – three-year-old season
10 May	Turf 1600 m (Soft)	Poule d'Essai des Poulains	GI	Longchamp	13	1st	1:38.63	1 lengths	Mickael Barzalona	(Komorebi)	
12 Jul	Turf 1400 m (Good)	Prix Jean Prat	GI	Deauville	8	5th	1:22.52	(2 1/4 lengths)	Mickael Barzalona	Thesecretadversary	
16 Aug	Turf 1600 m (Good)	Prix Jacques Le Marois	GI	Deauville	10	1st	1:35.50	neck	Mickael Barzalona	(Zeus Olympios)	
17 Oct	Turf 1 mile (Good)	Queen Elizabeth II Stakes	GI	Ascot	11	3rd	1:40.09	(1 1/2 lengths)	Christophe Soumillon	Talk Of New York	

== Pedigree ==
Pedigree of Rayif (FR), chestnut colt 2023
Sire Sea The Moon (GER) 2011	Sea the Stars (IRE); 2006	Cape Cross (IRE)	Green Desert
Sire Sea The Moon (GER) 2011	Sea the Stars (IRE); 2006	Cape Cross (IRE)	Park Appeal
Sire Sea The Moon (GER) 2011	Sea the Stars (IRE); 2006	Urban Sea (USA)	Miswaki
Sire Sea The Moon (GER) 2011	Sea the Stars (IRE); 2006	Urban Sea (USA)	Allegretta
Sire Sea The Moon (GER) 2011	Sanwa (GER); 2004	Monsun (GER)	Königsstuhl
Sire Sea The Moon (GER) 2011	Sanwa (GER); 2004	Monsun (GER)	Mosella
Sire Sea The Moon (GER) 2011	Sanwa (GER); 2004	Sacarina (GB)	Old Vic
Sire Sea The Moon (GER) 2011	Sanwa (GER); 2004	Sacarina (GB)	Brave Lass
Dam Rayisa (IRE) 2013	Holy Roman Emperor (IRE); 2004	Danehill (USA)	Danzig
Dam Rayisa (IRE) 2013	Holy Roman Emperor (IRE); 2004	Danehill (USA)	Razyana
Dam Rayisa (IRE) 2013	Holy Roman Emperor (IRE); 2004	L'On Vite (USA)	Secretariat
Dam Rayisa (IRE) 2013	Holy Roman Emperor (IRE); 2004	L'On Vite (USA)	Fanfreluche
Dam Rayisa (IRE) 2013	Rayka (IRE); 2007	Selkirk (USA)	Sharpen Up
Dam Rayisa (IRE) 2013	Rayka (IRE); 2007	Selkirk (USA)	Annie Edge
Dam Rayisa (IRE) 2013	Rayka (IRE); 2007	Rayyana (IRE)	Rainbow Quest
Dam Rayisa (IRE) 2013	Rayka (IRE); 2007	Rayyana (IRE)	Rayseka
