= German Horse of the Year =

Award for racehorses in Germany

German Horse of the Year is an award for racehorses instituted in 1957. It is the oldest public vote in the German sports. It was instituted by the WDR journalist Addi Furler. The award is decided by public vote.

== Records ==
Most wins:

- 3 - Orofino (1981, 1982, 1983)
- 3 - Acatenango (1985, 1986, 1987)
- 3 - Torquator Tasso (2020, 2021, 2022)

== Winners since 1990 ==
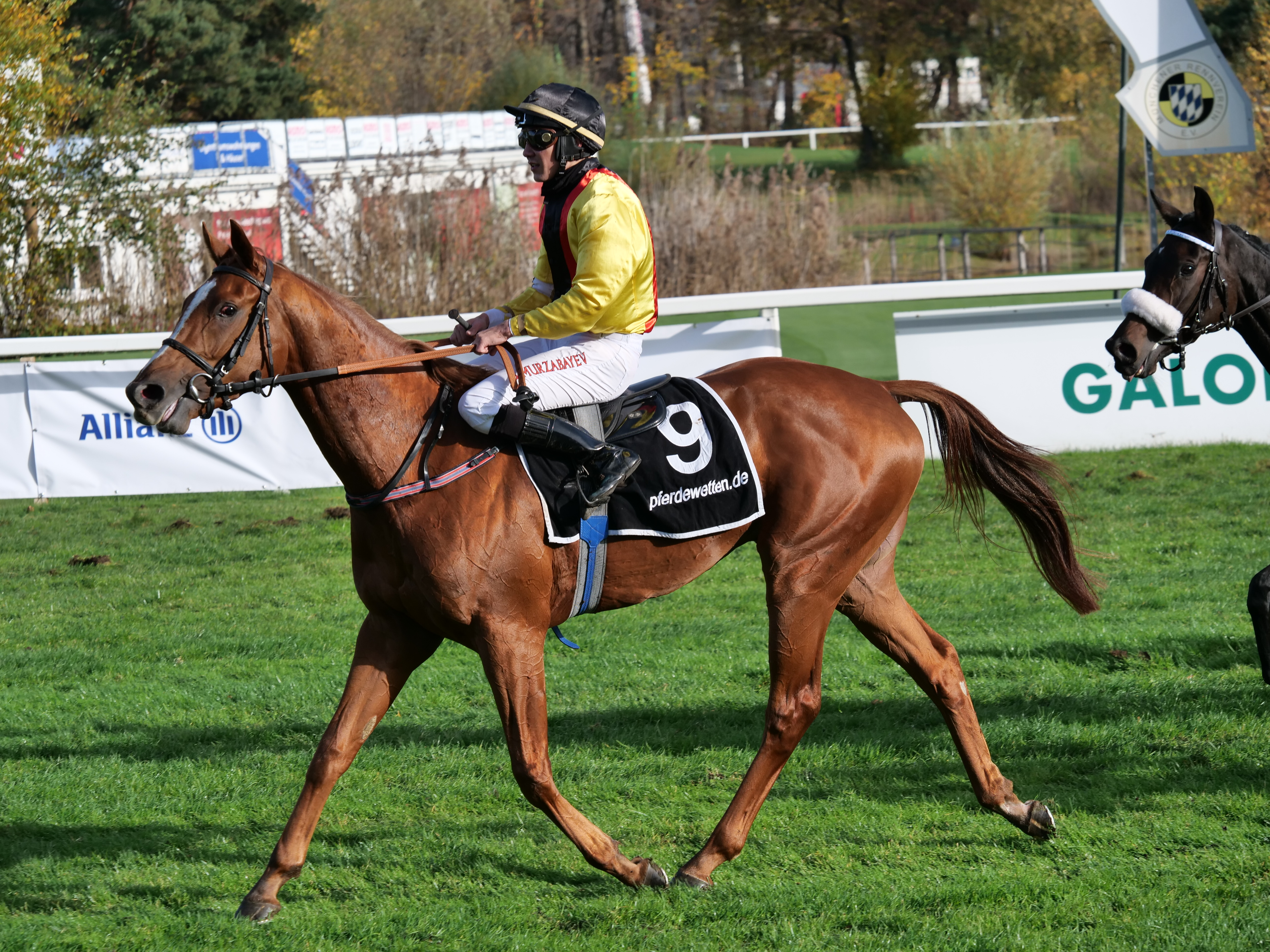
3x German Horse of the Year Torquator Tasso

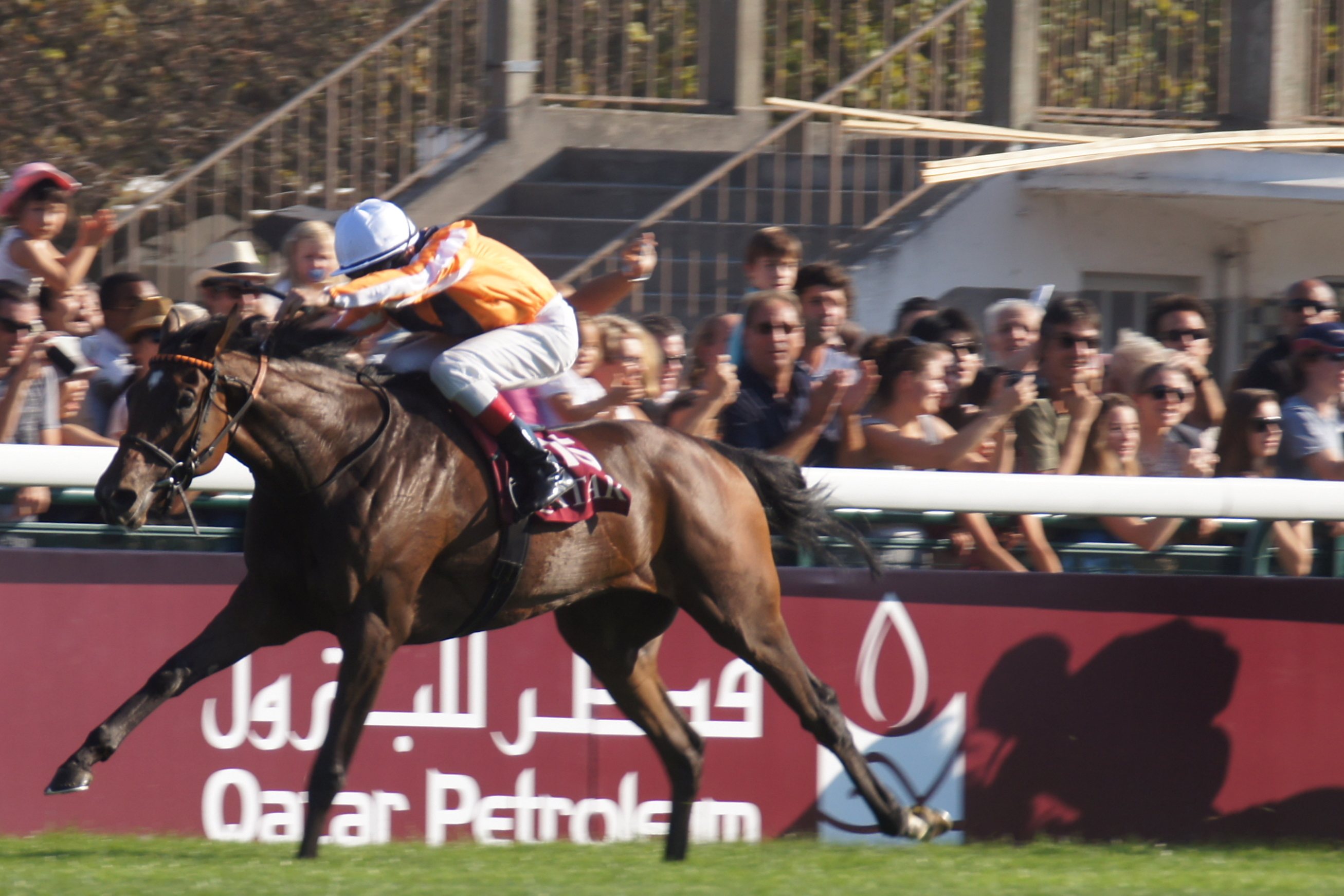
Danedream with Andrasch Starke winning the 2011 Prix de l'Arc de Triomphe

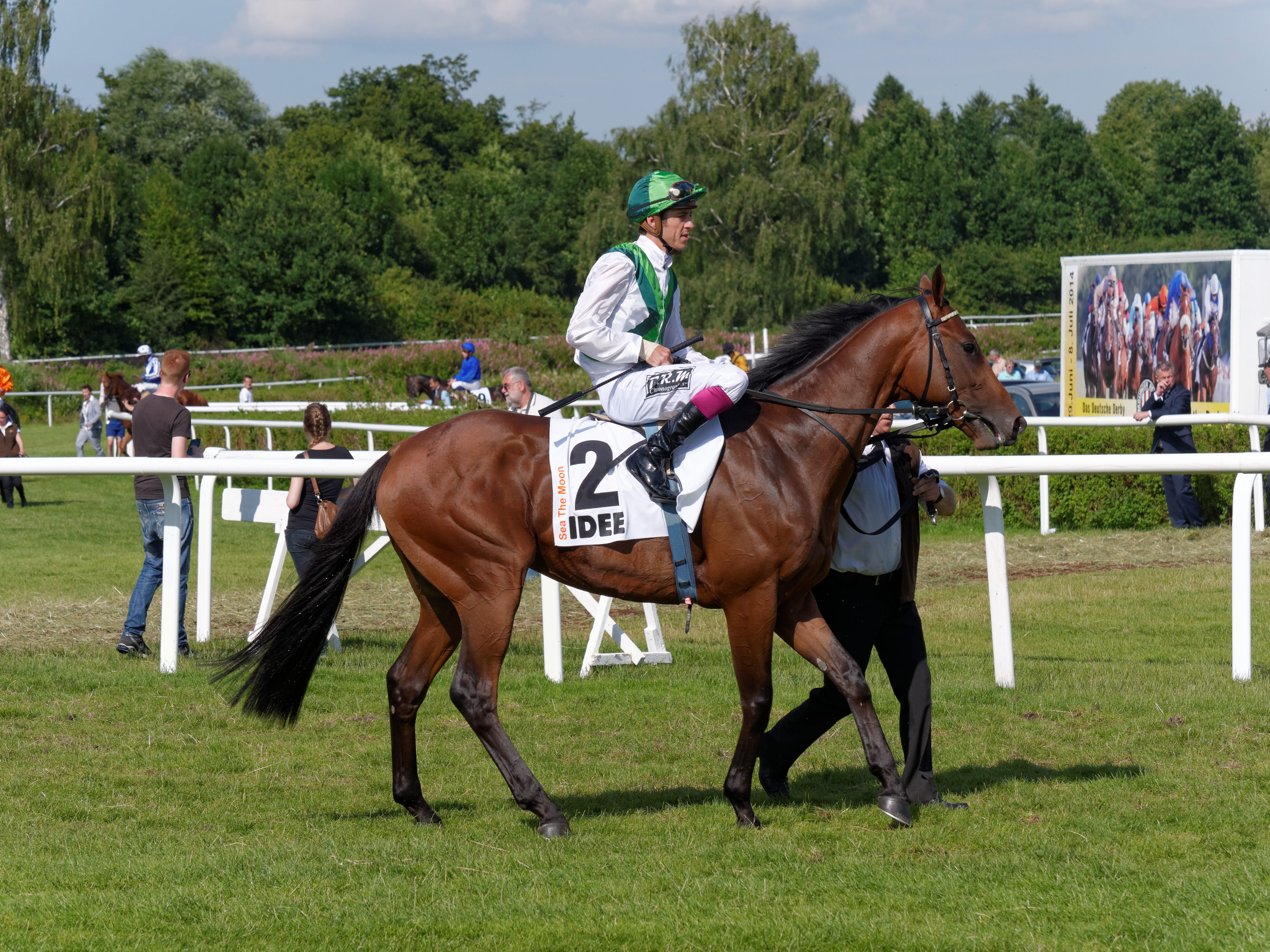
Galopper des Jahres 2014: Sea The Moon with Jockey Christoph Soumillon at Deutsches Derby

| Year | Horse | Age | Gender |
|---|---|---|---|
| 2025 | Hochkönig | 3 | C |
| 2024 | Assistent | 5 | C |
| 2023 | Fantastic Moon | 3 | C |
| 2022 | Torquator Tasso | 5 | C |
| 2021 | Torquator Tasso | 4 | C |
| 2020 | Torquator Tasso | 3 | C |
| 2019 | Rubaiyat | 3 | C |
| 2018 | Iquitos | 6 | H |
| 2017 | Dschingis Secret | 4 | C |
| 2016 | Iquitos | 4 | C |
| 2015 | Nightflower | 4 | F |
| 2014 | Sea The Moon | 3 | C |
| 2013 | Novellist | 4 | C |
| 2012 | Danedream | 4 | F |
| 2011 | Danedream | 3 | F |
| 2010 | Scalo | 3 | C |
| 2009 | Night Magic | 3 | F |
| 2008 | It's Gino | 5 | C |
| 2007 | Quijano | 5 | G |
| 2006 | Prince Flori | 3 | C |
| 2005 | Shirocco | 4 | C |
| 2004 | Soldier Hollow | 4 | C |
| 2003 | Ransom O'War | 3 | C |
| 2002 | Paolini | 5 | C |
| 2001 | Silvano | 3 | C |
| 2000 | Samun | 3 | C |
| 1999 | Tiger Hill | 4 | C |
| 1998 | Tiger Hill | 3 | C |
| 1997 | Borgia | 3 | F |
| 1996 | Lavirco | 3 | C |
| 1995 | Lando | 5 | C |
| 1994 | Lando | 4 | C |
| 1993 | Monsun | 3 | C |
| 1992 | Platini | 3 | C |
| 1991 | Lomitas | 3 | C |
| 1990 | Mondrian | 4 | C |

== Winners before 1990 ==
| Year | Winner | Age | Gender | Sire | Mare |
|---|---|---|---|---|---|
| 1957 | Thila | 3 | Filly | Magnat | Thilde |
| 1958 | Orsini | 4 | Colt | Ticino | Oranien |
| 1959 | Obermaat | 5 | Colt | Goody | Offenbarung |
| 1960 | Waidmann | 4 | Colt | Neckar | Waldrun |
| 1961 | Baalim | 3 | Colt | Mangon | Blaue Adria |
| 1962 | Windbruch | 5 | Colt | Mangon | Windstille |
| 1963 | Mercurius | 3 | Colt | Atatürk | Moretta |
| 1964 | Mercurius | 4 | Colt | Atatürk | Moretta |
| 1965 | Kronzeuge | 4 | Colt | Neckar | Kaiserkrone |
| 1966 | Ilix | 3 | Colt | Orsini | Ivresse |
| 1967 | Luciano | 3 | Colt | Henry the Seventh | Light Arctic |
| 1968 | Luciano | 4 | Colt | Henry the Seventh | Light Arctic |
| 1969 | Hitchcock | 3 | Colt | Waidmannsheil | Humorada |
| 1970 | Alpenkönig | 3 | Colt | Tamerlane | Alpenlerche |
| 1971 | Lombard | 4 | Colt | Agio | Promised Lady |
| 1972 | Lombard | 5 | Colt | Agio | Promised Lady |
| 1973 | Athenagoras | 3 | Colt | Nasram | Avenida |
| 1974 | Marduk | 3 | Colt | Orsini | Marlia |
| 1975 | Star Appeal | 5 | Colt | Appiani | Sterna |
| 1976 | Windwurf | 4 | Colt | Kaiseradler | Wiesenweihe |
| 1977 | Windwurf | 5 | Colt | Kaiseradler | Wiesenweihe |
| 1978 | Esclavo | 2 | Colt | Viceregal | Esclave |
| 1979 | Königsstuhl | 3 | Colt | Dschingis Khan | Königskrönung |
| 1980 | Nebos | 4 | Colt | Caro | Nostrana |
| 1981 | Orofino | 3 | Colt | Dschingis Khan | Ordinale |
| 1982 | Orofino | 4 | Colt | Dschingis Khan | Ordinale |
| 1983 | Orofino | 5 | Colt | Dschingis Khan | Ordinale |
| 1984 | Las Vegas | 3 | Filly | Luciano | Loisach |
| 1985 | Acatenango | 3 | Colt | Surumu | Aggravate |
| 1986 | Acatenango | 4 | Colt | Surumu | Aggravate |
| 1987 | Acatenango | 5 | Colt | Surumu | Aggravate |
| 1988 | Kondor | 4 | Colt | Cagliostro | Kingsi |
| 1989 | Mondrian | 3 | Colt | Surumu | Mole |
