= Nebos =

German-bred Thoroughbred racehorse

- Sire: Caro
- Grandsire: Fortino
- Dam: Nostrana
- Damsire: Botticelli
- Sex: Stallion
- Foaled: 30 March 1976
- Country: Germany
- Colour: Brown
- Breeder: Margit Batthyány
- Owner: Margit Batthyány
- Trainer: Hein Bollow
- Record: 18: 12-4-1

Major wins
- Zukunfts Rennen (1978); Dr. Busch-Memorial (1979); Union-Rennen (1979); Grosser Preis von Berlin (1979, 1980); Preis von Europa (1979); Gerling-Preis (1980); Grosser Preis von Dortmund (1980); Grosser Preis von Baden (1980); Grosser Preis von Düsseldorf (1980)

Awards
- Timeform rating 129 (1980)

Honours
- German Horse of the Year (1980); Leading Sire in Germany (1987)

Nebos (30 March 1976 – 26 June 1999) was a German Thoroughbred racehorse and sire. He was one of the best horses of his generation in Germany at the age of two winning three races including the Zukunfts Rennen. In the following year he won the Dr. Busch-Memorial, Union-Rennen, Grosser Preis von Berlin and Preis von Europa as well as finishing second to Königsstuhl in both the Deutsches Derby and the Aral-Pokal. Nebos emerged as the best racehorse in Germany in 1980, winning five races including the Gerling-Preis, Grosser Preis von Dortmund, Grosser Preis von Baden, Grosser Preis von Düsseldorf and the Grosser Preis von Berlin for the second time as well as being beaten less than two lengths in the Prix de l'Arc de Triomphe. He later became a successful breeding stallion.

== Background ==
Nebos was a dark bay or brown horse with no white markings bred in Germany by his owner Countess Margit Batthyány. He was sired by Caro, an Irish-bred, French-trained stallion whose wins included the Prix d'Ispahan, Poule d'Essai des Poulains and Prix Ganay. He later became a successful breeding stallion in both Europe and North America, siring many good winners including Madelia, Cozzene, Winning Colors, Turgeon, With Approval and Golden Pheasant. Nebos' dam Nostrana won two races and came from a branch of Thoroughbred family 4r which also produced many successful German racehorses as well as the 2000 Guineas winner Island Sands. The colt was trained throughout his racing career by Hein Bollow and ridden in most of his races by Lutz Mäder.

== Racing career ==
=== 1978: two-year-old season ===
As a two-year-old, Nebos won his first three races, all of them over a distance of 1200 metres. His most important success came at Baden-Baden where he won the Group Three Zukunfts-Rennen. On his final appearance of the season he was moved up in distance for the Preis des Winterfavoriten at Cologne and finished second to Esclavo.

=== 1979: three-year-old season ===
On his three-year-old debut, Nebos reversed the form of his only defeat to beat Esclavo in the Dr. Busch-Memorial over 1700 m at Krefeld Racecourse. He was then moved up in distance in June for the Union-Rennen (a trial race for the Deutsches Derby) over 2200 m at Cologne and won from Königsstuhl. Nebos and Königsstuhl met again in the Deutsches Derby a month later, with the latter prevailing by a short head. Later in July, Nebos was matched against older horses and recorded his first Group One win in the Grosser Preis von Berlin over 2400 m at Düsseldorf, winning by four lengths from the British-trained Obraztsovy who had won the Hardwicke Stakes at Royal Ascot. In August, Nebos finished second to Königsstuhl in the Aral-Pokal at Gelsenkirchen. Nebos ended his season in the Group One Preis von Europa over 2400 m at Cologne. He won by three quarters of a length from the Polish horse Czubaryk, with the British colt M-Lolshan (who had beaten Königsstuhl in the Grosser Preis von Baden) a length away in third.

=== 1980: four-year-old season ===
As a four-year-old, Nebos won his first four races, starting with the Gerling-Preis at Cologne. He then won the Grosser Preis von Dortmund by three lengths before defeating Konigsstuhl by two and a half lengths in the Grosser Preis von Düsseldorf. In July he won the Grosser Preis von Berlin for the second time, beating the Italian Derby winner Marracci by three and a half lengths. After five consecutive victories, Nebos' winning run came to an end at Gelsenkirchen when he was beaten a nose by the three-year-old Wauthi in the Aral-Pokal.

On 7 September, Nebos was matched against an international field in the Grosser Preis von Baden over 2400 m at Baden-Baden. He won by a length from Cherubin, with Marracci in third: the unplaced horses included Argument, Nicholas Bill and Cracaval. On 5 October, Nebos raced outside Germany for the first and only time when he was sent to France for the Prix de l'Arc de Triomphe over 2400 m at Longchamp Racecourse. He was well-supported in the betting and started at odds of 7/1 in a field of twenty runners. He appeared to be outpaced in the early stages but made up a great deal of ground in the straight to finish fifth behind Detroit, Argument, Ela-Mana-Mou and Three Troikas, beaten less than two lengths by the winner. Nebos returned to Germany for the Preis von Europa, but failed to reproduce his earlier form, finishing third behind Pawiment.

== Assessment and honours ==
In 1980, the independent Timeform organisation gave Nebos a rating of 129, eight pounds below their top-rated horse Moorestyle. In the official International Classification he was rated the ninth-best horse of any age in Europe. He was also voted German Horse of the Year.

== Stud record ==
At the end of his racing career, Nebos was syndicated with a value of £650,000 and became a breeding stallion at the Gestut Erlenhof, near Frankfurt, beginning his stud career at a fee of 15,000 deutschmarks a mare. He sired several good winners including:

- Antic Boy, foaled 1984, won Leopardstown Stakes
- Gondola, 1984, won Deutsches St. Leger
- Lebos, 1984, won Deutsches Derby
- Zohar, 1989, won Union-Rennen
- Pinot, 1990, won Deutsches St. Leger, Prix de Barbeville
- Laroche, 1991, won Deutsches Derby, Premio Ellington, Gerling Preis
- First Hello, 1992, won Deutsches St. Leger
- Night Devil, 1995, won Grosser Preis von Dahlwitz
- Golden Goal, 1996, won Scilly Isles Novices' Chase, Pendil Novices' Chase

Nebos was the leading Sire in Germany in 1987. He died in 1999 at the age of twenty-three.

== Pedigree ==
Pedigree of Nebos (GER), brown stallion, 1976
Sire Caro (IRE) 1967	Fortino (FR); 1959	Grey Sovereign	Nasrullah
Sire Caro (IRE) 1967	Fortino (FR); 1959	Grey Sovereign	Kong
Sire Caro (IRE) 1967	Fortino (FR); 1959	Ranavalo	Relic
Sire Caro (IRE) 1967	Fortino (FR); 1959	Ranavalo	Navarra
Sire Caro (IRE) 1967	Chambord (GB); 1955	Chamossaire	Precipitation
Sire Caro (IRE) 1967	Chambord (GB); 1955	Chamossaire	Snowberry
Sire Caro (IRE) 1967	Chambord (GB); 1955	Life Hill	Solario
Sire Caro (IRE) 1967	Chambord (GB); 1955	Life Hill	Lady of the Snows
Dam Nostrana (GER) 1960	Botticelli (ITY); 1951	Blue Peter	Fairway
Dam Nostrana (GER) 1960	Botticelli (ITY); 1951	Blue Peter	Fancy Free
Dam Nostrana (GER) 1960	Botticelli (ITY); 1951	Buonamica	Nicoclo dell'Arca
Dam Nostrana (GER) 1960	Botticelli (ITY); 1951	Buonamica	Bernina
Dam Nostrana (GER) 1960	Naxos (GER); 1950	Ticino	Athanasius
Dam Nostrana (GER) 1960	Naxos (GER); 1950	Ticino	Terra
Dam Nostrana (GER) 1960	Naxos (GER); 1950	Nixe	Arjaman
Dam Nostrana (GER) 1960	Naxos (GER); 1950	Nixe	Nanon (Family: 4-r)
