= Lanwades Stud =

Coordinates: 52.2641°N 0.4874°E

- Industry: Horse breeding
- Headquarters: Newmarket, United Kingdom
- Key people: Kirsten Rausing

Lanwades Stud is a Thoroughbred racehorse ownership and breeding operation in Newmarket, Suffolk, UK, which has bred and owned many notable horses.

Currently, Study of Man and Sea The Moon are standing stud at Lanwades Stud.

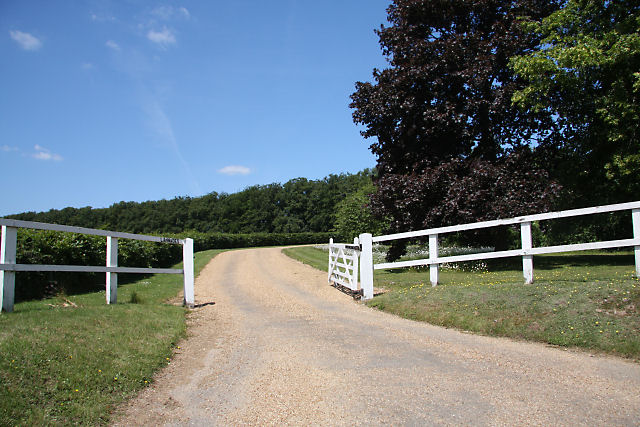
Entrance to Lanwade Viewed from the B1085, this track leads to Lanwade, part of the Lanwades Stud.

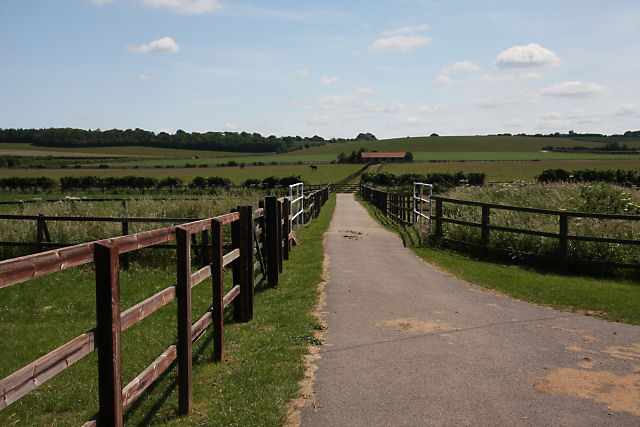
Track to grazing land. This track and fields belong to Lanwades Stud and are used by racehorses for grazing.

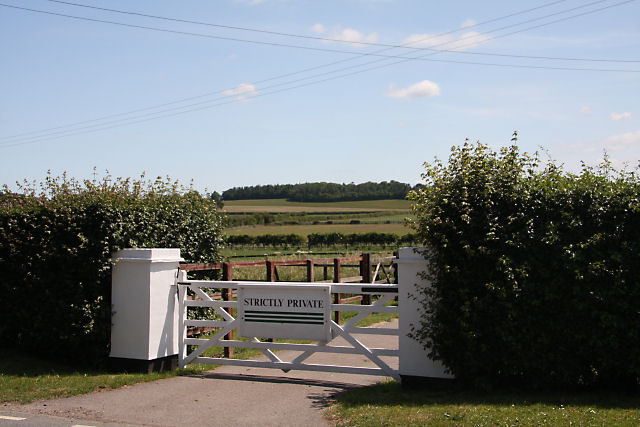
Gateway to grazing fields This gateway is directly opposite the main entrance to Lanwades Stud, off the B1085. Racehorses graze in these private fields.
