= Grosser Preis von Berlin =

Großer Preis von Berlin (Deutschland-Preis)
- Class: Group 1
- Location: Hoppegarten Racecourse; Hoppegarten, Germany
- Inaugurated: 1888
- Race type: Flat / Thoroughbred
- Sponsor: Westminster
- Website: Hoppegarten

Race information
- Distance: 2,400 metres (1½ miles)
- Surface: Turf
- Track: Right-handed
- Qualification: Three-years-old and up
- Weight: 55 kg (3yo); 60 kg (4yo+); Allowances; 2 kg for fillies and mares
- Purse: €155,000 (2022); 1st: €100,000

Grosser Preis von Berlin
2021
Alpinista	Torquator Tasso	Walton Street

Previous years
2020
Torquator Tasso	Dicaprio	Kaspar
2019
French King	Communique	Old Persian
2018
Best Solution	Sound Check	Royal Youmzain
2017
Dschingis Secret	Hawkbill	Racing History
2016
Protectionist	Nightflower	Guignol
2015
Second Step	Ito	Nutan
2014
Sirius	Berlin Berlin	Lucky Speed
2013
Nymphea	Temida	Meandre
2012
Meandre	Earl Of Tinsdal	Baschar
2011
Danedream	Scalo	Superstition

2010-2000
2010
Campanologist	Wiener Walzer	Quijano
2009
Getaway	Flamingo Fantasy	Appel Au Maitre
2008
Adlerflug	Quijano	It's Gino
2007
Schiaparelli	Conillon	First Stream
2006
Donaldson	Schiaparelli	Salutino
2005
Gonbarda	Collier Hill	Simonas
2004
Albanova	Dayano	Rotteck
2003
Sabiango	Storm Trooper	Levirat
2002
Marienbard	Yavana's Pace	Samum
2001
Anzillero	Sabiango	Yavana's Pace
2000
Mutafaweq	Quezon City	Catella

The Großer Preis von Berlin, formerly known as the Deutschland-Preis, is a Group 1 flat horse race in Germany open to thoroughbreds aged three years or older. It is run at Hoppegarten over a distance of 2,400 metres (about 1½ miles), and it is scheduled to take place each year in July or August.

== History ==
The event was established in 1888, and it was originally staged at Hoppegarten as the Grosser Preis von Berlin. It was initially contested over 2,000 metres, and was extended to 2,200 metres in 1897. It was transferred to Grunewald and increased to 2,400 metres in 1909. A new distance of 2,600 metres was introduced in 1927.

The race returned to Hoppegarten in 1934, and it was renamed the Grosser Preis der Reichshauptstadt in 1937. From this point it was run over 2,400 metres, and it reverted to 2,600 metres in 1943.

The event switched to Düsseldorf and was renamed the Grosser Preis von Nordrhein-Westfalen in 1947. That year's running was over 2,400 metres, and it returned to 2,600 metres in 1948. Its current period over 2,400 metres began in 1965.

The present race grading system was introduced in Germany in 1972, and the Grosser Preis von Nordrhein-Westfalen was classed at Group 1 level. Its original title, the Grosser Preis von Berlin, was restored in 1977.

The event became known as the Deutschland-Preis in 1996. It was held at Hamburg and merged with the Hansa-Preis in 2010. It returned to Hoppegarten as the Grosser Preis von Berlin in 2011.

== Records ==
Most successful horse (3 wins):

- Ticino – 1942, 1943, 1944
- Mercurius – 1963, 1964, 1965

Leading jockey (8 wins):

- Otto Schmidt – Ossian (1921), Augias (1923, 1924), Elritzling (1939), Ticino (1942, 1943, 1944), Niederländer (1950)

Leading trainer (10 wins):

- George Arnull – Weissdorn (1925), Mah Jong (1927), Oleander (1928, 1929), Alba (1930), Wolkenflug (1932), Blinzen (1934), Sturmvogel (1935, 1936), Schwarzgold (1940)

(note: the trainers of some of the early winners are unknown)

Leading owner (22 wins):

- Gestüt Schlenderhan – Dorn (1892), Signor (1903), For Ever (1909), Dolomit (1912), Majestic (1913), Wallenstein (1922), Weissdorn (1925), Mah Jong (1927), Oleander (1928, 1929), Alba (1930), Wolkenflug (1932), Blinzen (1934), Sturmvogel (1935, 1936), Schwarzgold (1940), Agio (1958), Alpenkönig (1970), Lombard (1971, 1972), Arratos (1973), Adlerflug (2008)

== Winners since 1970 ==
Year	Winner	Age	Jockey	Trainer	Owner	Time	Country
1970	Alpenkönig	3	Fritz Drechsler	Heinz Jentzsch	Gestüt Schlenderhan	2:37.10	Germany
1971	Lombard	4	Fritz Drechsler	Heinz Jentzsch	Gestüt Schlenderhan	2:32.40	Germany
1972	Lombard	5	Fritz Drechsler	Heinz Jentzsch	Gestüt Schlenderhan	2:35.60	Germany
1973	Arratos	4	Fritz Drechsler	Heinz Jentzsch	Gestüt Schlenderhan	2:30.80	Germany
1974	Tannenberg	4	Jerzy Jednaszewski	Heinz Gummelt	Gestüt Ravensberg	2:40.80	Germany
1975	Athenagoras	5	Harro Remmert	Sven von Mitzlaff	Gestüt Zoppenbroich	2:26.70	Germany
1976	Windwurf	4	Jerzy Jednaszewski	Heinz Gummelt	Gestüt Ravensberg	2:36.00	Germany
1977	Windwurf	5	Geoff Lewis	Heinz Gummelt	Gestüt Ravensberg	2:31.70	Germany
1978	First Lord	3	Willie Carson	Georg Zuber	Stall Weissenhof	2:31.50	Germany
1979	Nebos	3	Lutz Mäder	Hein Bollow	Countess Batthyany	2:36.20	Germany
1980	Nebos	4	Lutz Mäder	Hein Bollow	Countess Batthyany	2:27.60	Germany
1981	Lydian	3	Freddy Head	Criquette Head	Ecurie Åland	2:36.50	France
1982	Orofino	4	Peter Alafi	Sven von Mitzlaff	Gestüt Zoppenbroich	2:34.60	Germany
1983	Abary	3	Andrzej Tylicki	Heinz Jentzsch	Gestüt Fährhof	2:29.40	Germany
1984	Abary	4	Georg Bocskai	Heinz Jentzsch	Gestüt Fährhof	2:28.70	Germany
1985	Ordos	5	Peter Alafi	Sven von Mitzlaff	Gestüt Zoppenbroich	2:27.30	Germany
1986	Acatenango	4	Georg Bocskai	Heinz Jentzsch	Gestüt Fährhof	2:27.70	Germany
1987	Le Glorieux	3	Alain Lequeux	Robert Collet	Sieglinde Wolf	2:29.50	France
1988	Helikon ^{[a]}	5	Lutz Mäder	Bruno Schütz	Stall Reckendorf	2:36.78	Germany
1989	Mondrian	3	Kevin Woodburn	Uwe Stoltefuss	Stall Hanse	2:31.88	Germany
1990	Ibn Bey	6	Richard Quinn	Paul Cole	Fahd Salman	2:27.09	United Kingdom
1991	Lomitas	3	Peter Schiergen	Andreas Wöhler	Gestüt Fährhof	2:28.99	Germany
1992	Platini	3	Mark Rimmer	Bruno Schütz	Stall Steigenberger	2:29.54	Germany
1993	Kornado	3	Mark Rimmer	Bruno Schütz	Stall Granum	2:40.10	Germany
1994	Sternkönig	4	Andreas Helfenbein	Theo Grieper	Gestüt Röttgen	2:25.38	Germany
1995	Lando	5	Peter Schiergen	Heinz Jentzsch	Gestüt Ittlingen	2:26.60	Germany
1996	Hollywood Dream	5	John Reid	Uwe Ostmann	Gestüt Ittlingen	2:26.35	Germany
1997	Luso	5	Frankie Dettori	Clive Brittain	Darley Stud	2:27.60	United Kingdom
1998	Ungaro	4	Terence Hellier	Hans Blume	Gestüt Röttgen	2:30.82	Germany
1999	Ungaro	5	Andrasch Starke	Hans Blume	Gestüt Röttgen	2:26.30	Germany
2000	Mutafaweq	4	Richard Hills	Saeed bin Suroor	Godolphin	2:27.31	United Kingdom
2001	Anzillero	4	Kevin Woodburn	Dave Richardson	Gestüt Erlenhof	2:29.22	Germany
2002	Marienbard	5	Frankie Dettori	Saeed bin Suroor	Godolphin	2:25.67	United Kingdom
2003	Sabiango	5	Eduardo Pedroza	Andreas Wöhler	Gestüt Fährhof	2:31.48	Germany
2004	Albanova	5	Terence Hellier	Sir Mark Prescott	Kirsten Rausing	2:33.29	United Kingdom
2005	Gonbarda	3	Filip Minařík	Uwe Ostmann	Gestüt Auenquelle	2:28.73	Germany
2006	Donaldson	4	Torsten Mundry	Peter Rau	Gestüt Ittlingen	2:33.06	Germany
2007	Schiaparelli	4	Andrasch Starke	Peter Schiergen	Stall Blankenese	2:31.26	Germany
2008	Adlerflug	4	Fredrik Johansson	Jens Hirschberger	Gestüt Schlenderhan	2:37.58	Germany
2009	Getaway	6	Stephen Hellyn	Jens Hirschberger	Georg von Ullmann	2:28.51	Germany
2010	Campanologist	5	Frankie Dettori	Saeed bin Suroor	Godolphin	2:33.04	United Kingdom
2011	Danedream	3	Andrasch Starke	Peter Schiergen	Gestüt Burg Eberstein	2:33.50	Germany
2012	Meandre	4	Maxime Guyon	André Fabre	Rothschild Family	2:31.50	France
2013	Nymphea	4	Dennis Schiergen	Peter Schiergen	Stall Nizza	2:26.30	Germany
2014	Sirius	3	Stephen Hellyn	Andreas Lowe	Stall Molenhof	2:31.50	Germany
2015	Second Step	4	Jamie Spencer	Luca Cumani	Merry Fox Stud	2:28.50	United Kingdom
2016	Protectionist	6	Eduardo Pedroza	Andreas Wöhler	Australian Bloodstock Stable	2:41.10	Germany
2017	Dschingis Secret	4	Adrie de Vries	Markus Klug	Horst Pudwill	2:32.89	Germany
2018	Best Solution	4	Pat Cosgrave	Saeed bin Suroor	Godolphin	2:29.35	United Kingdom
2019	French King	4	Olivier Peslier	Henri-Alex Pantall	Abdulla bin Khalifa Al Thani	2:35.16	France
2020	Torquator Tasso	3	Lukas Delozier	Marcel Weiss	Gestut Auenquelle	2:33.78	Germany
2021	Alpinista	4	Luke Morris	Sir Mark Prescott	Miss K Rausing	2:29.48	United Kingdom
2022	Rebel's Romance	4	James Doyle	Charlie Appleby	Godolphin	2:32.33	United Kingdom
2023	Simca Mille	4	Alexis Pouchin	Stephane Wattel	Haras De La Perelle & S Wattel	2:34.24	France
2024	Al Riffa	4	Dylan Browne McMonagle	Joseph O'Brien	Al Riffa Syndicate	2:30.29	Ireland
2025	Rebel's Romance	7	Billy Loughnane	Charlie Appleby	Godolphin	2:27.81	United Kingdom
2026	Tiffany	6	Luke Morris	Sir Mark Prescott	Elite Racing 004	2:28.62	United Kingdom

^{a} Carroll House finished first in 1988, but he was relegated to third place following a stewards' inquiry.

== Earlier winners ==
- 1888: Durchgänger
- 1889: Freimaurer
- 1890: Dalberg
- 1891: Hawk
- 1892: Dorn
- 1893: Hardenberg
- 1894: Ausmärker
- 1895: Hannibal
- 1896: Rondinelli
- 1897: Tokio
- 1898: Magister / Sperber's Bruder *
- 1899: Namouna
- 1900: Xamete
- 1901: Tuki
- 1902: Slanderer
- 1903: Signor
- 1904: Pathos
- 1905: Slaby
- 1906: Festino
- 1907: Fels
- 1908: Horizont
- 1909: For Ever
- 1910: Fervor
- 1911: Icy Wind
- 1912: Dolomit
- 1913: Majestic
- 1914: Orelio
- 1915: no race
- 1916: Anschluss
- 1917: Landgraf
- 1918: Traum
- 1919: Eckstein
- 1920: Herold
- 1921: Ossian
- 1922: Wallenstein
- 1923: Augias
- 1924: Augias
- 1925: Weissdorn
- 1926: Ferro
- 1927: Mah Jong
- 1928: Oleander
- 1929: Oleander
- 1930: Alba
- 1931: Sichel
- 1932: Wolkenflug
- 1933: Alchimist
- 1934: Blinzen
- 1935: Sturmvogel
- 1936: Sturmvogel
- 1937: Corrida
- 1938: Antonym
- 1939: Elritzling
- 1940: Schwarzgold
- 1941: Niccolo dell'Arca
- 1942: Ticino
- 1943: Ticino
- 1944: Ticino
- 1945–46: no race
- 1947: Glockenton
- 1948: Solo
- 1949: Nebelwerfer
- 1950: Niederländer
- 1951: Grande
- 1952: Mangon
- 1953: Tasmin
- 1954: Mangon
- 1955: Masetto
- 1956: Gombar
- 1957: Mogul
- 1958: Agio
- 1959: Waldcanter
- 1960: Wicht
- 1961: Windbruch
- 1962: Windbruch
- 1963: Mercurius
- 1964: Mercurius
- 1965: Mercurius
- 1966: Kronzeuge
- 1967: Norfolk
- 1968: Luciano
- 1969: Cortez

* The 1898 race was a dead-heat and has joint winners.

== See also ==
- List of German flat horse races
