= Grosser Preis von Baden =

German Flat horse race

- Class: Group 1
- Location: Iffezheim Racecourse; Baden-Baden, Germany
- Inaugurated: 1858; 168 years ago
- Race type: Flat / Thoroughbred
- Sponsor: Longines
- Website: Baden-Baden

Race information
- Distance: 2,400 metres (1½ miles)
- Surface: Turf
- Track: Left-handed
- Qualification: Three years old and up
- Weight: 56 kg (3yo); 60 kg (4yo+); Allowances; 2 kg for fillies and mares
- Purse: €400,000 (2023); 1st: €230,000

Grosser Preis von Baden
2025
Goliath	Dubai Honour	Straight

Previous years
2024
Fantastic Moon	Dubai Honour	Narrativo
2023
Zagrey	Mr Hollywood	Straight
2022
Mendocino	Torquator Tasso	Sammarco
2021
Torquator Tasso	Sisfahan	Passion And Glory

2020-2011
2020
Barney Roy	Communique	Torquator Tasso
2019
Ghaiyyath	Donjah	Laccario
2018
Best Solution	Defoe	Iquitos
2017
Guignol	Iquitos	Colomano
2016
Iquitos	Nightflower	Pagella
2015
Prince Gibraltar	Nightflower	Sirius
2014
Our Ivanhowe	Sea The Moon	Night Wish
2013
Novellist	Seismos	Meandre
2012
Danedream	Ovambo Queen	Pastorius
2011
Danedream	Night Magic	Joshua Tree

2010-2001
2010
Night Magic	Quijano	Cavalryman
2009
Getaway	Eastern Anthem	Youmzain
2008
Kamsin	Adlerflug	It's Gino
2007
Quijano	Adlerflug	Egerton
2006
Prince Flori	Oriental Tiger	Saddex
2005
Warrsan	Gonbarda	Westerner
2004
Warrsan	Egerton	Shirocco
2003
Mamool	Black Sam Bellamy	Dano-Mast
2002
Marienbard	Salve Regina	Noroit
2001
Morshdi	Boreal	Sabiango

2000-1992
2000
Samum	Catella	Fruits Of Love
1999
Tiger Hill	Flamingo Road	Belenus
1998
Tiger Hill	Caitano	Public Purse
1997
Borgia	Luso	Predappio
1996
Pilsudski	Germany	Sunshack
1995
Germany	Lecroix	Right Win
1994
Lando	Monsun	Kornado
1993
Lando	Platini	George Augustus
1992
Mashaallah	Platini	Sapience

The Grosser Preis von Baden is a Group 1 flat horse race in Germany open to thoroughbreds aged three years or older. It is run at Baden-Baden over a distance of 2,400 metres (about 1½ miles), taking place each year in early September. It is considered one of the most important horse races in Germany, for the winner often goes on to participate in the Prix de L´Arc de Triomphe a month later.

== History ==
The event was established in 1858 and contested originally over 3,200 metres. The inaugural running was part of a three-day festival which celebrated the opening of Baden-Baden's Iffezheim racecourse.

The race was shortened to 2,800 metres in 1887. It was titled the Jubiläums-Preis on several occasions during the 1890s. Its distance was cut to 2,200 metres in 1894 and extended to 2,400 metres in 1898.

The Grosser Preis von Baden was staged at Hoppegarten from 1942 to 1944. It was not contested from 1945 to 1947 and was known as the Grosser Preis von Iffezheim in 1948 and 1949.

The present system of race grading was introduced in Germany in 1972, when the race was classed at Group 1 level. It was run in two separate divisions in 1974.

The race has had several different sponsors since the mid-1990s, including Mercedes-Benz, Volkswagen and Longines.

The Grosser Preis von Baden was added to the Breeders' Cup Challenge series in 2012. The winner earned an automatic invitation to compete in the same year's Breeders' Cup Turf. The race was removed from the series after the 2017 running.

== Records ==
Most successful horse (3 wins):

- Kincsem – 1877, 1878, 1879
- Oleander – 1927, 1928, 1929

Leading jockey (5 wins):

- Gerhard Streit – Magnat (1941), Samurai (1943), Mangon (1952), Baal (1954), Masetto (1956)

Leading trainer (7 wins):

- George Arnull – Oleander (1927, 1928, 1929), Alba (1930), Widerhall (1932), Magnat (1941), Samurai (1943)

(note: the trainers of some of the early winners are unknown)

Leading owner (10 wins):

- Gestüt Schlenderhan – Gastgeber (1875), Oleander (1927, 1928, 1929), Alba (1930), Widerhall (1932), Magnat (1941), Samurai (1943), Alpenkönig (1970), Ivanhowe (2014)

== Winners since 1968 ==
Year	Winner	Age	Jockey	Trainer	Owner	Time	Country
1968	Luciano	4	Oskar Langner	Sven von Mitzlaff	Stall Primerose	2:38.10	Germany
1969	Stratford	5	Carlo Ferrari	Federico Regoli	Scuderia Ticino	2:40.00	Italy
1970	Alpenkönig	3	Fritz Drechsler	Heinz Jentzsch	Gestüt Schlenderhan	2:34.00	Germany
1971	Cortez	6	Oskar Langner	Sven von Mitzlaff	Gestüt Zoppenbroich	2:32.20	Germany
1972	Caracol	3	Oskar Langner	Sven von Mitzlaff	Gestüt Fährhof	2:30.50	Germany
1973	Athenagoras	3	Harro Remmert	Sven von Mitzlaff	Gestüt Zoppenbroich	2:32.00	Germany
1974 ^{i *}	Meautry	4	E. Sauvaget	G. Pézeril	F. Baral	2:34.60	France
1974 ^{ii}	Marduk	3	Peter Remmert	Hein Bollow	Countess Batthyany	2:34.80	Germany
1975	Marduk	4	Peter Remmert	Hein Bollow	Countess Batthyany	2:41.00	Germany
1976	Sharper	3	Willie Carson	Andreas Hecker	Arthur van Kaick	2:38.00	Germany
1977	Windwurf	5	Geoff Lewis	Heinz Gummelt	Gestüt Ravensberg	2:32.40	Germany
1978	Valour	3	John Reid	Fulke Johnson Houghton	George Ward	2:38.40	United Kingdom
1979	M-Lolshan	4	Brian Taylor	Ryan Price	Essa Alkhalifa	2:30.90	United Kingdom
1980	Nebos	4	Lutz Mäder	Hein Bollow	Countess Batthyany	2:37.60	Germany
1981	Pelerin	4	Greville Starkey	Harry Wragg	Sir Philip Oppenheimer	2:27.60	United Kingdom
1982	Glint of Gold	4	Pat Eddery	Ian Balding	Paul Mellon	2:29.10	United Kingdom
1983	Diamond Shoal	4	Steve Cauthen	Ian Balding	Paul Mellon	2:28.00	United Kingdom
1984	Strawberry Road	5	Brent Thomson	John Nicholls	Singleton / Stehr	2:29.60	France
1985	Gold and Ivory	4	Steve Cauthen	Ian Balding	Paul Mellon	2:37.80	United Kingdom
1986	Acatenango	4	Georg Bocskai	Heinz Jentzsch	Gestüt Fährhof	2:28.30	Germany
1987	Acatenango	5	Georg Bocskai	Heinz Jentzsch	Gestüt Fährhof	2:34.70	Germany
1988	Carroll House	3	Bruce Raymond	Michael Jarvis	Antonio Balzarini	2:52.70	United Kingdom
1989	Mondrian	3	Kevin Woodburn	Uwe Stoltefuss	Stall Hanse	2:29.68	Germany
1990	Mondrian	4	Manfred Hofer	Uwe Stoltefuss	Stall Hanse	2:34.65	Germany
1991	Lomitas	3	Peter Schiergen	Andreas Wöhler	Gestüt Fährhof	2:28.81	Germany
1992	Mashaallah	4	John Reid	John Gosden	Ahmed Al Maktoum	2:37.83	United Kingdom
1993	Lando	3	Andrzej Tylicki	Heinz Jentzsch	Gestüt Ittlingen	2:28.20	Germany
1994	Lando	4	Peter Schiergen	Heinz Jentzsch	Gestüt Ittlingen	2:27.33	Germany
1995	Germany	4	Frankie Dettori	Bruno Schütz	Jaber Abdullah	2:37.72	Germany
1996	Pilsudski	4	Walter Swinburn	Michael Stoute	Lord Weinstock	2:26.74	United Kingdom
1997	Borgia	3	Kieren Fallon	Bruno Schütz	Gestüt Ammerland	2:28.56	Germany
1998	Tiger Hill	3	Andreas Suborics	Peter Schiergen	Georg von Ullmann	2:40.16	Germany
1999	Tiger Hill	4	Terence Hellier	Peter Schiergen	Georg von Ullmann	2:29.91	Germany
2000	Samum	3	Andrasch Starke	Andreas Schütz	Stall Blankenese	2:38.95	Germany
2001	Morshdi	3	Philip Robinson	Michael Jarvis	Darley Stud	2:31.27	United Kingdom
2002	Marienbard	5	Frankie Dettori	Saeed bin Suroor	Godolphin	2:34.93	United Kingdom
2003	Mamool	4	Frankie Dettori	Saeed bin Suroor	Godolphin	2:32.75	United Kingdom
2004	Warrsan	6	Kerrin McEvoy	Clive Brittain	Saeed Manana	2:32.79	United Kingdom
2005	Warrsan	7	Kerrin McEvoy	Clive Brittain	Saeed Manana	2:34.42	United Kingdom
2006	Prince Flori	3	Filip Minařík	Sascha Smrczek	Stall Reni	2:33.87	Germany
2007	Quijano	5	Andrasch Starke	Peter Schiergen	Gestüt Fährhof	2:28.19	Germany
2008	Kamsin	3	Johan Victoire	Peter Schiergen	Stall Blankenese	2:37.68	Germany
2009	Getaway	6	Adrie de Vries	Jens Hirschberger	Georg von Ullmann	2:36.06	Germany
2010	Night Magic	4	Filip Minařík	Wolfgang Figge	Stall Salzburg	2:32.73	Germany
2011	Danedream	3	Andrasch Starke	Peter Schiergen	Gestüt Burg Eberstein	2:37.52	Germany
2012	Danedream	4	Andrasch Starke	Peter Schiergen	Eberstein & Yoshida	2:36.23	Germany
2013	Novellist	4	Eduardo Pedroza	Andreas Wöhler	Christoph Berglar	2:33.90	Germany
2014	Ivanhowe	4	Filip Minařík	Jean-Pierre Carvalho	Gestüt Schlenderhan	2:36.30	Germany
2015	Prince Gibraltar	4	Fabrice Veron	Jean-Claude Rouget	Jean-Francois Gribomont	2:31.48	France
2016	Iquitos	4	Ian Ferguson	Hans-Juergen Groeschel	Stall Mulligan	2:33.79	Germany
2017	Guignol	5	Filip Minařík	Jean-Pierre Carvalho	Stall Ullmann	2:32.55	Germany
2018	Best Solution	4	Pat Cosgrave	Saeed bin Suroor	Godolphin	2:37.38	United Kingdom
2019	Ghaiyyath	4	William Buick	Charlie Appleby	Godolphin	2:30.08	United Kingdom
2020	Barney Roy	6	James Doyle	Charlie Appleby	Godolphin	2:39.52	United Kingdom
2021	Torquator Tasso	4	Rene Piechulek	Marcel Weiss	Gestut Auenquelle	2:29.21	Germany
2022	Mendocino	4	Rene Piechulek	Sarah Steinberg	Stall Salzburg	2:38.71	Germany
2023	Zagrey	4	Christophe Soumillon	Yann Barberot	Ecurie Altima & Gerard Augustin-Normand	2:39.77	France
2024	Fantastic Moon	4	Rene Piechulek	Sarah Steinberg	Liberty Racing 2021	2:28.03	Germany
2025	Goliath	5	Clement Lecoeuvre	Francis-Henri Graffard	Resolute Bloodstock & Philip Baron Von Ullmann	2:29.02	France
2026	Saddadd	4	Jack Mitchell	Roger Varian	Ahmed Al Maktoum	2:27.66	United Kingdom

* The race was run in two separate divisions in 1974.

== Earlier winners ==
- 1858: La Maladetta
- 1859: Geologie
- 1860: Capucine
- 1861: Mon Etoile
- 1862: Stradella
- 1863: La Toucques
- 1864: Vermouth
- 1865: Vertugadin
- 1866: Etoile Filante
- 1867: Ruy Blas
- 1868: Trocadero ^{1}
- 1869: Cerdagne
- 1870: no race
- 1871: Monseigneur
- 1872: Dami
- 1873: Hochstapler
- 1874: Il Maestro
- 1875: Gastgeber
- 1876: Przedswit
- 1877: Kincsem
- 1878: Kincsem ^{2}
- 1879: Kincsem
- 1880: Tallos
- 1881: La Gondola
- 1882: Lehetetlen
- 1883: Brocken
- 1884: Florence
- 1885: Plaisanterie
- 1886: Nero
- 1887: Bulgar
- 1888: Waverley
- 1889: Tantale
- 1890: Yellow
- 1891: Le Capricorne
- 1892: Perdican
- 1893: Nickel
- 1894: Ilse
- 1895: Armbruster
- 1896: Tokio
- 1897: En Bloc
- 1898: Slusohr
- 1899: Gobseck
- 1900: Xamete
- 1901: Semendria
- 1902: La Camargo
- 1903: Vinicius
- 1904: Exema
- 1905: Gouvernant
- 1906: Hautbois
- 1907: Hammurabi
- 1908: Faust
- 1909: Azalee / Mademoiselle Bon ^{3}
- 1910: Ksiaze Pan
- 1911: Badajoz
- 1912: Rire aux Larmes
- 1913: Mosci Ksiaze
- 1914–20: no race
- 1921: Ossian
- 1922: Träumer
- 1923: Ganelon
- 1924: Scopas
- 1925: Aditi
- 1926: Indigo
- 1927: Oleander
- 1928: Oleander
- 1929: Oleander
- 1930: Alba
- 1931: Sichel
- 1932: Widerhall
- 1933: Alchimist
- 1934: Agalire
- 1935: Athanasius
- 1936: Wahnfried
- 1937: Dadji
- 1938: Procle
- 1939: Trollius
- 1940: no race
- 1941: Magnat
- 1942: Gradivo
- 1943: Samurai
- 1944: Ticino
- 1945–47: no race
- 1948: Der Löwe
- 1949: Silberfasan
- 1950: no race
- 1951: Prince d'Ouilly
- 1952: Mangon
- 1953: Niederländer
- 1954: Baal
- 1955: Stani
- 1956: Masetto
- 1957: Windfang
- 1958: Dushka
- 1959: Malefaim
- 1960: Sheshoon
- 1961: Rio Marin
- 1962: Kaiserstuhl
- 1963: Espresso
- 1964: Espresso
- 1965: Demi Deuil
- 1966: Atilla
- 1967: Salvo

^{1} The 1868 winner was declared as Trocadero after a dead-heat with his stablemate Nelusco.
^{2} The 1878 edition finished as a dead-heat, but Kincsem defeated Prince Giles the First in a run-off.
^{3} The 1909 race was a dead-heat and has joint winners.

== See also ==
- List of German flat horse races
