= Borgia (horse) =

German-bred Thoroughbred racehorse

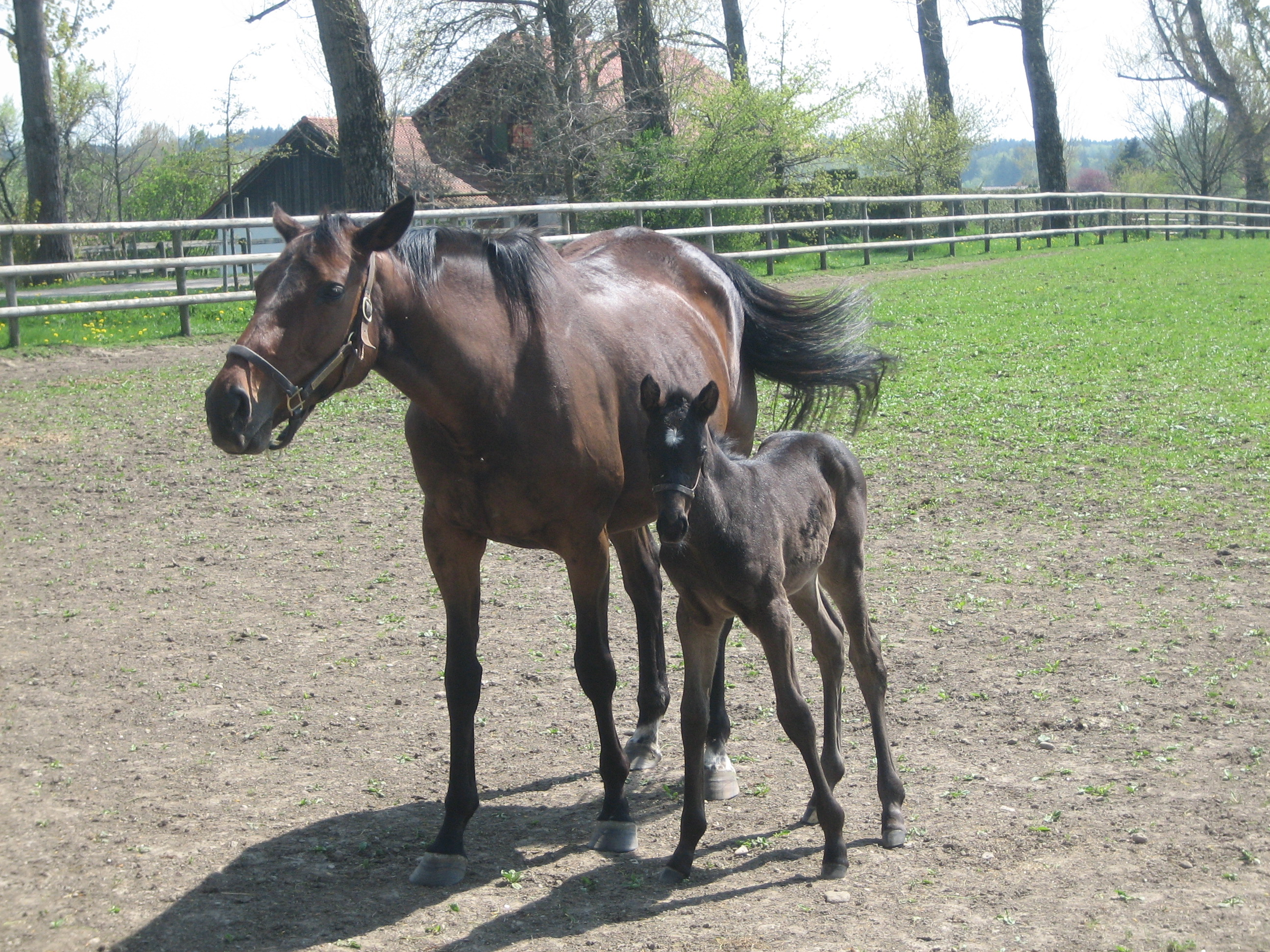
- Borgia with her 2006 foal, Bahama Bay.
- Sire: Acatenango (GER)
- Grandsire: Surumu (GER)
- Dam: Britannia
- Damsire: Tarim (GB)
- Sex: Mare
- Foaled: 1994
- Country: Germany
- Colour: Bay
- Breeder: Gestut Ammerland
- Owner: Gestut Ammerland
- Trainer: Bruno Schütz (Germany); André Fabre (France)
- Record: 22: 6-7-1
- Earnings: $3,038,904

Major wins
- Deutsches Derby; Grosser Preis von Baden (1997); Hong Kong Vase (1999)

Awards
- German Horse of the Year (1997)
- Last updated on 1 April 2011

Borgia (4 April 1994 – 29 March 2012) was a German-bred Thoroughbred racemare that was trained in Germany and France. She won the Deutsches Derby, Grosser Preis von Baden, and Hong Kong Vase.

== Background ==
Borgia was by Acatenango and her dam, Britannia, was by Tarim (GB), making her a half-sister to Boreal, who also won the Deutsches (German) Derby. Bred in Germany, Borgia was sent to France and trained by André Fabre in 1998.

In March 2012, she was put down because of a serious horse colic.

== Racing record ==
Borgia was one of the few fillies to win the Deutsches Derby. In 1997, she also won the Grosser Preis von Baden. She finished third in the Prix de l'Arc de Triomphe and second to Chief Bearheart in the Breeders' Cup Turf, a Group One (G1) weight for age race held in North America. At five, she won the Hong Kong Vase, which is one of the four Hong Kong International Races.

== Stud record ==
After retiring from racing career in 2000 Borgia was in the broodmare band of the stud of her owner, Stud Ammerland. Firstly, she was mated with the European top sire Sadler's Wells. Her four-year-old daughter, Bahama Bay by Dansili, finished fourth in the listed Prix de Royaumont. Borgia’s colt Mutayaser, by Shamardal, sold for 230,000gns to Shadwell. In 2010, she was covered by Sea The Stars at Gilltown Stud in County Kildare.

== Pedigree ==
Pedigree of Borgia (GER), bay mare, 1994
Sire Acatenango (GER) Ch. 1982	Surumu (GER); 1974	Literat	Birkhahn
Sire Acatenango (GER) Ch. 1982	Surumu (GER); 1974	Literat	Lis
Sire Acatenango (GER) Ch. 1982	Surumu (GER); 1974	Surama	Reliance
Sire Acatenango (GER) Ch. 1982	Surumu (GER); 1974	Surama	Suncourt
Sire Acatenango (GER) Ch. 1982	Aggravate; 1966	Aggressor	Combat
Sire Acatenango (GER) Ch. 1982	Aggravate; 1966	Aggressor	Phaetonia
Sire Acatenango (GER) Ch. 1982	Aggravate; 1966	Raven Locks	Mr.Jinks
Sire Acatenango (GER) Ch. 1982	Aggravate; 1966	Raven Locks	Gentlemen's Relish
Dam Britannia Bay 1985	Tarim; 1969	Tudor Melody	Tudor Minstrel
Dam Britannia Bay 1985	Tarim; 1969	Tudor Melody	Matelda
Dam Britannia Bay 1985	Tarim; 1969	Tamerella	Tamerlane
Dam Britannia Bay 1985	Tarim; 1969	Tamerella	Ella Retford
Dam Britannia Bay 1985	Bonna; 1978	Salvo	Right Royal
Dam Britannia Bay 1985	Bonna; 1978	Salvo	Manera
Dam Britannia Bay 1985	Bonna; 1978	Birgit	Altrek
Dam Britannia Bay 1985	Bonna; 1978	Birgit	Borinage (Family: 14-b)
