= Union-Rennen =

Horse race

- Class: Group 2
- Location: Köln-Weidenpesch; Cologne, Germany
- Inaugurated: 1834
- Race type: Flat / Thoroughbred
- Sponsor: Sal. Oppenheim
- Website: Köln-Weidenpesch

Race information
- Distance: 2,200 metres (1m 3f)
- Surface: Turf
- Track: Right-handed
- Qualification: Three-year-olds
- Weight: 58 kg Allowances; 1½ kg for fillies
- Purse: €70,000 (2022); 1st: €40,000

The Union-Rennen is a Group 2 flat horse race in Germany open to three-year-old thoroughbreds. It is run at Cologne over a distance of 2,200 metres (about 1 mile and 3 furlongs), and it is scheduled to take place each year in June.

== History ==
The event was established in 1834, and it was originally held at Tempelhof on the site of what became Berlin Tempelhof Airport. It was initially contested over 2,400 metres, and it was extended to 2,800 metres in 1837.

The race was transferred to Hoppegarten in 1868, and it was cut to 2,200 metres in 1888. It was staged at Grunewald for a short period after World War I, and it returned to Hoppegarten during the 1920s. It was abandoned in 1945 and 1946, and it moved to Cologne in 1947.

The Union-Rennen serves as a trial for the Deutsches Derby, and many horses have won both races. The first was Schwindler, a joint winner of the Derby in 1875. The most recent was Sea The Moon in 2014. The 2025 Deutsches Derby winner, Hochkonig, was runner-up in the Union-Rennen.

With its 191st running in 2026, the Union-Rennen is Germany's oldest surviving horse race.

== Records ==
Leading jockey (7 wins):

- Tom Busby – Roman (1874), Oroszvar (1878), Picklock (1879), Tartar (1883), Fenek (1886), Bulgar (1887), Impuls (1895)

Leading trainer (7 wins):

- George Arnull – Weissdorn (1925), Alba (1930), Aventin (1932), Sturmvogel (1935), Ad Astra (1940), Magnat (1941), Asterblüte (1949)

(note: the trainers of some of the early winners are unknown)

== Winners since 1970 ==
Year	Winner	Jockey	Trainer	Time
1970	Oktavio	Peter Alafi	Sven von Mitzlaff	2:17.10
1971	Florino	Harro Remmert	Georg Zuber	2:27.60
1972	Arratos	Brian Taylor	Heinz Jentzsch	2:20.10
1973	Domador	Peter Alafi	Bruno Schütz	2:17.20
1974	Meinberg	Horst Horwart	Karl-Heinz Schultze	2:22.50
1975	Windwurf	Jerzy Jednaszewski	Heinz Gummelt	2:18.20
1976	Waltz	Greville Starkey	Theo Grieper	2:13.60
1977	Surumu	George Cadwaladr	Adolf Wöhler	2:15.40
1978	Limbo	Bruce Raymond	Oskar Langner	2:18.10
1979	Nebos	Lutz Mäder	Hein Bollow	2:16.60
1980	Navarino	Dave Richardson	Arthur-Paul Schlaefke	2:19.40
1981	Orofino	Peter Alafi	Sven von Mitzlaff	2:15.90
1982	Tombos	Lutz Mäder	Heinz Jentzsch	2:19.90
1983	Anatas	Andrzej Tylicki	Heinz Jentzsch	2:15.60
1984	Daun	Pat Gilson	Theo Grieper	2:18.00
1985	Acatenango	Andrzej Tylicki	Heinz Jentzsch	2:18.20
1986	Orfano	Peter Alafi	Sven von Mitzlaff	2:14.30
1987	Kondor	Peter Remmert	Hein Bollow	2:24.00
1988	Alkalde	Manfred Hofer	Peter Lautner	2:18.96
1989	Turfkönig	Olaf Schick	Uwe Ostmann	2:18.88
1990	Mandelbaum	Georg Bocskai	Uwe Ostmann	2:21.51
1991	Leone	Michael Roberts	Uwe Ostmann	2:17.25
1992	Zohar	Kevin Woodburn	Uwe Ostmann	2:15.58
1993	Kornado	Andre Best	Bruno Schütz	2:13.09
1994	Twen	Kevin Woodburn	Harro Remmert	2:20.86
1995	Lecroix	Manfred Hofer	Mario Hofer	2:19.70
1996	Lavirco	Torsten Mundry	Peter Rau	2:15.52
1997	Caitano	Andrasch Starke	Bruno Schütz	2:24.04
1998	Lanciano	Terence Hellier	Hans Blume	2:25.11
1999	Silvano	Kevin Woodburn	Andreas Wöhler	2:20.00
2000	Network	Andrasch Starke	Andreas Schütz	2:15.27
2001	Sabiango	Andreas Suborics	Andreas Wöhler	2:17.76
2002	Next Desert	Terence Hellier	Andreas Schütz	2:17.15
2003	Dai Jin	Terence Hellier	Andreas Schütz	2:19.79
2004	Malinas	William Mongil	Peter Schiergen	2:18.94
2005	Königstiger	Andreas Suborics	Peter Schiergen	2:16.83
2006	Aspectus	Andrasch Starke	Hans Blume	2:13.92
2007	Axxos	Andrasch Starke	Peter Schiergen	2:21.90
2008	Liang Kay	Terence Hellier	Uwe Ostmann	2:19.97
2009	Wiener Walzer	Adrie de Vries	Jens Hirschberger	2:16.81
2010	Zazou	Terence Hellier	Mario Hofer	2:18.10
2011	Arrigo	Adrie de Vries	Jens Hirschberger	2:17.87
2012	Novellist	Eduardo Pedroza	Andreas Wöhler	2:14.10
2013	Ivanhowe	Adrie de Vries	Wilhelm Giedt	2:14.01
2014	Sea The Moon	Andreas Helfenbein	Markus Klug	2:17.76
2015	Shimrano	Adrie de Vries	Paul Harley	2:16.61
2016	Boscaccio	Dennis Schiergen	Christian Sprengel	2:21.03
2017	Colomano	Andreas Helfenbein	Markus Klug	2:14.44
2018	Weltstar	Adrie de Vries	Markus Klug	2:19.42
2019	Laccario	Eduardo Pedroza	Andreas Wöhler	2:14.31
2020	Wonderful Moon	Andrasch Starke	Henk Grewe	2:17.84
2021	Best Of Lips	Lukas Delozier	Andreas Suborics	2:14.18
2022	Sammarco	Bauyrzhan Murzabayev	Peter Schiergen	2:19.12
2023	Straight	Jozef Bojko	Andreas Wöhler	2:11.86
2024	Narrativo	Adrie de Vries	Peter Schiergen	2:16.26
2025	Zuckerhut	Andrasch Starke	Peter Schiergen	2:17.28
2026	Englishman	Enzo Crublet	Marcel Weiss	2:16.77

== Earlier winners ==
- 1834: Alba
- 1835: Remus
- 1836: Donna Maria
- 1837: Mozart
- 1838: My Lady
- 1839: Mandarin
- 1840: Kipfelnose
- 1841: Prince Regent
- 1842: Banquo
- 1843: Madeline
- 1844: John Bull
- 1845: Minotaurus
- 1846: Dolores
- 1847: Whatstone
- 1848: Meridian
- 1849: Achaja
- 1850: Black Prince
- 1851: Lionel
- 1852: California
- 1853: Uriel
- 1854: Koh-i-Noor
- 1855: Carabas
- 1856: My Hope
- 1857: Verzug
- 1858: Pizarro
- 1859: Collingwood
- 1860: Emilius
- 1861: Rookeby
- 1862: Wildrose
- 1863: Last Pippin
- 1864: Pauline
- 1865: Bellario
- 1866: Adalbert
- 1867: Pocahontas
- 1868: Gorgo
- 1869: Ignorant
- 1870: Flibustier
- 1871: Stachel
- 1872: Sonntag
- 1873: Hochstapler
- 1874: Roman
- 1875: Schwindler
- 1876: Good Hope
- 1877: Zützen
- 1878: Oroszvar
- 1879: Picklock
- 1880: Mereny
- 1881: Orient
- 1882: Taurus
- 1883: Tartar
- 1884: Czimer
- 1885: Italy
- 1886: Fenek
- 1887: Bulgar
- 1888: Burgwart
- 1889: Aba
- 1890: Dalberg
- 1891: Alnok
- 1892: Dorn
- 1893: Geier
- 1894: Adonis
- 1895: Impuls
- 1896: Rondinelli
- 1897: Destillateur
- 1898: Vollmond
- 1899: Gastfreund
- 1900: Pomp
- 1901: Nicus
- 1902: Prinz Hamlet
- 1903: Laurin
- 1904: Pathos
- 1905: Festino
- 1906: Parmenio
- 1907: Rojestwensky
- 1908: Bajazzo
- 1909: Swirtigal
- 1910: Wandersmann
- 1911: Mondstein
- 1912: Matterhorn
- 1913: Majestic
- 1914: Ariel
- 1915: Languard
- 1916: Taucher
- 1917: Landgraf
- 1918: Orilus
- 1919: Eckstein
- 1920: Nubier
- 1921: König Midas
- 1922: Lentulus
- 1923: Augias
- 1924: Fundin
- 1925: Weissdorn
- 1926: Ferro
- 1927: Torero
- 1928: Lupus
- 1929: Graf Isolani
- 1930: Alba
- 1931: Agathon
- 1932: Aventin
- 1933: Alchimist
- 1934: Travertin
- 1935: Sturmvogel
- 1936: Periander
- 1937: Blasius
- 1938: Frauenpreis
- 1939: Organdy
- 1940: Ad Astra
- 1941: Magnat
- 1942: Effendi
- 1943: Panzerturm
- 1944: Poet
- 1945–46: no race
- 1947: Volkstanz
- 1948: Angeber
- 1949: Asterblüte
- 1950: Niederländer
- 1951: Neckar
- 1952: Grenzbock
- 1953: Liebesmahl
- 1954: Blumenprinz
- 1955: König Ottokar
- 1956: Kilometer
- 1957: Windfang
- 1958: Grind
- 1959: Wettcoup
- 1960: Mohikaner
- 1961: Baalim
- 1962: Amboss
- 1963: Gladstone
- 1964: Marinus
- 1965: Fioravanti
- 1966: Ilix
- 1967: Luciano
- 1968: Literat
- 1969: Akari

== See also ==
- List of German flat horse races
