= Blue Canari =

French Thoroughbred racehorse

- Sire: Acatenango
- Grandsire: Surumu
- Dam: Delicieuse Lady
- Damsire: Trempolino
- Sex: Stallion
- Foaled: 2 February 2001
- Country: France
- Colour: Chestnut
- Breeder: Meridian Stud
- Owner: Jean-Louis Bouchard
- Trainer: Pascal Bary
- Record: 14: 2-0-4
- Earnings: £484,445

Major wins
- Prix du Jockey Club (2004)

== Background ==
In August 2002, Blue Canari was consigned by the Haras du Mezeray to the Deauville yearling sale and was bought for €135,000 by the Chantilly Bloodstock Agency, acting on behalf of Jean-Louis Bouchard. The colt was sent into training with Pascal Bary and was ridden in most of his races by Thierry Thulliez.

== Racing career ==
=== 2003: two-year-old season ===
Blue Canari began his racing career in a contest for previously unraced colts and geldings over 1600 metres at Deauville Racecourse on 21 October in which he finished third, beaten three quarters of a length and a nose by Fast And Furious and Mistral D'Arnoult. Seventeen days later, the colt started at odds of 7/2 for the Prix Mieuxce over 1800 metres at Maisons-Laffitte Racecourse and recorded his first success, taking the lead 150 metres from the finish and winning by a head from Reefscape, a colt who went on to win the Prix du Cadran.

=== 2004: three-year-old season ===
In the spring of 2004, Blue Canari ran in three trial races for the Prix du Jockey Club. On 4 April, he stayed on in the straight to finish third behind Prospect Park and Millemix in the Listed Prix de Courcelles over 2100 metres at Longchamp Racecourse. When moved up in class for the Group Two Prix Greffulhe over the same course and distance three weeks later, he again finished strongly to take fifth behind Millemix, Esperanto, Day Or Night, and Vasilievsky. He was promoted to fourth after Esperanto was relegated for causing interference in the straight. He was then stepped up in distance for the Listed Prix de l'Avre over 2400 metres on 19 May and finished third behind Reefscape and Ange Gardien, appearing to be outpaced by the first two in the closing stages.

On 6 June, Blue Canari, ridden as usual by Thulliez, started a 33/1 outsider for the 167th running of the Prix du Jockey Club over 2400 metres at Chantilly Racecourse. Prospect Park, Reefscape, Day Or Night, and Ange Gardien were again in opposition, whilst the other leading contenders included the British-trained Day Flight, the Prix Hocquart winner Lord du Sud, Delfos (Prix La Force), and Valixir (Prix Matchem). Thulliez held the colt up at the back of the fifteen-runner field and was eleventh on the final turn. He began to make progress 400 metres from the finish, emerged as a serious challenger in the closing stages, and overtook Prospect Park in the final stride to win by a head, with Valixir and Day Flight just behind. His victory was a fifth in the race for Bary after Celtic Arms, Ragmar, Dream Well, and Sulamani, the first two of which were also owned by Bouchard. After the race, both trainer and jockey of the winner admitted to being surprised by the result. Bary revealed that the horse had only taken his chance because Bouchard had said in a telephone conversation five days earlier that it would be "amusing" to run. Thulliez said, "I couldn't believe it. I rode a very economical race because we didn't think he had a first chance but he found a tremendous turn of foot and battled to the line."

After a break of more than three months, Blue Canari returned for an autumn campaign. He finished fifth behind Valixir in the Prix Niel with Bary saying after the race that the colt was "very rusty" following his lengthy absence. He then ran twelfth behind Bago when a 40/1 outsider for the Prix de l'Arc de Triomphe in October.

=== 2005 & 2006: later career ===
Blue Canari ran four times as a four-year-old. He finished seventh behind Bago in the Prix Ganay, sixth behind Geordieland in the Grand Prix de Chantilly, and fourth behind Ostankino in the Prix Maurice de Nieuil. On his final appearance of the year, he was moved up in distance and finished fourth to Reefcape in the 3100 metre Prix Gladiateur at Longchamp in September.

Blue Canari remained in training as a five-year-old in 2006 and made two appearances. He finished third in a minor race at Longchamp in April and sixth in a similar event at Deauville-Clairefontaine Racecourse in August.

== Stud record ==
In November 2006, Blue Canari was offered for sale at Tattersalls and bought for 90,000 guineas by the Swiss-based Gestut Sohrenhof, and was exported to stand as a breeding stallion in Switzerland. He has sired a few winners, but nothing of top-class.

== Pedigree ==
Pedigree of Blue Canari (FRA), chestnut stallion, 2001
Sire Acatenango (GER) 1982	Surumu (GER); 1974	Literat	Birkhahn
Sire Acatenango (GER) 1982	Surumu (GER); 1974	Literat	Lis
Sire Acatenango (GER) 1982	Surumu (GER); 1974	Surama	Reliance
Sire Acatenango (GER) 1982	Surumu (GER); 1974	Surama	Suncourt
Sire Acatenango (GER) 1982	Aggravate (GB); 1966	Aggressor	Combat
Sire Acatenango (GER) 1982	Aggravate (GB); 1966	Aggressor	Phaetonia
Sire Acatenango (GER) 1982	Aggravate (GB); 1966	Raven Locks	Mr Jinks
Sire Acatenango (GER) 1982	Aggravate (GB); 1966	Raven Locks	Gentlemen's Relish
Dam Deliceuse Lady (GB) 1995	Trempolino (USA); 1984	Sharpen Up	Atan
Dam Deliceuse Lady (GB) 1995	Trempolino (USA); 1984	Sharpen Up	Rocchetta
Dam Deliceuse Lady (GB) 1995	Trempolino (USA); 1984	Trephine	Viceregal
Dam Deliceuse Lady (GB) 1995	Trempolino (USA); 1984	Trephine	Quiriquina
Dam Deliceuse Lady (GB) 1995	Savoureuse Lady (GB); 1987	Caerleon	Nijinsky
Dam Deliceuse Lady (GB) 1995	Savoureuse Lady (GB); 1987	Caerleon	Foreseer
Dam Deliceuse Lady (GB) 1995	Savoureuse Lady (GB); 1987	Amazer	Mincio
Dam Deliceuse Lady (GB) 1995	Savoureuse Lady (GB); 1987	Amazer	Alzara (Family 1-k)
