= Acatenango (horse) =

German-bred Thoroughbred racehorse

- Sire: Surumu
- Grandsire: Literat
- Dam: Aggravate
- Damsire: Aggressor
- Sex: Stallion
- Foaled: 1982
- Country: Germany
- Colour: Chestnut
- Breeder: Gestut Faehrhof
- Owner: Gestut Faehrhof
- Trainer: Heinz Jentzsch
- Record: 24: 16-0-3
- Earnings: €891,970

Major wins
- Grosser Hertie-Preis (1985); Union-Rennen (1985); Deutsches Derby (1985); Aral-Pokal (1985 & 1986); Gerling-Preis (1986 & 1987); Grosser Preis der Badischen Wirtschaft (1986); Grosser Preis von Berlin (1986); Grand Prix de Saint-Cloud (1986); Grosser Preis von Baden (1986 & 1987); Hansa-Preis (1987)

Awards
- German Horse of the Year (1985, 1986, 1987); Leading sire in Germany (1993, 1995, 1997, 1999, 2001); Timeform rating: 127 in 1986 & 1987
- Last updated on 9 December 2007

Acatenango (1982–2005) was a German Thoroughbred racehorse. Sired by the Deutsches Derby winner and German Champion sire, Surumu, he was out of the English mare Aggravate. Acatenango's ancestry includes German Champion sire Dark Ronald, the French Champion sire, Tantieme, English Triple Crown champion Gainsborough, and the most influential Italian sire, Nearco.

Racing in 1984 at age two, Acatenango's best finish was a third in the Ratibor-Rennen at Krefeld. In 1985 he embarked on a thirteen-race winning streak that tied a European record held by Ardross and Brigadier Gerard. Included in his wins were the Grosser Bavaria Preis, a listed race at Munich Racecourse, and the important Group One Aral-Pokal (known as the Grosser Preis von Bayern since 1998) at the Gelsenkirchen Racecourse in Gelsenkirchen. Acatenango's most important win that year came in the Deutsches Derby, the equivalent of the United Kingdom's Epsom Derby and America's Kentucky Derby. His performances earned him 1985 German Horse of the Year honors.

In 1986, Acatenango continued his winning streak. Usually ridden in Germany by jockey Andrzej Tylicki, under jockey Georg Bocskai he won his second Aral-Pokal, defeated Theatrical in winning the Grosser Preis von Berlin, and scored the first of his two consecutive wins in the Grosser Preis von Baden, Germany's most prestigious horse race. Racing outside of the country, in 1986 Steve Cauthen rode Acatenango to victory in the Group One Grand Prix de Saint-Cloud at the Saint-Cloud Racecourse in France. For the second year he was voted German Horse of the Year.

In 1987, Acatenango won his second straight Grosser Preis von Baden and was third to winner Triptych in the Coronation Cup at Epsom Downs in England. His performances earned him his third consecutive German Horse of the Year title.

Retired to stud duty at his owner's breeding farm, Acatenango was the leading sire in Germany in 1993, 1995, 1997, 1999, and 2001. His sons and daughters include:

- Lando, winner of the 1993 Deutsches Derby and the 1995 Japan Cup
- Borgia, the 1997 Deutsches Derby and Grosser Preis von Baden winner
- Fraulein, winner in Canada of the 2002 E. P. Taylor Stakes.
- Blue Canari, winner in France of the 2004 Prix du Jockey Club
- Sabiango, won the 2001 Rheinland-Pokal, 2003 Deutschland-Preis, and in the United States the 2004 Charles Whittingham Memorial Handicap
- Nicaron, won the 2005 Deutsches Derby
- Dalicia, won the 2005 Preis der Sparkassen-Finanzgruppe, dam of the 2011 Kentucky Derby winner Animal Kingdom
- Wurftaube, won the 1996 German St. Leger, dam of 2011 Deutsches Derby winner Waldpark and Waldmark dam of Masked Marvel

Due to declining fertility Acatenango was retired from stud duties in 2004. He was humanely euthanized on 2 April 2005 at the age of 23 following an accident in his paddock.

== Sire line tree ==
- Acatenango
  - Lando
    - Caracciola
    - Paolini
    - Epalo
    - Air Force One
    - Prince Flori
    - Sharstar
    - Scalo
    - Sound
  - Sabiango
  - Blue Canari
  - Nicaron
