= Surumu =

German-bred Thoroughbred racehorse

- Sire: Literat
- Grandsire: Birkhahn
- Dam: Surama
- Damsire: Reliance
- Sex: Stallion
- Foaled: 1974
- Country: Germany
- Colour: Chestnut
- Breeder: Jacobs family
- Owner: Jacobs family
- Record: 9: 3 - 1 - 2
- Earnings: € 192.507

Major wins
- Union Rennen (1977); Deutsches Derby (1977)

Awards
- Champion Sire (from 1985 to 1986 and from 1989 to 1992)

Surumu (26 February 1974 – 3 November 1999) was a German Thoroughbred racehorse and an important sire.

== Background ==
Surumu, a chestnut, was foaled in 1974 at the Jacobs family's Gestüt Fährhof near Bremen. He was from the Dark Ronald male line. His sire was Literat and his dam was Surama by Reliance II. Literat was a German 2000 Guineas winner, who, as a hot favourite and ridden by Lester Piggott, broke down in the Deutsches Derby, nevertheless finishing 5th in that race.

== Racing career ==
At three Surumu won both the Union Rennen (Grade 2) and the Deutsches Derby (Grade 1). Total earning of Surumu was € 192.507. On both occasions he was ridden by George Cadwaladr a top quality flat jockey who rode in the UK, Germany and Hong Kong.

== Stud record ==
After retirement Surumu became one of the cornerstones of German horse breeding. He was six-time champion sire in Germany (from 1985 to 1986 and from 1989 to 1992). In addition, he was named twice as champion broodmare sire, and died on 3 November 1999.

Among his notable sons is Acatenango, who won seven Grade 1 races, including the Grand Prix de Saint-Cloud. Others include Mondrian, Temporal and Italian Derby-winner Osorio. Surumu was also grandsire of the Japan Cup winner Lando, the 2002 German champion sire Lomitas and Borgia. Surumu was damsire of Monsun and Hurricane Run.

== Sire line tree ==
- Surumu
  - Acatenango
    - Lando
      - Caracciola
      - Paolini
      - Epalo
      - Air Force One
      - Prince Flori
      - Sharstar
      - Scalo
      - Sound
    - Sabiango
    - Blue Canari
    - Nicaron
  - Mondrian
  - Temporal
  - Osorio
