= Hessen-Pokal =

Group 3 flat horse race in Germany

- Class: Group 3
- Location: Frankfurt Racecourse; Frankfurt, Germany
- Inaugurated: 1967
- Race type: Flat / Thoroughbred
- Website: Frankfurt

Race information
- Distance: 2,000 metres (1¼ miles)
- Surface: Turf
- Track: Left-handed
- Qualification: Three-years-old and up
- Weight: 56 kg (3yo); 57½ kg (4yo+); Allowances; 1½ kg for fillies and mares 1 kg if not won €12,000 * Penalties; 3 kg for Group 1 winners * 2 kg for Group 2 winners * 1 kg for Group 3 winners * * since January 1
- Purse: €55,000 (2012); 1st: €32,000

The Hessen-Pokal (Hesse Cup) is a Group 3 flat horse race in Germany open to thoroughbreds aged three years or older. It is run at Frankfurt over a distance of 2,000 metres (about 1¼ miles), and it is scheduled to take place each year in November.

The race was moved to Krefeld and renamed Niederrhein-Pokal (Lower Rhine Cup) in 2014. The race was moved to Hoppegarten in 2018 and renamed Silbernes Pferd.

== History ==
The event was established in 1967, and it was originally called the Concentra-Pokal. It used to be held in July, and was initially contested over 2,550 metres. It was cut to 2,500 metres in 1971.

The race was given Group 3 status in 1973. It was shortened to 2,000 metres in 1974. It was renamed after Hesse, the German state where Frankfurt is located, in 1979.

The Hessen-Pokal was promoted to Group 2 level in 1987. It was relegated back to Group 3 in 1989. For a period it was known as the Frankfurt-Pokal.

The race was extended to 2,050 metres in 1999, and restored to 2,000 metres in 2001. It was switched to November in 2006.

The race was extended to 3,000 metres in 2018.

== Records ==
Most successful horse (2 wins):

- Harris – 1977, 1979
- Twist King – 1989, 1990
- Lordano - 2023, 2025
- Vif Monsieur - 2014, 2015

Leading jockey (4 wins):

- Andrasch Starke - Devil Picker Peek (1997), Elle Shadow (2010), Nikkei (2018), Lordano (2023)

Leading trainer (6 wins):

- Peter Schiergen – Catella (1999), Imperioso (2000), Zöllner (2001), Soldier Hollow (2004), Elle Shadow (2010), Nikkei (2018)
- Andreas Wohler - Sugunas (1992), Street Poker (2002), King's Hall (2011), Seismos (2012), Ladykiller (2019) Silence Please (2022)

== Winners ==
Year	Winner	Age	Jockey	Trainer	Time
1967	On Dit	3	Harro Remmert	Sven von Mitzlaff	2:37.60
1968	Zachäus	7	Joan Pall	Andreas Hecker	2:35.80
1969	Gin	6	Johannes Starosta	Arthur-Paul Schlaefke	2:39.40
1970	Elviro	5	Peter Alafi	Sven von Mitzlaff	2:39.70
1971	Selekta	6	Manfred Kosman	Dr A. Stocks	2:35.10
1972	Furka	6	Raimund Prinzinger	R. Zachmeier	2:36.80
1973	Sarto	5	Fritz Drechsler	Heinz Jentzsch	2:38.00
1974	Star Appeal	4	Manfred Kosman	Anton Pohlkötter	2:00.50
1975	Record Run	4	Brian Taylor	Gavin Pritchard-Gordon	2:04.00
1976	Red Regent	4	Pat Eddery	Peter Walwyn	2:04.80
1977	Harris	5	Bruce Raymond	Oskar Langner	2:02.80
1978	Ziethen	4	Paul Cook	Theo Grieper	2:08.10
1979	Harris	7	Bruce Raymond	Uwe Ostmann	2:04.70
1980	Mokka	5	Otto Gervai	Charly Seiffert	2:05.10
1981	no race
1982	Ti Amo	4	Bruce Raymond	Franz-Felix Schreiner	2:02.00
1983	Hill's Pageant	4	Joe Mercer	Peter Walwyn	2:03.70
1984	Hot Touch	4	Steve Cauthen	Geoff Wragg	2:08.20
1985	Diu Star	5	Lutz Mäder	Theo Grieper	2:04.60
1986	Grauer Wicht	5	Bernd Selle	Hartmut Steguweit	2:02.00
1987	Nuas	3	Terence Kelleher	Theo Grieper	2:05.00
1988	Highland Chieftain	5	Willie Carson	John Dunlop	2:05.60
1989	Twist King	4	Dragan Ilic	Peter Lautner	2:05.60
1990	Twist King	5	Dragan Ilic	Peter Lautner	2:04.31
1991	Sir Felix	5	Michael Roberts	Mario Hofer	2:05.14
1992	Sugunas	4	Andreas Boschert	Andreas Wöhler	2:05.40
1993	Iron Fighter	4	Ronald Hillis	Horst Steinmetz	2:05.84
1994	Latmos	4	Terence Hellier	Peter Rau	2:06.36
1995	Solon	3	Peter Schiergen	Heinz Jentzsch	2:06.32
1996	Dankeston	3	Michael Roberts	Michael Bell	2:04.84
1997	Devil River Peek	5	Andrasch Starke	Bruno Schütz	2:10.53
1998	Aboard	3	Stanley Chin	Andreas Schütz	2:05.36
1999	Catella	3	Andreas Suborics	Peter Schiergen	2:05.71
2000	Imperioso	4	Terence Hellier	Peter Schiergen	2:11.06
2001	Zöllner	3	Jimmy Quinn	Peter Schiergen	2:09.30
2002	Street Poker	4	Andreas Boschert	Andreas Wöhler	2:04.12
2003	Picotee	6	Jimmy Quinn	Dr Andreas Bolte	2:07.16
2004	Soldier Hollow	4	Andreas Suborics	Peter Schiergen	2:10.16
2005	Tarlac	4	Terence Hellier	Andreas Schütz	2:03.69
2006	Wiesenpfad	3	Johan Victoire	Waldemar Hickst	2:22.69
2007	Fair Breeze	4	Andreas Helfenbein	Mario Hofer	2:17.41
2008	Lady Deauville ^{[a]}	3	Hayley Turner	Paul Blockley	2:12.30
2009	Zafisio	3	Graham Gibbons	Roger Curtis	2:19.65
2010	Elle Shadow ^{[b]}	3	Andrasch Starke	Peter Schiergen	2:18.39
2011	King's Hall	3	Eduardo Pedroza	Andreas Wöhler	2:11.26
2012	Seismos	4	Andrea Atzeni	Andreas Wöhler	2:14.57
2013	Adriana	5	Lennart Hammer-Hansen	M Rulec	2:20.80
2014	Vif Monsieur	4	Koen Clijmans	S Smrczek	2:13.14
2015	Vif Monsieur	5	Koen Clijmans	S Smrczek	2:12.69
2016	Amazona	4	Andreas Helfenbein	Jean-Pierre Carvalho	2:03.79
2017	Veneto	4	Alexander Pietsch	Andreas Suborics	2:17.08
2018	Nikkei	3	Andrasch Starke	Peter Schiergen	3:15.50
2019	Ladykiller	3	Bauyrzhan Murzabayev	Andreas Wohler	3:19.37
2021	Aff Un Zo	3	Maxim Pecheur	Markus Klug	3:10.32
2022	Silence Please	5	Jozef Bojko	Andreas Wohler	3:16.40
2023	Lordano	4	Andrasch Starke	Marcel Weiss	3:30.44
2024	Flatten The Curve	5	Thore Hammer-Hansen	Hank Grewe	3:19.90
2025	Lordano	6	Rene Piechulek	Marcel Weiss	3:21.56

^{a} The 2008 running took place at Hanover.
^{b} The 2010 edition was held at Dortmund.

== See also ==
- List of German flat horse races
- Recurring sporting events established in 1967 – this race is included under its original title, Concentra-Pokal.
