= Preis des Winterfavoriten =

- Class: Group 3
- Location: Köln-Weidenpesch; Cologne, Germany
- Inaugurated: 1899
- Race type: Flat / Thoroughbred
- Website: Köln-Weidenpesch

Race information
- Distance: 1,600 metres (1 mile)
- Surface: Turf
- Track: Right-handed
- Qualification: Two-year-olds
- Weight: 58 kg Allowances; 1½ kg for fillies
- Purse: €155,000 (2021); 1st: €85,000

The Preis des Winterfavoriten is a Group 3 flat horse race in Germany open to two-year-old thoroughbreds. It is run at Cologne over a distance of 1,600 metres (about 1 mile), and it is scheduled to take place each year in October.

== History ==
The event was established in 1899, and it was originally contested at Cologne over 1,600 metres. It was held at Karlshorst in 1919, and cut to 1,400 metres in 1920.

The race was staged at Hoppegarten in 1940. It was switched to Munich and reverted to 1,600 metres in 1946. It returned to Cologne in 1947.

For a period the Preis des Winterfavoriten was classed at Listed level. It was given Group 3 status in 1998. It took place at Düsseldorf in 2012.

== Records ==
Leading jockey (6 wins):

- Otto Schmidt – Graf Ferry (1920), Lentulus (1921), Favor (1924), Janitor (1932), Elritzling (1936), Peperl (1940)
- Georg Bocskai – Lagunas (1983), Lirung (1984), Zampano (1986), Bluegrass Native (1989), Treecracker (1990), El Maimoun (1997)

Leading trainer (9 wins):

- Heinz Jentzsch – Dschingis Khan (1963), Lombard (1969), Experte (1971), Esclavo (1978), Lagunas (1983), Lirung (1984), Oldtimer (1985), Zampano (1986), Lando (1992)

(note: the trainers of some of the early winners are unknown)

== Winners since 1970 ==
Year	Winner	Jockey	Trainer	Time
1970	Widschi	Yves Saint-Martin	Theo Grieper	1:41.90
1971	Experte	Fritz Drechsler	Heinz Jentzsch	1:41.60
1972	Tannenberg	Jerzy Jednaszewski	Heinz Gummelt	1:42.10
1973	Benedikt	Peter Alafi	Bruno Schütz	1:40.30
1974	Alfredo	Gérard Rivases	Theo Grieper	1:44.40
1975	Andrang	Manfred Prinzinger	M. Biermann	1:40.80
1976	Cagliostro	José Orihuel	Hein Bollow	1:41.80
1977	Sabik	Lutz Mäder	Herbert Cohn	1:42.20
1978	Esclavo	Joan Pall	Heinz Jentzsch	1:38.20
1979	Aspros	Maurice Philipperon	Theo Grieper	1:39.70
1980	Anna Paola	Joan Pall	Theo Grieper	1:40.30
1981	Winkeladvokat	Stephen Eccles	Adolf Wöhler	1:42.00
1982	Nandino	Horst Horwart	Heinz Hesse	1:44.00
1983	Lagunas	Georg Bocskai	Heinz Jentzsch	1:36.10
1984	Lirung	Georg Bocskai	Heinz Jentzsch	1:42.50
1985	Oldtimer	Andrzej Tylicki	Heinz Jentzsch	1:38.70
1986	Zampano	Georg Bocskai	Heinz Jentzsch	1:44.40
1987	Twist King	Dragan Ilic	Peter Lautner	1:43.10
1988	Turfkönig	Olaf Schick	Uwe Ostmann	1:42.40
1989	Bluegrass Native	Georg Bocskai	Uwe Ostmann	1:42.10
1990	Treecracker	Georg Bocskai	Uwe Ostmann	1:39.50
1991	Vincenzo	Mark Rimmer	Bruno Schütz	1:42.30
1992	Lando	Andrzej Tylicki	Heinz Jentzsch	1:40.42
1993	Fire King	Manfred Hofer	Mario Hofer	1:43.63
1994	Chato	Andrasch Starke	Horst Steinmetz	1:38.60
1995	Lavirco	Torsten Mundry	Peter Rau	1:38.90
1996	Eden Rock	Andrasch Starke	Bruno Schütz	1:39.90
1997	El Maimoun	Georg Bocskai	Mario Hofer	1:38.43
1998	Sumitas	Andreas Suborics	Peter Schiergen	1:42.27
1999	Glad Master	Jiri Palik	Hans-Walter Hiller	1:42.31
2000	Cheirokratie	Lennart Hammer-Hansen	Andreas Schütz	1:42.15
2001	Peppershot	Andreas Helfenbein	Uwe Ostmann	1:39.17
2002	Eagle Rise	Andreas Suborics	Andreas Schütz	1:39.10
2003	Glad Lion	Andreas Helfenbein	Uwe Ostmann	1:40.04
2004	Manduro	Terence Hellier	Peter Schiergen	1:40.19
2005	Aspectus	Adrie de Vries	Hans Blume	1:35.82
2006	Molly Max	Filip Minarik	Karen Haustein	1:38.16
2007	Precious Boy	Adrie de Vries	Waldemar Hickst	1:37.78
2008	Globus	Terence Hellier	Uwe Ostmann	1:42.25
2009	Glad Tiger	Yann Lerner	Uwe Ostmann	1:44.05
2010	Silvaner	Terence Hellier	Peter Schiergen	1:45.29
2011	Tai Chi	Thierry Thulliez	Werner Baltromei	1:39.98
2012	Limario ^{[a]}	Alexander Pietsch	Roland Dzubasz	1:44.30
2013	Born To Run ^{[b]}	Stephen Hellyn	Roland Dzubasz	1:43.28
2014	Brisanto	Martin Seidl	Miltcho G. Mintchev	1:42.87
2015	Isfahan	Umberto Rispoli	Andreas Wöhler	1:40.88
2016	Langtang	Jozef Bojko	Andreas Wöhler	1:33.86
2017	Erasmus	Adrie de Vries	Markus Klug	1:39.37
2018	Noble Moon	Andrasch Starke	Peter Schiergen	1:36.08
2019	Rubaiyat	Clement Lecoeuvre	Henk Grewe	1:41.52
2020	Best Of Lips	Franny Norton	Andreas Suborics	1:40.19
2021	Sea Bay	Adrie de Vries	Henk Grewe	1:39.27
2022	Fantastic Moon	Rene Piechulek	Sarah Steinberg	1:38.38
2023	Geography	Rene Piechulek	Peter Schiergen	1:35.21
2024	Lifetimes	Bauyrzhan Murzabayev	Peter Schiergen	1:39,76
2025	Gostam	Eduardo Pedroza	Andreas Wöhler	1:38,38

^{a} The 2012 running took place at Düsseldorf.
^{b} The 2013 running took place at Munich

== Earlier winners ==
- 1899: Hagen
- 1900: Slyvnitza
- 1901: Sirocco
- 1902: Barcarole
- 1903: Bravour
- 1904: Ganges
- 1905: Fels
- 1906: Hochzeit
- 1907: For Ever
- 1908: Fervor
- 1909: Hort
- 1910: Malteser
- 1911: Dolomit
- 1912: Fabella
- 1913: Orelio
- 1914–15: no race
- 1916: Ayesha
- 1917: Traum
- 1918: Tulipan
- 1919: Nubier
- 1920: Graf Ferry
- 1921: Lentulus
- 1922: Revolutionär
- 1923: no race
- 1924: Favor
- 1925: Wachholder
- 1926: Mah Jong
- 1927: Contessa Maddalena
- 1928: Tantris
- 1929: Mellitus
- 1930: Adrienne
- 1931: Aventin
- 1932: Janitor
- 1933: Waffenschmied
- 1934: Artischocke
- 1935: Edel-Bitter
- 1936: Elritzling
- 1937: Astrologie
- 1938: Tatjana
- 1939: Fortissimo
- 1940: Peperl
- 1941: Adlerflug
- 1942: Aufbruch
- 1943: Schildhorn
- 1944–45: no race
- 1946: Xantos
- 1947: Signal
- 1948: Schütze
- 1949: Asterios
- 1950: Grande
- 1951: Grenzbock
- 1952: Yorck
- 1953: Giovanni
- 1954: Macbeth
- 1955: Liebeslied
- 1956: Solotänzerin
- 1957: Leichtsinn
- 1958: Basuto
- 1959: Wiener Walzer
- 1960: Baalim
- 1961: Amboss
- 1962: Gracchus
- 1963: Dschingis Khan
- 1964: Waidwerk
- 1965: Bandit
- 1966: Silbersee
- 1967: Tamus
- 1968: Tannenbruch
- 1969: Lombard

== See also ==
- List of German flat horse races
