= Hamburger Stuten-Preis =

Horse race in Germany

Hamburger Stuten-Preis Grosser Preis von LOTTO Hamburg
- Class: Group 3
- Location: Horner Rennbahn; Hamburg, Germany
- Inaugurated: 1952
- Race type: Flat / Thoroughbred
- Sponsor: LOTTO Hamburg
- Website: Hamburg

Race information
- Distance: 2,200 metres (1m 3f)
- Surface: Turf
- Track: Right-handed
- Qualification: Three-year-old fillies
- Weight: 58 kg
- Purse: €55,000 (2012); 1st: €32,000

Hamburger Stuten-Preis
2021
Sconset	Amazing Grace	Walkaway

Previous years
2020
Virginia Joy	Zamrud	For Pleasure
2019
Durance	Anna Pivola	Shining Pass
2018
Taraja	Dina	Night Of England
2017
Lacazar	Diana Storm	Navaro Girl
2015
Anna Katharina	Amona	Turfdonna
2014
Papagena Star	Lacy	Oriental Magic
2013
Daytona Bay	Quilita	Ars Nova
2012
Salomina	Caitania	Wilddrossel
2011
Karsabruni	Labrice	Alkhana

2010-2000
2010
Miss Starlight	Elle Shadow	Ovambo Queen
2009
Night Magic	Miss Europa	Norderney
2008
Lady Marian	Ashantee	Umirage
2007
Avanti Polonia	Neele	Fair Breeze
2006
Wurfscheibe	Cliffrose	Litalia
2005
Gonbarda	Lotta	Tartouche
2004
Vallera	Next Gina	Give Me Five
2003
Saldenschwinge	Lysuna	Luttje Lage
2002
Casanga	Saldenschwinge	Templerin
2001
Abitara	Nouvelle Fortune	Blush Damask
2000
Moonlady	Tres Ravi	Wild Side

The Hamburger Stuten-Preis is a Group 3 flat horse race in Germany open to three-year-old thoroughbred fillies. It is run at Hamburg-Horn over a distance of 2,200 metres (about 1 mile and 3 furlongs), and is scheduled to take place each year in late June or early July.

== History ==
The event was established in 1952, and it was originally held at Neuss. It was initially staged in the autumn, and for periods it was called the Herbst Stutenpreis or the Neusser Stutenpreis. It was open to fillies and mares aged three or older and usually contested over 2,100 metres. It was given Group 3 status in 1976.

The race was transferred to Hamburg and extended to 2,200 metres in 1995. From this point it was known as the Deutscher Herold-Preis. An ungraded event titled the Neusser Stutenpreis continued at its former venue until 1997.

The Hamburger Stuten-Preis has had several different names, and some have been assigned to various other races. Its titles have included the Alice-Cup (2005), the Fährhofer Stutenpreis (2006–07), the Grosser Preis der Jungheinrich Gabelstapler (2008–09) and the Mehl-Muhlens Trophy from 2018.

The race was restricted to three-year-old fillies in 2008.

== Records ==
Most successful horse (2 wins):

- Andrea – 1958, 1959

Leading jockey (4 wins):

- Oskar Langner – Imola (1954), Ordenstreue (1966), On Dit (1967), Ordinanz (1968)
- Andrasch Starke - Risen Raven (1994), Salomina (2012), Lacazar (2017), Durance (2019)
- Andreas Helfenbein - Arastou (1992), Papagena Star (2014), Anna Katharina (2015), Near England (2016)

Leading trainer (7 wins):

- Heinz Jentzsch – Inga (1969), Sheba (1973), Idrissa (1975), Indian Pearl (1978), La Colorada (1984), Risen Raven (1994), Alpha City (1995)
- Peter Schiergen - Catella (1999), Casanga (2002), Avanti Polonia (2007), Salomina (2012), Lacazar (2017), Durance (2019), Sconset (2021)

== Winners since 1979 ==
Year	Winner	Age	Jockey	Trainer	Time
1979	Tannenprinzessin	3	Peter Alafi	Sven von Mitzlaff	2:14.40
1980	Indigene	3	Jean-Pierre Lefèvre	Philippe Lallié	2:09.50
1981	Adita	3	Dave Richardson	Werner Krbalek	2:16.60
1982	Dreaming Away	3	Paul Cook	Ian Balding	2:13.50
1983	Fields of Spring	3	Paul Cook	Ian Balding	2:13.40
1984	La Colorada	3	Siegmar Klein	Heinz Jentzsch	2:13.40
1985	Swift and Sure	3	Brent Thomson	Barry Hills	2:12.40
1986	Singletta	3	Walter Swinburn	Michael Stoute	2:07.20
1987	Gondola	3	Peter Remmert	Hein Bollow	2:14.40
1988	Prairie Venus	3	Wolfgang Härtl	Uwe Ostmann	2:08.18
1989	Diana Dance	3	Michael Roberts	Peter Lautner	2:09.72
1990	Indica	3	Manfred Hofer	Raimund Prinzinger	2:07.80
1991	Palanga	3	Michael Roberts	Peter Rau	2:10.08
1992	Arastou	3	Andreas Helfenbein	Uwe Ostmann	2:07.71
1993	Ostwahl	3	Alan Bond	Peter Lautner	2:10.44
1994	Risen Raven	3	Andrasch Starke	Heinz Jentzsch	2:12.40
1995	Alpha City	3	Peter Schiergen	Heinz Jentzsch	2:24.70
1996	Wurftaube	3	Peter Schiergen	Harro Remmert	2:22.80
1997	Anna Thea	3	Torsten Mundry	Hans Blume	2:26.90
1998	Saperlipoupette	6	Thierry Gillet	Jehan Bertran de Balanda	2:18.09
1999	Catella	3	Andreas Suborics	Peter Schiergen	2:16.99
2000	Moonlady	3	Kevin Woodburn	Harro Remmert	2:28.45
2001	Abitara	5	Andreas Suborics	Andreas Wöhler	2:19.37
2002	Casanga	3	Andreas Suborics	Peter Schiergen	2:41.30
2003	Saldenschwinge	5	Terence Hellier	Andreas Schütz	2:29.84
2004	Vallera	3	Torsten Mundry	Uwe Ostmann	2:27.89
2005	Gonbarda	3	Andreas Boschert	Uwe Ostmann	2:20.61
2006	Wurfscheibe	4	Torsten Mundry	Peter Rau	2:21.05
2007	Avanti Polonia	3	Davy Bonilla	Peter Schiergen	2:26.28
2008	Lady Marian	3	Dominique Boeuf	Werner Baltromei	2:32.09
2009	Night Magic	3	Karoly Kerekes	Wolfgang Figge	2:19.44
2010	Miss Starlight	3	Terence Hellier	Charlie McBride	2:21.27
2011	Karsabruni	3	Fabrice Veron	Henri-Alex Pantall	2:26.29
2012	Salomina	3	Andrasch Starke	Peter Schiergen	2:20.61
2013	Daytona Bay	3	Lennart Hammer-Hansen	Ferdinand J Leve	2:19.08
2014	Papagena Star	3	Andreas Helfenbein	Markus Klug	2:24.30
2015	Anna Katharina	3	Andreas Helfenbein	Markus Klug	2:19.59
2016	Near England	3	Andreas Helfenbein	Markus Klug	2:43.61
2017	Lacazar	3	Andrasch Starke	Peter Schiergen	2:29.73
2018	Taraja	3	Bauyrzhan Murzabayev	Henk Grewe	2:20.74
2019	Durance	3	Andrasch Starke	Peter Schiergen	2:22.94
2020	Virginia Joy	3	Adrie de Vries	Marcel Weiss	2:23.40
2021	Sconset	3	Bauyrzhan Murzabayev	Peter Schiergen	2:24.43
2022	Well Disposed	3	Hollie Doyle	Markus Klug	2:21.64
2023	Princess Zelda	3	Lukas Delozier	Henk Grewe	2:20.12
2024	Princess Badee	3	Michael Cadeddu	Christian Sprengel	2:26.37
2025	Nyra	3	Thore Hammer Hansen	Waldemar Hickst	2:23.45
2026	Soreanga	3	Eduardo Pedroza	Andreas Wöhler	2:27.49

== Earlier winners ==
- 1952: Jana
- 1953: Gisa
- 1954: Imola
- 1955: Lustige
- 1956: Nadia
- 1957: Thila
- 1958: Andrea
- 1959: Andrea
- 1960: Santa Cruz
- 1961: Meraviglia
- 1962: Ghana
- 1963: Ostsee
- 1964: Tauchente
- 1965: Tigerin
- 1966: Ordenstreue
- 1967: On Dit
- 1968: Ordinanz
- 1969: Inga
- 1970: Colima
- 1971: Monteria
- 1972: Ankerwinde
- 1973: Sheba
- 1974: Little Slam
- 1975: Idrissa
- 1976: Princess Eboli
- 1977: Contenance
- 1978: Indian Pearl

== See also ==
- List of German flat horse races
- Recurring sporting events established in 1952 – this race is included under its former title, Neusser Stutenpreis.
