= Schwarzgold-Rennen =

- Class: Group 3
- Location: Köln-Weidenpesch; Cologne, Germany
- Inaugurated: 2008
- Race type: Flat / Thoroughbred
- Website: Köln-Weidenpesch

Race information
- Distance: 1,600 metres (1 mile)
- Surface: Turf
- Track: Right-handed
- Qualification: Three-year-old fillies
- Weight: 58 kg
- Purse: €55,000 (2022); 1st: €32,000

The Schwarzgold-Rennen is a Group 3 flat horse race in Germany open to three-year-old thoroughbred fillies. It is run over a distance of 1,600 metres (about 1 mile) at Cologne in May.

== History ==
The event is named after Schwarzgold, a filly whose victories included the Preis der Diana and Deutsches Derby in 1940. "Schwarzgold-Rennen" is a previous title of several other races, including the German 1,000 Guineas (1941–88), the Hamburger Stutenmeile (1995–98) and the Diana-Trial (2004–07).

The present Schwarzgold-Rennen, a trial for the German 1,000 Guineas, was introduced in 2008. It replaced the Kölner Herbst-Stuten-Meile, an autumn race for fillies and mares aged three or older.

Since 2010, the race is run in memory of Baroness Karin von Ullmann, a former owner of Gestüt Schlenderhan, who died in 2009.

== Records ==
Leading jockey (4 wins):

- Eduardo Pedroza - Prakasa (2010), Delectation (2017), Axana (2019), Lady Ewelina (2023)

Leading trainer (6 wins):

- Andreas Wohler - Peace Royale (2008), Meerjungfrau (2014), La Saldana (2015), Delectation (2017), Axana (2019) Lady Ewelina (2023)

== Winners ==
Year	Winner	Jockey	Trainer	Time
2008	Peace Royale	Andreas Suborics	Andreas Wöhler	1:37.79
2009	Addicted	Andreas Suborics	Torsten Mundry	1:38.03
2010	Prakasa	Eduardo Pedroza	Waldemar Hickst	1:36.64
2011	Djumama	Andreas Helfenbein	Andreas Löwe	1:39.20
2012	Survey	Terence Hellier	Mario Hofer	1:39.22
2013	Beatrice	Fabrice Veron	Henri-Alex Pantall	1:36.31
2014	Meerjungfrau	Harry Bentley	Andreas Wohler	1:34.91
2015	La Saldana	Jozef Bojko	Andreas Wohler	1:36.22
2016	Parvaneh	Marc Lerner	Waldemar Hickst	1:36.98
2017	Delectation	Eduardo Pedroza	Andreas Wöhler	1:38.88
2018	Butzje	Andreas Helfenbein	Markus Klug	1:41.86
2019	Axana	Eduardo Pedroza	Andreas Wöhler	1:34.80
2020	No Limit Credit	Clement Lecoeuvre	Andreas Suborics	1:37.03
2021	Belcarra	Martin Seidl	Markus Klug	1:36.65
2022	Mountaha	Andrasch Starke	Markus Klug	1:37.01
2023	Lady Ewelina	Eduardo Pedroza	Andreas Wöhler	1:39.32
2024	Queues Likely	Billy Loughnane	Stan Moore	1:43.96
2025	Santagada	Leon Wolfff	P Schiergen	1:36.59
2026	Santa Catarina	Thore Hammer Hansen	Henk Grewe	1:35.97

== See also ==
- List of German flat horse races
