= German flat racing Champion Jockey =

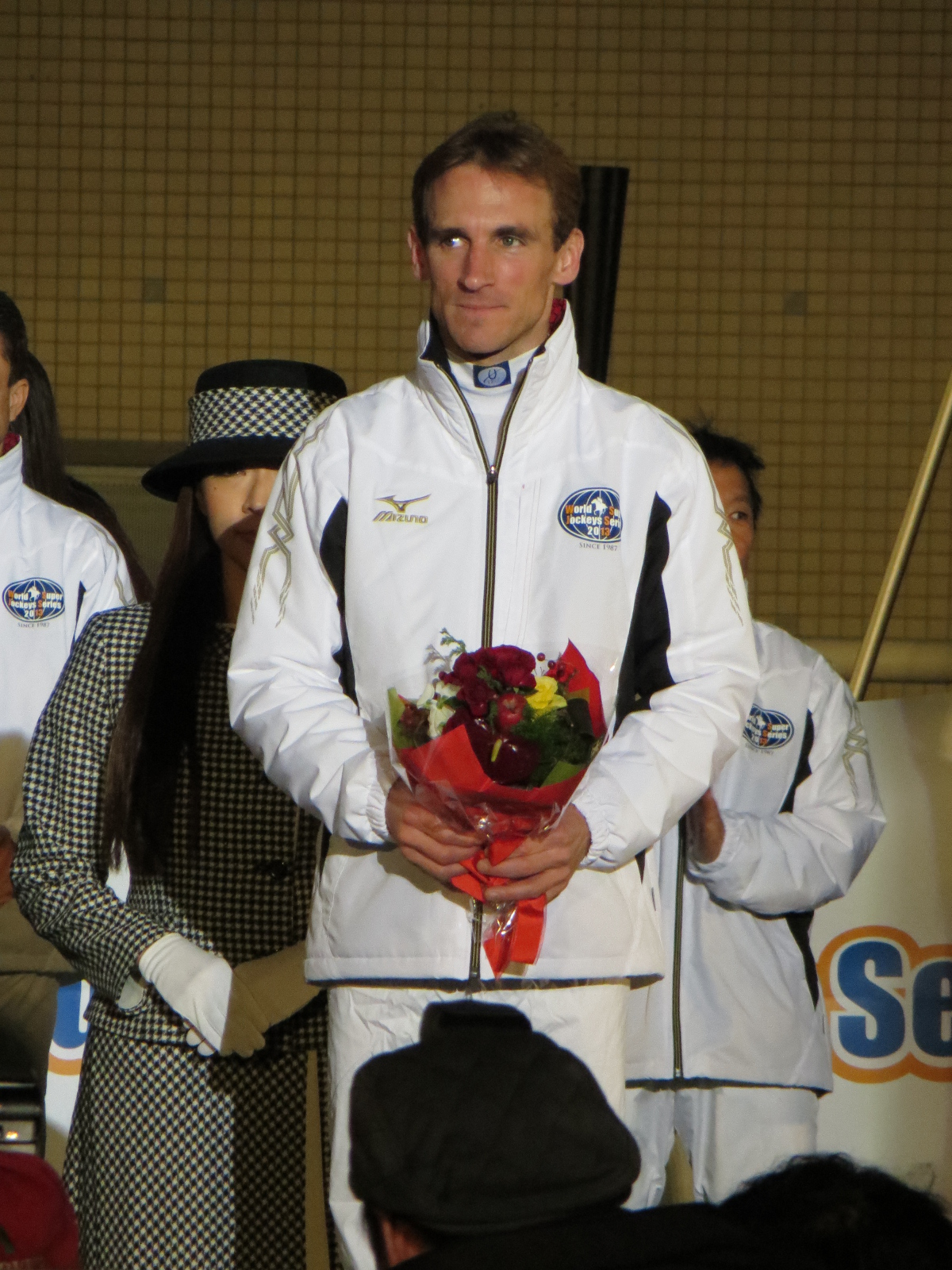
Andrasch Starke - 10 times winner

The Champion Jockey of flat racing in Germany is the jockey who has ridden the most winning horses during a season. The list of the Champion Jockey started 1870.

== Champion Jockey ==
- 2025: Thore Hammer-Hansen
- 2024 Thore Hammer-Hansen
- 2023 Andrasch Starke
- 2022 Bauyrzhan Murzabayev
- 2021 Bauyrzhan Murzabayev
- 2020 Bauyrzhan Murzabayev
- 2019 Bauyrzhan Murzabayev
- 2018 Andrasch Starke
- 2017 Filip Minarik and Alexander Pietsch
- 2016 Filip Minarik
- 2015 Alexander Pietsch and Andrasch Starke
- 2014 Adrie de Vries
- 2013 Andrasch Starke
- 2012 Andrasch Starke
- 2011 Filip Minarik
- 2010 Eduardo Pedroza
- 2009 Eduardo Pedroza
- 2008 Eduardo Pedroza
- 2007 Eduardo Pedroza
- 2006 Andreas Suborics
- 2005 Filip Minarik
- 2004 Andreas Suboric
- 2003 Andrasch Starke
- 2002 Andreas Suboric
- 2001 Andrasch Starke
- 2000 Andrasch Starke
- 1999 Andrasch Starke
- 1998 Andrasch Starke
- 1997 Kevin Woodburn
- 1996 Peter Schiergen
- 1995 Peter Schiergen
- 1994 Peter Schiergen
- 1993 Peter Schiergen
- 1992 Peter Schiergen
- 1991 Andrzej Tylicki
- 1989 Georg Bocskai
- 1988 Manfred Hofer
- 1987 Manfred Hofer
- 1986 Andrzej Tylicki
- 1985 Georg Bocskai
- 1984 Peter Alafi und Georg Bocskai
- 1969 Fritz Drechsler
- 1968 Peter Remmert
- 1967 Peter Remmert
- 1966 Oskar Langner
- 1965 Peter Remmert
- 1964 Horst Horwart
- 1963 Fritz Drechsler
- 1962 Peter Alafi
- 1961 Hein Bollow
- 1960 Hein Bollow
- 1959 Hein Bollow
- 1958 Hein Bollow
- 1957 Hein Bollow
- 1956 Hein Bollow
- 1955 Hein Bollow
- 1954 Walter Held
- 1953 Walter Held
- 1952 Hein Bollow
- 1951 Hein Bollow
- 1950 Hein Bollow
- 1949 Hein Bollow
- 1948 Hein Bollow
- 1947 Hein Bollow
- 1946 Hans Zehmisch
- 1945 Oskar Langner
- 1944 Hans Zehmisch
- 1943 Hans Zehmisch
- 1942 Hans Zehmisch
- 1941 Otto Schmidt
- 1940 Otto Schmidt
- 1939 Otto Schmidt
- 1938 M. Schmidt
- 1937 Hans Zehmisch
- 1936 Otto Schmidt
- 1935 Willi Printen
- 1934 Willi Printen
- 1933 Willi Printen
- 1932 Everett Haynes
- 1931 Ernst F. Grabsch
- 1930 Ernst F. Grabsch
- 1929 Ernst F. Grabsch
- 1928 Otto Schmidt
- 1927 Otto Schmidt
- 1926 Otto Schmidt
- 1925 Everett Haynes
- 1924 Otto Schmidt
- 1923 Otto Schmidt
- 1922 Otto Schmidt
- 1921 Anton Olejnik
- 1920 Otto Schmidt
- 1919 Otto Schmidt
- 1918 F. Kasper
- 1917 Albert Schlaefke
- 1916 George Archibald
- 1915 George Archibald
- 1914 George Archibald
- 1913 George Archibald
- 1912 Frank Bullock
- 1911 Frank Bullock
- 1910 F. Bullock
- 1909 Frank Bullock
- 1908 Frank Bullock
- 1907 Tommy Burns
- 1906 O'Connor
- 1905 H. Aylin
- 1904 W. Warne
- 1903 W. Warne
- 1902 E. Martin
- 1901 E. Martin und R. Utting
- 1900 R. Utting
- 1899 W. Warne
- 1898 W. Warne
- 1897 Ch. Ballantine
- 1896 W. Warne
- 1895 W. Warne
- 1894 Ch. Ballantine
- 1893 Ch. Ballantine
- 1892 Frank Sharpe
- 1891 Ch. Ballantine
- 1890 Ch. Ballantine
- 1889 Ch. Ballantine
- 1888 Ch. Ballantine
- 1887 Ch. Ballantine
- 1886 G. Sopp
- 1885 Harry Jeffery
- 1884 G. Sopp
- 1883 Harry Jeffery
- 1882 G. Sopp
- 1881 G. Sopp
- 1880 G. Sopp
- 1879 G. Sopp
- 1878 G. Sopp
- 1877 G. Sopp
- 1876 Whitheley
- 1875 E. Fisk, W. Little und G. Sopp
- 1874 Wilson
- 1873 G. Sopp
- 1872 Eric Madden
- 1871 Eric Madden
- 1870 Eric Madden

== See also ==
- German flat racing Champion Trainer
- British flat racing Champion Jockey
