= Grosser Preis von Bayern =

Flat horse race in Germany

- Class: Group 1
- Location: Munich Racecourse; Munich, Germany
- Inaugurated: 1957
- Race type: Flat / Thoroughbred

Race information
- Distance: 2,400 metres (1½ miles)
- Surface: Turf
- Track: Right-handed
- Qualification: Three-years-old and up
- Weight: 58 kg (3yo); 60 kg (4yo+); Allowances; 2 kg for fillies and mares
- Purse: €150,000 (2021); 1st: €95,000

The Grosser Preis von Bayern is a Group 1 flat horse race in Germany open to thoroughbreds aged three years or older. It is run at Munich Racecourse over a distance of 2,400 metres (about 1½ miles), and it is scheduled to take place each year in early November.

== History ==
The event, established in 1957, was originally held at Gelsenkirchen and was called the Aral-Pokal. The first three runnings were contested over 2,600 metres, and it was cut to 2,400 metres in 1960.

The present system of race grading was introduced in Germany in 1972, and the Aral-Pokal was initially classed at Group 2 level. It was promoted to Group 1 status in 1973.

The race became known as the Grosser Erdgas-Preis in 1998. It was transferred to Cologne in 2001, and from this point till 2003 was titled the Credit Suisse Private Banking Pokal. It was renamed the Rheinland-Pokal, after the Rhineland region, in 2004. In 2012 it was transferred to Munich racecourse and renamed the Grosser Preis von Bayern. In 2014 it was moved from mid-August to its current slot in November.

== Records ==
Most successful horse (2 wins):

- Luciano – 1967, 1968
- Athenagoras – 1973, 1974
- Wladimir – 1977, 1978
- Wauthi – 1980, 1981
- Acatenango – 1985, 1986
- Mondrian – 1989, 1990
- Luso – 1996, 1998
- Guignol - 2016, 2017

Leading jockey (4 wins):

- Oskar Langner – Andalusier (1958), Kronzeuge (1965), Luciano (1967, 1968)
- Fritz Drechsler – Waidmannsheil (1960), Fontanus (1966), Alpenkönig (1970), Basalt (1971)
- Peter Remmert – Mercurius (1963), Wauthi (1981), Solo (1983), Kondor (1987)
- Filip Minarik - Temida (2012), Ivanhowe (2014), Ito (2015), Guignol (2017)

Leading trainer (10 wins):

- Sven von Mitzlaff – Andalusier (1958), Kronzeuge (1965), Luciano (1967, 1968), Athenagoras (1973, 1974), Kandia (1976), Königsstuhl (1979), Orofino (1982), Las Vegas (1984)

Leading owner (6 wins):

- Gestüt Schlenderhan - Alpenkonig (1970), Arratos (1972), Catella (2000), Wiener Waltzer (2009), Ivanhowe (2014), Ito (2015)

== Winners ==
Year	Winner	Age	Jockey	Trainer	Owner	Time
1957	Thila	3	Alfred Lommatzsch	Reinhold Vaas	Walter Eichholz	2:58.20
1958	Andalusier	4	Oskar Langner	Sven von Mitzlaff	Stutteri Scarlett	2:45.00
1959	Vierzehnender	3	Johannes Starosta	Johannes Kuhr	Gestüt Ravensberg	2:47.50
1960	Waidmannsheil	3	Fritz Drechsler	Johannes Kuhr	Gestüt Ravensberg	2:34.60
1961	Opponent	3	Peter Alafi	Josef Hochstein	Mrs N. Thissen	2:28.30
1962	Windbruch	5	Johannes Starosta	Johannes Kuhr	Gestüt Ravensberg	2:37.10
1963	Mercurius	3	Peter Remmert	Friedrich W. Schlaefke	W. Möller	2:32.50
1964	Spielhahn	5	Johannes Starosta	Johannes Kuhr	Gestüt Ravensberg	2:36.20
1965	Kronzeuge	4	Oskar Langner	Sven von Mitzlaff	Gestüt Zoppenbroich	2:41.20
1966	Fontanus	5	Fritz Drechsler	W. Schulz	W. Kamphausen	2:37.20
1967	Luciano	3	Oskar Langner	Sven von Mitzlaff	Stall Primerose	2:34.60
1968	Luciano	4	Oskar Langner	Sven von Mitzlaff	Stall Primerose	2:30.90
1969	Akari	3	Joe Mercer	Arthur-Paul Schlaefke	Gestüt Ebbesloh	2:34.40
1970	Alpenkönig	3	Fritz Drechsler	Heinz Jentzsch	Gestüt Schlenderhan	2:38.80
1971	Basalt	5	Fritz Drechsler	Heinz Jentzsch	Gestüt Bona	2:35.80
1972	Arratos	3	Joan Pall	Heinz Jentzsch	Gestüt Schlenderhan	2:28.80
1973	Athenagoras	3	Harro Remmert	Sven von Mitzlaff	Gestüt Zoppenbroich	2:28.10
1974	Athenagoras	4	Harro Remmert	Sven von Mitzlaff	Gestüt Zoppenbroich	2:26.80
1975	Lord Udo	4	Joe Mercer	Theo Grieper	Gestüt Röttgen	2:35.80
1976	Kandia	4	Erwin Schindler	Sven von Mitzlaff	Renate von Mitzlaff	2:28.30
1977	Wladimir	5	Horst Horwart	Robert Backes	Angela Spaulding	2:42.30
1978	Wladimir	6	Horst Horwart	Robert Backes	Angela Spaulding	2:29.70
1979	Königsstuhl	3	Peter Alafi	Sven von Mitzlaff	Gestüt Zoppenbroich	2:34.90
1980	Wauthi	3	Heinz-Peter Ludewig	Theo Grieper	Gestüt Röttgen	2:33.30
1981	Wauthi	4	Peter Remmert	Theo Grieper	Gestüt Röttgen	2:32.70
1982	Orofino	4	Peter Alafi	Sven von Mitzlaff	Gestüt Zoppenbroich	2:35.70
1983	Solo	3	Peter Remmert	Theo Grieper	Gestüt Röttgen	2:29.70
1984	Las Vegas	3	Pat Gilson	Sven von Mitzlaff	Stall Gamshof	2:29.70
1985	Acatenango	3	Andrzej Tylicki	Heinz Jentzsch	Gestüt Fährhof	2:43.30
1986	Acatenango	4	Georg Bocskai	Heinz Jentzsch	Gestüt Fährhof	2:33.10
1987	Kondor	3	Peter Remmert	Hein Bollow	Ilse Ramm	2:34.90
1988	Almaarad	5	Steve Cauthen	John Dunlop	Hamdan Al Maktoum	2:33.35
1989	Mondrian	3	Kevin Woodburn	Uwe Stoltefuss	Stall Hanse	2:32.78
1990	Mondrian	4	Manfred Hofer	Uwe Stoltefuss	Stall Hanse	2:31.60
1991	Indica	4	Kevin Woodburn	Raimund Prinzinger	Reinhold Lockmann	2:37.50
1992	Tel Quel	4	Michael Kinane	André Fabre	Sheikh Mohammed	2:40.50
1993	Monsun (Note: George Augustus finished first in 1993, but he was relegated to second place following a stewards' inquiry)	3	Michael Kinane	Heinz Jentzsch	Georg von Ullmann	2:36.10
1994	River North	4	Kevin Darley	Lady Herries	Peter Savill	2:33.73
1995	Wind in Her Hair	4	Richard Hills	John Hills	Diane Nagle	2:36.00
1996	Luso	4	Michael Kinane	Clive Brittain	Saeed Manana	2:32.98
1997	Caitano	3	Andrasch Starke	Bruno Schütz	Stall Blauer Reiter	2:29.82
1998	Luso	6	Darryll Holland	Clive Brittain	Darley Stud	2:31.00
1999	Ungaro	5	Andrasch Starke	Hans Blume	Gestüt Röttgen	2:38.94
2000	Catella	4	Terence Hellier	Peter Schiergen	Gestüt Schlenderhan	2:33.34
2001	Sabiango	3	Andreas Suborics	Andreas Wöhler	Gestüt Fährhof	2:29.41
2002	Yavana's Pace	10	Keith Dalgleish	Mark Johnston	Joan Keaney	2:32.06
2003	Dai Jin	3	Olivier Peslier	Andreas Schütz	WH Sport International	2:28.53
2004	Albanova	5	Terence Hellier	Sir Mark Prescott	Kirsten Rausing	2:30.80
2005	Darsalam	4	Terence Hellier	Arslangirej Savujev	Stall Turan	2:43.24
2006	Cherry Mix	5	Kerrin McEvoy	Saeed bin Suroor	Godolphin	2:28.25
2007	Saddex	4	Torsten Mundry	Peter Rau	Stall Avena	2:30.70
2008	Kamsin (Note: Oriental Tiger was first in 2008, but he was subsequently disqualified after testing positive for a banned substance)	3	Andrasch Starke	Peter Schiergen	Stall Blankenese	2:26.76
2009	Wiener Walzer	3	Fredrik Johansson	Jens Hirschberger	Gestüt Schlenderhan	2:29.89
2010	Campanologist	5	Adrie de Vries	Saeed bin Suroor	Godolphin	2:40.81
2011	Earl of Tinsdal	3	Eduardo Pedroza	Andreas Wöhler	Sunrace Stables	2:35.29
2012	Temida	4	Filip Minarik	Miltcho Mintchev	Litex Commerce Ad	2:26.83
2013	Seismos	5	Andrea Atzeni	Andreas Wohler	Gestut Karlhof	2:33.20
2014	Ivanhowe	4	Filip Minarik	Jean-Pierre Carvalho	Gestüt Schlenderhan	2:38.33
2015	Ito	4	Filip Minarik	Jean-Pierre Carvalho	Gestüt Schlenderhan	2:36.40
2016	Guignol	4	Michael Cadeddu	Jean-Pierre Carvalho	Stall Ullman	2:37.42
2017	Guignol	5	Filip Minarik	Jean-Pierre Carvalho	Stall Ullman	2:37.83
2018	Iquitos	6	Eddy Hardouin	Hans-Jurgen Groschel	Stall Mulligan	2:37.80
2019	Nancho	4	Bayarsaikhan Ganbat	Gabor Maronka	Intergaj	2:41.90
2020	Sunny Queen	3	Rene Piechulek	Henk Grewe	Cayton Park Stud Ltd	2:40.94
2021	Alpinista	4	Luke Morris	Sir Mark Prescott	Kirsten Rausing	2:38.53
2022	Tunnes	3	Bauyrzhan Murzabayev	Peter Schiergen	Holger Renz	2:44.33
2023	Junko	4	Bauyrzhan Murzabayev	André Fabre	Wertheimer et Frère	2:47.06
2024	Assistant	5	Thore Hammer-Hansen	Henk Grewe	Eckhard Sauren	2:37.46
2025	Bay City Roller	3	Adrie de Vries	George Scott	Victorious Forever	2:38.13
2026	Santagada	4	Bauyrzhan Murzabayev	Peter Schiergen	Gestut Park Wiedingen	2:35.41

== See also ==
- List of German flat horse races
- Recurring sporting events established in 1957 – this race is included under its original title, Aral-Pokal.
