= Nereide (horse) =

German-bred Thoroughbred racehorse

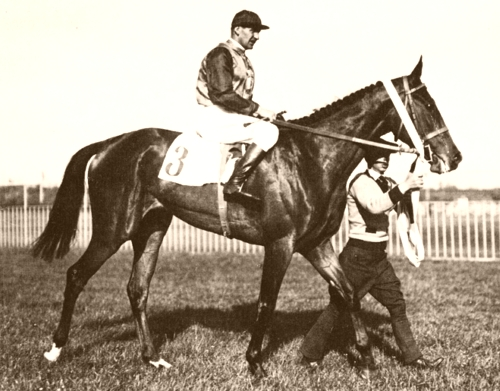
- Sire: Laland
- Grandsire: Fels
- Dam: Nella da Gubbio (ITY)
- Damsire: Grand Parade (GB)
- Sex: Mare
- Foaled: 1933
- Country: Germany
- Colour: Bay or brown
- Breeder: Gestut Erlenhof
- Owner: Gestut Erlenhof
- Trainer: Adrian von Borcke
- Record: 10 starts, 10 wins
- Earnings: RM 178,500

Major wins
- 1936 German Derby; 1936 German Oaks

Honours
- Nereide race
- Last updated on 1 September 2010

Nereide (1933 – 22 April 1943 ) was an undefeated Thoroughbred racemare that won the 1936 German Derby (in track record time) and the 1936 German Oaks.

== Breeding ==
She was foaled in 1933 on the stud of Erlenhof in Germany. Nereide was by the German sire, Laland, her dam was the Federico Tesio owned mare, Nella da Gubbio (ITY) by The Derby winner, Grand Parade (GB) from Nera di Bicci (GB) (dam of Neroccia (ITY), won 1926 Italian Oaks) by Tracery (USA). The third dam of Nereide was Catnip (IRE) (who was second dam of the undefeated Nearco, and a daughter of Spearmint and Sibola). Catnip was in England during World War I and went to Dormello stud in Italy in 1918, with her Tracery foal, Nera di Bicci (GB). These mares and their progeny belong to the Bruce Lowe number 4-r family.

== Racing record ==
Even as a two-year Nereide acquired a reputation as a good filly and won everything she contested. In the history of German Thoroughbred breeding, there were several similarly successful two-year-old fillies, but Nereide was the only one who was able to continue their triumphant advance as a three-year-old.

In the German Derby Periander set a very fast pace but in the home stretch Nereide made short work of the finish by defeating Periander. In winning this race Nereide set a new record of 2:28.8, which was not beaten until 1993 by Lando. The Derby record time shows that Nereide’s superiority was based on the weakness of the competition but on their own strength.

Nereid won the Baraunes Band von Deutschland in Munich by defeating the exceptional French mare, Corrida. Charles Elliot, the rider of the defeated Corrida said after the race, that in Europe probably would be no second horse that could win against her. Corrida a short time later won the Prix de l'Arc de Triomphe, and repeated the victory the following year.

Nereide’s trainer, Adrian von Borcke who managed seven Derby winners for the stud Erlenhof, among them exceptional horses such as Ticino and Orsini said, at the end of his career that Nereide was the best horse he had ever trained.

== Stud record ==
Nereide's pedigree indicated great potential, but the Second World War and bad luck in general saw to it that Nereide’s blood is not found today in the German Thoroughbred breeding any more. Nereide was mated with only the best stallions of her time and she had three registered foals:

- Nuvolari 1938 colt by stakes-winning Oleander. Successful sire.
- Nordlicht 1941 colt by Oleander (unbeaten, 1944 German Derby and Austrian Derby, sire, exported to USA and sold at auction by the Army Remount Service in Virginia for $20,300 to a syndicate). After the war, there were intensive efforts to reclaim Nordlicht, at least on loan from the U.S. back again to revive the German Thoroughbred breeding industry. All these efforts failed and he died in 1968 in the U.S. without seeing Germany again.
- Nerepha 1943 filly by Pharis II (FR), had a stakes-winning gelding and another son that did not serve at stud.

Nereid had experienced World War II and died on 22 April 1943 during the birth of a foal.

== Honours ==
Nereid was honoured with a race which was held for mares since 1955, the Nereid race on the racetrack in Gelsenkirchen, Germany. Following the closure of the track Gelsenkirchen was first published this list of races to Mülheim and has been held since 2003 in Munich.

== See also ==
- List of leading Thoroughbred racehorses
