= Preis der Diana =

Preis der Diana Deutsches Stuten-Derby (German Oaks)
- Class: Group 1
- Location: Düsseldorf Racecourse; Düsseldorf, Germany
- Inaugurated: 1857
- Race type: Flat / Thoroughbred
- Sponsor: Henkel
- Website: Düsseldorf

Race information
- Distance: 2,200 metres (1m 3f)
- Surface: Turf
- Track: Right-handed
- Qualification: Three-year-old fillies
- Weight: 58 kg
- Purse: €500,000 (2022); 1st: €300,000

Preis der Diana
2021
| Palmas | Isfahani | Noble Heidi |

Previous years
2020
Miss Yoda | Zamrud | Virginia Joy
2019
Diamanta | Naida | Durance
2018
Well Timed | Night Of England | Wonder Of Lips
2017
Lacazar | Megera | Wuheida
2016
Serienholde | Sarandia | Architecture
2015
Turfdonna | Nightflower | Amona
2014
Feodora | Diamond Dove | Longina
2013
Penelopa | Secret Gesture | Adoya
2012
Salomina | Nymphea | Waldtraut
2011
Dancing Rain | Djumama | Aigrette Garzette

2010–2001
2010
Enora | Elle Shadow | Nicea
2009
Night Magic | Soberania | Andrea
2008
Rosenreihe | Lady Marian | Baila Me
2007
Mystic Lips | Dominante | Avanti Polonia
2006
Almerita | Karavel | Nordtanzerin
2005
Iota | North Queen | Indigo Girl
2004
Amarette | La Ina | Saldentigerin

The Preis der Diana is a Group 1 flat horse race in Germany open to three-year-old thoroughbred fillies. It is run at Düsseldorf over a distance of 2,200 metres (about 1 mile and 3 furlongs), and takes place in early August each year.

It is Germany's equivalent of The Oaks, a famous race in England.

== History ==
The event was established in 1857, and it was originally contested at Tempelhof over 2,000 metres. It was transferred to Hoppegarten in 1868.

The race was staged at Grunewald for a short period after World War I, and it returned to Hoppegarten in 1923. It was abandoned in 1945 and 1946, and it took place at Düsseldorf in 1947. It began a long period at Mülheim in 1948.

The present system of race grading was introduced in Germany in 1972, and the Preis der Diana was initially classed at Group 2 level. Its distance was extended to 2,100 metres in 1973, and to 2,200 metres in 1977.

The Preis der Diana was promoted to Group 1 status in 2001. It was held at Hamburg in 2004 and 2005, and it moved to Düsseldorf in 2006. It was switched to early August in 2008, having taken place previously in late May or early June.

== Records ==
Leading jockey (6 wins):

- Andrasch Starke – Night Petticoat (1996), Elle Danzig (1998), Flamingo Road (1999), Next Gina (2003), Rosenreihe (2008), Lacazar (2017)

Leading trainer (11 wins):

- Heinz Jentzsch – Brisanz (1962), Sabera (1964), Indra (1965), Schönbrunn (1969), Idrissa (1975), Leticia (1980), Slenderella (1984, dead-heat), Padang (1985), Comprida (1986), Longa (1992), Risen Raven (1994)

(note: the trainers of some of the early winners are unknown)

Leading owner (16 wins):

- Hauptgestüt Graditz – Das Veilchen (1871), Vergissmeinnicht (1876), Glocke (1883), Hildburg (1885), Närrin (1887), Glöcknerin (1890), Forelle (1892), Waschfrau (1895), Pfaueninsel (1897), Waldkatze (1908), Angostura (1911), Adresse (1916), Alpenrose (1922), Stromschnelle (1930), Sichel (1931), Landmädel (1937)

== Winners since 1969 ==
| Year | Winner | Jockey | Trainer | Owner | Time |
|---|---|---|---|---|---|
| 1969 | Schönbrunn | Peter Kienzler | Heinz Jentzsch | Gestüt Schlenderhan | 2:15.00 |
| 1970 | Gerona | Bill Williamson | H. Danner | Gestüt Römerhof | 2:09.00 |
| 1971 | Kockpitt | Peter Remmert | Hein Bollow | Gestüt Asta | 2:13.20 |
| 1972 | Diu | Greville Starkey | Theo Grieper | Gestüt Röttgen | 2:06.90 |
| 1973 | Oraza | W. Wickert | Georg Zuber | Stall Rosenau | 2:17.70 |
| 1974 | Loisach | Harro Remmert | Sven von Mitzlaff | Stall Gamshof | 2:14.70 |
| 1975 | Idrissa | Joan Pall | Heinz Jentzsch | Gestüt Schlenderhan | 2:13.50 |
| 1976 | Princess Eboli | Jerzy Jednaszewski | Hein Bollow | Countess Batthyany | 2:13.30 |
| 1977 | Friedrichsruh | Peter Alafi | Sven von Mitzlaff | Gestüt Zoppenbroich | 2:26.60 |
| 1978 | Trient | Paul Cook | Sven von Mitzlaff | Oettingen-Wallerstein | 2:24.30 |
| 1979 | Alaria | Michael Rath | Georg Zuber | Stall Weissenhof | 2:23.50 |
| 1980 | Leticia | Peter Remmert | Heinz Jentzsch | Gestüt Fährhof | 2:25.90 |
| 1981 | Anna Paola | Peter Remmert | Theo Grieper | Gestüt Röttgen | 2:20.20 |
| 1982 | Ultima Ratio | Peter Alafi | Sven von Mitzlaff | Gestüt Erlengrund | 2:19.40 |
| 1983 | Novelle | Peter Alafi | Sven von Mitzlaff | Gestüt Erlengrund | 2:23.20 |
| 1984 (dh) | Las Vegas; Slenderella | Pat Gilson; Georg Bocskai | Sven von Mitzlaff; Heinz Jentzsch | Stall Gamshof; Gestüt Schlenderhan | 2:31.40 |
| 1985 | Padang | Georg Bocskai | Heinz Jentzsch | Gestüt Fährhof | 2:18.40 |
| 1986 | Comprida | Andrzej Tylicki | Heinz Jentzsch | Gestüt Fährhof | 2:30.30 |
| 1987 | Majorität | Ralf Suerland | Hein Bollow | Gestüt Erlengrund | 2:30.10 |
| 1988 | Alte Zeit | Peter Remmert | Hein Bollow | Stall Mühlengrund | 2:19.52 |
| 1989 | Filia Ardross | Lutz Mäder | Bruno Schütz | Dr Klaus Rohde | 2:25.17 |
| 1990 | Highness Lady | Mark Rimmer | Bruno Schütz | Stall Ventura | 2:25.71 |
| 1991 | Martessa | Terence Hellier | Andreas Wöhler | Gestüt Hof Heidendom | 2:23.68 |
| 1992 | Longa | Andrzej Tylicki | Heinz Jentzsch | Gestüt Fährhof | 2:27.57 |
| 1993 | Arkona | Olaf Schick | Hans Blume | Gestüt Ebbesloh | 2:23.91 |
| 1994 | Risen Raven | Peter Schiergen | Heinz Jentzsch | Gestüt Fährhof | 2:23.70 |
| 1995 | Centaine | Kevin Woodburn | Harro Remmert | Stauffenberg / Stoof | 2:21.36 |
| 1996 | Night Petticoat | Andrasch Starke | Bruno Schütz | Gestüt Wittekindshof | 2:31.80 |
| 1997 | Que Belle | Kevin Woodburn | Harro Remmert | Stall Stoof | 2:25.73 |
| 1998 | Elle Danzig | Andrasch Starke | Andreas Schütz | Gestüt Wittekindshof | 2:25.49 |
| 1999 | Flamingo Road | Andrasch Starke | Andreas Schütz | Helmut von Finck | 2:18.30 |
| 2000 | Puntilla | Alex. Brockhausen | Harro Remmert | Dirk von Mitzlaff | 2:18.14 |
| 2001 | Silvester Lady | Paul Johnson | Andreas Löwe | Stall Taunus | 2:32.31 |
| 2002 | Salve Regina | Richard Hills | Andreas Schütz | Gestüt Höny-Hof | 2:16.64 |
| 2003 | Next Gina | Andrasch Starke | Andreas Schütz | Gestüt Wittekindshof | 2:26.21 |
| 2004 | Amarette | Andreas Suborics | Andreas Schütz | Gestüt Schlenderhan | 2:20.24 |
| 2005 | Iota | Terence Hellier | Peter Schiergen | Gestüt Schlenderhan | 2:28.04 |
| 2006 | Almerita | Darryll Holland | Waldemar Hickst | Dr Christoph Berglar | 2:20.04 |
| 2007 | Mystic Lips | Andreas Helfenbein | Andreas Löwe | Stall Lintec | 2:16.31 |
| 2008 | Rosenreihe | Andrasch Starke | Peter Schiergen | Gestüt Wittekindshof | 2:19.32 |
| 2009 | Night Magic | Karoly Kerekes | Wolfgang Figge | Stall Salzburg | 2:15.34 |
| 2010 | Enora | Terence Hellier | Torsten Mundry | Gestüt Röttgen | 2:14.68 |
| 2011 | Dancing Rain | Kieren Fallon | William Haggas | Martin and Lee Taylor | 2:20.32 |
| 2012 | Salomina | Filip Minařík | Peter Schiergen | Gestut Bona | 2:15.73 |
| 2013 | Penelopa | Eduardo Pedroza | Miltcho Minchev | Litex Commerce Ad | 2:13.53 |
| 2014 | Feodora | Mirco Demuro | Andreas Wöhler | Gestut Etzean | 2:15.35 |
| 2015 | Turfdonna | Eduardo Pedroza | Andreas Wöhler | Australian Bloodstock | 2:13.93 |
| 2016 | Serienholde | Eduardo Pedroza | Andreas Wöhler | Gestut Wittekindshof | 2:14.49 |
| 2017 | Lacazar | Andrasch Starke | Peter Schiergen | Gestut Haus Zoppenbroich | 2:17.45 |
| 2018 | Well Timed | Filip Minařík | Jean-Pierre Carvalho | Stall Ullman | 2:12.63 |
| 2019 | Diamanta | Maxim Pecheur | Markus Klug | Gestut Brummerhof | 2:15.78 |
| 2020 | Miss Yoda | Frankie Dettori | John Gosden | Westerberg | 2:14.34 |
| 2021 | Palmas | Eduardo Pedroza | Andreas Wöhler | Gestut Etzean | 2:12.15 |
| 2022 | Toskana Belle | Kerrin McEvoy | Andreas Wöhler | Australian Bloodstock | 2:11.21 |
| 2023 | Muskoka | Lukas Delozier | Henk Grewe | Stall Golden Goal | 2:21.92 |
| 2024 | Erle | Martin Seidl | Maxim Pecheur | Gestut Rottgen | 2:14.00 |
| 2025 | Nicoreni | Leon Wolff | Peter Schiergen | Gestut Ebbesloh | 2:14.85 |
| 2026 | Soreanga | Eduardo Pedroza | Andreas Wöhler | Gestüt Fährhof | 2:12.42 |

== Earlier winners ==
- 1857: Sinope
- 1858: Lavant
- 1859: Isabella
- 1860: Margarethe
- 1861: Doloritha
- 1862: Fullsail
- 1863: Last Pippin
- 1864: Sweet Katie
- 1865: Emiliana
- 1866: La Stella
- 1867: Moawija
- 1868: Bessy Giles
- 1869: Lady Bird
- 1870: Caro Dame
- 1871: Das Veilchen
- 1872: Libelle
- 1873: Zwietracht
- 1874: Hamadryade
- 1875: Germania
- 1876: Vergissmeinnicht
- 1877: Chere Amie
- 1878: Altona
- 1879: Illona
- 1880: Mereny
- 1881: Dombrowa
- 1882: Flaminia
- 1883: Glocke
- 1884: Gabernie
- 1885: Hildburg
- 1886: Matutina
- 1887: Närrin
- 1888: Herzdame
- 1889: Eintracht
- 1890: Glöcknerin
- 1891: Zenobia
- 1892: Forelle
- 1893: Ilse
- 1894: Migräne
- 1895: Waschfrau
- 1896: Seemärchen
- 1897: Pfaueninsel
- 1898: Gudrun
- 1899: Hut Ab
- 1900: Ordonnanz
- 1901: Lore
- 1902: Eccola
- 1903: Belomantie
- 1904: Lucca
- 1905: Princess Heiling
- 1906: Ibidem
- 1907: Hochzeit
- 1908: Waldkatze
- 1909: Ladylike
- 1910: Letizia
- 1911: Angostura
- 1912: Einsicht
- 1913: Orchidee
- 1914: Mon Desir
- 1915: Amphora
- 1916: Adresse
- 1917: Ayesha
- 1918: Edderitz
- 1919: Tulipan
- 1920: Orla
- 1921: Himmelblau
- 1922: Alpenrose
- 1923: Falada
- 1924: Ostrea
- 1925: Melanie
- 1926: Note
- 1927: Libertas
- 1928: Aditja
- 1929: Antonia
- 1930: Stromschnelle
- 1931: Sichel
- 1932: Faienza
- 1933: Ausflucht
- 1934: Lehnsherrin
- 1935: Dornrose
- 1936: Nereide
- 1937: Landmädel
- 1938: Adlerfee
- 1939: Tatjana
- 1940: Schwarzgold
- 1941: Scilla
- 1942: Leibwache
- 1943: Contessa Pilade
- 1944: Yngola
- 1945–46: no race
- 1947: Königswiese
- 1948: Aralia
- 1949: Asterblüte
- 1950: Erlenkind
- 1951: Armgard
- 1952: Jana
- 1953: Naxos
- 1954: Wildbahn
- 1955: Lustige
- 1956: Liebeslied
- 1957: Thila
- 1958: Ivresse
- 1959: Sommerblume
- 1960: Santa Cruz
- 1961: Meraviglia
- 1962: Brisanz
- 1963: Lis
- 1964: Sabera
- 1965: Indra
- 1966: Ordenstreue
- 1967: On Dit
- 1968: Ipanema

== See also ==
- List of German flat horse races
