= German flat racing Champion Trainer =

Award for racehorse trainers in Germany

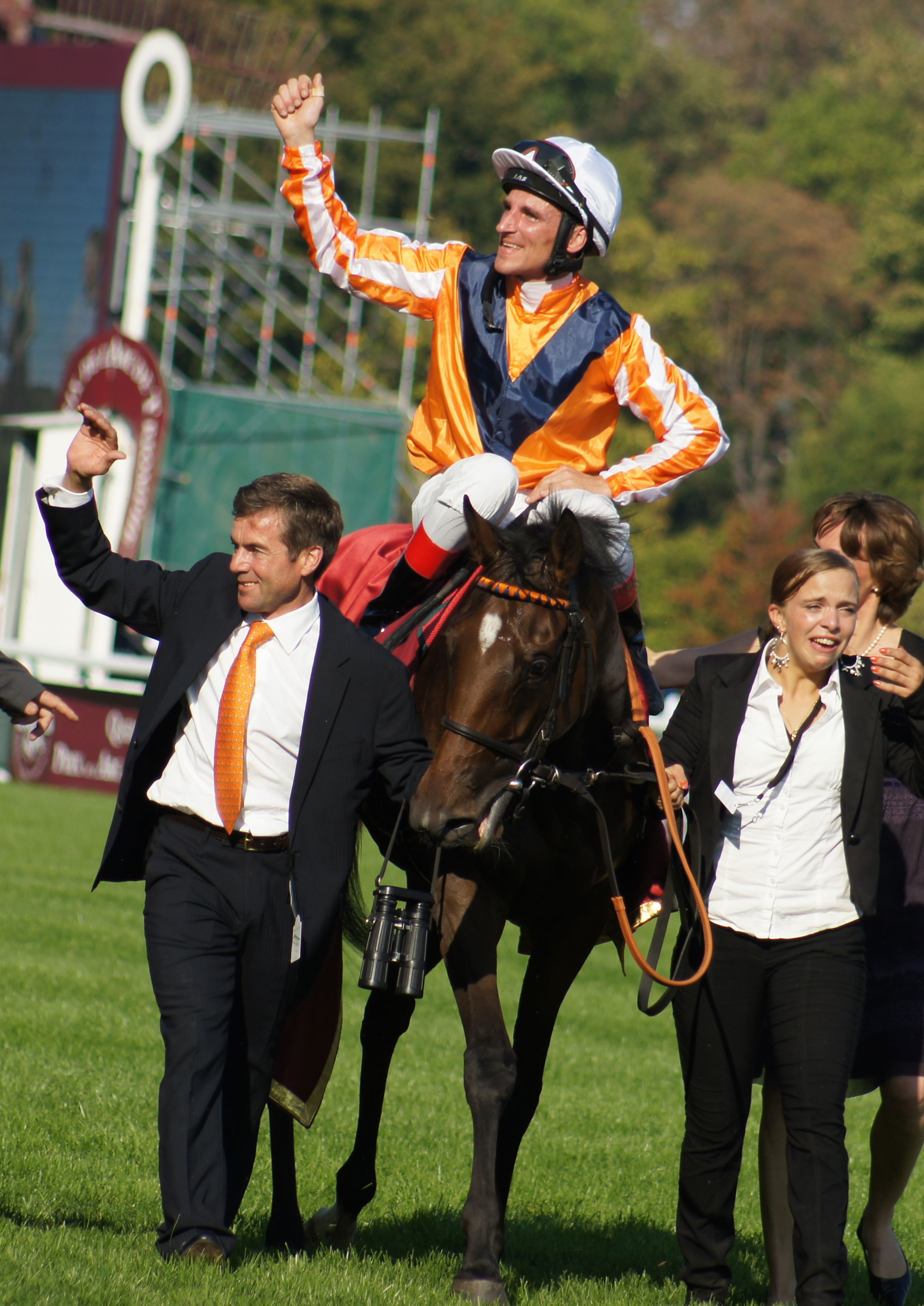
Schiergen (left) with Danedream after winning the 2011 Prix de l'Arc de Triomphe

The Champion Trainer of flat racing in Germany is the trainer whose horses have won the most flat races during a season.

== Champion Trainer (since 2003) ==
- 2025 Henk Grewe
- 2024 Peter Schiergen
- 2023 Peter Schiergen
- 2022 Peter Schiergen
- 2021 Peter Schiergen
- 2020 Henk Grewe
- 2019 Henk Grewe
- 2018 Markus Klug
- 2017 Markus Klug
- 2016 Markus Klug
- 2015 Andreas Wöhler und Peter Schiergen
- 2014 Markus Klug
- 2013 Peter Schiergen
- 2012 Roland Dzubasz
- 2011 Andreas Wöhler
- 2010 Christian Freiherr von der Recke
- 2009 Christian von der Recke
- 2008 Christian von der Recke
- 2007 Christian von der Recke
- 2006 Peter Schiergen
- 2005 Peter Schiergen
- 2004 Mario Hofer
- 2003 Andreas Schütz

== See also ==
- German flat racing Champion Jockey
