= Oaks d'Italia =

Flat horse race in Italy

- Class: Group 2
- Location: San Siro Racecourse; Milan, Italy
- Race type: Flat / Thoroughbred
- Website: San Siro

Race information
- Distance: 2,100 metres (1m 2½f)
- Surface: Turf
- Track: Right-handed
- Qualification: Three-year-old fillies
- Weight: 56 kg
- Purse: €285,000 (2020); 1st: €157,000

The Oaks d'Italia is a Group 2 flat horse race in Italy open to three-year-old thoroughbred fillies. It is run at Milan over a distance of 2,100 metres (about 1 mile and 2.5 furlongs), and it is scheduled to take place each year in May or June.

It is Italy's equivalent of The Oaks, a famous race in England.

== History ==
The event has been contested over 2,200 metres for most of its history, and for a period it held Group 1 status. Its distance was extended to 2,400 metres in 1988, it reverted to 2,200 metres in 1995 and reverted to 2,100 metres in 2025. The race was downgraded to Group 2 level in 2007.

The Oaks d'Italia is currently held about three weeks after the Derby Italiano.

== Records ==
Leading jockey since 1970 (5 wins):

- Fabio Branca - Cherry Collect (2012), Charity Line (2013), Final Score (2014), Lamaire (2019), Piccola Piuma (2026)

Leading trainer since 1985 (6 wins):

- Stefano Botti - Cherry Collect (2012), Charity Line (2013), Final Score (2014), Folega (2017), Shavasana (2023), Piccola Piuma (2026)

Leading owner since 1985 (3 wins):

- Effevi - Cherry Collect (2012), Charity Line (2013), Final Score (2014)

== Winners since 1985 ==
Year	Winner	Jockey	Trainer	Owner	Time
1985	Miss Gris	Willie Carson	Alduino Botti	Scuderia Siba	2:19.3
1986	Ivor's Image	Walter Swinburn	Michael Stoute	Sir Gordon White	2:17.7
1987	Lady Bentley	John Reid	Lester Piggott	Mohammed Suhail	2:17.5
1988	Melodist	Walter Swinburn	Michael Stoute	Sheikh Mohammed	2:33.8
1989	Nydrion	Marco Paganini	Lorenzo Brogi	Scuderia Cieffedi	2:30.8
1990	Atoll	Gary W. Moore	Barry Hills	Antonio Balzarini	2:28.9
1991	Possessive Dancer	Walter Swinburn	Alex Scott	Ahmed Al Maktoum	2:28.6
1992	Ivyanna	Christy Roche	Jim Bolger	Mrs Ogden White	2:29.8
1993	Bright Generation	Alan Munro	Paul Cole	Prince Fahd bin Salman	2:30.3
1994	Shahmiad	Fernando Jovine	Valfredo Valiani	Scuderia Magu	2:35.9
1995	Valley of Gold	Sylvain Guillot	André Fabre	Sheikh Mohammed	2:19.1
1996	Germignana	Marco Cangiano	Luigi Camici	Allevamento Gialloblu	2:18.9
1997	Nicole Pharly	Frankie Dettori	Alberto Verdesi	Scuderia Blue Horse	2:15.5
1998	Zomaradah	Walter Swinburn	Luca Cumani	M. Obaid Al Maktoum	2:23.5
1999	Nagoya	Fernando Jovine	Hans Blume	Gestüt Röttgen	2:13.8
2000	Timi	Mirco Demuro	Lorenzo Brogi	All. La Nuova Sbarra	2:16.1
2001	Zanzibar	Micky Fenton	Michael Bell	Gilly Rowland-Clark	2:16.5
2002	Guadalupe	Kieren Fallon	Peter Schiergen	Baron G. von Ullmann	2:17.3
2003	Meridiana	Andreas Suborics	Hans Blume	Stall Lucky Owner	2:15.4
2004	Menhoubah	Darryll Holland	Clive Brittain	Saeed Manana	2:15.1
2005	Gyreka	Adrie de Vries	Hans Blume	Gestüt Röttgen	2:15.7
2006	Dionisia	Christophe Soumillon	Riccardo Menichetti	Razza dell'Olmo	2:14.5
2007	Fashion Statement	Neil Callan	Michael Jarvis	Peter Savill	2:21.1
2008	Goose Bay	Andrasch Starke	Peter Schiergen	Gestüt Ebbesloh	2:20.3
2009	Night of Magic	Mirco Demuro	Horst Steinmetz	Stall Nizza	2:14.7
2010	Contredanse	Kieren Fallon	Luca Cumani	Stuart Stuckey	2:14.7
2011	Danedream	Andrasch Starke	Peter Schiergen	Gestüt Burg Eberstein	2:15.2
2012	Cherry Collect	Fabio Branca	Stefano Botti	Effevi	2:14.2
2013	Charity Line	Fabio Branca	Stefano Botti	Effevi	2:21.8
2014	Final score	Fabio Branca	Stefano Botti	Effevi	2:14.5
2015	Lovelyn	Robert Havlin	Peter Schiergen	Gestüt Ittlingen	2:16.5
2016	Nepal	Michael Cadeddu	Andreas Bolte	Stall Seseke	2:23.5
2017	Folega	Nicola Pinna	Stefano Botti	Scuderia Rencati Srl	2:13.7
2018	Sand Zabeel	Eduardo Pedroza	Andreas Wöhler	Jaber Abdullah	2:14.8
2019	Lamaire	Fabio Branca	Riccardo Santini	Razza Dormello Olgiata	2:13.5
2020	Auyantepui	Claudio Colombi	Nicolo Simondi	We Bloodstock Srl	2:18.00
2021	Eulaila	Dario Vargiu	Alduino Botti	Quafin Spa	2:14.10
2022	Nachtrose	Bauyrzhan Murzabayev	Peter Schiergen	Stall Nizza	2:12.20
2023	Shavasana	Hollie Doyle	Stefano Botti	Yoshida Katsumi	2:15.00
2024	Tomiko	Silvestre De Sousa	Paolo Aragoni	Luigi Ginobbi	2:18.30
2025	Klaynn	Cristian Demuro	Endo Botti	Teruya Yoshida	2:08.20
2026	Piccola Piuma	Fabio Branca	Stefano Botti	Jerome Sas & Elena Benvenutti	2:06.80

== Earlier winners ==
- 1910: Wistaria
- 1911: Desta
- 1912: Makufa
- 1913: Arianna
- 1914: Fausta
- 1915: Galliflora
- 1916: Juma
- 1917: Gianpietrina
- 1918: Stfadda
- 1919: Alcimaca
- 1920: Sissa
- 1921: Sorbita
- 1922: Anderina
- 1923: Giovanna Dupre
- 1924: Stella d'Italia
- 1925: Acacia Rosa
- 1926: Neroccia
- 1927: Francavilla
- 1928: Erba
- 1929: Ortona
- 1930: Ostiglia
- 1931: Alena
- 1932: Jacopa del Sellaio
- 1933: Dossa Dossi
- 1934: Bernina
- 1935: Mahatma
- 1936: Archidamia
- 1937: Amerina
- 1938: Silvana
- 1939: Ematina
- 1940: Michela
- 1941: Pallade
- 1942: Alemagna
- 1943: Fior d'Orchidea
- 1944: Nervesa
- 1945: Zamora
- 1946: Piavola
- 1947: Zambra
- 1948: Astolfina
- 1949: Samba
- 1950: La Cadette
- 1951: Staffa
- 1952: Ola
- 1953: Dacia
- 1954: Feira de Rio
- 1955: Theodorica
- 1956: La Canea
- 1957: Angela Rucellai
- 1958: Beatrice Adams
- 1959: Feria
- 1960: Caorlina
- 1961: Nuria
- 1962: Alibella
- 1963: Anticlea
- 1964: Alice Frey
- 1965: Tadolina
- 1966: Macrina d'Alba
- 1967: Dolina
- 1968: Soragna
- 1969: Raimonda da Capua
- 1970: Batavia
- 1971: Tingitana
- 1972: Kerkenna
- 1973: Orsa Maggiore
- 1974: Red Girl
- 1975: Carnauba
- 1976: Claire Valentine
- 1977: Zabarella
- 1978: Giustizia
- 1979: Maria Waleska
- 1980: Marmolada
- 1981: Val d'Erica
- 1982: Ilenia
- 1983: Right Bank
- 1984: Paris Royal

== See also ==
- List of Italian flat horse races
