= Bauyrzhan Murzabayev =

Kazakhstani jockey (born 1992)

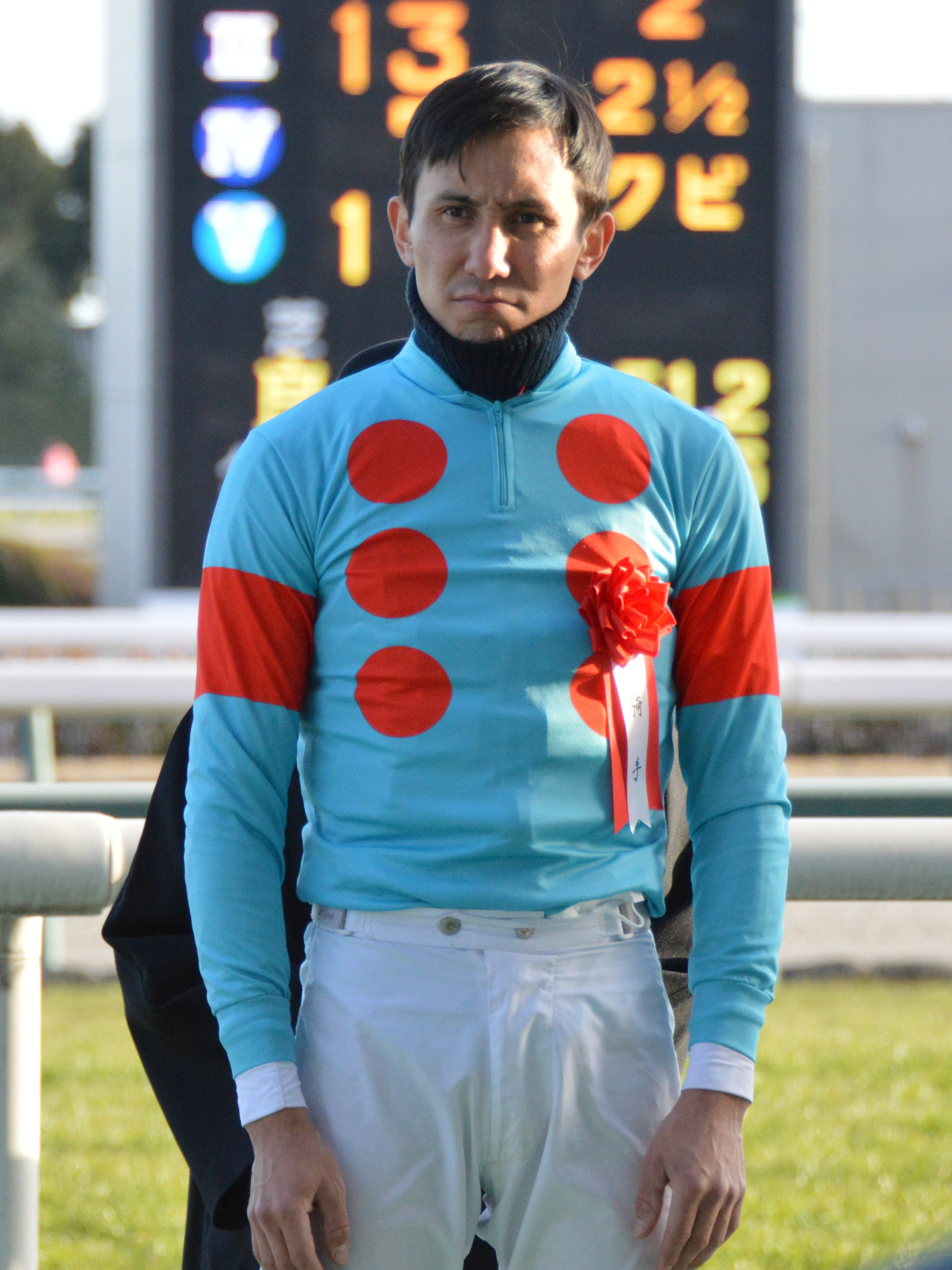
- Murzabayev in 2023

Personal information
- Native name: Бауыржан Мұрзабаев
- Nationality: Kazakhstani
- Born: 17 September 1992 (age 33) Almaty, Kazakhstan
- Height: 169 cm (5 ft 7 in)
- Weight: 54 kg (119 lb)

Horse racing career
- Sport: Horse racing

Bauyrzhan Murzabayev (Kazakh: Бауыржан Мұрзабаев, Bauyrjan Mūrzabaev; born September 17, 1992) is a Kazakhstani jockey currently active in France. He is the 4-time German flat racing Champion Jockey from 2019 to 2022.

== Overview ==
Murzabayev was born on September 17, 1992, in Almaty to a family that owned racehorses, which led him to grow an interest in horse racing. He first earned his jockey license in his native country in 2007 before moving to the Czech Republic, where he won the European Jockeys Cup in 2016 and 2018.

He started racing in Germany also, formerly employed by trainers Peter Schiergen and Andreas Wöhler. Under Schiergen, Murzabayev won the Deutsches Derby in 2022 as Sammarco's jockey. In 2023 Murzabayev was offered the prestigious job as one of André Fabre's stable jockeys which he accepted. In April 2023 Murzabayev moved to Chantilly to start his new job.

In addition to German and French racecourses, Murzabayev has also raced in Japan, with his first race being the 2022 Japan Cup, and marking his first major victory in Japan that same year by winning the Hopeful Stakes, while riding a 90–1 shot horse named Dura Erede.

== Major wins ==
Germany

- Deutsches Derby - (1) - Sammarco (2022)
- Grosser Preis von Bayern - (2) - Tunees (2022), Junko (2023)
- Preis des Winterfavoriten - (1) - Lifetimes (2024)

Italy

- Oaks d'Italia - (1) - Nachtrose (2022)

Japan

- Hopeful Stakes - (1) - Dura Erede (2022)
