= Hein Bollow =

German jockey

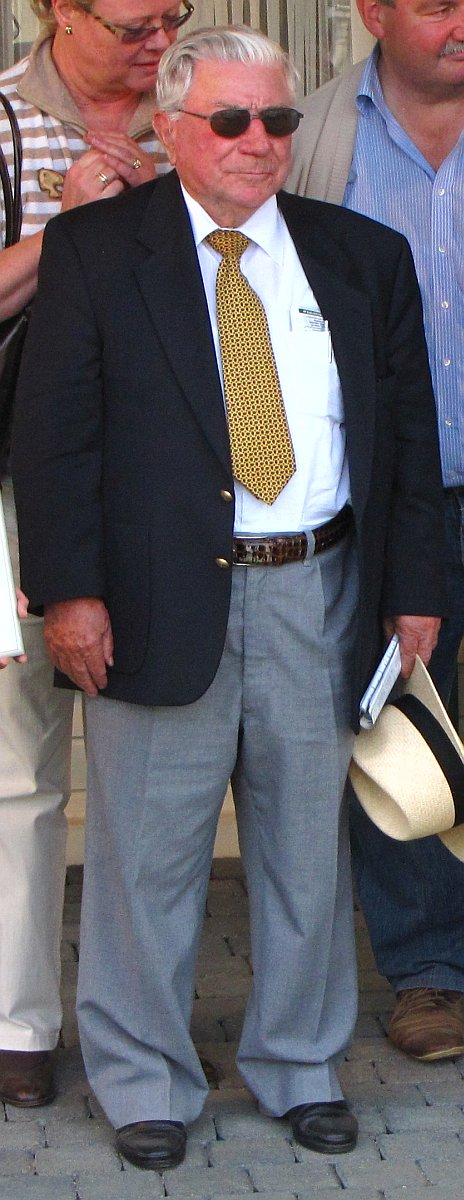
Hein Bollow in 2011

Heinrich “Hein” Bollow (5 December 1920 in Nienstedten – 20 April 2020 in Cologne) was a German jockey who was one of the most successful German trainers in German horse racing.

== Biography ==
Bollow completed his apprenticeship with trainer Anton "Pan" Horalek in Hoppegarten near Berlin. During his active career from 1936 to 1963, he achieved 1,033 victories, including four in the Deutschen Derby with Allasch (1953), Kaliber (1954), Kilometer (1956), and Herero (1962). Bollow won the German Jockey Championship thirteen times. He lived in Cologne from 1947 onwards.

His active career as a trainer lasted from 1963 to 1988. He achieved 1,661 victories, including a Derby victory at the Hamburg-Horn racecourse with Marduk (1974). In 1965, he achieved the only trainer's championship in continuous competition against his former vocational school colleague, the legendary trainer Heinz Jentzsch. Bollow was the first person to achieve more than 1,000 victories in horse racing, both in the saddle and as a trainer. For this reason, he has often been called a legend of horse racing.

He was a regular visitor to the Cologne-Weidenpesch racecourse at Weidenpescher Park until his final year. He ultimately lived in a retirement home near the racecourse.

Hein Bollow was admitted to hospital in mid-April 2020. He died on the 20th of that month in Cologne at the age of 99 from the effects of a stroke.

== Honours ==
- Bundesverdienstkreuz 1. Klasse (18 December 1975)
