= Rene Piechulek =

German flat racing jockey

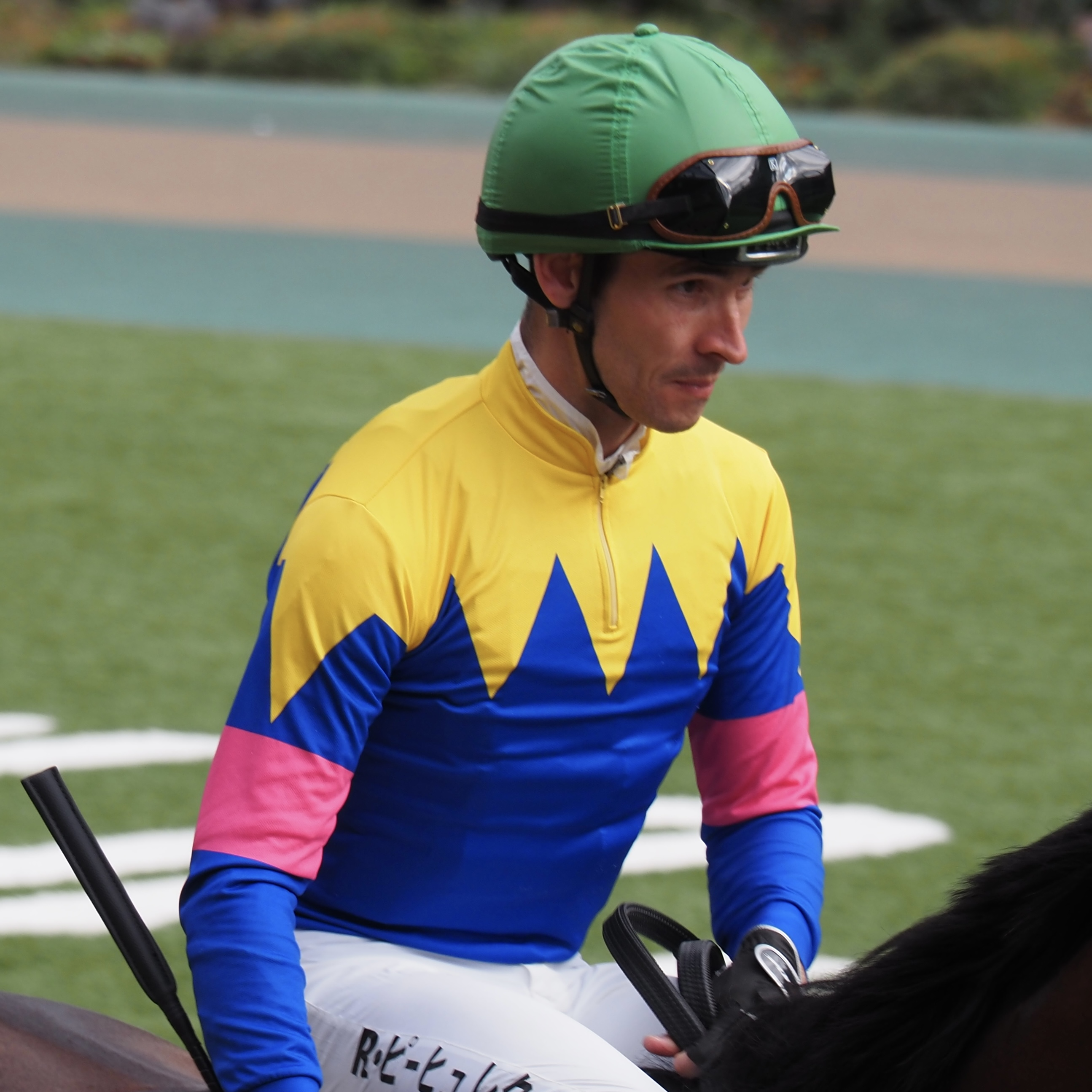
- Piechulek in 2024

Personal information
- Nationality: German
- Born: April 24, 1987 (age 39) Dessau, Dessau-Roßlau, Saxony-Anhalt, Germany
- Occupation: Jockey
- Height: 169 cm (5 ft 7 in)
- Weight: 54 kg (119 lb)

Horse racing career
- Sport: Horse racing

Rene Piechulek (born April 24, 1987) is a German flat racing jockey.

== Career ==
Piechulek earned his first jockey license in Germany in 2004.

In 2021, Piechulek won the Prix de l'Arc de Triomphe with Torquator Tasso. The riding crop he used in that race was a gift that Filip Minařík, who had recently retired at the time, gave to him from Japan.

In 2024, Piechulek came to Japan as a jockey for the first time, using the short-term license policy. (Note: Previously, he came to Japan as an assistant trainer for Ivanhowe and Ito, who raced in the Japan Cup in 2014 and 2015 each, respectively.) He secured his first victory in Japan after 32 starts, on January 14, when Roselle won R12 of the Nakayama Racecourse that day. He later won his first JRA graded race on February 4 when he won the Kisaragi Sho with Byzantine Dream. On February 16, the JRA announced that as of February 18 he would be cancelling his short-term license with the JRA due to personal reasons.

== Major wins ==
=== France ===
- Prix de l'Arc de Triomphe - Torquator Tasso (2021)

=== Germany ===
- Bayerisches Zuchtrennen - Sammarco (2022)
- Deutsches Derby - Fantastic Moon (2023)
- Grosser Preis von Baden - Torquator Tasso (2021), Mendocino (2022), Fantastic Moon (2024)
- Preis von Europa - India (2023)
