= Deutsches Derby =

- Class: Group 1
- Location: Horner Rennbahn; Hamburg, Germany
- Inaugurated: 1869
- Race type: Flat / Thoroughbred
- Sponsor: IDEE
- Website: Hamburg

Race information
- Distance: 2,400 metres (1½ miles)
- Surface: Turf
- Track: Right-handed
- Qualification: Three-year-olds excluding geldings
- Weight: 58 kg Allowances; 1½ kg for fillies
- Purse: €650,000 (2022); 1st: €390,000

Deutsches Derby
2021
Sisfahan	Alter Adler	Imi

Previous years
2020
In Swoop	Torquator Tasso	Grocer Jack
2019
Laccario	Django Freeman	Accon
2018
Weltstar	Destino	Royal Youmzain
2017
Windstoss	Enjoy Vijay	Rosenpurpur
2016
Isfahan	Savoir Vivre	Dschingis Secret
2015
Nutan	Palace Prince	Fair Mountain
2014
Sea The Moon	Lucky Lion	Open Your Heart
2013
Lucky Speed	Tres Blue	Nordvulkan
2012
Pastorius	Novellist	Girolamo
2011
Waldpark	Earl Of Tinsdal	Saltas

2010-2001
2010
Buzzword	Zazou	Russian Tango
2009
Wiener Walzer	Sordino	Toughness Danon
2008
Kamsin	Ostland	Top Lock
2007
Adlerflug	Antek	Anton Chekhov
2006
Schiaparelli	Dickens	Oriental Tiger
2005
Nicaron	Night Tango	Arcadio
2004
Shirocco	Malinas	Omikron
2003
Dai Jin	Ransom O'War	Storm Trooper
2002
Next Desert	Salve Regina	Tomori
2001
Boreal	Lierac	Near Honor
2000
Samum	Subiaco	Acamani

The Deutsches Derby is a Group 1 flat horse race in Germany open to three-year-old thoroughbred colts and fillies. It is run at Hamburg-Horn over a distance of 2,400 metres (about 1½ miles), and it is scheduled to take place each year in July.

It is Germany's equivalent of the Derby, a famous race in England.

== History ==
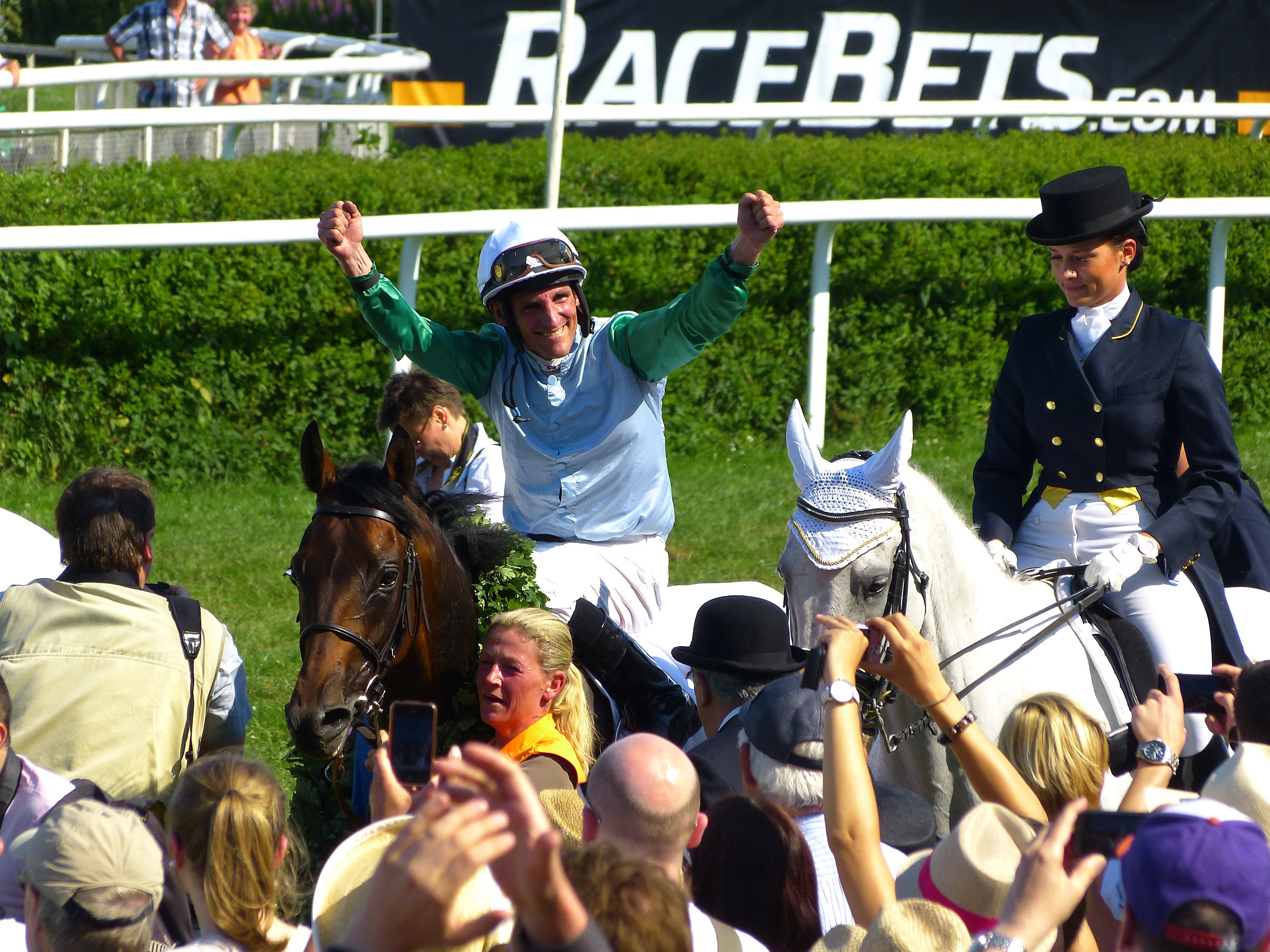
The 144th edition of Deutsches Derby in 2013.

The event was established in 1869, and it was originally called the Norddeutsches Derby. It became known as the Deutsches Derby in 1889.

For most of its history the race has been held at Hamburg. It has also been staged at Grunewald (1919), Hoppegarten (1943–44), Munich (1946) and Cologne (1947). It was titled the Grosser Deutschlandpreis der Dreijährigen during World War II.

The present system of race grading was introduced in Germany in 1972, and the Deutsches Derby was given Group 1 status.

The race was sponsored by BMW from 1991 to 2008. It was backed by IDEE Kaffee from 2009 to 2011 and Sparda-Bank from 2012 to 2014 before IDEE returned as sponsors from 2015.

In 2023, for the first time in the history of the Derby, a female trainer was able to win this prestigious race. Sarah Steinberg trained the Sea the Moon colt "Fantastic Moon" to victory.

== Records ==
Leading jockey (8 wins):

- Gerhard Streit – Orgelton (1938), Wehr Dich (1939), Schwarzgold (1940), Magnat (1941), Allgäu (1943), Solo (1946), Mangon (1952), Baalim (1961)
- Andrasch Starke – Robertico (1998), Samum (2000), Next Desert (2002), Schiaparelli (2006), Kamsin (2008), Lucky Speed (2013), Nutan (2015), Sisfahan (2021)

Leading trainer (9 wins):

- George Arnull – Mah Jong (1927), Alba (1930), Sturmvogel (1935), Orgelton (1938), Wehr Dich (1939), Schwarzgold (1940), Magnat (1941), Allgäu (1943), Asterblüte (1949)

Leading owner (19 wins):

- Gestüt Schlenderhan – Sieger (1908), Ariel (1914), Marmor (1918), Mah Jong (1927), Alba (1930), Sturmvogel (1935), Orgelton (1938), Wehr Dich (1939), Schwarzgold (1940), Magnat (1941), Allgäu (1943), Asterblüte (1949), Allasch (1953), Don Giovanni (1969), Alpenkönig (1970), Stuyvesant (1976), Adlerflug (2007), Wiener Walzer (2009), In Swoop (2020)

== Winners since 1965 ==
Year	Winner	Jockey	Trainer	Owner	Time
1965	Waidwerk	Johannes Starosta	Johannes Kuhr	Gestüt Ravensberg	2:33.00
1966	Ilix	Oskar Langner	Sven von Mitzlaff	Stall Gamshof	2:35.70
1967	Luciano	Lester Piggott	Sven von Mitzlaff	Stall Primerose	2:32.60
1968	Elviro	Peter Alafi	Sven von Mitzlaff	Gestüt Waldfried	2:33.40
1969	Don Giovanni	Brian Taylor	Heinz Jentzsch	Gestüt Schlenderhan	2:33.10
1970	Alpenkönig	Peter Kienzler	Heinz Jentzsch	Gestüt Schlenderhan	2:32.30
1971	Lauscher	Dave Richardson	Herbert Cohn	Gestüt Rösler	2:32.80
1972	Tarim	Geoff Lewis	Georg Zuber	Fredy Ostermann	2:40.20
1973	Athenagoras	Harro Remmert	Sven von Mitzlaff	Gestüt Zoppenbroich	2:28.80
1974	Marduk	Joan Pall	Hein Bollow	Countess Batthyany	2:35.20
1975	Königssee	José Orihuel	Adolf Wöhler	Gestüt Hohe Weide	2:29.80
1976	Stuyvesant	Ralf Suerland	Heinz Jentzsch	Gestüt Schlenderhan	2:29.10
1977	Surumu	George Cadwaladr	Adolf Wöhler	Gestüt Fährhof	2:29.70
1978	Zauberer	Bernd Selle	Heinz Jentzsch	Gestüt Bona	2:43.20
1979	Königsstuhl	Peter Alafi	Sven von Mitzlaff	Gestüt Zoppenbroich	2:39.00
1980	Navarino	Dave Richardson	Arthur-Paul Schlaefke	Hugo Einschütz	2:48.10
1981	Orofino	Peter Alafi	Sven von Mitzlaff	Gestüt Zoppenbroich	2:42.00
1982	Ako	Erwin Schindler	H. G. Heibertshausen	Steffi Seiler	2:40.60
1983	Ordos	Peter Alafi	Sven von Mitzlaff	Gestüt Zoppenbroich	2:32.50
1984	Lagunas	Georg Bocskai	Heinz Jentzsch	Gestüt Fährhof	2:40.20
1985	Acatenango	Andrzej Tylicki	Heinz Jentzsch	Gestüt Fährhof	2:29.40
1986	Philipo	Dave Richardson	Hartmut Steguweit	Stall Surinam	2:32.40
1987	Lebos	Lutz Mäder	Bruno Schütz	Stall Klingenstadt	2:34.10
1988	Luigi	Walter Swinburn	Uwe Ostmann	Stall Marcassargues	2:31.80
1989	Mondrian ^{[a]}	Kevin Woodburn	Uwe Stoltefuss	Stall Hanse	2:33.70
1990	Karloff	Mark Rimmer	Bruno Schütz	Stall Steigenberger	2:34.90
1991	Temporal	Frankie Dettori	Bruno Schütz	Stall Rosita	2:31.60
1992	Pik König	Billy Newnes	Andreas Wöhler	Albert Darboven	2:37.90
1993	Lando	Andrzej Tylicki	Heinz Jentzsch	Gestüt Ittlingen	2:26.80
1994	Laroche	Stephen Eccles	Heinz Jentzsch	Gestüt Ittlingen	2:28.40
1995	All My Dreams	Kevin Woodburn	Harro Remmert	Stall Rheinwiese	2:32.85
1996	Lavirco	Torsten Mundry	Peter Rau	Gestüt Fährhof	2:41.70
1997	Borgia	Olivier Peslier	Bruno Schütz	Gestüt Ammerland	2:31.04
1998	Robertico	Andrasch Starke	Andreas Schütz	Gestüt Hof Vesterberg	2:45.12
1999	Belenus	Kevin Darley	Andreas Wöhler	Turf Syndikat 99	2:25.81
2000	Samum	Andrasch Starke	Andreas Schütz	Stall Blankenese	2:32.21
2001	Boreal	John Reid	Peter Schiergen	Gestüt Ammerland	2:37.09
2002	Next Desert	Andrasch Starke	Andreas Schütz	Gestüt Wittekindshof	2:39.23
2003	Dai Jin	Olivier Peslier	Andreas Schütz	WH Sport International	2:33.47
2004	Shirocco	Andreas Suborics	Andreas Schütz	Georg von Ullmann	2:39.64
2005	Nicaron	Davy Bonilla	Horst Steinmetz	Stall Nizza	2:35.42
2006	Schiaparelli	Andrasch Starke	Peter Schiergen	Stall Blankenese	2:30.94
2007	Adlerflug	Fredrik Johansson	Jens Hirschberger	Gestüt Schlenderhan	2:36.57
2008	Kamsin	Andrasch Starke	Peter Schiergen	Stall Blankenese	2:39.29
2009	Wiener Walzer	Fredrik Johansson	Jens Hirschberger	Gestüt Schlenderhan	2:29.56
2010	Buzzword	Royston Ffrench	Mahmood Al Zarooni	Godolphin	2:29.51
2011	Waldpark	Jozef Bojko	Andreas Wöhler	Gestüt Ravensberg	2:40.29
2012	Pastorius	Terence Hellier	Mario Hofer	Stall Antanando	2:32.23
2013	Lucky Speed	Andrasch Starke	Peter Schiergen	Stall Hornoldendorf	2:27.87
2014	Sea The Moon	Christophe Soumillon	Markus Klug	Gestut Gorlsdorf	2:29.86
2015	Nutan	Andrasch Starke	Peter Schiergen	Juergen Imm	2:30.54
2016	Isfahan	Dario Vargiu	Andreas Wöhler	Darius Racing	2:45.97
2017	Windstoss	Maxim Pecheur	Markus Klug	Gestut Rottgen	2:41.52
2018	Weltstar	Adrie De Vries	Markus Klug	Gestut Rottgen	2:41.52
2019	Laccario	Eduardo Pedroza	Andreas Wöhler	Gestut Ittlingen	2:29.95
2020	In Swoop	Ronan Thomas	Francis-Henri Graffard	Gestut Schlenderhan	2:34.97
2021	Sisfahan	Andrasch Starke	Henk Grewe	Darius Racing	2:34.56
2022	Sammarco	Bauyrzhan Murzabayev	Peter Schiergen	Gestut Park Wiedingen	2:32.95
2023	Fantastic Moon	Rene Piechulek	Sarah Steinberg	Liberty Racing 2021	2:39.11
2024	Palladium	Thore Hammer-Hansen	Henk Grewe	Liberty Racing 2022	2:37.18
2025	Hochkonig	Nina Baltromei	Yasmin Almenrader	Stall Cloverleaf	2:37.10
2026	Dardanos	Wladimir Panov	Andreas Wöhler	Stall Bergholz	2:39.79

^{a} Taishan finished first in 1989, but he was relegated to second place following a stewards' inquiry.

== Earlier winners ==
- 1869: Investment
- 1870: Adonis
- 1871: Bauernfänger
- 1872: Hymenaeus ^{1}
- 1873: Amalie von Edelreich
- 1874: Paul
- 1875: Palmyra ^{2}
- 1876: Double Zero
- 1877: Pirat
- 1878: Oroszvar
- 1879: Künstlerin
- 1880: Gamiani
- 1881: Cäsar
- 1882: Taurus / Trachenberg ^{3}
- 1883: Tartar
- 1884: Stronzian
- 1885: Budagyöngye
- 1886: Potrimpos
- 1887: Zsupan
- 1888: Tegetthoff
- 1889: Uram Batyam
- 1890: Dalberg
- 1891: Peter
- 1892: Espoir
- 1893: Geier / Hardenberg ^{3}
- 1894: Sperber
- 1895: Impuls
- 1896: Trollhetta
- 1897: Flunkermichel
- 1898: Habenichts
- 1899: Galifard
- 1900: Hagen
- 1901: Tuki
- 1902: Macdonald
- 1903: Bono Modo
- 1904: Con Amore
- 1905: Patience
- 1906: Fels
- 1907: Desir
- 1908: Sieger
- 1909: Arnfried
- 1910: Orient
- 1911: Chilperic
- 1912: Gulliver II
- 1913: Turmfalke
- 1914: Ariel
- 1915: Pontresina
- 1916: Amorino
- 1917: Landgraf
- 1918: Marmor
- 1919: Gibraltar
- 1920: Herold
- 1921: Omen
- 1922: Hausfreund
- 1923: Augias
- 1924: Anmarsch
- 1925: Roland
- 1926: Ferro
- 1927: Mah Jong
- 1928: Lupus
- 1929: Graf Isolani
- 1930: Alba
- 1931: Dionys
- 1932: Palastpage
- 1933: Alchimist
- 1934: Athanasius
- 1935: Sturmvogel
- 1936: Nereide
- 1937: Abendfrieden
- 1938: Orgelton
- 1939: Wehr Dich
- 1940: Schwarzgold
- 1941: Magnat
- 1942: Ticino
- 1943: Allgäu
- 1944: Nordlicht
- 1945: no race
- 1946: Solo
- 1947: Singlspieler
- 1948: Birkhahn
- 1949: Asterblüte
- 1950: Niederländer
- 1951: Neckar
- 1952: Mangon
- 1953: Allasch
- 1954: Kaliber
- 1955: Lustige
- 1956: Kilometer
- 1957: Orsini
- 1958: Wilderer
- 1959: Uomo
- 1960: Alarich
- 1961: Baalim
- 1962: Herero
- 1963: Fanfar
- 1964: Zank

^{1} Primas finished first in 1872, but he was disqualified. Hymenaeus tied with Seemann, but he was awarded victory by the drawing of lots.
^{2} In 1875, after dead-heat between Palmyra and Schwindler by agreement of the owners Palmyra was declared the winner by walk-over.
^{3} The 1882 and 1893 races were dead-heats and have joint winners.

== See also ==
- List of German flat horse races
