= Filip Minařík =

Czech jockey (1975–2023)

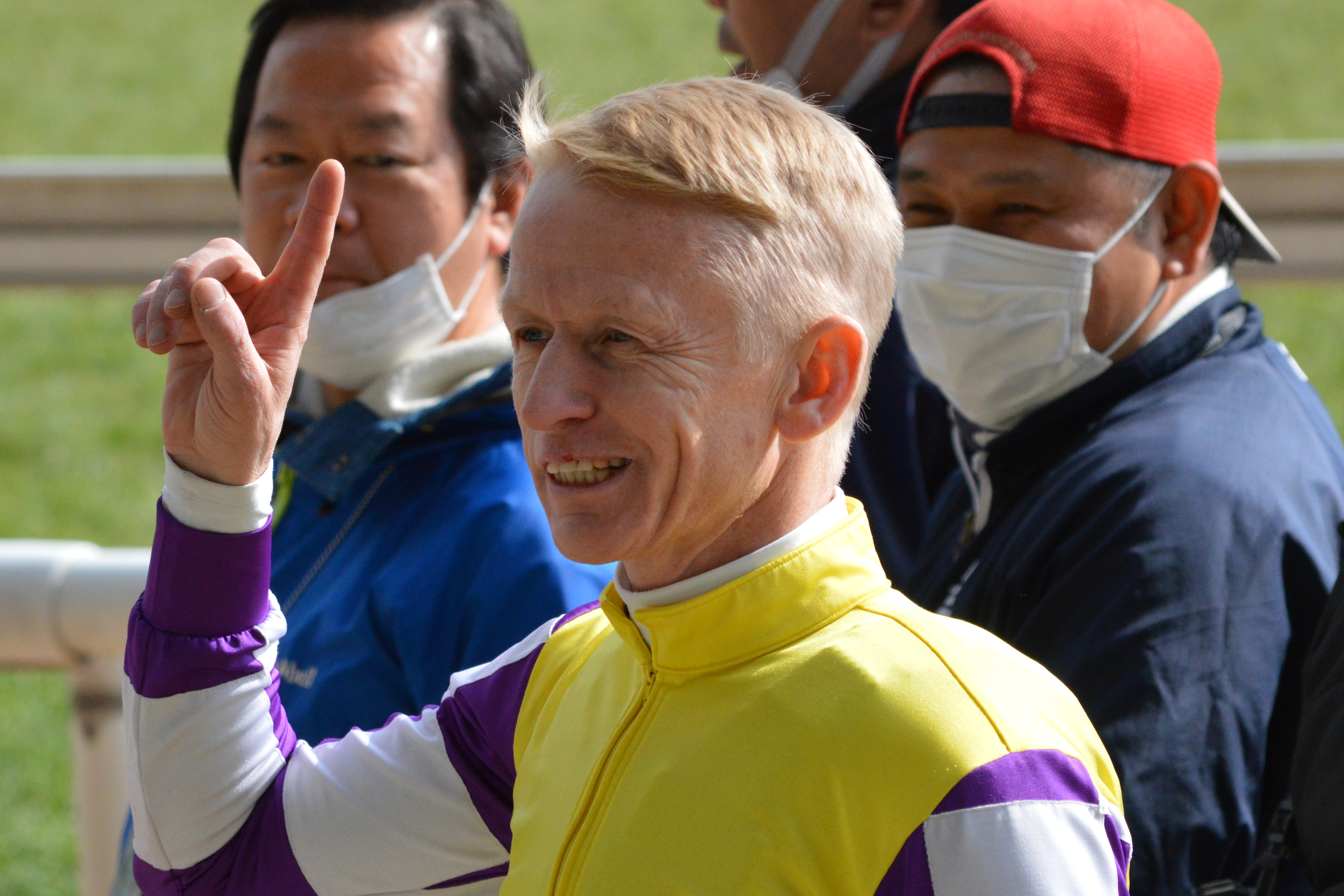
- Filip Minarik in 2018 (Tokyo Racecourse, Japan)
- Occupation: Jockey
- Born: 10 March 1975; Prague, Czechoslovakia
- Died: 4 September 2023 (aged 48)
- Spouse(s): Katja Minařík
- Major wins/Championships: Gran Criterium (2004); Preis von Europa (2005); Deutschlandpreis (2005); Großer Preis von Baden (2006, 2010, 2014, 2017); Preis der Diana (2012, 2018); Großer Preis von Bayern (2012, 2014, 2017); Bayerisches Zuchtrennen (2015); Mehl-Mülhens-Rennen (2009, 2018)

Filip Minařík (10 March 1975 – 4 September 2023) was a Czech jockey who was active in German horse racing.

== Early life and career ==
Filip Minařík was born in Prague on 10 March 1975.

Minařík won the German Jockey Championship in 2005, 2011, 2016, and 2017 (together with Alexander Pietsch).

After a serious fall during a horse race in Mannheim in July 2020, Minařík was in a coma for four weeks. This incident accelerated his plans to leave jockeying and contribute to the sport in other ways.

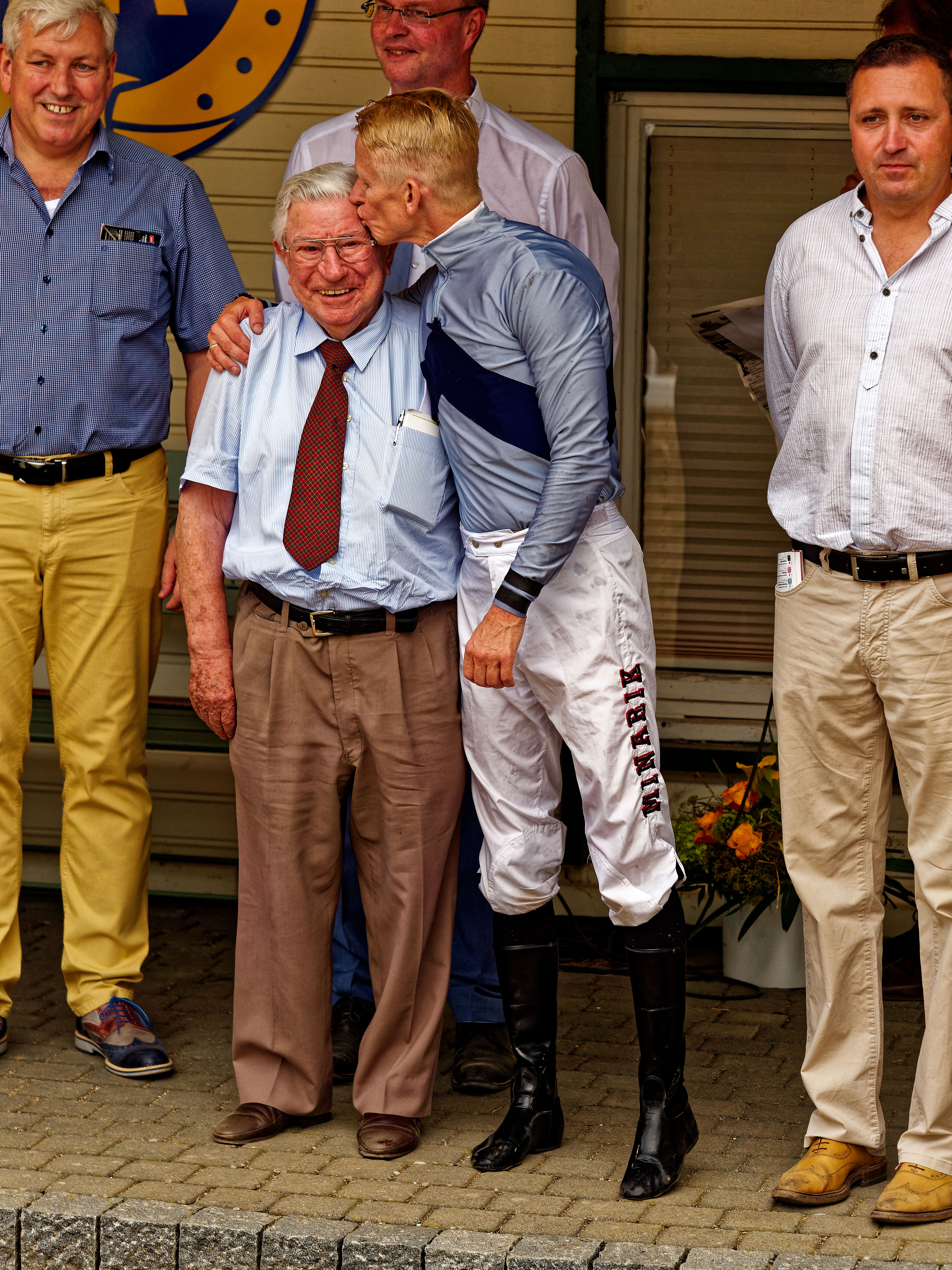
Filip Minařík with his friend Hein Bollow

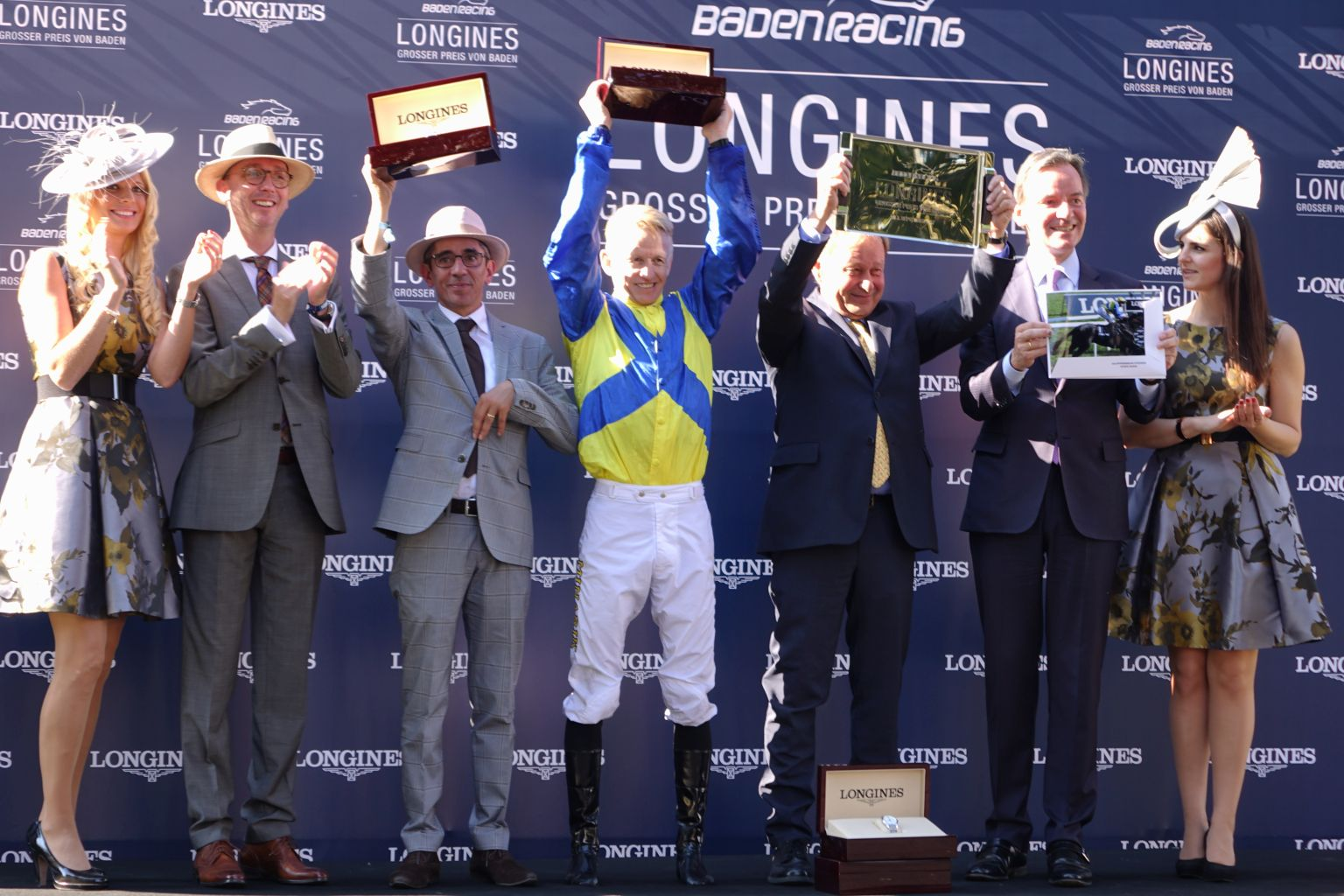
Filip Minařík (centre) at the award ceremony for the Grosser Preis von Baden

After retiring from his career as a jockey, Minařík was active as an ambassador for galloping.

=== Important victories ===
At the highest level, Group I, Minařík achieved many victories in Germany:

- Preis von Europa (2005 at Gonbarda at Weidenpescher Park in Cologne)
- Deutschlandpreis (2005 at Gonbarda at Galopprennbahn Grafenberg in Düsseldorf)
- 4× Großer Preis von Baden (2006 at Prince Flori, 2010 at Night Magic, 2014 at Ivanhowe, 2017 at Guignol jeweils at Rennplatz Iffezheim in Baden-Baden)
- Preis der Diana (2012 at Salomina, 2018 at Well Timed in Galopprennbahn Grafenberg in Düsseldorf)
- 3× Großer Preis von Bayern (2012 at Temida, 2014 at Galopprennbahn Riem in München-Riem, 2017 at Ito)
- Bayerisches Zuchtrennen (2015 at Guiliani in Galopprennbahn Riem in München-Riem)
- 3× Mehl-Mülhens-Rennen (2009 at Irian, 2018 at Ancient Spirit at Cologne-Weidenpesch Racecourse)

== Personal life and death ==
Filip Minařík was married to Katja Minařík and had a daughter. His father was the two-time Czech jockey champion and later trainer Ferdinand Minařík Sr.. His brother Ferdinand Jr. is also active in horse racing.

On 4 September 2023, Minařík committed suicide at the age of 48. The media reported that Minařík suffered from severe depression.
