= Thore Hammer-Hansen =

Danish jockey (born 1999)

Thor Hammer-Hansen
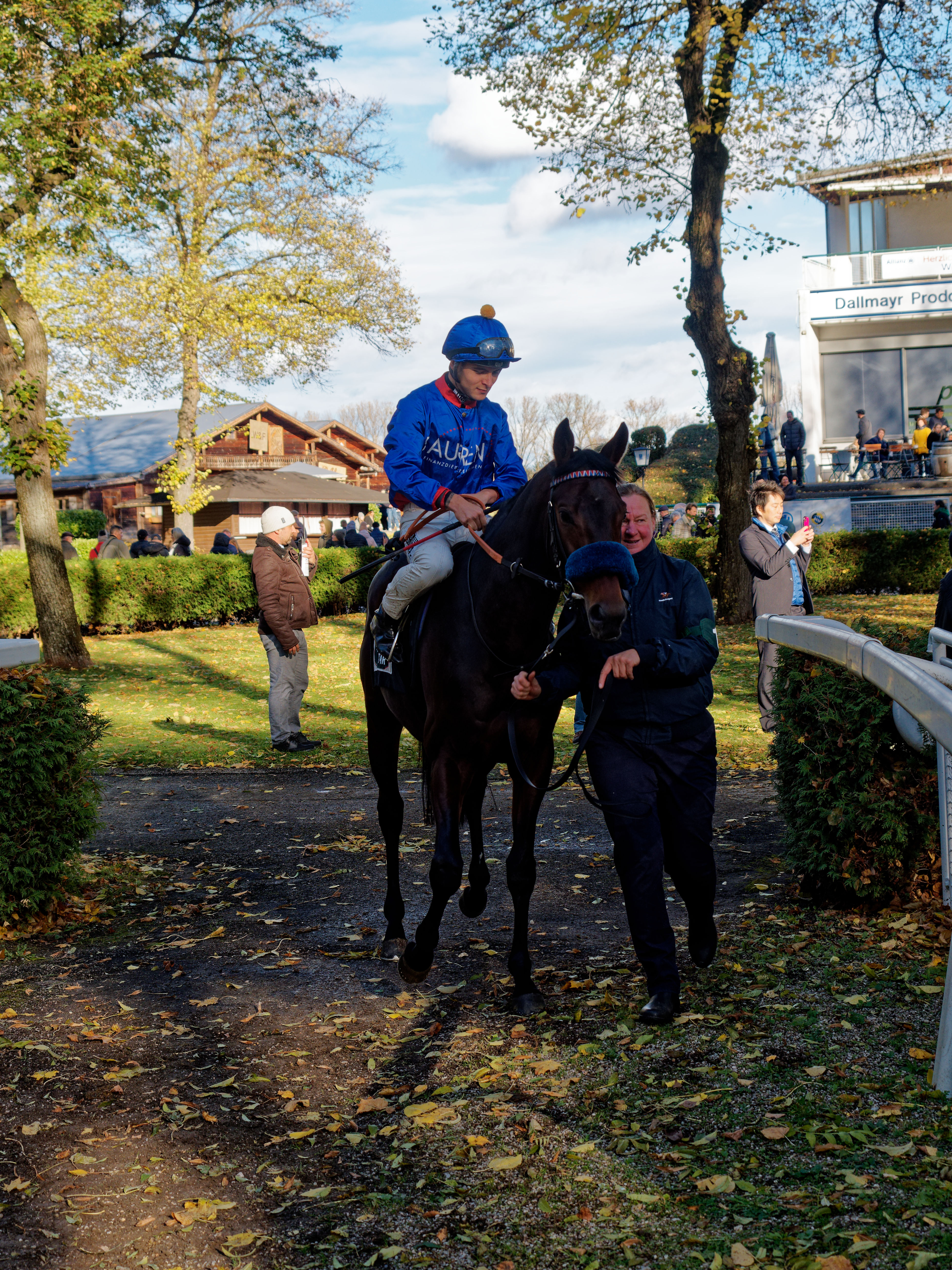
- Hammer-Hansen in 2023

Personal information
- Nationality: Danish
- Born: 17 October 1999 (age 26) Cologne, Germany

Horse racing career
- Sport: Horse racing

Thore Hammer-Hansen (born 17 October 1999) is a Danish jockey of thoroughbred race horses.

== Career ==
Thore Hammer-Hansen was born in 1999 at Cologne. His father, Lennart, was also a jockey in Germany and was an inspiration for him to also becoming a jockey.

Hammer-Hansen debuted in 2016 as an apprentice jockey in Germany before moving to André Fabre's stable in France. The following year he moved to Richard Hannon Jr.'s stable in the United Kingdom.

In 2023, Hammer-Hansen moved back to Germany and has ridden mainly in Germany ever since.

In 2024, Hammer-Hansen won the Deutsches Derby with Palladium. That same year he would also go on to become the leading jockey of Germany, having won a total of 74 races including the Grosser Preis von Bayern with Assistent.

He was selected as one of the foreign jockeys to compete in Japan's World All-Star Jockeys in 2025. At the World All-Star Jockeys, he would win two races and earned 73 points, winning the contest.

In 2026, Hammer-Hansen was issued a short term riding license in Japan, allowing him to ride in Japan for 1 month. During that time, he would win his first graded race in Japan, the Shinzan Kinen, with Thunderstruck.

== Major wins ==
- Deutsches Derby - (1) - Palladium (2024)
- Grosser Preis von Bayern - (1) - Assistent (2024)
