= Andreas Suborics =

Austrian jockey

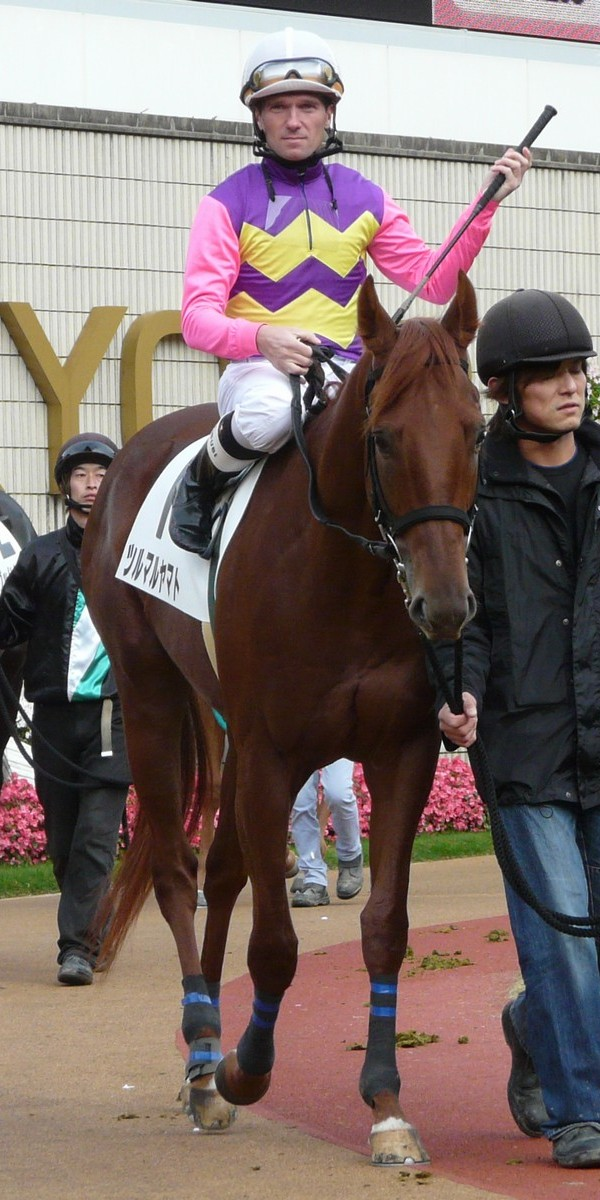

Personal information
- Born: 11 August 1971 (age 54) Vienna, Austria
- Occupation: Jockey

Horse racing career
- Sport: Horse racing
- Career wins: (ongoing)

Major racing wins
- Austrian Derby (1994, 1999); Prix de la Forêt (1996); Grosser Preis von Baden (1998); Mehl-Mülhens-Rennen (1999); Bayerisches Zuchtrennen (1999); Singapore Gold Cup (2001); Queen Elizabeth II Cup (2001); Premio Presidente della Repubblica (2001); Gran Premio di Milano (2001); Arlington Million (2001); Rheinland-Pokal (2001); Prix Chloé (2002); Oaks d'Italia (2003); Deutsches Derby (2004); Preis der Diana (2004); Critérium de Saint-Cloud (2004); Gran Premio del Jockey Club (2004)

Significant horses
- Tiger Hill, Silvano, Shirocco, Paolini, Overdose
- Updated on September 10, 2007

Andreas Suborics (born 11 August 1971) is an Austrian Thoroughbred horse racing jockey who is based in Germany and races worldwide.

A three-time champion jockey in Germany, Suborics is best known as the jockey who rode Shirocco in 2004 and Overdose who was rated as 2008 Best Sprinter in the World of all 3yo colts by timeform and IFHA. In 2013/2014, he ended the season with 14 wins for an HK career total of 55.
