= Andrasch Starke =

German jockey

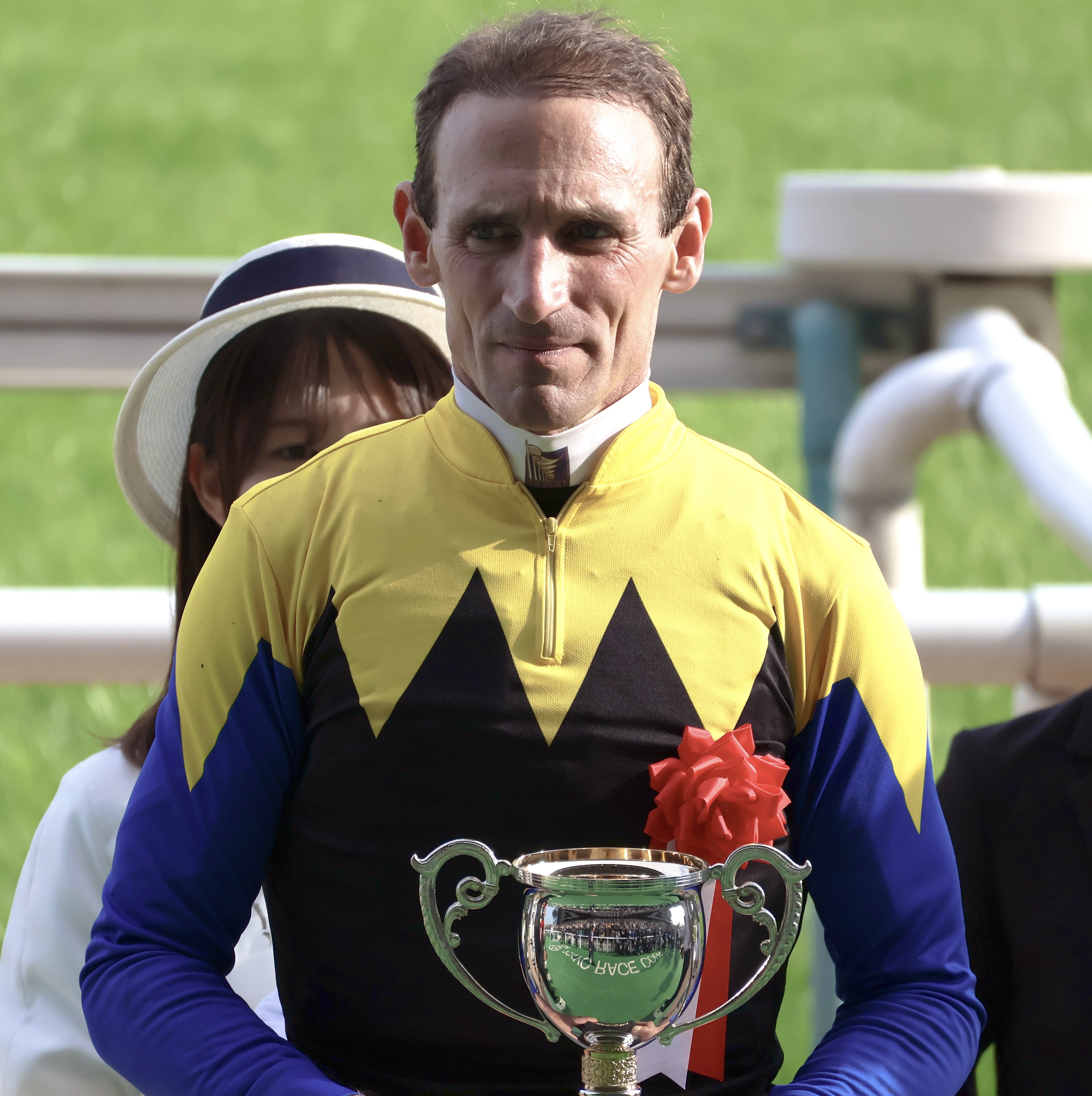
- Starke at the winning ceremony for the 2025 Flora Stakes

Personal information
- Born: 4 January 1974 (age 52) Germany
- Occupation: Jockey

Horse racing career
- Sport: Horse racing
- Career wins: ongoing

Major racing wins
- Premio Federico Tesio (1995); Preis der Diana (1996, 1998, 1999, 2003, 2008, 2017); Bayerisches Zuchtrennen (1997, 2006, 2007, 2012, 2013); Gran Premio del Jockey Club (1997, 2007); Premio Vittorio di Capua (1997, 1998); Rheinland-Pokal (1997, 1999, 2008); Deutsches Derby (1998, 2000, 2002, 2006, 2008,2015); Deutschland-Preis (1999, 2007); Premio Roma (1999, 2000); Grosser Preis von Baden (2000, 2007, 2012); Mehl-Mülhens-Rennen (2001); Singapore Airlines International Cup (2004); Prix Corrida (2005); Preis von Europa (2007, 2016); Gran Premio di Milano (2008, 2009); Oaks d'Italia (2008); Prix de l'Arc de Triomphe (2011); King George VI and Queen Elizabeth Stakes (2012); Yushun Himba (2025)

Racing awards
- German flat racing Champion Jockey (10 times)

Significant horses
- Ungaro, Elle Danzig, Samum, Caitano; Schiaparelli, Quijano Danedream, Kamunyak

Andrasch Starke (born 4 January 1974, in Germany) is a jockey in international Thoroughbred horse racing.

Starke began racing at age fifteen as an amateur and since turning professional has won the German riding championship six times. He has competed in Canada and the United States and has won races in Dubai, France, Italy, Japan, and Singapore. In recent years Starke has also raced seasonally in Hong Kong where on two occasions he won the Cathay Pacific International Jockeys' Championship at Happy Valley Racecourse. On 2 October 2011 Starke rode German filly Danedream to victory in the 90th Prix de l'Arc de Triomphe at Longchamp and on 21 July 2012 he won in Ascot the King George VI and Queen Elizabeth Stakes with the same filly.

He has also been named the German flat racing Champion Jockey 10 times in his career.

In January 2026 Starke announced his retirement.

== Major wins ==
France

- Prix de l'Arc de Triomphe - (1) - Danedream (2011)

Germany

- Bayerisches Zuchtrennen - (5) - Oxalagu (1997), Lord of England (2006), Soldier Hollow (2007), Pastorius (2012), Neatico (2013)
- Deutsches Derby - (8) - Robertico (1998), Samum (2000), Next Desert (2002), Schiaparelli (2006), Kamsin (2008), Lucky Speed (2013), Nutan (2015), Sisfahan (2021)
- Grosser Preis von Baden - (3) - Samum (2000), Danedream (2011, 2012)
- Grosser Preis von Berlin - (3) - Ungaro (1999), Schiaparelli (2007), Danedream (2011)
- Preis der Diana - (6) - Night Petticoat (1996), Elle Danzig (1998), Flamingo Road (1999), Next Gina (2003), Rosenreihe (2008), Lacazar (2017)
- Preis von Europa - (4) - Schiaparelli (2007), Girolamo (2012), Nightflower (2015, 2016)
- Rheinland-Pokal - (3) - Caitano (1997), Ungaro (1999), 2008 (Kamsin)

(United Kingdom) Great Britain

- King George VI and Queen Elizabeth Stakes - (1) - Danedream (2012)

Italy

- Gran Premio del Jockey Club - (3) - Caitano (1997), Schiaparelli (2007), Lovelyn (2015)
- Gran Premio di Milano - (2) - Quijano (2008, 2009)
- Premio Roma - (2) - Elle Danzig (1999, 2000)
- Premio Vittorio di Capua - (2) - Devil River Peek (1997), Waky Nao (1998)

Japan

- Yushun Himba - (1) - Kamunyak (2025)

Singapore

- Singapore Airlines International Cup - (1) - Epalo (2004)
