= Peter Schiergen =

German jockey and racehorse trainer

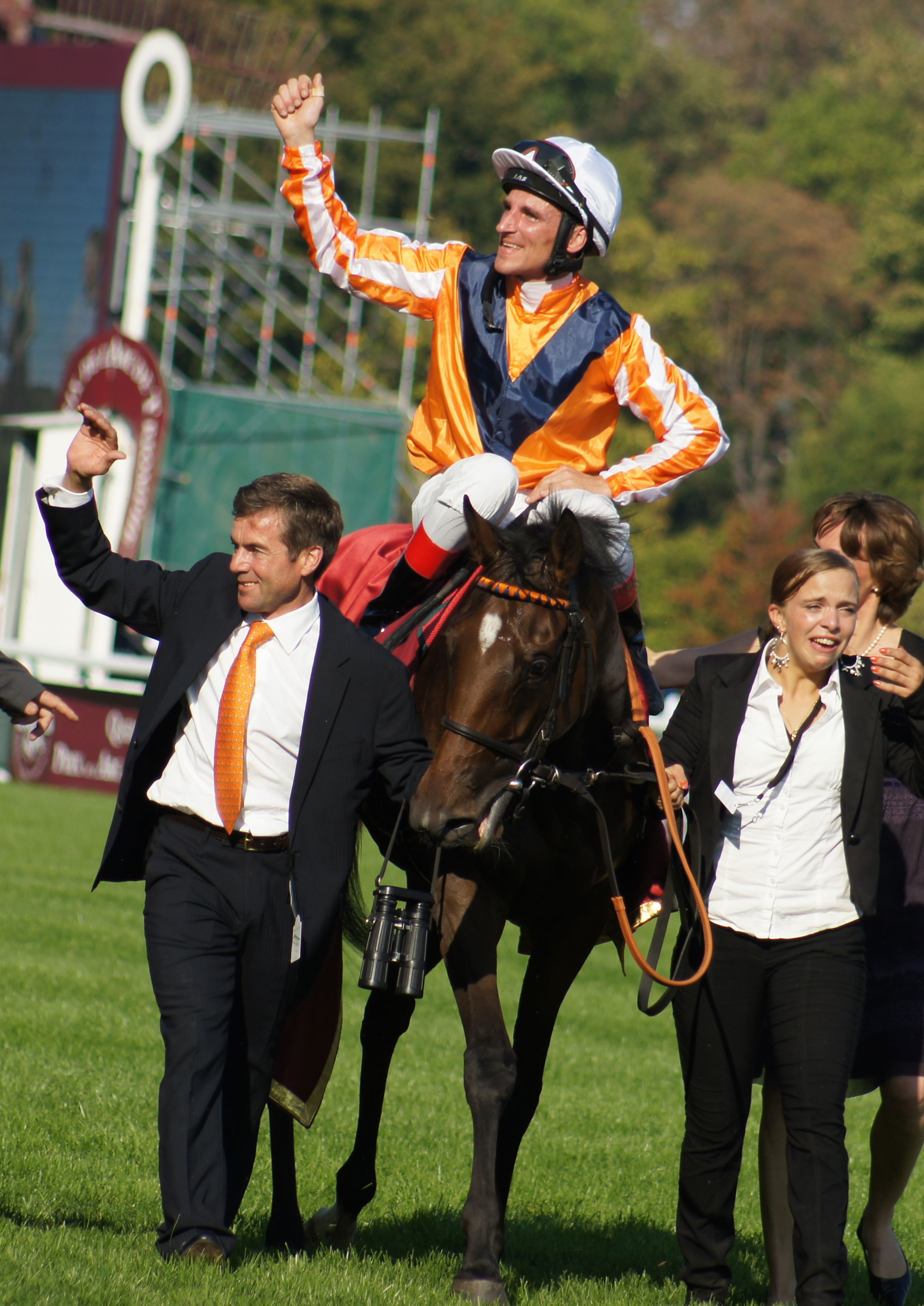
- Schiergen (left) with Danedream after winning the 2011 Prix de l'Arc de Triomphe

Personal information
- Nationality: German
- Born: 23 March 1965 (age 61) Willich in Germany
- Website: www.schiergen.de

Sport
- Country: Germany
- Sport: Equestrian (horse racing)

Peter Schiergen (born 23 March 1965 in Willich, West Germany) is a former German champion jockey and a Thoroughbred racehorse trainer.

== Jockey ==
Schiergen is the holder of the European winner-riding record.

After Hein Bollow, Peter Schiergen is the second member in the German "Club 1000" twice. 1000 ridden winners and 1000 trained winners.

== Horse trainer ==
- Schiergen trained Boreal, winner of the 2001 Coronation Cup.
- Schiergen had three starters in the 136th running of the Deutsches (German) Derby.
- Schiergen won his third German Derby in 2008, on Kasmin.
- Schiergen has several times been the German flat racing Champion Trainer
- He trained Danedream, winner of the 2011 Prix de l'Arc de Triomphe.
