= Stockholms Stora Pris =

Flat horse race in Sweden

- Class: Group 3
- Location: Bro Park Racecourse; Upplands-Bro Municipality, Sweden
- Inaugurated: 1930
- Race type: Flat / Thoroughbred
- Website: Bro Park

Race information
- Distance: 1,750 metres (1m 165y)
- Surface: Turf
- Track: Left-handed
- Qualification: Four-years-old and up
- Weight: 59 kg Allowances; 2 kg for fillies and mares
- Purse: 1,200,000 kr (2018); 1st: 700,000 kr

The Stockholms Stora Pris is a Group 3 flat horse race in Sweden open to thoroughbreds aged four years or older. It is run over a distance of 1,750 metres (1 mile and 165 yards) at Bro Park from 2016 (earlier at Täby before the closure of the venue), in June.

== History ==
The event was established in 1930, and its initial prize money was 12,000 kronor. The first winner was called St Hans.

For a period the Stockholms Stora Pris held Listed status. It was promoted to Group 3 level in 2006. It is currently one of two Group races in Sweden, along with the Stockholm Cup International.

== Records ==
Most successful horse since 1996 (3 wins):

- Hurricane Red - 2015, 2017, 2018

Leading jockey since 1996 (5 wins):

- Jacob Johansen - Tesorero (2002), Hurricane Red (2015, 2017, 2018), Admiral De Vega (2023)

Leading trainer since 1996 (5 wins):

- Niels Petersen - Without Fear (2013), Bank Of Burden (2014), Kick On (2020), King David (2022), Mount Kilimanjaro (2026)

== Winners since 1996 ==
Year	Winner	Age	Jockey	Trainer	Time
1996	Philidor	7	Fernando Diaz	Arnfinn Lund	1:57.70
1997	Songline	4	Janos Tandari	Tommy Gustafsson
1998	Galtee	6	Cash Asmussen	Uwe Stoltefuss	2:01.90
1999	Hangover Square	5	Mark Larsen	Lennart Reuterskiöld	1:57.40
2000 (dh)	Hangover Square; Stato One	6; 8	Mark Larsen; Yvonne Durant	Lennart Reuterskiöld; Yvonne Durant	1:58.10
2001	Stato One	9	John Fortune	Rune Haugen	1:58.10
2002	Tesorero	6	Jacob Johansen	Are Hyldmo	1:57.90
2003	Mandrake el Mago	4	David Sanchez	Francisco Castro	1:57.80
2004	Mandrake el Mago	5	Manuel Santos	Francisco Castro	1:59.20
2005	Jubilation	6	Manuel Martinez	Fredrik Reuterskiöld	2:01.50
2006	Jubilation	7	Fernando Diaz	Fredrik Reuterskiöld	2:02.80
2007	Funny Legend	6	Fredrik Johansson	Wido Neuroth	1:59.00
2008	Peas and Carrots	5	Eddie Ahern	Lennart Reuterskiöld, Jr.	1:57.70
2009	Appel au Maitre	5	Fredrik Johansson	Wido Neuroth	2:01.60
2010	Tertullus	7	Espen Ski	Rune Haugen	1:57.80
2011	Tertullus	8	Rafael Schistl	Rune Haugen	1:59.40
2012	Sir Lando	5	Fredrik Johansson	Wido Neuroth	2:03.90
2013	Without Fear	5	Elione Chaves	Niels Petersen	2:02.50
2014	Bank Of Burden	7	Per-Anders Graberg	Niels Petersen	1:57.60
2015	Hurricane Red	5	Jacob Johansen	Lennart Reuterskiöld, Jr.	1:58.10
2016	Coprah	8	Nelson De Souza	Cathrine Erichsen	1:48.90
2017	Hurricane Red	7	Jacob Johansen	Lennart Reuterskiöld, Jr.	1:49.70
2018	Hurricane Red	8	Jacob Johansen	Lennart Reuterskiöld, Jr.	1:42.70
2019	Learn By Heart	4	Rafael de Oliveira	Bent Olsen	1:48.20
2020	Kick On	4	Carlos Lopez	Niels Petersen	1:48.30
2021	Match Maker	6	Elione Chaves	Cathrine Erichsen	1:46.50
2022	King David	7	Oliver Wilson	Niels Petersen	1:45.40
2023	Admiral De Vega	4	Jacob Johansen	Annike Bye Hansen	1:43.70
2024	Good Fortune	6	Kevin Stott	Soren Jensen	1:45.40
2025	Admiral De Vega	6	Elione Chaves	Annike Bye Hansen	1:43.70
2026	Mount Kilimanjaro	4	Carlos Lopez	Niels Petersen	1:44.70

== See also ==
- List of Scandinavian flat horse races
