= Bro Park Sprint Championship =

Flat horse race in Sweden

- Class: Listed
- Location: Bro Park Racecourse; Upplands-Bro, Sweden
- Inaugurated: 1924
- Race type: Flat / Thoroughbred
- Website: Bro Park

Race information
- Distance: 1,150 metres (5¾f)
- Surface: Turf
- Track: Left-handed
- Qualification: Three-years-old and up
- Weight: 58 kg (3yo); 59 kg (4yo+); Allowances; 1½ kg for fillies and mares
- Purse: 600,000 kr (2012); 1st: 300,000 kr

The Bro Park Sprint Championship is a Listed flat horse race in Sweden open to thoroughbreds aged three years or older. It is run at Bro Park over a distance of 1,150 metres (about 5¾ furlongs), and it is scheduled to take place each year in September.

== History ==
The event was originally held at Ulriksdal as the Ulriksdallöpning. It was established in 1924, and was initially contested by horses aged two or older over 1,100 metres.

The race was transferred to Täby's Stockholm Cup International meeting in the early 1980s. For a period it was known as the Täby International Sprinter Stakes.

The Täby Open Sprint Championship was given Group 3 status in 1998. It was downgraded to Listed level in 2009. Täby Racecourse closed in May 2016 and the race was transferred to its replacement, Bro Park, from the 2016 running and renamed the Bro Park Sprint Championship.

== Records ==
Most successful horse since 1960 (2 wins):

- Kapten Moss – 1977, 1978
- Simon Sacc – 1986, 1988
- Calrissian – 2008, 2009
- Easy Road - 2015, 2016

Leading jockey since 1960 (3 wins):

- Gunnar Nordling – Kapten Moss (1978), Itsabrahma (1991), Waquaas (2000)
- Rafael Schistl – Calrissian (2009), Giant Sandman (2011), Elusive Time (2012)
- Jacob Johansen - Alcohuaz (2010), Ragazzo (2014), General De Vega (2021)

Leading trainer since 1960 (4 wins):

- Niels Petersen - Francis (2007), Beat Baby (2013), Tinnitus (2017), Could Be King (2022)

== Winners since 1990 ==
| Year | Winner | Age | Jockey | Trainer | Time |
|---|---|---|---|---|---|
| 1990 | King Krimson | 6 | Neil Grant | Gerd Smöttebråten | 1:15.60 |
| 1991 | Itsabrahma | 5 | Gunnar Nordling | Ewy Nordling | 1:10.50 |
| 1992 | Parios | 4 | Fredrik Johansson | Elisabeth Gautier | 1:10.50 |
| 1993 | Bunty Boo | 4 | Allan Mackay | Bryan McMahon | 1:10.90 |
| 1994 | Informant | 4 | Fredrik Johansson | Søren Jensen | 1:08.20 |
| 1995 | Hever Golf Rose | 4 | Jason Weaver | Joe Naughton | 1:09.00 |
| 1996 | Jayannpee | 5 | Frankie Dettori | Ian Balding | 1:09.00 |
| 1997 | Options Open | 5 | Yvonne Durant | Are Hyldmo | 1:13.00 |
| 1998 | Mortens Prospect | 4 | Janos Tandari | Cathrine Erichsen | 1:10.70 |
| 1999 | Proud Native | 5 | Alex Greaves | David Nicholls | 1:07.40 |
| 2000 | Waquaas | 4 | Gunnar Nordling | Ewy Nordling | 1:06.50 |
| 2001 | El Gran Lode | 6 | Joakim Brandt | Diego Lowther | 1:12.00 |
| 2002 | Pistachio | 6 | Manuel Santos | Arnfinn Lund | 1:06.70 |
| 2003 | Aramus | 6 | Manuel Santos | Francisco Castro | 1:06.40 |
| 2004 | Steve's Champ | 4 | Fernando Diaz | Rune Haugen | 1:06.20 |
| 2005 | Pipoldchap | 5 | Nicholas Cordrey | Francisco Castro | 1:07.50 |
| 2006 | Bellamont Forest | 10 | Dina Danekilde | Ole Larsen | 1:10.20 |
| 2007 | Francis | 9 | Espen Ski | Niels Petersen | 1:11.20 |
| 2008 | Calrissian | 4 | Manuel Martinez | Lars Kelp | 1:09.50 |
| 2009 | Calrissian | 5 | Rafael Schistl | Fredrik Reuterskiöld | 1:08.20 |
| 2010 | Alcohuaz | 5 | Jacob Johansen | Lennart Reuterskiöld, Jr. | 1:07.20 |
| 2011 | Giant Sandman | 4 | Rafael Schistl | Rune Haugen | 1:07.40 |
| 2012 | Elusive Time | 4 | Rafael Schistl | Francisco Castro | 1:06.80 |
| 2013 | Beat Baby | 6 | Per-Anders Gråberg | Niels Petersen | 1:06.30 |
| 2014 | Ragazzo | 5 | Jacob Johansen | Annike Bye Hansen | 1:06.90 |
| 2015 | Easy Road | 5 | Rafael de Oliveira | Cathrine Erichsen | 1:11.10 |
| 2016 | Easy Road | 6 | Nelson de Souza | Cathrine Erichsen | 1:09.00 |
| 2017 | Tinnitus | 4 | Per-Anders Gråberg | Niels Petersen | 1:12.70 |
| 2018 | Ambiance | 7 | Rafael de Oliveira | Dina Danekilde | 1:10.80 |
| 2019 | Corinthia Knight | 4 | Luke Morris | Archie Watson | 1:10.40 |
| 2020 | Sarookh | 5 | Oliver Wilson | Jessica Lang | 1:10.30 |
| 2021 | General De Vega | 4 | Jacob Johansen | Annike Bye Hansen | 1:10.90 |
| 2022 | Could Be King | 6 | Carlos Lopez | Niels Petersen | 1:10.40 |
| 2023 | Washington Heights | 3 | Hollie Doyle | Kevin Ryan | 1:09.40 |
| 2024 | Aphelios | 5 | Elione Chaves | Annike Bye Hansen | 1:09.60 |
| 2025 | Lamborghini Bf | 4 | Carlos Lopez | Fredrik Reuterskiöld | 1:09.00 |
| 2026 | Lamborghini Bf | 5 | Elione Chaves | Fredrik Reuterskiöld | 1:09.60 |

== Earlier winners ==
- 1960: Desert Song
- 1961: Popular
- 1962: Slabang
- 1963: Bow Tie
- 1964: no race
- 1965: San Michele
- 1966–71: no race
- 1972: Rebellico
- 1973–74: no race
- 1975: Ruling Party
- 1976: Chin Chin
- 1977: Kapten Moss
- 1978: Kapten Moss
- 1979: Modern Pleasure
- 1980: Old Dominion
- 1981: Music Streak
- 1982: Doc Marten
- 1983: Coquito's Friend
- 1984: Kirchner
- 1985: Powder Keg
- 1986: Simon Sacc
- 1987: Burhaain
- 1988: Simon Sacc
- 1989: My Corncrake

== See also ==
- List of Scandinavian flat horse races
- Recurring sporting events established in 1924 – this race is included under its original title, Ulriksdallöpning.
