= Pramms Memorial =

Flat horse race in Sweden

- Class: Listed
- Location: Jägersro Racecourse; Jägersro, Sweden
- Inaugurated: 1984
- Race type: Flat / Thoroughbred
- Website: Jägersro

Race information
- Distance: 1,730 metres (1m 132y)
- Surface: Dirt
- Track: Left-handed
- Qualification: Four-years-old and up
- Weight: 59 kg Allowances; 1½ kg for fillies and mares
- Purse: 800,000 kr (2015); 1st: 400,000 kr

The Pramms Memorial is a Listed flat horse race in Sweden open to thoroughbreds aged four years or older. It is run over a distance of 1,730 metres (1 mile and 132 yards) at Jägersro in May.

== History ==
The event is named in memory of Per-Erik Pramm, a successful owner-breeder in Sweden. It was established in 1984, and the first running was won by Avrio.

For a period the Pramms Memorial held Listed status. It was promoted to Group 3 level in 2012. and relegated back to Listed level in 2016.

Unusually for a Group or Listed race in Europe, the Pramms Memorial is run on a dirt track.

== Records ==
Most successful horse (3 wins):

- Duca di Como - 2020, 2022, 2023

Leading jockey (6 wins):

- Elione Chaves - Luca Brasi (2011), Silver Ocean (2015), Duca di Como (2020, 2022, 2023), Aphelios (2025)

Leading trainer (3 wins):

- Arnfinn Lund – Philidor (1995), Exbourne's Wish (2001, 2002)
- Francisco Castro – Mandrake el Mago (2003), Luca Brasi (2010, 2011)
- Niels Petersen - Salt Track (2007), Plantaganet (2013), Silver Ocean (2015)
- Cathrine Erichsen - Duca di Como (2020, 2022, 2023)

== Winners ==
Year	Winner	Age	Jockey	Trainer	Time
1984	Avrio	5	Lotta Broström	Mikael Magnusson
1985	Ronniya		Philippe Courtheuse	Tommy Gustafsson
1986	Le Mans	5	Andy Auld	Sören Östgård
1987	Rutger Hermes	5	George Dickie	Kristina Lokrantz
1988	Kirowan	4	Gunnar Nordling	Gunnar Nordling
1989	Red Hero	5	Ken Stott	Knut Engan
1990	French Singer	5	Ole Larsen	Søren Jensen
1991	Red Hero	7	Trond Jörgensen	Knut Engan
1992	Gypsy River	5	Gunnar Nordling	Ewy Nordling
1993	Cosmos Streak	4	Russel Muggeridge	Hubert Doria
1994	Flyintor	5	Fredrik Johansson	Søren Jensen
1995	Philidor	6	Fernando Diaz	Arnfinn Lund
1996	Blue Chief	4	Fredrik Johansson	Wido Neuroth
1997	Heart of Oak	5	Mark Larsen	Olle Stenström
1998	Banzhaf	5	Mikael Wiking	Claes Björling
1999	Banzhaf	6	Rebecca Colldin	Claes Björling
2000	Stato One	8	Yvonne Durant	Yvonne Durant	1:49.80
2001	Exbourne's Wish	6	Manuel Santos	Arnfinn Lund	1:48.40
2002	Exbourne's Wish	7	Manuel Santos	Arnfinn Lund	1:47.00
2003	Mandrake el Mago	4	David Sanchez	Francisco Castro	1:47.70
2004	Vortex	5	Nicholas Cordrey	Gay Kelleway	1:49.00
2005	Billy Allen	4	Stéphane Pasquier	Fabrice Chappet	1:47.60
2006	Binary File	8	Kim Andersen	Lars Kelp	1:47.60
2007	Salt Track	7	Espen Ski	Niels Petersen	1:48.30
2008	Peas and Carrots	5	Manuel Santos	Lennart Reuterskiöld, Jr.	1:47.90
2009	Prince Fasliyev	5	Fabrice Veron	Henri-Alex Pantall	1:47.20
2010	Luca Brasi	6	Rafael Schistl	Francisco Castro	1:46.20
2011	Luca Brasi	7	Elione Chaves	Francisco Castro	1:46.80
2012	Premio Loco	8	George Baker	Chris Wall	1:46.80
2013	Plantagenet	6	Per-Anders Graberg	Niels Petersen	1:47.10
2014	Avon Pearl	5	Jacob Johansen	Rune Haugen	1:45.20
2015	Silver Ocean	7	Elione Chaves	Niels Petersen	1:45.50
2016	Hurricane Red	6	Jacob Johansen	Lennart Reuterskiöld, Jr.	1:46.00
2017	Brownie	5	Oliver Wilson	Bent Olsen	1:45.70
2018	Victor Kalejs	4	Per-Anders Graberg	Roy Arne Kvisla	1:47.70
2019	Plata O Plomo	5	Carlos Lopez	Susanne Berneklint	1:47.10
2020	Duca di Como	5	Elione Chaves	Cathrine Erichsen	1:46.70
2021	Jazz Explosion	5	Per-Anders Graberg	Bodit Hallencreutz	1:46.30
2022	Duca di Como	7	Elione Chaves	Cathrine Erichsen	1:45.70
2023	Duca di Como	8	Elione Chaves	Cathrine Erichsen	1:46.60
2024	Stroxx Carlras	6	Kevin Stott	Rikke Rohbach Bonde	1:48.20
2025	Aphelios	6	Elione Chaves	Annike Bye Hansen	1:46.90
2026	Aphelios	7	Jacob Johansen	Annike Bye Hansen	1:47.40

== See also ==
- List of Scandinavian flat horse races
