= Marit Sveaas Minneløp =

Flat horse race in Norway

- Class: Group 3
- Location: Øvrevoll Racecourse; Øvrevoll, Norway
- Inaugurated: 1991
- Race type: Flat / Thoroughbred
- Website: Øvrevoll

Race information
- Distance: 1,800 m (5,900 ft)
- Surface: Turf
- Track: Left-handed
- Qualification: Three-years-old and up
- Weight: 56 kg (3yo); 59 kg (4yo+); Allowances; 2 kg for fillies and mares Penalties; 3 kg for Group 1 winners * 2 kg for Group 2 winners * 1 kg for Group 3 winners * * since January 1
- Purse: 1,300,000 kr (2017); 1st: 800,000 kr

The Marit Sveaas Minneløp is a Group 3 flat horse race in Norway open to thoroughbreds aged three years or older. It is run over a distance of 1,800 m (5,900 ft) Øvrevoll in August.

== History ==
The event was founded by Christen Sveaas, a Norwegian financier, in 1991. It is named after his mother, Marit, who died that year. The first running had a winner's prize of 89,500 kroner.

The race was given Listed status in 1992, and from this point it offered 200,000 kroner to the winner. Its prize was increased several times thereafter.

The Marit Sveaas Minneløp was promoted to Group 3 level in 2001. It was one of two Norwegian races given Group status that year, along with the Polar Cup.

The winner's prize was raised to 1,000,000 kroner in 2007. It was reduced to 800,000 kroner in 2009. The race currently has the richest first-place prize in Scandinavia.

== Records ==
Most successful horse (2 wins):

- Regal Parade – 1991, 1993
- Valley Chapel – 2000, 2001
- Bank of Burden - 2012, 2014
- Square de Luynes - 2019, 2021

Leading jockey (4 wins):

- Fredrik Johansson – Valley Chapel (2001), Royal Experiment (2003), Funny Legend (2007), Appel au Maitre (2008)

Leading trainer (10 wins):

- Niels Petersen - Bank of Burden (2012, 2014), Trouble Of Course (2017), Our Last Summer (2018), Square de Luynes (2019, 2021), Kick On (2020), King David (2022), Chianti (2024), War Socks (2026)

== Winners ==
Year	Winner	Age	Jockey	Trainer	Time
1991	Regal Parade	7	Johan Stenström	Olle Stenström	1:49.70
1992	Rose of Miami	5	Janos Tandari	Arnfinn Lund	1:52.90
1993	Regal Parade	9	Janos Tandari	Olle Stenström	1:57.00
1994	Coneybury	4	Gunnar Nordling	Wido Neuroth	1:53.30
1995	Philidor	6	Fernando Diaz	Arnfinn Lund	1:48.80
1996	Kill the Crab	4	Mark Larsen	Wido Neuroth	1:50.20
1997	Stato One	5	Luis Santos	Raymond Durant	1:49.90
1998	Loch Bering	6	Richard Hughes	Arnfinn Lund	1:54.90
1999	Jaunty Jack	5	Kim Andersen	Are Hyldmo	1:48.00
2000	Valley Chapel	4	Eddie Ahern	Wido Neuroth	1:52.00
2001	Valley Chapel	5	Fredrik Johansson	Wido Neuroth	1:53.10
2002	Martellian	6	Kim Andersen	Are Hyldmo	1:46.30
2003	Royal Experiment	4	Fredrik Johansson	Wido Neuroth	1:50.20
2004	Mandrake el Mago	5	Manuel Santos	Francisco Castro	1:48.10
2005	Jubilation	6	Manuel Martinez	Fredrik Reuterskiöld	1:47.30
2006	Binary File	8	Manuel Santos	Lars Kelp	1:50.80
2007	Funny Legend	6	Fredrik Johansson	Wido Neuroth	1:48.80
2008	Appel au Maitre	4	Fredrik Johansson	Wido Neuroth	1:50.30
2009	Theatrical Award	4	Carlos Lopez	Marianne Tveter	1:50.00
2010	Touch of Hawk	4	L. Hammer-Hansen	Wido Neuroth	1:51.70
2011	Entangle	5	Jacob Johansen	Arnfinn Lund	1:53.50
2012	Bank of Burden	5	Rafael Schistl	Niels Petersen	1:50.70
2013	Berling	6	Manuel Martinez	Jessica Long	1:46.90
2014	Bank of Burden	7	Per-Anders Graberg	Niels Petersen	1:51.90
2015	Fearless Hunter	5	Carlos Lopez	Rune Haugen	1:47.40
2016	Brownie	4	Oliver Wilson	Bent Olsen	1:50.20
2017	Trouble Of Course	3	Per-Anders Graberg	Niels Petersen	1:49.30
2018	Our Last Summer	5	Rafael Schistl	Niels Petersen	1:47.00
2019	Square de Luynes	4	Pat Cosgrave	Niels Petersen	1:47.10
2020	Kick On	4	Carlos Lopez	Niels Petersen	1:48.00
2021	Square de Luynes	6	Pat Cosgrave	Niels Petersen	1:45.70
2022	King David	7	Oliver Wilson	Niels Petersen	1:48.20
2023	Hard One To Please	4	Sandro De Paiva	Annike Bye Hansen	1:54.70
2024	Chianti	5	Ulrika Holmquist	Niels Petersen	1:52.70
2025	Simply Minds	7	Manuel Martinez	Hanne Radstoga	1:47.60
2026	War Socks	4	Thore Hammer Hansen	Niels Petersen	1:45.50

== See also ==
- List of Scandinavian flat horse races
