= Stockholm Cup International =

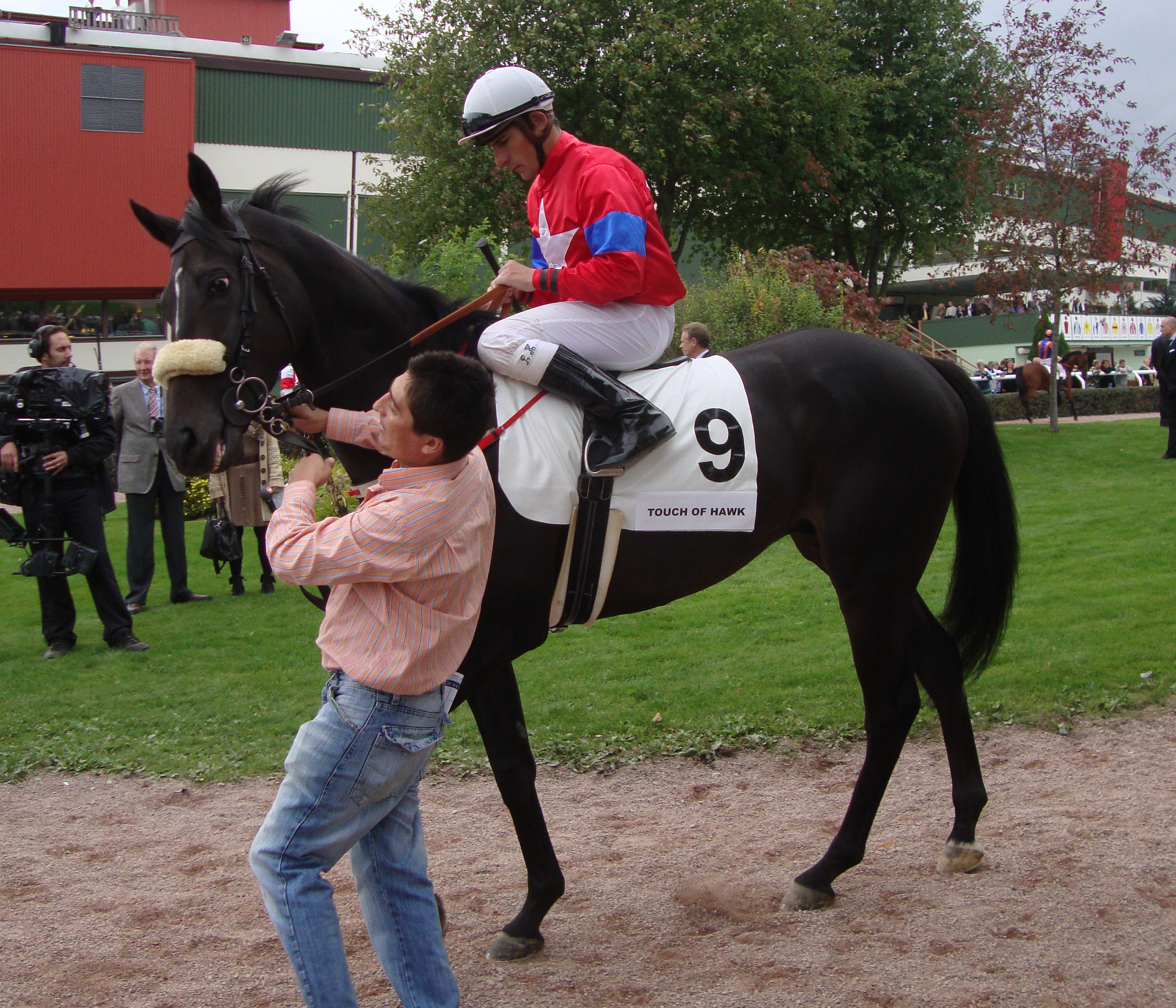
- Touch of Hawk, the 2009 winner.
- Class: Group 3
- Location: Bro Park; Upplands-Bro, Sweden
- Inaugurated: 1937
- Race type: Flat / Thoroughbred
- Website: Bro Park

Race information
- Distance: 2,400 metres (1½ miles)
- Surface: Turf
- Track: Left-handed
- Qualification: Three-years-old and up
- Weight: 56 kg (3yo); 59 kg (4yo+); Allowances; 2 kg for fillies and mares
- Purse: 1,700,000 kr (2019); 1st: 1,000,000 kr

The Stockholm Cup International is a Group 3 flat horse race in Sweden open to thoroughbreds aged three years or older. It is run at Bro Park over a distance of 2,400 metres (about 1½ miles), and it is scheduled to take place each year in September.

== History ==
The event was originally held at Ulriksdal as the Grand Prix. It was established in 1937, and was initially contested over 1,800 metres.

The race became known as the Stockholm-Löpning in 1951. Its prize money was increased significantly in 1955, and by this time its distance was 2,400 metres. It was renamed the Stockholm Cup in 1956.

There was no running from 1960 to 1962, and the race was transferred to Täby in 1963. Its prize was less than it had been previously, but it was raised again in 1975. The word "International" was added to its title in 1979.

The Stockholm Cup International was given Group 3 status in 1991. It was the first race in Scandinavia to be classed at this level. Täby Racecourse closed in May 2016 and the Stockholm Cup International was transferred to Täby's replacement, Bro Park, from the 2016 running.

== Records ==
Most successful horse since 1959 (4 wins):

- Bank of Burden - 2011, 2012, 2014, 2015

Leading jockey since 1959 (6 wins):

- Fredrik Johansson – Kill the Crab (1996), Valley Chapel (2001), Farouge (2005), Appel au Maitre (2007, 2008), Without Fear (2013)

Leading trainer since 1959 (8 wins):

- Niels Petersen – Bank of Burden (2011, 2012, 2014, 2015), Without Fear (2013), Square De Luynes (2019, 2020, 2021)

== Winners since 1985 ==
Year	Winner	Age	Jockey	Trainer	Time
1985	Tryffoc	4	Johan Stenström	Albert Klimscha, Jr.	2:35.70
1986	Top Guest	3	Philip Robinson	Geoff Wragg	2:31.90
1987	Keep Me Waiting	7	Johan Stenström	K. Tönnessen	2:39.30
1988	Call to Honor	5	Mikael Wiking	Pål Jørgen Nordbye	2:31.00
1989	Silvestro	4	Fernando Diaz	Terje Dahl	2:30.10
1990	Mawathik	3	Ole Larsen	Börje Olsson	2:42.20
1991	Feuerbach	8	John Reid	Elisabeth Gautier	2:30.70
1992	Silvestro	7	Kim Andersen	Terje Dahl	2:29.20
1993	Colon	4	Andreas Boschert	Andreas Wöhler	2:30.60
1994	Mr Eubanks	3	Susanne Berneklint	Michael Kahn	2:28.70
1995	Glide Path	6	Jason Weaver	John Hills	2:33.20
1996	Kill the Crab	4	Fredrik Johansson	Wido Neuroth	2:27.00
1997	Harbour Dues	4	Ray Cochrane	Lady Herries	2:35.40
1998	Inchrory	5	John McLaughlin	Are Hyldmo	2:39.90
1999	Albaran	6	Janos Tandari	Cathrine Erichsen	2:30.10
2000	Valley Chapel	4	Eddie Ahern	Wido Neuroth	2:27.70
2001	Valley Chapel	5	Fredrik Johansson	Wido Neuroth	2:40.30
2002	Dano-Mast	6	Frederick Sanchez	Flemming Poulsen	2:27.70
2003	Labirinto	5	Frédéric Spanu	Rod Collet	2:28.40
2004	Collier Hill	6	Dean McKeown	Alan Swinbank	2:27.80
2005	Farouge	4	Fredrik Johansson	Wido Neuroth	2:29.80
2006	Collier Hill	8	Dean McKeown	Alan Swinbank	2:33.50
2007	Appel au Maitre	3	Fredrik Johansson	Wido Neuroth	2:36.50
2008	Appel au Maitre	4	Fredrik Johansson	Wido Neuroth	2:34.90
2009	Touch of Hawk	3	L. Hammer-Hansen	Wido Neuroth	2:31.90
2010	Mores Wells	6	Sébastien Maillot	Richard Gibson	2:31.60
2011	Bank of Burden	4	Per-Anders Gråberg	Niels Petersen	2:31.50
2012	Bank of Burden	5	Per-Anders Gråberg	Niels Petersen	2:29.40
2013	Without Fear	5	Fredrik Johansson	Niels Petersen	2:28.70
2014	Bank of Burden	7	Per-Anders Gråberg	Niels Petersen	2:28.50
2015	Bank of Burden	8	Per-Anders Gråberg	Niels Petersen	2:38.10
2016	Quarterback	4	Carlos Lopez	Rune Haugen	2:25.40
2017	Dorcia	3	Per-Anders Graberg	Lennart Reuterskiold Jr	2:33.70
2018	Thundering Blue	5	Fran Berry	David Menuisier	2:28.40
2019	Square De Luynes	4	Robert Havlin	Niels Petersen	2:26.80
2020	Square De Luynes	5	Pat Cosgrave	Niels Petersen	2:29.10
2021	Square De Luynes	6	Pat Cosgrave	Niels Petersen	2:27.80
2022	Hard One To Please	3	Pat Cosgrave	Annike Bye Hansen	2:28.90
2023	Espen Hill	7	Madeleine Smith	Madeleine Smith	2:27.90
2024	Best Of Lips	6	Hugo Boutin	Andreas Suborics	2:27.20
2025	Nastaria	6	Jozef Bojko	Anna Schleusner-Fruhriep	2:29.40
2026	Schamyl	5	Nikolaj Stott	Jan-Erik Neuroth	2:29.10

== Earlier winners ==
- 1959: Orsini
- 1960–62: no race
- 1963: Camillo
- 1964: no race
- 1965: Romeo
- 1966: Pan
- 1967: Roman Tart
- 1968: Landru
- 1969: Scotch
- 1970: Clovenford
- 1971: Clovenford / Foghorn *
- 1972: Moon Crack
- 1973: Bill Waterhouse
- 1974: Niardo
- 1975: Tuloch
- 1976: Tuloch
- 1977: Brave Tudor
- 1978: Nicke
- 1979: Claddagh
- 1980: Nicke
- 1981: Russian George
- 1982: Shaftesbury
- 1983: Prima Voce
- 1984: Nicke

* The 1971 race was a dead-heat and has joint winners.

== See also ==
- List of Scandinavian flat horse races
- Recurring sporting events established in 1937 – this race is included under its original title, Grand Prix.
