= Stäketskogen Nature Reserve =

Nature reserve in Stockholm, Sweden

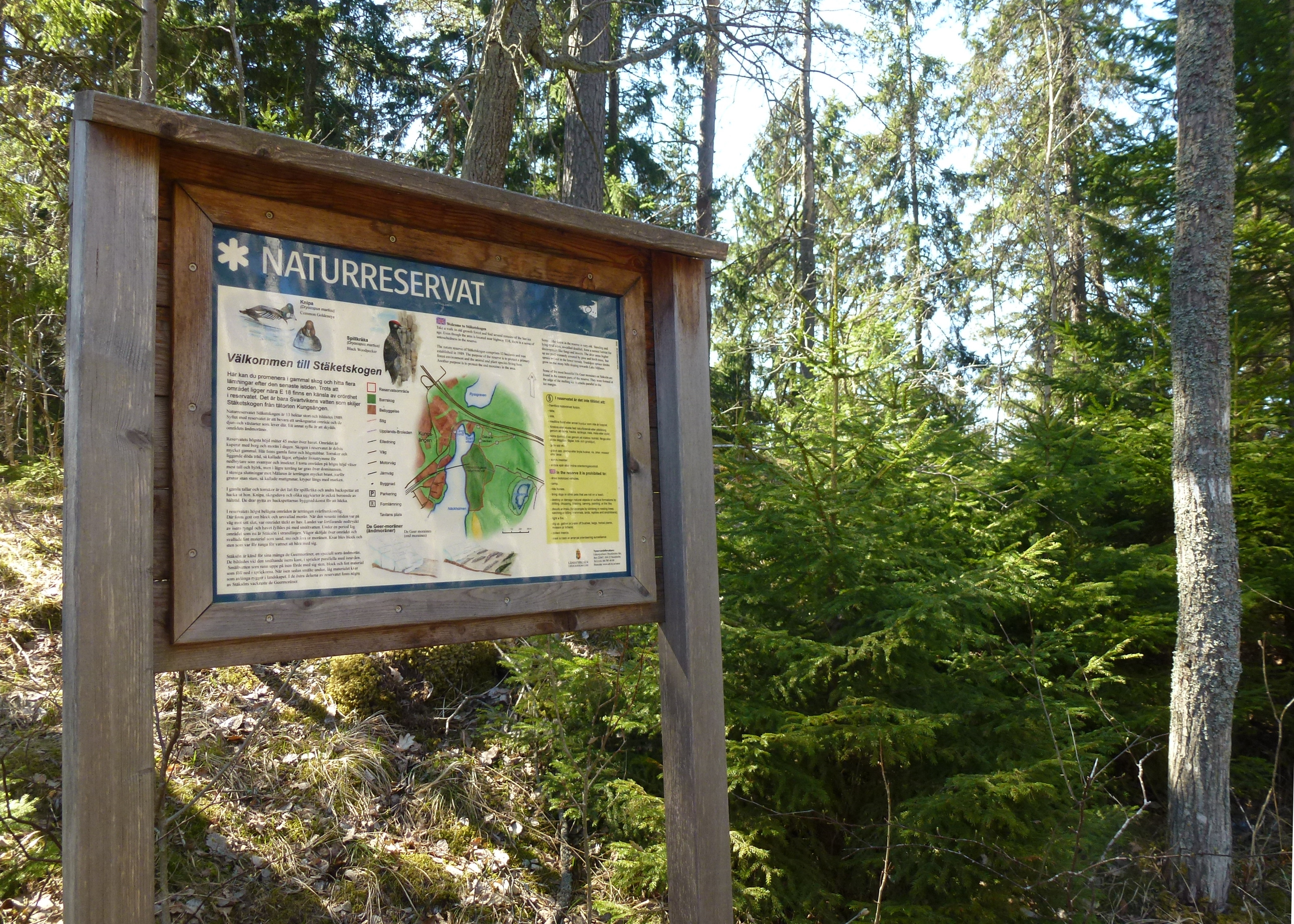

- Location within Stockholm
- Location: Sweden
- Coordinates: 59°28′47″N 17°45′48″E
- Area: 6,045 ha (14,940 acres)
- Established: 1989

Stäketskogen Nature Reserve (Swedish: Stäketskogens naturreservat) is a nature reserve in Upplands-Bro Municipality, Stockholm County in Sweden.

The nature reserve has been created to protect an area of old-growth mixed coniferous forest. The area is hilly, with glacial till, and has been subjected to a very low degree of forestry. It is a known habitat for several species of endangered insects and bracket fungi.
