= Oslo Cup =

Oslo Cup may refer to:

- Oslo Cup (curling), a curling tournament
- Oslo Cup (horserace), a horserace
