= Österhagen och Bergliden =

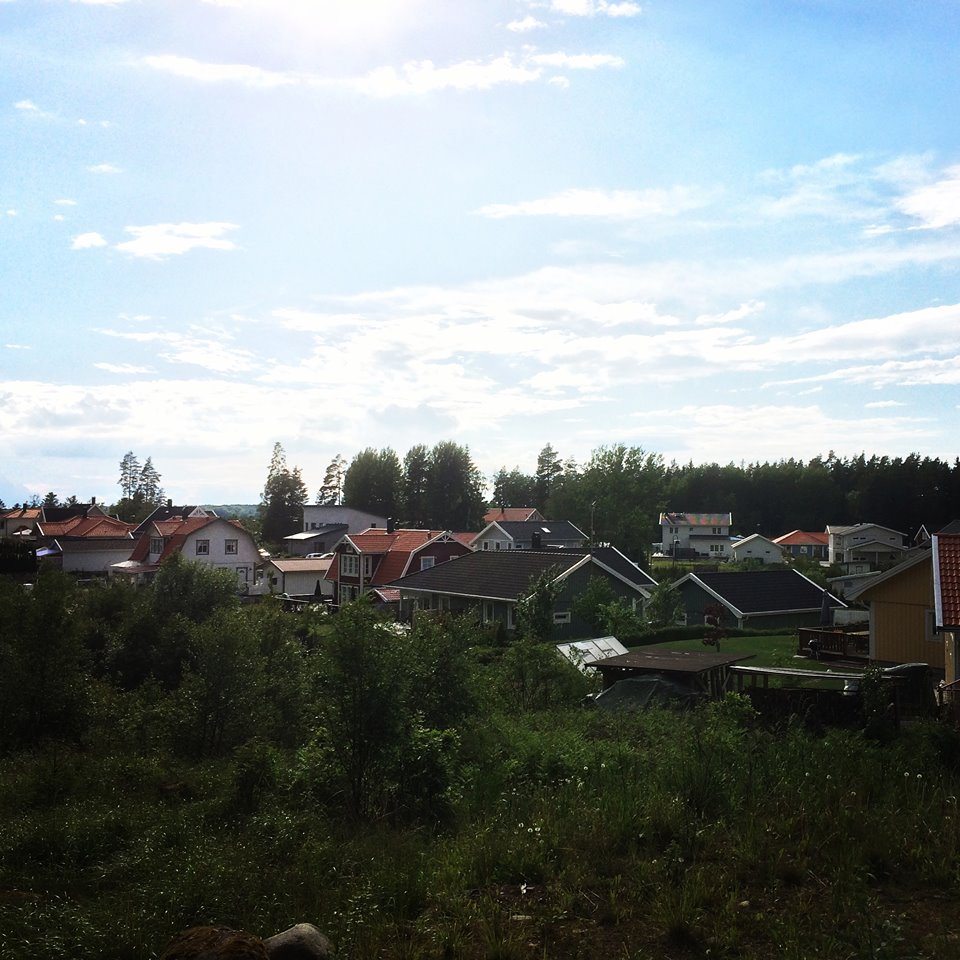
- Osterhahen

- Location within Stockholm Location within Sweden
- Coordinates: 59°30′30″N 17°40′00″E
- Country: Sweden
- Province: Uppland
- County: Stockholm County
- Municipality: Upplands-Bro Municipality

Area
  - Total: 0.22 km^{2} (0.085 sq mi)

Population (31 December 2010)
  - Total: 213
  - Density: 962/km^{2} (2,490/sq mi)
- Time zone: UTC+1 (CET)
  - Summer (DST): UTC+2 (CEST)

Österhagen och Bergliden (or simply Österhagen) is a locality situated in Upplands-Bro Municipality, Stockholm County, Sweden with 213 inhabitants in 2010.
