= Polar Cup =

Flat horse race in Norway

- Class: Listed
- Location: Øvrevoll Racecourse; Øvrevoll, Norway
- Race type: Flat / Thoroughbred
- Website: Øvrevoll

Race information
- Distance: 1,370 metres (6f 178y)
- Surface: Turf
- Track: Left-handed
- Qualification: Three-years-old and up
- Weight: 57 kg (3yo); 59 kg (4yo+); Allowances; 1½ kg for fillies and mares Penalties; 4 kg for Group 1 winners * 3 kg for Group 2 winners * 2 kg for Group 3 winners * * since January 1 last year
- Purse: 600,000 kr (2018); 1st: 300,000 kr

The Polar Cup is a Listed flat horse race in Norway open to thoroughbreds aged three years or older. It is run over a distance of 1,370 metres (6 furlongs and 178 yards) at Øvrevoll in late August.

== History ==
The event was formerly known as the Polar Million Cup. It used to have a prize fund of one million kroner. For a period it held Listed status.

The Polar Million Cup was promoted to Group 3 level in 2001. That year's edition was the first Group race to be staged in Norway. The country's second Group race, the Marit Sveaas Minneløp, was run later in the same month.

The title of the race was shortened to Polar Cup in 2003. From this point its prize money was less than a million kroner. It was downgraded to Listed level from the 2020 running.

== Records ==
Most successful horse (3 wins):

- Duca di Como - 2019, 2020, 2021
- Aphelios - 2024, 2025, 2026

Leading jockey since 1998 (5 wins):

- Elione Chaves - Duca di Como (2019, 2020, 2021), Aphelios (2024, 2025)

Leading trainer since 1998 (5 wins):

- Cathrine Erichsen - Hovman (2007), Easy Road (2015), Duca di Como (2019, 2020, 2021)
- Niels Petersen – You Never Know (2005), Silver Ocean (2012), Tinnitus (2017), Could Be King (2022), Let's Go Crazy (2023)
- Annike Bye Hansen – Ragazzo (2013, 2014), Aphelios (2024, 2025, 2026)

== Winners since 1998 ==
Year	Winner	Age	Jockey	Trainer	Time
1998	Shawdon	3	Olivier Doleuze	Michael Kahn	1:23.50
1999	Gaelic Storm	5	Darryll Holland	Mark Johnston	1:19.80
2000	Rolo Tomasi	4	Eddie Ahern	Wido Neuroth	1:23.20
2001	Waquaas	5	Gunnar Nordling	Ewy Nordling	1:20.00
2002	Aramus	5	David Sanchez	Francisco Castro	1:21.10
2003	King Quantas	5	Nicholas Cordrey	Olle Stenström	1:19.70
2004	Musadif	6	Yvonne Durant	Roy Arne Kvisla	1:19.10
2005	You Never Know	7	L. Hammer-Hansen	Niels Petersen	1:20.90
2006	Ricine	4	François-Xavier Bertras	François Rohaut	1:20.40
2007	Hovman	8	Luis Santos	Cathrine Erichsen	1:23.50
2008	Steve's Champ	8	Fernando Diaz	Rune Haugen	1:21.40
2009	Chicken Momo	3	Pascolina Pinto	Arnfinn Lund	1:24.60
2010	Alyshakeys	3	Manuel Santos	Wido Neuroth	1:24.40
2011	Giant Sandman	4	Rafael Schistl	Rune Haugen	1:20.60
2012	Silver Ocean	4	Per-Anders Gråberg	Niels Petersen	1:23.70
2013	Ragazzo	4	Espen Ski	Annike Bye Hansen	1:20.70
2014	Ragazzo	5	Jacob Johansen	Annike Bye Hansen	1:20.60
2015	Easy Road	5	Rafael de Oliveira	Cathrine Erichsen	1:22.30
2016	Brownie	4	Jacob Johansen	Bent Olsen	1:25.70
2017	Tinnitus	4	Pers-Anders Graberg	Niels Petersen	1:20.40
2018	Hakam	6	Luke Morris	Michael Appleby	1:19.90
2019	Duca di Como	4	Elione Chaves	Cathrine Erichsen	1:19.50
2020	Duca di Como	5	Elione Chaves	Cathrine Erichsen	1:19.60
2021	Duca di Como	6	Elione Chaves	Cathrine Erichsen	1:18.00
2022	Could Be King	6	Carlos Lopez	Niels Petersen	1:19.70
2023	Let's Go Crazy	4	Carlos Lopez	Niels Petersen	1:24.20
2024	Aphelios	5	Elione Chaves	Annika Bye Hansen	1:22.50
2025	Aphelios	6	Elione Chaves	Annika Bye Hansen	1:18.00
2026	Aphelios	7	Sandro De Paiva	Annika Bye Hansen	1:17.00

== See also ==
- List of Scandinavian flat horse races
