= List of Scandinavian flat horse races =

A list of notable flat horse races which take place annually in Scandinavia, including all conditions races which currently hold Group status in the European Pattern.

== Group 3 ==
Month	Race Name	Racecourse	Country	Dist. (m)	Age/Sex
June	Stockholms Stora Pris	Bro Park	Sweden	1,950	4yo+
August	Marit Sveaas Minneløp	Øvrevoll	Norway	1,800	3yo+
September	Stockholm Cup International	Bro Park	Sweden	2,400	3yo+

== Other races ==
Month	Race Name	Racecourse	Country	Dist. (m)	Age/Sex
May	Pramms Memorial	Jägersro	Sweden	1,730	4yo+
May	Scandinavian Open Championship	Klampenborg	Denmark	2,400	3yo+
July	Zawawi Cup	Jägersro	Sweden	1,200	3yo+
July / Aug	Polar Cup	Øvrevoll	Norway	1,370	3yo+
July / Aug	Oslo Cup	Øvrevoll	Norway	2,400	3yo+
August	Svenskt Derby	Jägersro	Sweden	2,400	3yo
August	Norsk Derby	Øvrevoll	Norway	2,400	3yo
September	Bro Park Sprint Championship	Bro Park	Sweden	1,150	3yo+
