= Gerling-Preis =

- Class: Group 2
- Location: Köln-Weidenpesch; Cologne, Germany
- Inaugurated: 1921
- Race type: Flat / Thoroughbred
- Sponsor: Gerling Group
- Website: Köln-Weidenpesch

Race information
- Distance: 2,400 metres (1½ miles)
- Surface: Turf
- Track: Right-handed
- Qualification: Four-years-old and up
- Weight: 57 kg Allowances; 1½ kg for fillies and mares Penalties; 3 kg for Group 1 winners * 1½ kg for Group 2 winners * * since January 1 last year
- Purse: €70,000 (2022); 1st: €40,000

The Gerling-Preis is a Group 2 flat horse race in Germany open to thoroughbreds aged four years or older. It is run over a distance of 2,400 metres (about 1½ miles) at Cologne in late April or early May.

== History ==
The event was established in 1921, and it was originally called the Preis von Birlinghoven. Its distance frequently changed during the early part of its history.

Robert Gerling, an insurance entrepreneur, became the sponsor of the race in 1934. From this point it was known as the Gerling-Preis.

The race began its current period over 2,400 metres in 1969. It held Group 3 status from 1972 to 1974, and from 1984 to 1988. It was raised to Group 2 level in 1989.

The Gerling-Preis is Germany's oldest surviving sponsored horse race.

The race renamed to Carl Jaspers-Preis in 2019

== Records ==
Most successful horse (2 wins):

- Niederländer – 1951, 1952
- Lombard – 1971, 1972
- Orofino – 1982, 1983
- Acatenango – 1986, 1987
- Monsun – 1994, 1995
- Alleno - 2025, 2026

Leading jockey (6 wins):

- Johannes Starosta – Organdy (1941), Witterung (1956), Waidmann (1963), Spielhahn (1964), Wiesenklee (1965), Tajo (1969)

Leading trainer (12 wins):

- Heinz Jentzsch – Basalt (1970), Lombard (1971, 1972), Sebastiano (1974), Ebano (1978), Aschanti (1979), Abary (1984), Acatenango (1986, 1987), Monsun (1994, 1995), Laroche (1996)

== Winners since 1970 ==
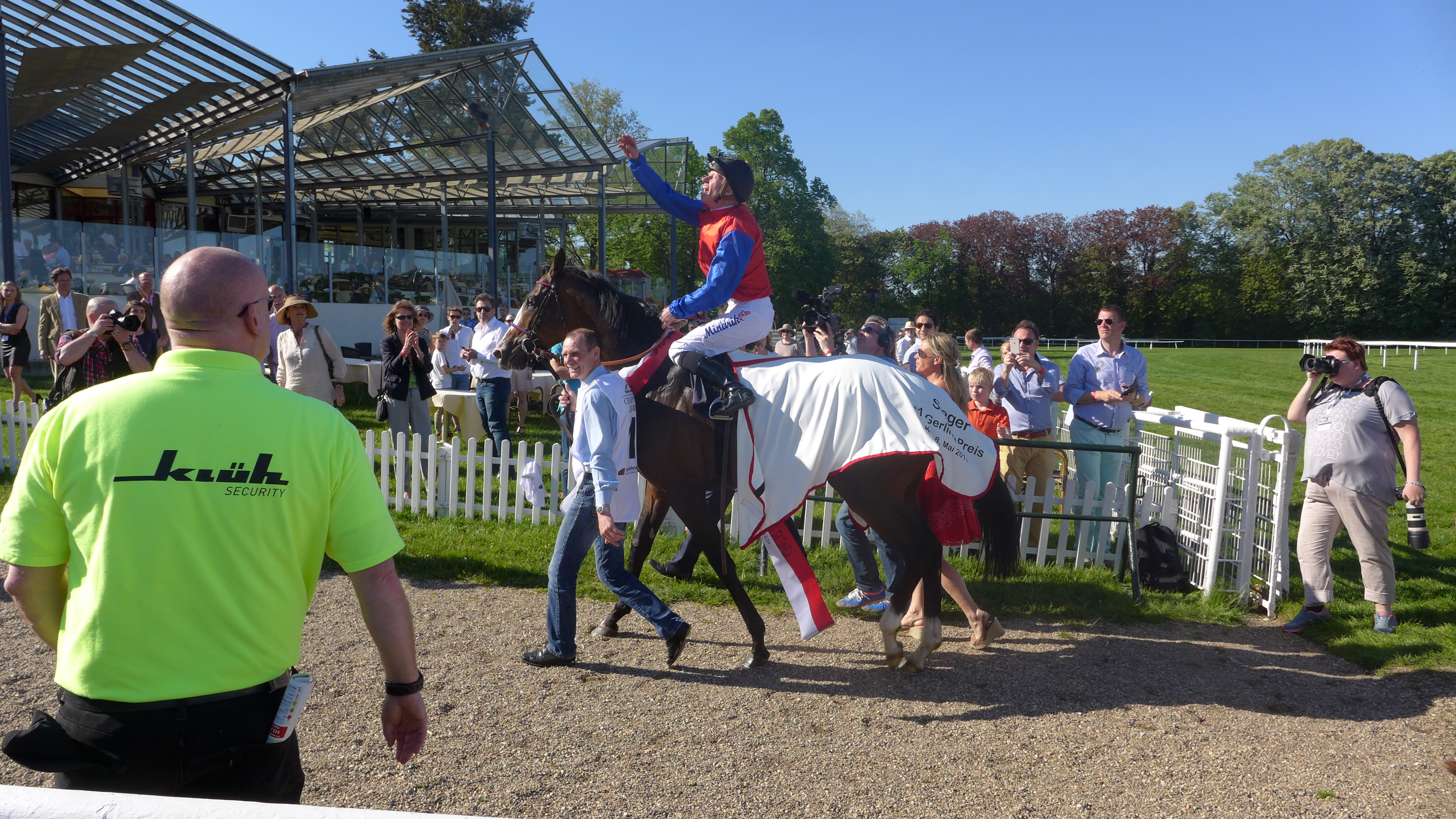
Ito after winning the 81st Gerling Prize 2016

Year	Winner	Age	Jockey	Trainer	Time
1970	Basalt	4	Fritz Drechsler	Heinz Jentzsch	2:44.20
1971	Lombard	4	Horst Horwart	Heinz Jentzsch	2:31.40
1972	Lombard	5	Fritz Drechsler	Heinz Jentzsch	2:30.90
1973	Caracol	4	Harro Remmert	Sven von Mitzlaff	2:31.90
1974	Sebastiano	4	Ralf Suerland	Heinz Jentzsch	2:31.80
1975	Lord Udo	4	Edward Hide	Theo Grieper	2:32.80
1976	My Brief	7	Manfred Kosman	Theo Grieper	2:30.50
1977	Windwurf	5	Geoff Lewis	Heinz Gummelt	2:36.20
1978	Ebano	5	Ralf Suerland	Heinz Jentzsch	2:34.60
1979	Aschanti	4	Joan Pall	Heinz Jentzsch	2:37.60
1980	Nebos	4	Lutz Mäder	Hein Bollow	2:34.60
1981	Wauthi	4	Peter Remmert	Theo Grieper	2:36.00
1982	Orofino	4	Peter Alafi	Sven von Mitzlaff	2:29.10
1983	Orofino	5	Peter Alafi	Sven von Mitzlaff	2:39.80
1984	Abary	4	Georg Bocskai	Heinz Jentzsch	2:36.60
1985	Ordos	5	Peter Alafi	Sven von Mitzlaff	2:31.70
1986	Acatenango	4	Georg Bocskai	Heinz Jentzsch	2:34.40
1987	Acatenango	5	Georg Bocskai	Heinz Jentzsch	2:29.30
1988	Wildvogel	5	Georg Bocskai	Wido Neuroth	2:28.11
1989	Luigi	4	Billy Newnes	Uwe Ostmann	2:35.76
1990	Mondrian	4	Kevin Woodburn	Uwe Stoltefuss	2:27.65
1991	Taishan	5	Dragan Ilic	Raimund Prinzinger	2:35.66
1992	Lomitas	4	Andreas Boschert	Andreas Wöhler	2:34.73
1993	Protektor	4	Terence Hellier	Andreas Löwe	2:31.45
1994	Monsun	4	Andrzej Tylicki	Heinz Jentzsch	2:34.11
1995	Monsun	5	Peter Schiergen	Heinz Jentzsch	2:32.20
1996	Laroche	5	L. Hammer-Hansen	Heinz Jentzsch	2:29.88
1997	Wurftaube	4	Kevin Woodburn	Harro Remmert	2:28.64
1998	Ferrari	4	Andreas Suborics	Peter Lautner	2:36.28
1999	Tiger Hill	4	Andreas Suborics	Peter Schiergen	2:26.57
2000	Catella	4	Terence Hellier	Peter Schiergen	2:30.33
2001	Subiaco	4	Frankie Dettori	Andreas Schütz	2:39.25
2002	Well Made	5	L. Hammer-Hansen	Hans Blume	2:36.48
2003	Aolus	4	Andrasch Starke	Andreas Schütz	2:27.58
2004	Olaso	5	Andrasch Starke	Pavel Vovcenko	2:30.89
2005	Collier Hill	7	Dean McKeown	Alan Swinbank	2:34.29
2006	All Spirit	4	Eduardo Pedroza	Norbert Sauer	2:37.50
2007	Saddex	4	Eduardo Pedroza	Peter Rau	2:30.57
2008	Oriental Tiger	5	Terence Hellier	Uwe Ostmann	2:26.44
2009	Kamsin	4	Andrasch Starke	Peter Schiergen	2:31.18
2010	Eye of the Tiger	5	Terence Hellier	Jens Hirschberger	2:31.95
2011	Scalo	4	Frankie Dettori	Andreas Wöhler	2:29.22
2012	Atempo	4	Adrie de Vries	Jens Hirschberger	2:30.91
2013	Girolamo	4	Andrasch Starke	Peter Schiergen	2:32.71
2014	Ivanhowe	4	Adrie de Vries	Jean-Pierre Carvalho	2:30.09
2015	Guardini	4	Filip Minarik	Jean-Pierre Carvalho	2:28.52
2016	Ito	5	Filip Minarik	Jean-Pierre Carvalho	2:25.33
2017	Dschingis Secret	4	Adrie de Vries	Markus Klug	2:29.47
2018	Oriental Eagle	4	Lukas Delozier	Jens Hirschberger	2:22.60
2019	French King	4	Olivier Peslier	Henri-Alex Pantall	2:31.62
2020	Be My Sheriff	6	Andrasch Starke	Henk Grewe	2:26.53
2021	Nerium	4	Bauyrzhan Murzabayev	Peter Schiergen	2:34.14
2022	Dato	6	Bayarsaikhan Ganbat	Sascha Smrczek	2:31.55
2023	Assistent	4	Lukas Delozier	Henk Grewe	2:33.13
2024	Lordano	5	Rene Piechulek	Marcel Weiss	2:38.40
2025	Alleno	4	Sibylle Vogt	Marcel Weiss	2:32.20
2026	Alleno	5	Sibylle Vogt	Marcel Weiss	2:27.27

== Earlier winners ==
- 1921: Liebhaber
- 1922: Meergeist
- 1923: Puella
- 1924: Hausfreund
- 1925: Salzig
- 1926: Kabristan
- 1927: Freigeist
- 1928: Meteor
- 1929: Truchsess
- 1930–33: no race
- 1934: Airolo
- 1935: Athanasius
- 1936: Elanus
- 1937: Burgunder
- 1938: Walzerkönig
- 1939: Panheros
- 1940: Graf Alten
- 1941: Organdy
- 1942: Lockfalke
- 1943: Coroner
- 1944: Patrizier
- 1945–46: no race
- 1947: Oberst
- 1948: Angeber
- 1949: Aubergine
- 1950: Astral
- 1951: Niederländer
- 1952: Niederländer
- 1953: Salut
- 1954: Baal
- 1955: Mio
- 1956: Witterung
- 1957: Windfang
- 1958: Utrillo
- 1959: Sommerblume
- 1960: Adlon
- 1961: Alarich
- 1962: Amboss
- 1963: Waidmann
- 1964: Spielhahn
- 1965: Wiesenklee
- 1966: Marinus
- 1967: Goldbube
- 1968: Ilix
- 1969: Tajo

== See also ==
- List of German flat horse races
- Recurring sporting events established in 1921 – this race is included under its original title, Preis von Birlinghoven.
