= Klampenborg Racecourse =

Horse racing venue in Copenhagen, Denmark

Coordinates: 55.7730°N 12.5717°E

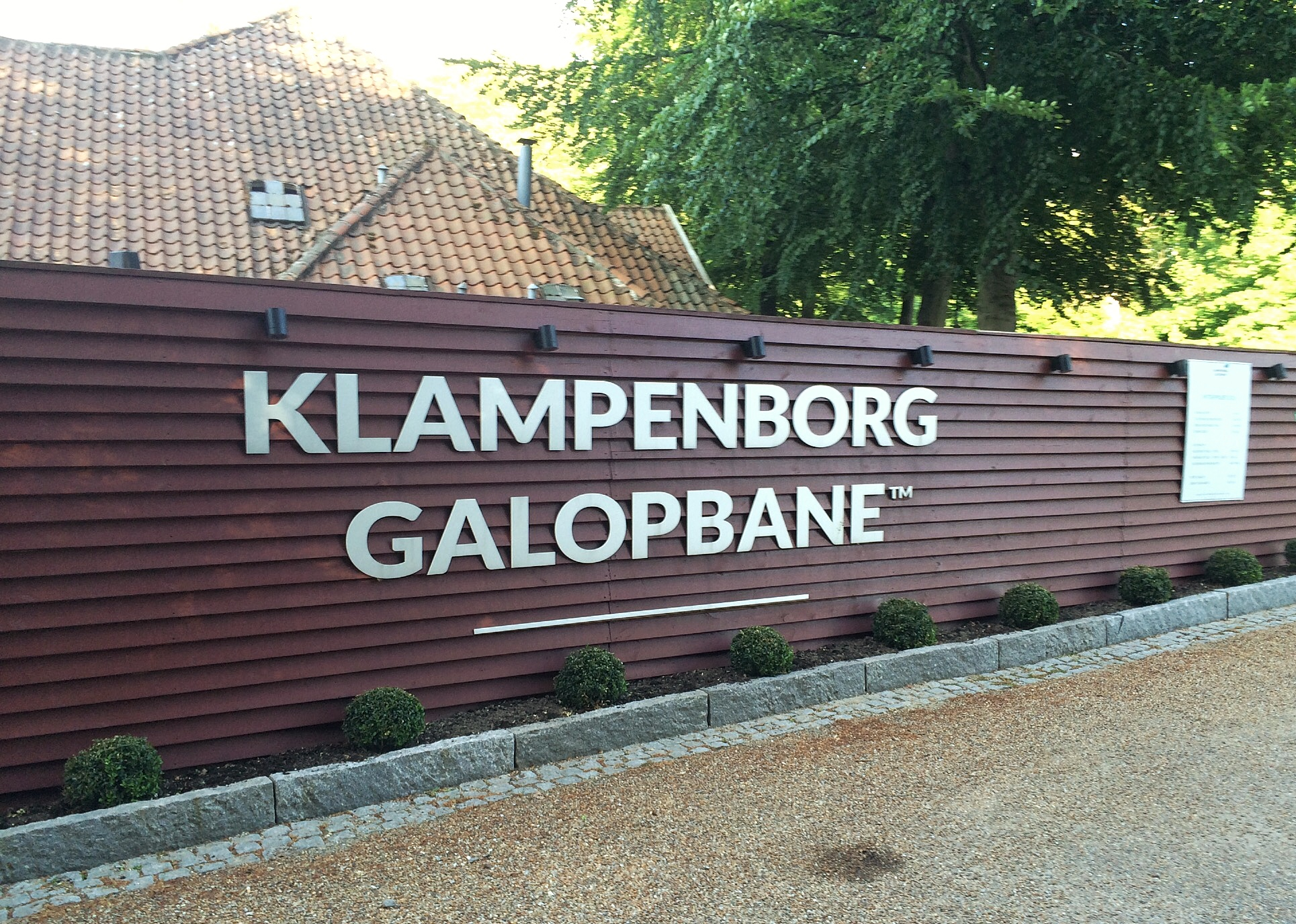
- Interactive map of Klampenborg Racecourse
- Location: Klampenborg, Copenhagen, Denmark
- Course type: Flat
- Notable races: Scandinavian Open Championship

Klampenborg Racecourse (Danish: Klampenborg Galopbane) is a flat horse racing track in Klampenborg in the northern suburbs of Copenhagen, Denmark.

== History ==
The first organized horse races in Denmark were held in Copenhagen in 1770 at the initiative of the British born queen Caroline Mathilde. Regular horse races took places at Copenhagen's Nørre Fælled from the 1820s. The races were moved to the Hermitage Plain in Jægersborg Dyrehave in 1870. The first race there took place on 15 June.

Klampenborg Racetracks (then Klampenborg Væddeløbsbane) was inaugurated in 1910. It was owned by the Association for the Promotion of the Noble Horse Breeding (Foreningen til den Ædle Hesteavls Fremme). It is believed that the tribune was moved from the Exposition Universelle in Paris in 1906.

== Racecourse ==
The racecourse is located adjacent to Jægersborg Dyrehave. The racecourse is circa 2.400 m long. A new tribune designed by Dissing + Weitling was inaugurated in 2000.

== Major events ==
Major races include Scandinavian Open Championship, Dansk Derby and Dansk Oaks.

== Cultural references ==
Klampenborg Racecourse has been used as a film location in the following films:

- Plat eller krone (1937)
- Det store løb (1952)
- Kampen om Næsbygård (1964)
- Krybskytterne paa Næsbygaard (1966)
- Rainfox (1984)
- Krummerne 2 - Stakkels Krumme (1992)
