= Scandinavian Open Championship =

Flat horse race in Denmark

- Class: Listed
- Location: Klampenborg Racecourse; Klampenborg, Denmark
- Inaugurated: 1996
- Race type: Flat / Thoroughbred
- Sponsor: Scanvet Stallions
- Website: Klampenborg

Race information
- Distance: 2,400 metres (1½ miles)
- Surface: Turf
- Track: Right-handed
- Qualification: Three-years-old and up
- Weight: 53 kg (3yo); 58 kg (4yo+); Allowances; 1½ kg for fillies and mares Penalties; 3 kg for Group 1 winners * 2 kg for Group 2 winners * 1 kg for Group 3 winners * * since January 1 last year
- Purse: 450,000 kr (2017); 1st: 250,000 kr

The Scandinavian Open Championship is a Listed flat horse race in Denmark open to thoroughbreds aged three years or older. It is run over a distance of 2,400 metres (about 1½ miles) at Klampenborg in late May.

== History ==
The event was first run with its present title in 1977 & 1978 then reintroduced in 1996. It replaced the Dansk Eclipse Stakes, Denmark's version of the Eclipse Stakes.

For a period the Scandinavian Open Championship held Listed status. It was promoted to Group 3 level in 2000. That year's running was the first Group race to be staged in Denmark. It was downgraded to Listed status in 2026. The 2014 and 2015 renewals took place in June.

== Records ==
Most successful horse (3 wins):

- Suspicious Mind - 2020, 2021, 2022

Leading jockey (7 wins):

- Per-Anders Gråberg – Equip Hill (2007), Bank of Burden (2012, 2013), Suspicious Mind (2020, 2021, 2022), Greenland (2024)

Leading trainer (3 wins):

- Cathrine Erichsen – Albaran (1998, 1999), Master Bloom (2019)
- Niels Petersen – Bank of Burden (2012, 2013), Without Fear (2014)
- Nina Lensvik - Suspicious Mind (2020, 2021, 2022)

== Winners ==
Year	Winner	Age	Jockey	Trainer	Time
1977	Trainer's Seat(IRE)	4	Lester Piggott	Terje Dahl	?
1978	Pollerton(GB)	4	Lester Piggott	Harry Thomson Jones	?
1996	Federico	4	Kim Andersen	Søren Jensen	2:26.00
1997	Harbour Dues	4	Pat Eddery	Lady Herries	2:26.20
1998	Albaran	5	Janos Tandari	Cathrine Erichsen	2:29.40
1999	Albaran	6	Janos Tandari	Cathrine Erichsen	2:25.00
2000	Montalban	4	L. Hammer-Hansen	Andreas Löwe	2:28.20
2001	Valley Chapel	5	Fredrik Johansson	Wido Neuroth	2:28.10
2002	Valley Chapel	6	Fredrik Johansson	Wido Neuroth	2:29.80
2003	Dano-Mast	7	Terence Hellier	Flemming Poulsen	2:29.90
2004	Crocodile Dundee	3	John Egan	Jamie Poulton	2:26.80
2005	Alpino Chileno	6	Carlos Lopez	Rune Haugen	2:29.40
2006	Halfsong	6	Sara Slot	Karl Peter Andersen	2:28.90
2007	Equip Hill	5	Per-Anders Gråberg	Bendik Bö	2:31.20
2008	Chinese Mandarin	5	Nicholas Cordrey	Erna van Doorn	2:26.00
2009	Peas and Carrots	6	Fredrik Johansson	Lennart Reuterskiöld, Jr.	2:29.80
2010	Django	7	L. Hammer-Hansen	Jessica Long	2:25.60
2011	Ovambo Queen	4	Gaetan Masure	Dr Andreas Bolte	2:31.30
2012	Bank of Burden	5	Per-Anders Gråberg	Niels Petersen	2:23.00
2013	Bank of Burden	6	Per-Anders Gråberg	Niels Petersen	2:23.60
2014	Without Fear	6	Rafael Schistl	Niels Petersen	2:30.80
2015	Berling	8	Dina Danekilde	Jessica Long	2:27.10
2016	Quarterback	4	Jan-Erik Neuroth	Rune Haugen	2:28.00
2017	Giuseppe Piazzi	5	Oliver Wilson	Flemming Velin	2:33.70
2018	Efesos	5	Manuel G Martinez	Bent Olsen	2:31.00
2019	Master Bloom	4	Carlos Lopez	Cathrine Erichsen	2:32.50
2020	Suspicious Mind	7	Per-Anders Graberg	Nina Lensvik	2:24.10
2021	Suspicious Mind	8	Per-Anders Graberg	Nina Lensvik	2:26.70
2022	Suspicious Mind	9	Per-Anders Graberg	Nina Lensvik	2:33.30
2023	Go On Carlras	5	Nikolaj Stott	Rikke Rohbach Bonde	2:24.60
2024	Greenland	4	Per-Anders Gråberg	Flemming Velin	2:25.80
2025	Ami De Vega	5	Sandro De Paiva	Jan-Erik Neuroth	2:27.10
2026	Ami De Vega	6	Oliver Wilson	Jan-Erik Neuroth	2:30.00

== Dansk Eclipse Stakes ==
The Dansk Eclipse Stakes was the precursor of the Scandinavian Open Championship. It was last run in 1995.

- 1987: Obidos
- 1988: Sunset Boulevard
- 1989: Sunset Boulevard
- 1990: Icemood
- 1991: Silvestro
- 1992: Silvestro
- 1993: Kateb
- 1994: Kateb
- 1995: Matahif

== See also ==
- List of Scandinavian flat horse races
