= Dean McKeown =

British jockey

Personal information
- Born: 5 February 1960 (age 66) United Kingdom
- Occupation: Jockey

Horse racing career
- Sport: Horse racing

Major racing wins
- Cambridgeshire Handicap (1987, 1989, 1992); Queen Mary Stakes (1990); Queen Alexandra Stakes (1990); Princess Margaret Stakes (1992); Ebor Handicap (1992, 2002); Vintage Stakes (1993); Great St. Wilfrid Stakes (1997); Beeswing Stakes (1997); Chipchase Stakes (2002); Chester Cup (2003); Irish St. Leger (2005) International race wins: Stockholm Cup International (2004, 2006); Gerling-Preis (2005); Canadian International Stakes (2006); Hong Kong Vase (2006)

Racing awards
- Griffins Richard Davis Award (1999)

Significant horses
- Hugs Dancer, Collier Hill

Dean Russell McKeown (born 5 February 1960) is a retired British Thoroughbred horse racing jockey. He embarked on his professional career as a teenager, earning his first win in 1977. While never a Champion jockey, McKeown has won a number of important Conditions races in the United Kingdom including three editions of the Cambridgeshire Handicap at Newmarket Racecourse. He also won the Ebor Handicap (2002) and Chester Cup (2003) aboard Hugs Dancer then in the fall of 2004 became the regular jockey for trainer Alan Swinbank where he became an integral part of the racing success of Collier Hill. Throughout his career he earned a reputation for being one of the most astute form judges in the weighing-room.

Riding Collier Hill, McKeown won a number of major international races, including the 2005 Group 2 Gerling-Preis in Cologne, Germany, the C$2 million Grade 1 Canadian International at Woodbine Racetrack in Canada, and the HK$14 million Hong Kong Vase in Hong Kong, China.

Dean has found himself in hot water after being found in breach of the non-trier's rule (rule 157) at Southwell on Tuesday, 4 November 2008. McKeown was found guilty after his ride on Rascal In The Mix in the 1.30 maiden auction stakes finished unplaced having attracted significant market support before drifting.

== Family ==
Dean McKeown has three daughters: Lauren, Hayley and Frankie
