= Brunna =

- Location within Stockholm Location within Sweden Location within European Union
- Coordinates: 59°30′N 17°45′E
- Country: Sweden
- Province: Uppland
- County: Stockholm County
- Municipality: Upplands-Bro Municipality

Area
  - Total: 1.77 km^{2} (0.68 sq mi)

Population (31 December 2020)
  - Total: 4,033
  - Density: 2,280/km^{2} (5,900/sq mi)
- Time zone: UTC+1 (CET)
  - Summer (DST): UTC+2 (CEST)

Brunna is a locality and a suburb of Metropolitan Stockholm situated in Upplands-Bro Municipality, Stockholm County, Sweden with 3,925 inhabitants in 2010.
