= Dano-Mast =

British-bred Thoroughbred racehorse

- Sire: Unfuwain
- Grandsire: Northern Dancer
- Dam: Camera Girl
- Damsire: Kalaglow
- Sex: Stallion
- Foaled: 1996
- Country: Great Britain
- Colour: Bay
- Breeder: Mr. & Mrs. Peter D. Player
- Owner: Stald Composit
- Trainer: Flemming Poulsen
- Record: 32: 11-4-5
- Earnings: €621,925

Major wins
- Prix Jean de Chaudenay (2001); Prix Dollar (2002); Stockholm Cup International (2002); Scandinavian Open Championship (2003)
- Last updated on July 24, 2007

Dano-Mast (born 1996) is a thoroughbred racehorse, bought at the October 1997 sale for year old horses at Newmarket, England, for 10000 pounds. Dano-Mast did not race as a 2 year old, but showed talent when winning a maiden race by more than 20 lengths in his second appearance in a full season, which was later followed up by runner-up performances in both the Danish and Swedish Derby.

During the next three seasons Dano-Mast developed into a world-class performer, winning the Prix Jean de Chaudenay at Saint-Cloud and the Group 2 Prix Dollar at Longchamp, both racecourses situated in Paris. The horse made his career-best effort in the 2002 Hong Kong Cup at Sha Tin Racecourse, finishing third behind local hero Precision and German raider Paolini.

By the end of 2003, Dano-Mast was moved to France along with life-time companion trainer Flemming Poulsen, where he is still in training and occasional competition. A stud career awaits Dano-Mast once retired from the racing scene.
