= Terje Dahl =

Norwegian jockey and horse trainer

Personal information
- Born: 25 November 1935
- Died: 10 February 2017 (aged 81)

Sport
- Country: Norway
- Sport: Horse racing

Terje Dahl (25 November 1935 – 10 February 2017) was a Norwegian jockey and horse trainer who competed from the 1950s.

== Career ==
Dahl won about 300 races in European countries and achieved 13 championnats (most wins during a season) in steeplechase racing in Norway, Denmark and Sweden. As horse trainer he achieved ten championnats at Øvrevoll between 1974 and 1986.

His horses recorded 948 victories at Øvrevoll. His most successful horse was Noble Dancer, which he trained for two seasons, and is regarded the all-time best Thoroughbred horse in Norway. Noble Dancer's victories at Øvrevoll included Oslo Cup 1975 and 1976, and other races. The horse was then moved to US, where it was trained by Thomas Joseph Kelly, and competed with success in top level races. His results included victories in Hialeah Turf Cup Handicap (1978), San Luis Rey Handicap (1978 and 1979, then Gr. 1), and United Nations Stakes (1978, 1979), ending his career after a leg injury in October 1979, having earned a total of $945,893.

== Personal life ==
A son of Gudrun Dahl, Dahl grew up in the borough of Heggeli in Oslo. He married singer Kirsti Sparboe in 1989, having lived together since 1979. He died on 10 February 2017, 81 years old. A race at Øvrevoll ("Terje Dahl Champion Hurdle") has been named after him.
