= Hong Kong Vase =

Longines Hong Kong Vase
- Class: Group 1
- Location: Sha Tin Racecourse; Hong Kong, China
- Inaugurated: 1994
- Race type: Flat / Thoroughbred
- Sponsor: Longines
- Website: Hong Kong Jockey Club

Race information
- Distance: 2,400 metres (1.5 miles)
- Surface: Turf
- Track: Right-handed
- Qualification: Three-years-old and up
- Weight: 121 lb (3y); 126 lb (4y+); Allowances; 4 lb for fillies and mares
- Purse: HK$24,000,000 (2023); 1st: HK$13,440,000

The Hong Kong Vase is a Group 1 flat horse race in Hong Kong which is open to thoroughbreds aged three years or older. It is run each year in mid-December over a distance of 2,400 metres (about 1 1/2 miles or 12 furlongs) at Sha Tin.

The race was first run in 1994, and was promoted to Group 1 status in 2000. It is one of the four Hong Kong International Races, presently offering a purse of HK$24,000,000 (approximately US$3 million).

== Records ==
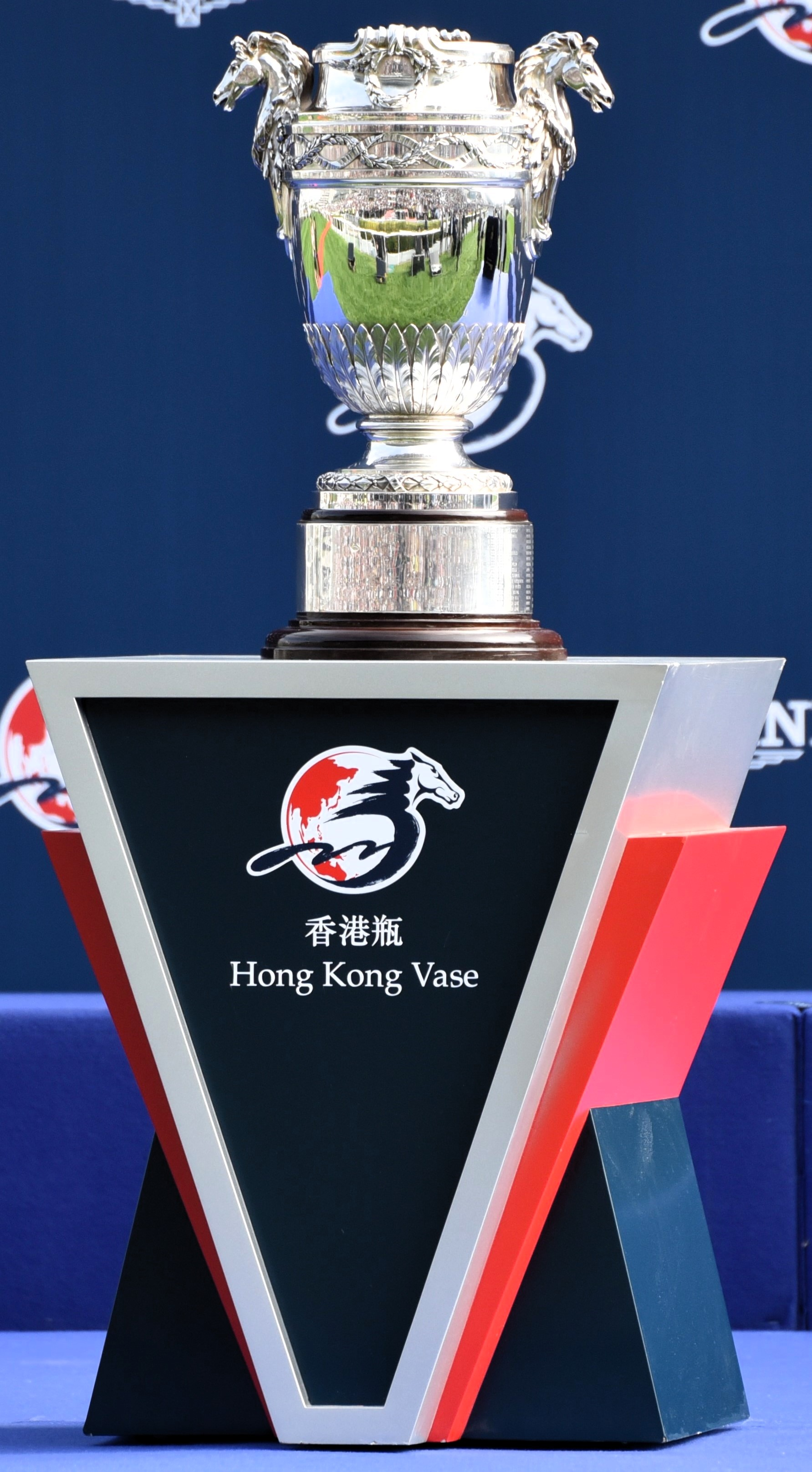
Trophy of the Hong Kong Vase

Speed record:

- 2:24.77 – Glory Vase (2019)

Most wins:

- 2 – Luso (1996, 1997)
- 2 – Doctor Dino (2007, 2008)
- 2 – Highland Reel (2015, 2017)
- 2 – Glory Vase (2019, 2021)

Most wins by a jockey:

- 4 – Olivier Peslier (1995, 1999, 2007, 2008)

Most wins by a trainer:

- 4 – André Fabre (1999, 2014, 2023, 2025)

Most wins by an owner:

- 3 – Derrick Smith, Susan Magnier & Michael Tabor (2015, 2017, 2020)

== Winners ==
Year	Winner	Age	Jockey	Trainer (Trained In)	Owner	Time
1994	Red Bishop	6	Cash Asmussen	John Hammond (France)	Ali Saeed	2:25.10
1995	Partipral	6	Olivier Peslier	Élie Lellouche (France)	Enrique Sarasola	2:25.70
1996	Luso	4	Frankie Dettori	Clive Brittain (Great Britain)	Saeed Manana	2:26.10
1997	Luso	5	Michael Kinane	Clive Brittain (Great Britain)	Saeed Manana	2:26.30
1998	Indigenous	5	Douglas Whyte	Ivan W. Allan (Hong Kong)	Pang Yuen Hing	2:27.40
1999	Borgia	5	Olivier Peslier	André Fabre (France)	Gestüt Ammerland	2:30.10
2000	Daliapour	4	Johnny Murtagh	Sir Michael Stoute (Great Britain)	Lucky Stable	2:28.20
2001	Stay Gold	7	Yutaka Take	Yasuo Ikee (Japan)	Shadai Racehorse Co.	2:27.80
2002	Ange Gabriel	4	Thierry Jarnet	Eric Libaud (France)	Antonia Devin	2:28.40
2003	Vallee Enchantee	3	Dominique Boeuf	Élie Lellouche (France)	Ecurie Wildenstein	2:28.20
2004	Phoenix Reach	4	Martin Dwyer	Andrew Balding (Great Britain)	Winterbeck Manor Stud	2:29.80
2005	Ouija Board	4	Kieren Fallon	Ed Dunlop (Great Britain)	19th Earl of Derby	2:28.90
2006	Collier Hill	8	Dean McKeown	Alan Swinbank (Great Britain)	Russell Hall et al.	2:27.10
2007	Doctor Dino	5	Olivier Peslier	Richard Gibson (France)	Javier Martinez Salmean	2:28.20
2008	Doctor Dino	6	Olivier Peslier	Richard Gibson (France)	Javier Martinez Salmean	2:29.14
2009	Daryakana	3	Gérald Mossé	Alain de Royer-Dupré (France)	HH Aga Khan IV	2:27.51
2010	Mastery	4	Frankie Dettori	Saeed bin Suroor (UAE)	Godolphin	2:27.69
2011	Dunaden	6	Craig Williams	Mikel Delzangles (France)	Pearl Bloodstock	2:27.50
2012	Red Cadeaux	6	Gérald Mossé	Ed Dunlop (Great Britain)	R J Arculli	2:28.73
2013	Dominant	6	Zac Purton	John Moore (Hong Kong)	10/11 John Moore Trainer Syndicate	2:27.29
2014	Flintshire	4	Maxime Guyon	André Fabre (France)	Khalid Abdullah	2:29.83
2015	Highland Reel	3	Ryan Moore	Aidan O'Brien (Ireland)	Smith, Magnier & Tabor	2:28.43
2016	Satono Crown	4	João Moreira	Noriyuki Hori (Japan)	Hajime Satomi	2:26.22
2017	Highland Reel	5	Ryan Moore	Aidan O'Brien (Ireland)	Smith, Magnier & Tabor	2:26.23
2018	Exultant	4	Zac Purton	Tony Cruz (Hong Kong)	Eddie Wong Ming Chak & Wong Leung Sau Hing	2:26.56
2019	Glory Vase	4	João Moreira	Tomohito Ozeki (Japan)	Silk Racing Co Ltd	2:24.77
2020	Mogul	3	Ryan Moore	Aidan O'Brien (Ireland)	Michael Tabor, Derrick Smith & Susan Magnier	2:27.21
2021	Glory Vase	6	João Moreira	Tomohito Ozeki (Japan)	Silk Racing Co Ltd	2:27.07
2022	Win Marilyn	5	Damian Lane	Takahisa Tezuka (Japan)	Win Co Ltd	2:27.53
2023	Junko	4	Maxime Guyon	André Fabre (France)	Wertheimer et Frère	2:30.12
2024	Giavellotto	5	Oisin Murphy	Marco Botti (Great Britain)	Scuderia La Tesa Limited & Vaibhav Shah	2:27.53
2025	Sosie	4	Maxime Guyon	André Fabre (France)	Wertheimer et Frère	2:28.50

== See also ==
- List of Hong Kong horse races
