= Täby Racecourse =

Former racecourse in Sweden

Coordinates: 59°26′32″N 18°04′51″E

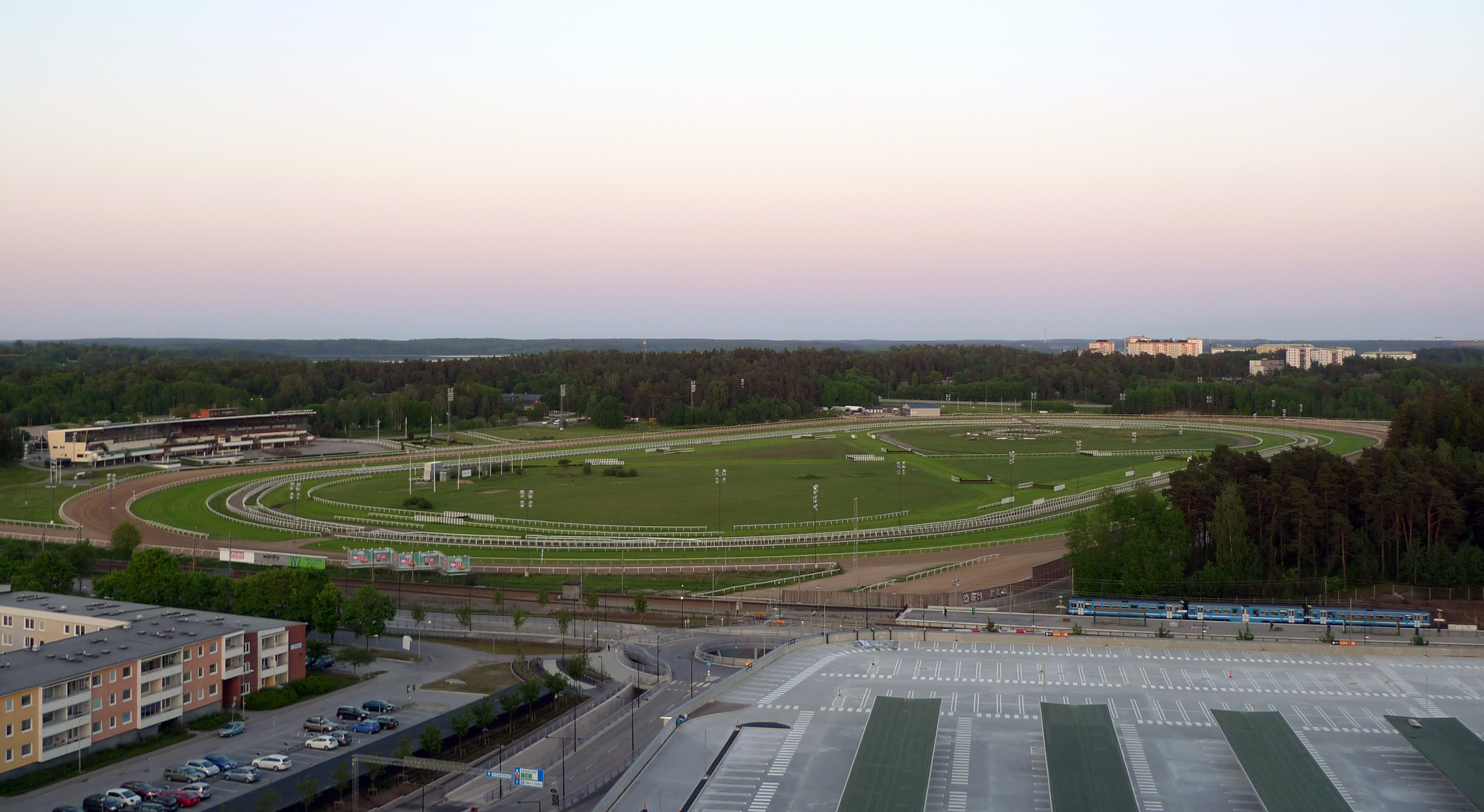
Täby Galopp.

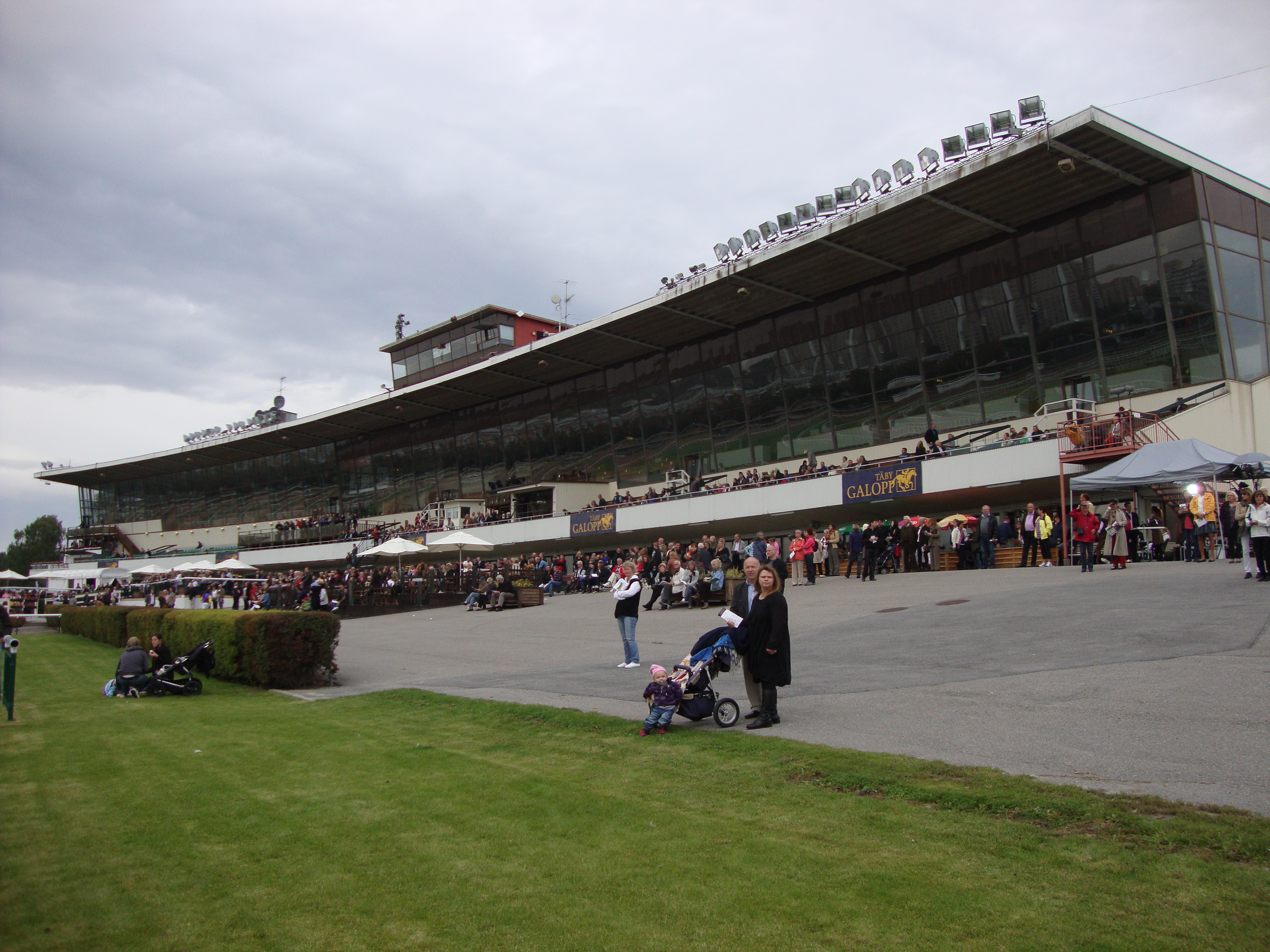
The main building.

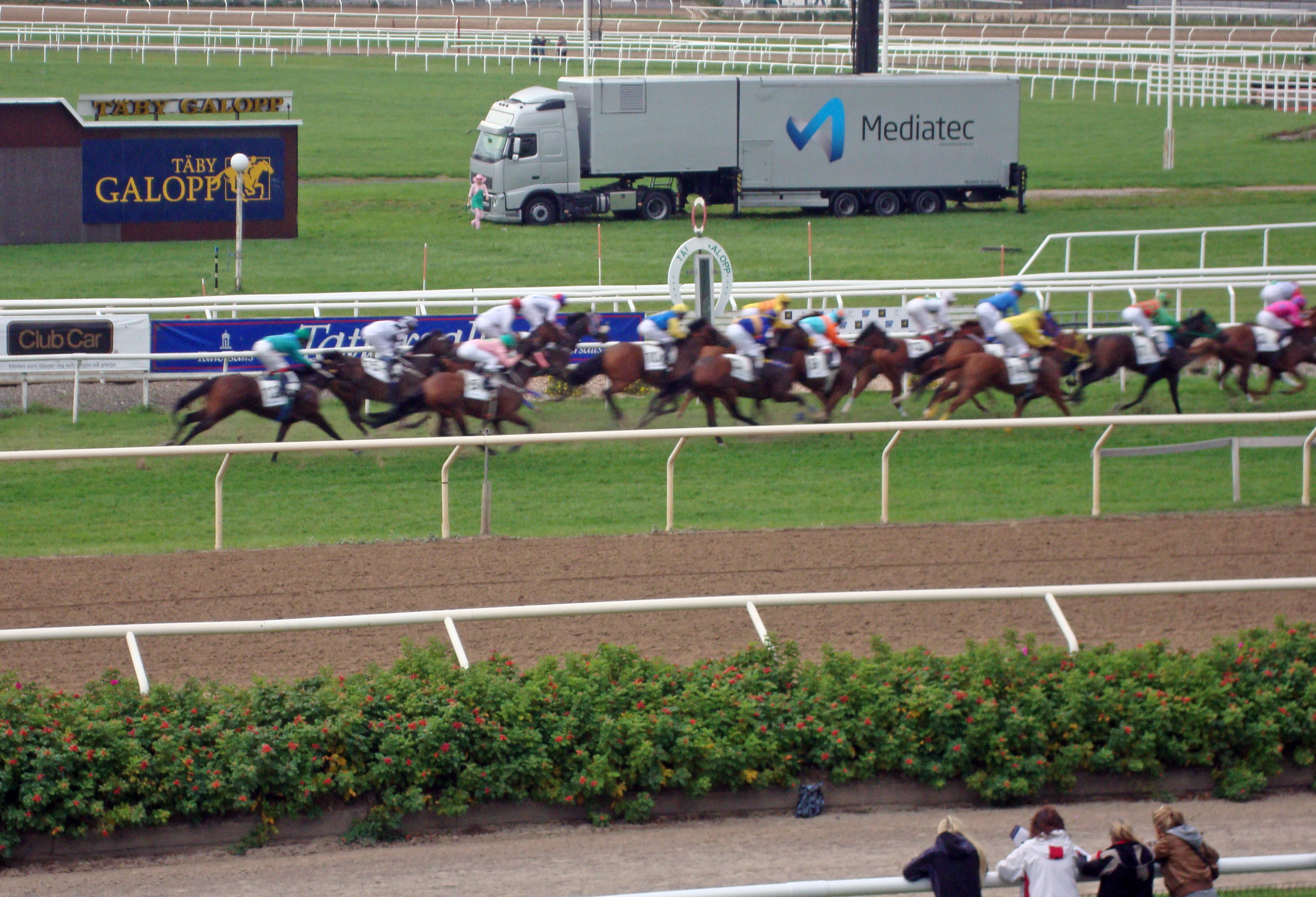
A race at the finish.

Täby Racecourse, (Swedish: Täby Galopp), was a Thoroughbred horse racing venue located in Täby, approximately 15 kilometers north of Stockholm. Täby Racecourse was before its closure in 2016, the premier track in Scandinavia.

== History ==
The venue opened August 28, 1960, and the Swedish King Gustaf VI Adolf was present, as well as an audience of 11,000 people. It was based on the major racecourses in the United States and its facilities were constantly up-graded and were as good as most courses in Europe, and unrivalled in Scandinavia.

== The racetrack ==
Racing took place throughout the year, the variety available varying from dirt racing under lights during the winter and spring to the top flat and jump races in Scandinavia run during the summer and fall.

The course usually staged about 50 days racing a year with the dirt track being used exclusively until May. Racing under floodlights was first staged in 1965 and the formula is now working with considerable success in England at Wolverhampton Racecourse and other courses in Europe.

The left-handed track was also designed on a similar basis as courses in North America with a dirt track which was about 8 furlongs (1.6 km; 1.0 mi) in length on the outside of the turf course. There was also the added attraction of a figure-eight hurdle and steeplechase track on the inside plus stabling nearby.

== Developments during the years ==
During the years Täby Galopp made a significant impression on the international scene, being the first course outside the five main European countries to stage a Pattern race following the granting of Group 3 status to the Stockholm Cup International in 1994.

In recognition of the quality of racing at the track, a second race, the Täby Open Sprint Championship, was awarded Group 3 status in 1998.

The 12 furlong race regularly attracted good quality horses from the rest of Europe keen to take on the best Scandinavian middle-distance horses. In 1997 Harbour Dues took the prize for Lady Herries before heading down to Australia to run a gallant fourth in the Melbourne Cup. In 2003 Labirinto won the race for France. In 2004, Collier Hill took the prize back to England and came back again to win it in 2006.

== Closure and move to Upplands-Bro ==
In 2011, an agreement was signed to sell the land to JM Bygg and Skanska, that intends to build 4,000 apartments on the land. The gallop was in 2016 moved to a new facility in Upplands-Bro Municipality, approximately 40 kilometres northeast of Stockholm City. The new racing venue goes under the name Bro Park. May 18th, 2016, was the very last day of competition at the Täby Racecourse, and it was called the Tribute Day.
