= Vallée Enchantée =

Irish-bred Thoroughbred racehorse

- Sire: Peintre Celebre
- Grandsire: Nureyev
- Dam: Verveine
- Damsire: Lear Fan
- Sex: Mare
- Foaled: 27 March 2000
- Country: Ireland
- Colour: Bay
- Breeder: Dayton Investments Ltd
- Owner: Ecurie Wildenstein
- Trainer: Élie Lellouche
- Record: 11: 5-0-3
- Earnings: €1,295,625

Major wins
- Hong Kong Vase (2003)

Vallée Enchantée (foaled 27 March 2000) is a retired thoroughbred racehorse bred in Ireland and trained in France. She won Hong Kong Vase and two group races in 2003. A very small horse, she weighed 813 pounds when she won the Hong Kong Vase.
