= Collier Hill =

British-bred Thoroughbred racehorse

- Sire: Dr Devious
- Grandsire: Ahonoora
- Dam: Polar Queen
- Damsire: Polish Precedent
- Sex: Gelding
- Foaled: 1998
- Country: Great Britain
- Colour: Chestnut
- Breeder: George W. Strawbridge, Jr.
- Owner: J. David Abell, Richard Crowe & Russell H. Hall
- Trainer: Alan Swinbank
- Record: 45: 15-10-6
- Earnings: £2,317,161

Major wins
- Stockholm Cup International (2004, 2006); Gerling-Preis (2005); Irish St. Leger (2005); Canadian International Stakes (2006); Hong Kong Vase (2006)

Collier Hill (foaled 26 March 1998) is a British Thoroughbred racehorse. He was bred by the prominent American sportsman George W. Strawbridge, Jr. who was involved in both steeplechase and flat racing and who raced in Europe and the United States.

== Background ==
Out of the mare Polar Queen, a granddaughter of Danzig, Collier Hill was sired by the 1992 Epsom Derby winner, Dr Devious. He was an unbroken three-year-old when Melsonby trainer Alan Swinbank purchased him at the 2001 Ascot Bloodstock Sales for £5,500. Swinbank sold a half-interest in the horse to Russell Hall and then the remaining half to Ashley Young. Renamed from Dr Freeze to Collier Hill after a hill on a farm owned by Hall, the horse suffered from a number of physical ailments and his race conditioning was a slow process.

== Racing career ==
Collier Hill began his racing career in bumper races in North Yorkshire, where trainer Alan Swinbank operated his stables. He earned his first win as a four-year-old in March 2002 in a two-mile race at Catterick Bridge Racecourse in Catterick Bridge. After moderate success in hurdling races, Collier Hill began to show promise in flat racing, focusing on events where he could use his demonstrated ability at middle to long distances. In 2004, he won a Listed race at Hamilton Park Racecourse in Scotland, then earned his first significant victory when his handlers entered him in the Group 3 Stockholm Cup International at Taby Racecourse in Sweden. He was ridden by 45-year-old journeyman jockey Dean McKeown, who rode him for the rest of his career. Having handled travelling well, Collier Hill was sent to compete at Nad Al Sheba Racecourse in Dubai in early 2005, where he won a turf handicap and ran third in the Group 1 Dubai Sheema Classic. While the horse was racing in Dubai, a veterinarian diagnosed him as suffering from arthritis that required medication being given through injections in his joints on a near bi-monthly basis.

With an affinity for travelling and running on new venues, Collier Hill was shipped to Germany, where he won the 2005 Group 2 Gerling-Preis in Cologne and finished second in the Group 1 Deutschland-Preis at Düsseldorf. In July, he finished second by a head in the Curragh Cup at Ireland's famed Curragh Racecourse and came back in September to win the Group 1 Irish St. Leger, defeating Vinnie Roe, who had won the race the previous four years.

A disagreement between co-owner Ashley Young and trainer Alan Swinbank led to Collier Hill being put up for sale at a Tattersalls auction in October. Co-owner Russell Hall was the successful bidder who then immediately sold Young's former half-share to David Abell and Richard Crowe.

In 2006, Collier Hill raced with great success at venues around the world. He finished second in a repeat appearance in the Dubai Sheema Classic, returned to Sweden to win another Stockholm Cup International, and became the first 8-year-old to win the C$2 million Grade 1 Canadian International Stakes at Woodbine Racetrack in Canada and the HK$14 million Hong Kong Vase in Hong Kong, China.

In the spring of 2007, Collier Hill was scheduled to make his first start of the year in the Dubai Sheema Classic. However, his age and continued arthritic affliction led to his withdrawal. After a career that saw him race in eight countries and earn more than £2.3 million in prize money, the gelding was retired.

When Collier Hill made his appearance in the Canadian International Stakes in Toronto, the Woodbine Entertainment Group pre-race publicity described him this way: "For fans of class, versatility and the ageless veteran, Collier Hill, is your equine superhero."
