= Bro Park Racecourse =

Thoroughbred horse racing venue

Bro Park
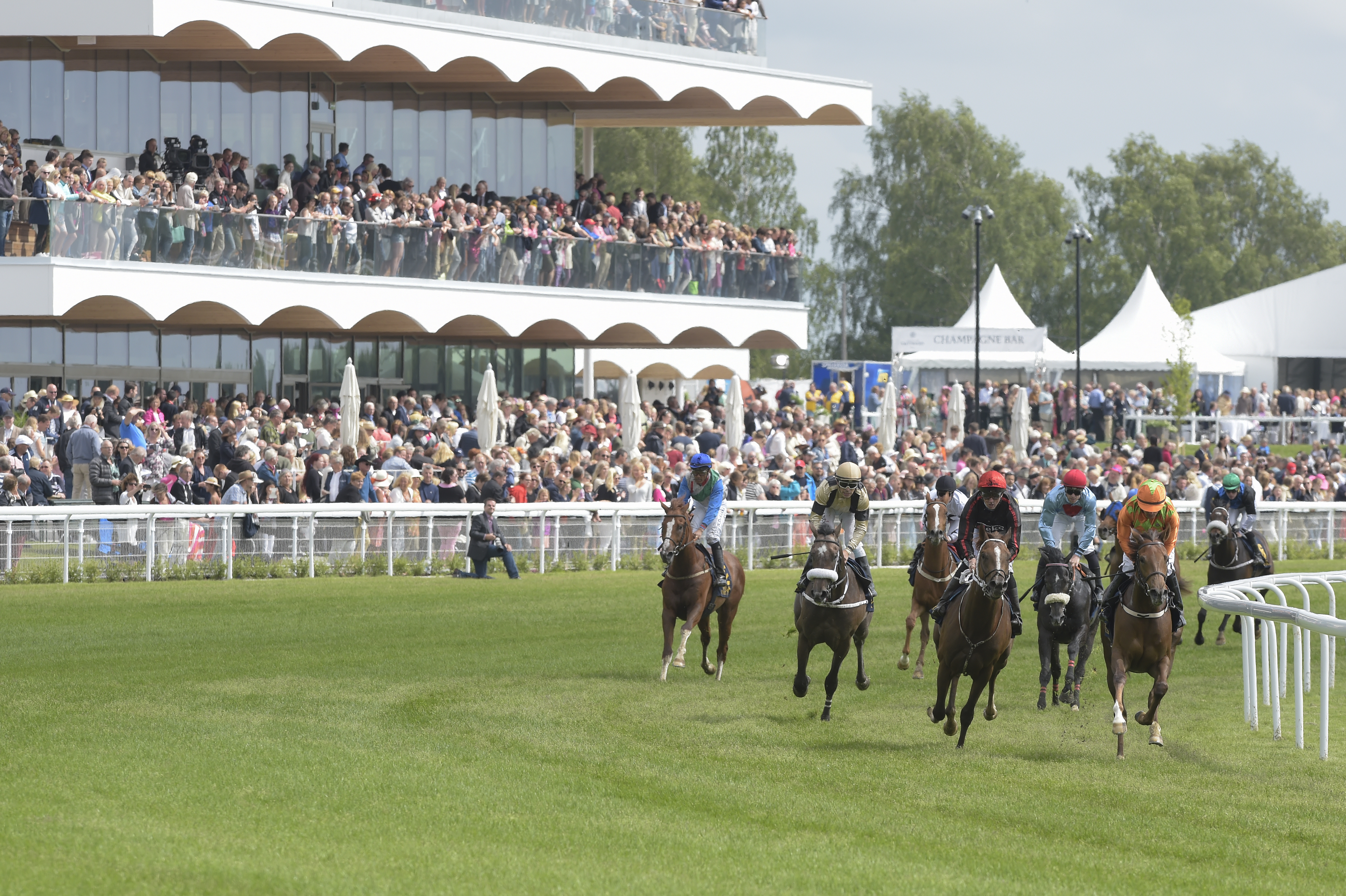
- A race going past the stands in 2016
- Interactive map of Bro Park
- Location: Upplands-Bro Municipality, Sweden
- Coordinates: 59°31′16″N 17°36′43″E
- Events: Thoroughbred horse racing, flat racing
- Surface: Dirt track (1900 m); Grass track (2100 m)

Construction
- Opened: June 19, 2016

Tenants
- Stockholms Stora Pris; Stockholm Cup International; Zawawi Bro Park Vårsprint

Website
- Official website

Bro Park is a Thoroughbred horse racing venue located in Upplands-Bro Municipality, approximately 40 kilometres northwest of Stockholm city. It was inaugurated June 19, 2016, with around 10,000 visitors in the audience.

== Background ==
In 2011, an agreement was signed to sell the land where Täby Racecourse was located to JM Bygg and Skanska, that intended to build 4,000 apartments on the land. The racing meets held at Täby were therefore in 2016 moved to the new facility at Bro Park.
