= Oslo Cup (horserace) =

Flat horse race in Norway

- Class: Listed
- Location: Øvrevoll Racecourse; Øvrevoll, Norway
- Inaugurated: 2005
- Race type: Flat / Thoroughbred
- Website: Øvrevoll

Race information
- Distance: 2,400 metres (1½ miles)
- Surface: Turf
- Track: Left-handed
- Qualification: Three-years-old and up
- Weight: 53 kg (3yo); 59 kg (4yo+); Allowances; 1½ kg for fillies and mares Penalties; 3 kg for Group 1 winners * 2 kg for Group 2 winners * 1 kg for Group 3 winners * * since January 1 last year
- Purse: 600,000 kr (2018); 1st: 300,000 kr

The Oslo Cup is a Listed flat horse race in Norway open to thoroughbreds aged three years or older. It is run over a distance of 2,400 metres (about 1½ miles) at Øvrevoll in late July or early August. It was changed from the Walter Nilsens Minneløp in 2013.

== History ==
The event was named Walter Nilsens Minneløp 2005-2012 in memory of Walter Nilsen, a successful owner-breeder in Norway. It was established in 2005, and was initially held on May 17, the Norwegian public holiday of Constitution Day. It replaced the Oslo Cup, originally staged later in the season.

The Walter Nilsens Minneløp was originally restricted to horses aged four or older. The first running was won by the previous year's Oslo Cup winner, Alpino Chileno.

The race was given Listed status in 2007. It was promoted to Group 3 level in 2011. It was moved to July and opened to three-year-olds in 2012. The race was downgraded to Listed status in 2022.

== Records ==
Most successful horse (2 wins):

- Appel au Maitre – 2008, 2009
- Ami De Vega - 2024, 2025

Leading jockey (4 wins):

- Fredrik Johansson – Appel au Maitre (2008, 2009), Bank of Burden (2011), Sir Lando (2012)
- Sandro De Paiva - Wishformore (2021), Captain Chorus (2023), Ami De Vega (2024, 2025)

Leading trainer (7 wins):

- Niels Petersen - Bank of Burden (2011), Without Fear (2014), Eye In The Sky (2015), Our Last Summer (2018), Square de Luynes (2019), Privilegiado (2020), Wishformore (2021)

== Winners ==
Year	Winner	Age	Jockey	Trainer	Time
2005	Alpino Chileno	6	Carlos Lopez	Rune Haugen	2:33.60
2006	Mick Jerome	5	Yvonne Durant	Rune Haugen	2:32.00
2007	Miss the Boat	5	Pascolina Pinto	Arnfinn Lund	2:34.90
2008	Appel au Maitre	4	Fredrik Johansson	Wido Neuroth	2:33.90
2009	Appel au Maitre	5	Fredrik Johansson	Wido Neuroth	2:29.10
2010	Alpacco	8	Manuel Martinez	Sandie Kjær Nortoft	2:35.70
2011	Bank of Burden	4	Fredrik Johansson	Niels Petersen	2:34.60
2012	Sir Lando	5	Fredrik Johansson	Wido Neuroth	2:37.40
2013	Touz Price	5	Jacob Johansen	Rune Haugen	2:32.40
2014	Without Fear	6	Rafael Schistl	Niels Petersen	2:32.70
2015	Eye In The Sky	4	Elione Chaves	Niels Petersen	2:34.70
2016	Hurricane Red	6	Jacob Johansen	Lennart Reuterskold Jr.	2:35.50
2017	Giuseppe Piazzi^{[a]}	5	Oliver Wilson	Flemming Velin	2:33.00
2018	Our Last Summer	5	Rafael Schistl	Niels Petersen	2:31.70
2019	Square de Luynes	4	Rafael Schistl	Niels Petersen	2:30.10
2020	Privilegiado	4	Oliver Wilson	Niels Petersen	2:31.00
2021	Wishformore	5	Sandro De Paiva	Niels Petersen	2:35.20
2022	Quebello	5	Anna Pilroth	Tobias Hellgreen	2:31.60
2023	Captain Chorus	5	Sandro De Paiva	Cathrine Erichsen	2:36.70
2024	Ami De Vega	4	Sandro De Paiva	Jan-Erik Neuroth	2:38.20
2025	Ami De Vega	5	Sandro De Paiva	Jan-Erik Neuroth	2:30.70
2026	Schamyl	5	Nikolaj Stott	Jan-Erik Neuroth	2:35.00

^{a} Eye In The Sky finished first in 2017 but was placed third for causing interference.

== Oslo Cup ==
The Oslo Cup was the precursor of the Walter Nilsens Minneløp. It was last run in 2004.

- 1953: Stratos
- 1956: Norse
- 1957: Cobetto
- 1958: Orsini
- 1963: Briansk
- 1972: Gunsmoke
- 1975: Noble Dancer
- 1976: Noble Dancer
- 1977: Brave Tudor
- 1978: Hill's Double
- 1979: Coulstry
- 1982: Rheinsteel
- 1983: Shaftesbury
- 1984: Rheinsteel
- 1985: Tryffoc
- 1986: Sand Ship
- 1987: Gulfland
- 1988: Sunset Boulevard
- 1990: Feuerbach
- 1991: Silvestro
- 1992: Red Hero
- 1993: Kateb
- 1994: Kateb
- 1995: Theatrician
- 1996: Ballet Prince / Laila Alawi *
- 1997: Inchrory
- 1998: Inchrory
- 1999: Inchrory
- 2000: Royal Crusade
- 2001: Valley Chapel
- 2002: Parthe
- 2003: Sagittarius
- 2004: Alpino Chileno

* The 1996 race was a dead-heat and has joint winners.

== See also ==
- List of Scandinavian flat horse races
