= Øvrevoll Galoppbane =

Gallop racecourse in Øvrevoll, Bærum, Norway

Coordinates: 59.9395°N 10.6227°E

- Interactive map of Øvrevoll Galoppbane
- Location: Øvrevoll, Bærum, Norway
- Date opened: 26 June 1932
- Course type: Flat racing
- Notable races: Marit Sveaas Minneløp; Polar Cup; Walter Nilsens Minneløp

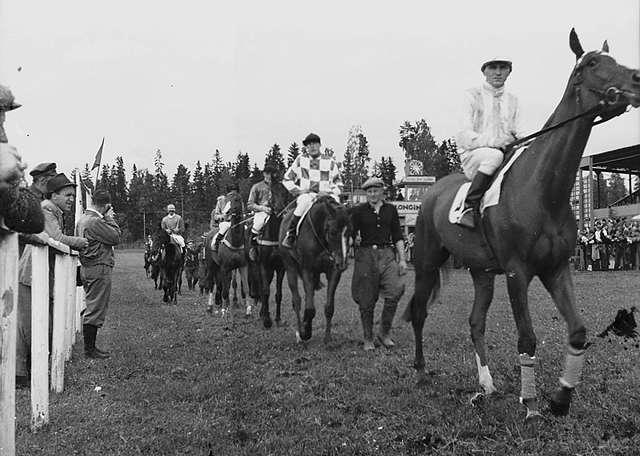
Øvrevoll Galoppbane in 1939.

Øvrevoll Galoppbane is the only gallop racecourse in Norway. It is located at Øvrevoll between Østerås (west), Jar (south) and Eiksmarka (north) in Bærum. It has both a turf track and an all-weather track. It was officially opened in 1932 by King Haakon VII and Queen Maud.

The biggest event of the year is the Derby Day, one Sunday at the end of August every year. Øvrevoll Galoppbane has a grandstand with a restaurant, as well as the Stallkroen Restaurant on the north side of the track. Sherryhaugen Café has a good view of the paddock.

In the late 1980s, there were plans to build a hotel and a shopping mall near the circuit, to generate more traffic at the racecourse. This was rejected by local authorities. There were talks about moving the entire racecourse to rural Lier in protest, but this did not happen, partly because Norsk Rikstoto did not have finances to back it up. In 1990, the owners announced plans to stay at Øvrevoll, but expand by building a golf course.

== Notable races ==
- Marit Sveaas Minneløp
- Polar Cup
- Walter Nilsens Minneløp

== See also ==
- List of Scandinavian flat horse races
