= Alan Swinbank =

British racehorse trainer

Alan Swinbank (c.1945 – 17 May 2017) was a British racehorse trainer whose horses competed in both Flat racing and National Hunt racing. Swinbank was based at racing stables in Melsonby, North Yorkshire. He trained the winners of more than 800 races in a career lasting from 1982 until his death, and gained his most notable success with Collier Hill. He died suddenly on 17 May 2017, aged 72.

== Major wins ==
Canada

- Canadian International Stakes - Collier Hill (2006)

Hong Kong

- Hong Kong Vase - Collier Hill (2006)

Ireland

- Irish St. Leger - Collier Hill (2005)
