= Kim Andersen (jockey) =

Danish jockey

Kim Andersen (born 1963) is a jockey in Scandinavian horse racing.

Andersen grew up at the racecourse in Klampenborg where his father, John Andersen, was a jockey in the 1960s. He was keen to follow in his father's footsteps after finishing his education. His apprenticeship was postponed for 3 years because his father retired due to ill health after being in the business over in 20 years. His parents thought it was best if he first got an education.

After finishing school Kim Andersen trained as a confectioner before he first became an apprentice to the champion trainer Franz Nutz. At the time Nutz already had a number of apprentice jockeys in his care who helped teach Andersen the business.

The first year as an apprentice there were no victories, but he persevered and won his first race a year later. He went on to become the leading jockey at his home racecourse at Klampenborg for 11 years.

Andersen has ridden with success at a number of racing venues throughout Europe and made two visits to Western Australia where he also met with success.
