= Arnfinn Lund =

Norwegian horse trainer (1935–2017)

Arnfinn Helge Lund (15 September 1935 – 23 March 2017) was a Norwegian horse trainer.

Hailing from Trondheim, he trained harness racing horses at Leangen Travbane before moving to Øvrevoll Galoppbane in 1957. Active here until 2012, his horses recorded 1,686 victories, including seven derby victories. He resided at Røa.

Lund died on 23 March 2017 at the age of 81.
