= Upplands-Bro Municipality =

Upplands-Bro Municipality Upplands-Bro kommun
- Municipality
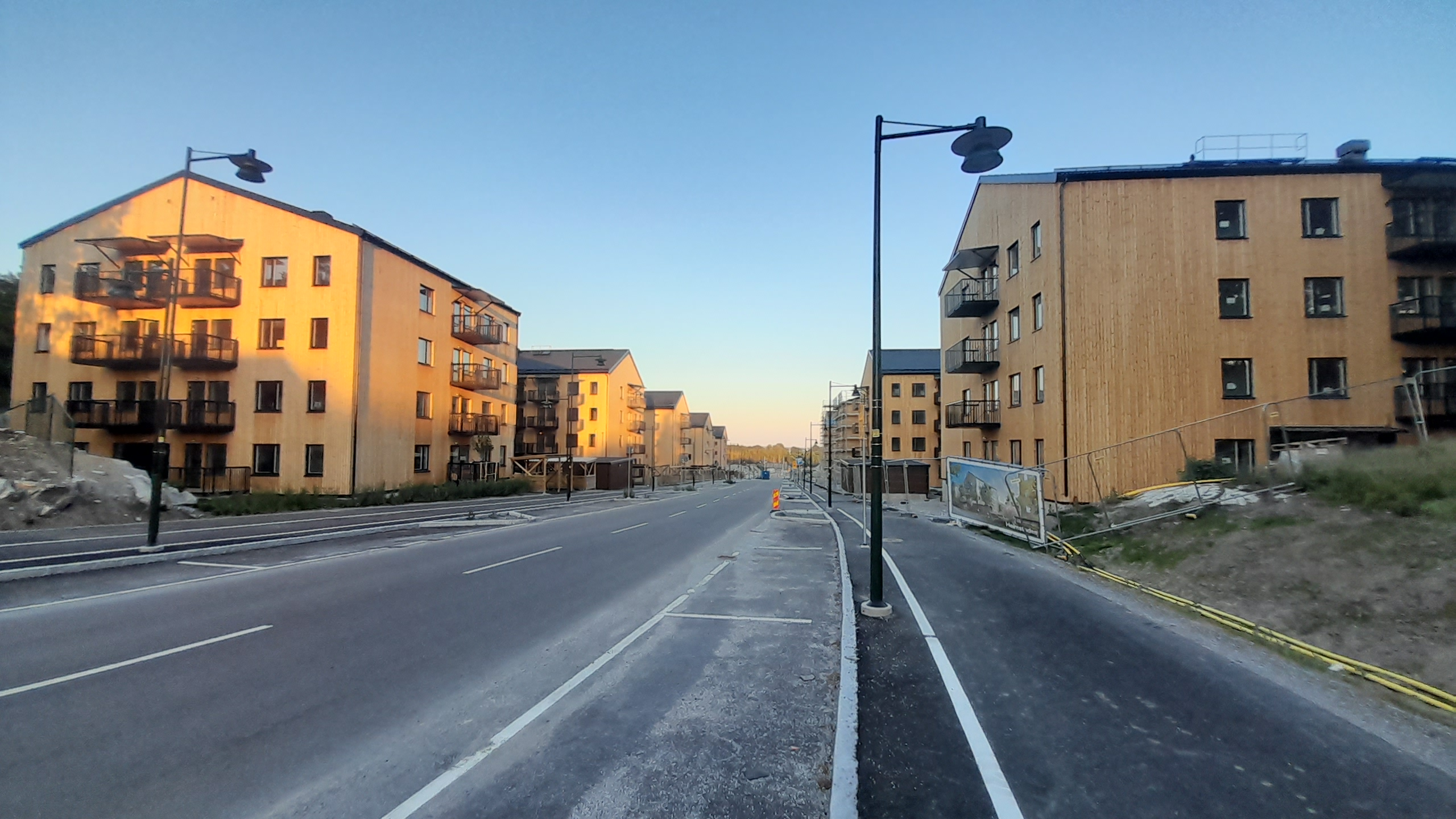
- Brogardstaden - A new community of Upplands-Bro Municipality

- Flag Coat of arms

- Coordinates: 59°29′N 17°45′E
- Country: Sweden
- County: Stockholm County
- Established: 1952
- Seat: Kungsängen

Area
  - Total: 325.23 km^{2} (125.57 sq mi)
  - Land: 235.47 km^{2} (90.92 sq mi)
  - Water: 89.76 km^{2} (34.66 sq mi)
- Area as of 1 January 2014.

Population (30 June 2025)
  - Total: 33,039
  - Density: 140.31/km^{2} (363.40/sq mi)
- Time zone: UTC+1 (CET)
  - Summer (DST): UTC+2 (CEST)
- ISO 3166 code: SE
- Province: Uppland
- Municipal code: 0139
- Website: www.upplands-bro.se
- Density is calculated using land area only.

Upplands-Bro Municipality (Swedish: Upplands-Bro kommun) is a municipality in Stockholm County in east central Sweden. Its seat is located in the town of Kungsängen.

The municipality was formed in 1952 through the amalgamation of five rural municipalities in Uppsala County. In 1971 it was transferred to Stockholm County.

== Geography ==
Situated by Lake Mälaren it is distinguished by its nature. The overwhelming majority of the population are located to one of the three towns Kungsängen (pop. 7,500), Bro (6,200) and Brunna (4,000), and most of the remaining area is taken up by countryside, a substantial part of it being agricultural.

== History ==
As apparent from its coat of arms, Upplands-Bro takes pride in its pre-historic history, and boasts some of the oldest ancient remains in Sweden. From the Iron Age, about 4,000 burial places have been found, and the remains from the Viking Age include 20 runestones. The figure in the coat of arms comes from one of these remains, a 3 cm tall bronze figure found near Kungsängen.

Every one of the six parishes also hosts a medieval church, built between 1100 and 1400.

In the 15th century, the fortress Almarestäket was built in the municipality, just east to the present location of Kungsängen. It was the seat of the Swedish archbishop until the Archbishop Gustav Trolle besieged himself there in 1517, leading to the demolition of the fortress in 1519. The ruins can still be visited.

Since 1970, the main base of the combined cavalry/infantry regiment Life Guards is located in Upplands-Bro. The regiment trains conscript companies of mechanized infantry, Royal Guards and military police. It is also the home of the Swedish Armed Forces International Centre (Swedint).

== Demographics ==
=== 2022 by district ===
This is a demographic table based on Upplands-Bro Municipality's electoral districts in the 2022 Swedish general election sourced from SVT's election platform, in turn taken from SCB official statistics.

In total there were 31,031 residents, including 20,468 Swedish citizens of voting age. 43.9% voted for the left coalition and 54.1% for the right coalition. Indicators are in percentage points except population totals and income.

Location	Residents	Citizen adults	Left vote	Right vote	Employed	Swedish parents	Foreign heritage	Income SEK	Degree
Location			%	%					
Bro S	1,217	735	46.0	51.0	84	44	56	30,307	40
Brunna N	2,006	1,379	38.4	60.3	85	71	29	31,335	40
Brunna S	2,080	1,388	38.6	60.0	82	64	36	28,970	36
Finnsta	2,476	1,334	58.5	37.5	71	31	69	21,205	30
Håtuna-Håbo-Tibble	1,722	1,380	29.6	68.5	83	83	17	29,309	31
Härnevi-Skällsta	1,839	1,094	48.3	48.2	74	45	55	24,328	39
Kockbacka	2,699	1,786	38.1	60.6	85	61	39	32,546	45
Korsängen	1,642	1,075	47.7	51.7	78	62	38	24,782	43
Kungsängen N	2,270	1,586	46.3	51.3	77	60	40	26,556	42
Kungsängen S	1,273	1,086	47.3	50.8	77	66	34	25,807	46
Lennartsnäs-Tibble	2,227	1,476	45.3	53.0	79	57	43	25,446	37
Låssa	1,204	848	39.9	59.6	82	72	28	29,697	42
Norrboda	1,913	1,171	37.7	61.7	88	59	41	30,647	47
Råby	2,734	1,540	54.3	42.8	67	34	66	19,194	31
Sylta-Tibble V	2,301	1,634	44.3	54.8	89	77	23	32,539	47
Tibble N	1,428	956	48.3	49.1	82	55	45	25,031	42
Source: SVT

=== Population development ===
Population development in Upplands-Bro Municipality 1970–2021
Year	Population
1970	10,936
1975	14,792
1980	18,489
1985	19,887
1990	20,191
1995	20,025
2000	20,878
2005	21,327
2010	23,676
2015	25,789
2017	27,614
2019	29,346
2021	31,082
Source: SCB - Folkmängd efter region och år.

=== Residents with a foreign background ===
On 31 December 2017 the number of people with a foreign background (persons born outside of Sweden or with two parents born outside of Sweden) was 9 646, or 34.93% of the population (27 614 on 31 December 2017). On 31 December 2002 the number of residents with a foreign background was (per the same definition) 5 002, or 23.64% of the population (21 162 on 31 December 2002). On 31 December 2017 there were 27 614 residents in Upplands-Bro, of which 7 088 people (25.67%) were born in a country other than Sweden. Divided by country in the table below - the Nordic countries as well as the 12 most common countries of birth outside of Sweden for Swedish residents have been included, with other countries of birth bundled together by continent by Statistics Sweden.

Country of birth
31 December 2017
1	Sweden	20,526
2	Finland	987
3	European Union: Other countries	776
4	Asia: Other countries	721
5	Iraq	632
6	Africa: Other countries	611
7	Poland	453
8	South America	435
9	Iran	404
10	Syria	281
11	Europe outside of the EU: other countries	263
12	Somalia	213
13	Eritrea	200
14	North America	165
15	Germany	142
16	Thailand	140
17	Norway	132
18	Afghanistan	118
18	Bosnia and Herzegovina	118
18	Turkey	118
21	Yugoslavia/Yugoslavia; SFR Yugoslavia/Serbia and Montenegro	56
22	Denmark	49
23	Iceland	27
24	Soviet Union	25
25	Oceania	14
26	Unknown country of birth	8

== Public transportation ==
The municipality is served by the Stockholm public transport system operated by SL. The municipal seat Kungsängen used to be the north-western terminus of the Stockholm commuter rail network, but in 2000 this line was extended to Bålsta in Uppsala County and a new station was built in Bro. A new depot for commuter trains has recently been built in the municipality. There is also a bus network.
