= 2010 World Thoroughbred Rankings =

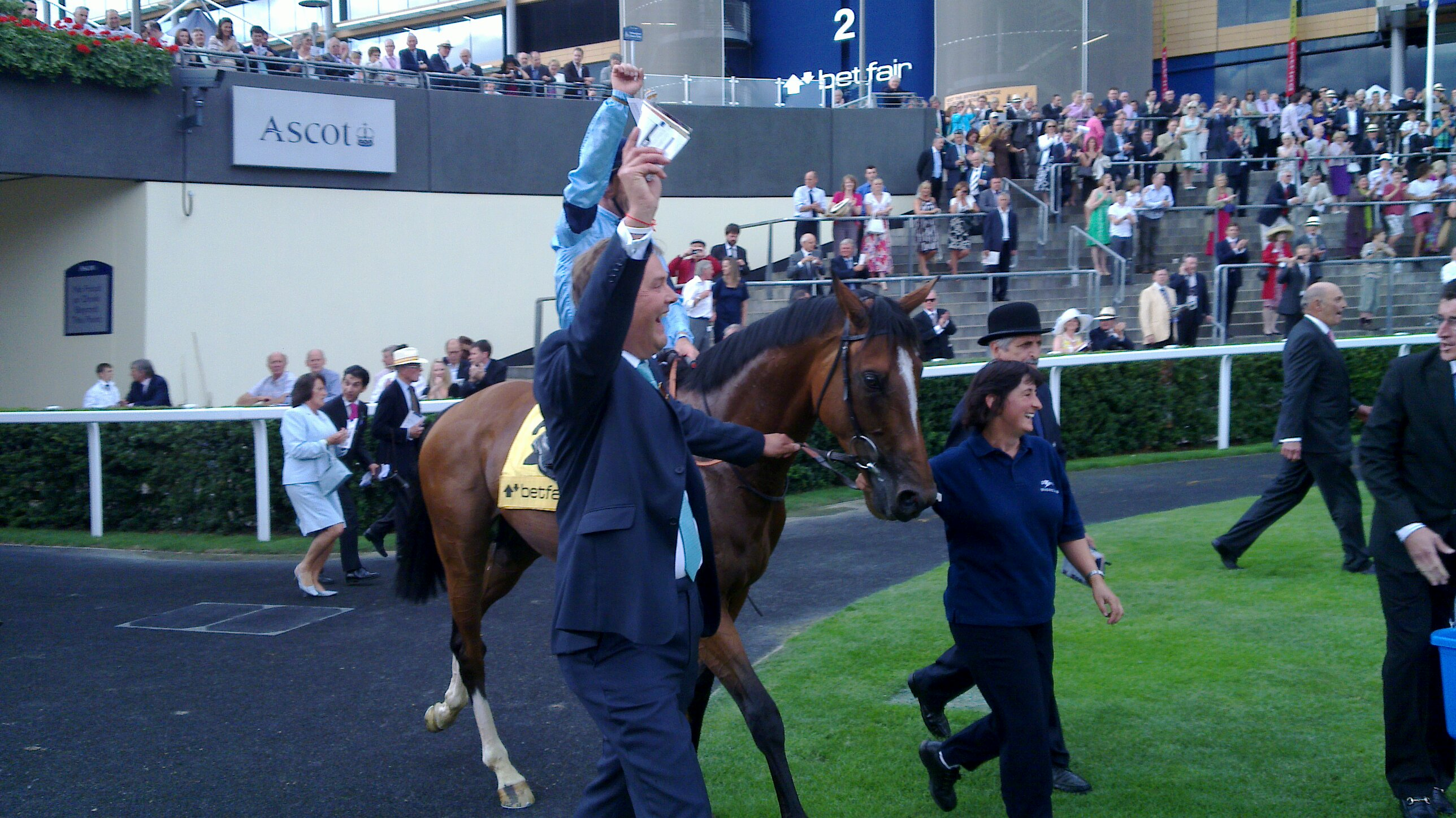
queen Elizabeth and King George VI 2010

The 2010 World Thoroughbred Rankings was the 2010 edition of the World Thoroughbred Rankings. It was an assessment of Thoroughbred racehorses issued by the International Federation of Horseracing Authorities (IFHA) in January 2011. It included horses aged three or older which competed in flat races during 2010. It was open to all horses irrespective of where they raced or were trained.

This year's highest rating was awarded to Harbinger for his performance in the King George VI and Queen Elizabeth Stakes. He was given a rating of 135. A total of 329 horses were included in the list, four fewer than the previous year.

== Full rankings for 2010 ==
- For a detailed guide to this table, see below.

Rank	Rating	Horse	Age	Sex	Trained	Pos.	Race	Surface	Dist.	Cat.
1	135	Harbinger (GB)	4	C	GB	1st	King George VI and Queen Elizabeth S.	Turf	2,414	L
2	129	Blame (USA)	4	C	USA	1st	Breeders' Cup Classic	Dirt	2,012	I
3	128	Makfi (GB)	3	C	FR	1st	Prix Jacques Le Marois	Turf	1,600	M
3	128	Quality Road (USA)	4	C	USA	1st 2nd	Donn Handicap; Whitney Handicap	Dirt; Dirt	1,811; 1,811	M M
3	128	Workforce (GB)	3	C	GB	1st 1st	Epsom Derby; Prix de l'Arc de Triomphe	Turf; Turf	2,423; 2,400	L L
6	127	Canford Cliffs (IRE)	3	C	GB	1st	Sussex Stakes	Turf	1,609	M
6	127	Nakayama Festa (JPN)	4	C	JPN	2nd	Prix de l'Arc de Triomphe	Turf	2,400	L
8	126	Cape Blanco (IRE)	3	C	IRE	1st	Irish Champion Stakes	Turf	2,012	I
8	126	Rip Van Winkle (IRE)	4	C	IRE	1st	International Stakes	Turf	2,092	I
8	126	So You Think (NZ)	4	C	AUS	1st 1st	Yalumba Stakes; Mackinnon Stakes	Turf; Turf	2,000; 2,000	I I
11	125	Goldikova (IRE)	5	M	FR	1st	Breeders' Cup Mile	Turf	1,609	M
	125	Rip Van Winkle (IRE)	4	C	IRE	2nd	Sussex Stakes	Turf	1,609	M
11	125	Twice Over (GB)	5	H	GB	2nd 1st	International Stakes; Champion Stakes	Turf; Turf	2,092; 2,012	I I
11	125	Zenyatta (USA)	6	M	USA	1st 2nd	Vanity Handicap; Breeders' Cup Classic	Artificial; Dirt	1,811; 2,012	M I
14	124	Byword (GB)	4	C	FR	2nd 3rd	Prix d'Ispahan; International Stakes	Turf; Turf	1,850; 2,092	M I
14	124	Dick Turpin (IRE)	3	C	GB	1st	Prix Jean Prat	Turf	1,600	M
14	124	Eskendereya (USA)	3	C	USA	1st	Wood Memorial Stakes	Dirt	1,811	M
14	124	Fame and Glory (GB)	4	C	IRE	1st	Coronation Cup	Turf	2,423	L
14	124	Lookin at Lucky (USA)	3	C	USA	1st	Haskell Invitational Stakes	Dirt	1,811	M
14	124	Lope de Vega (IRE)	3	C	FR	1st	Prix du Jockey Club	Turf	2,100	I
14	124	Paco Boy (IRE)	5	H	GB	2nd	Queen Anne Stakes	Turf	1,609	M
21	123	Black Caviar (AUS)	4	F	AUS	1st	Patinack Farm Classic	Turf	1,200	S
21	123	Fly Down (USA)	3	C	USA	3rd	Breeders' Cup Classic	Dirt	2,012	I
23	122	Behkabad (FR)	3	C	FR	1st 1st 4th	Grand Prix de Paris; Prix Niel; Prix de l'Arc de Triomphe	Turf; Turf; Turf	2,400; 2,400; 2,400	L L L
23	122	J J the Jet Plane (SAF)	6	G	SAF	1st	Hong Kong Sprint	Turf	1,200	S
23	122	Poet's Voice (GB)	3	C	GB	1st	Queen Elizabeth II Stakes	Turf	1,609	M
	122	So You Think (NZ)	4	C	AUS	3rd	Melbourne Cup	Turf	3,200	E
26	121	Afleet Express (USA)	3	C	USA	1st	Travers Stakes	Dirt	2,012	I
26	121	Americain (USA)	5	H	FR	1st	Melbourne Cup	Turf	3,200	E
26	121	Buena Vista (JPN)	4	F	JPN	1st 2nd↓	Tenno Sho (Autumn); Japan Cup	Turf; Turf	2,000; 2,400	I L
26	121	Dangerous Midge (USA)	4	C	GB	1st	Breeders' Cup Turf	Turf	2,414	L
26	121	Gio Ponti (USA)	5	H	USA	2nd	Breeders' Cup Mile	Turf	1,609	M
26	121	Haynesfield (USA)	4	C	USA	1st	Jockey Club Gold Cup	Dirt	2,012	I
26	121	Lily of the Valley (FR)	3	F	FR	1st	Prix de l'Opéra	Turf	2,000	I
26	121	Lizard's Desire (SAF)	4	G	UAE	1st	Singapore Airlines International Cup	Turf	2,000	I
26	121	Midday (GB)	4	F	GB	1st 1st	Nassau Stakes; Yorkshire Oaks	Turf; Turf	1,986; 2,414	I L
26	121	Planteur (IRE)	3	C	FR	2nd	Prix Niel	Turf	2,400	L
26	121	Rewilding (GB)	3	C	GB	1st	Great Voltigeur Stakes	Turf	2,414	L
26	121	Rocket Man (AUS)	5	G	SIN	2nd	Hong Kong Sprint	Turf	1,200	S
26	121	Sacred Kingdom (AUS)	6; 7	G	HK	1st 1st	Chairman's Sprint Prize; Sha Tin Sprint Trophy	Turf; Turf	1,200; 1,000	S S
26	121	Sarafina (FR)	3	F	FR	3rd	Prix de l'Arc de Triomphe	Turf	2,400	L
26	121	Starspangledbanner (AUS)	3	C	IRE	1st	Golden Jubilee Stakes	Turf	1,207	S
26	121	Victoire Pisa (JPN)	3	C	JPN	1st	Arima Kinen	Turf	2,500	L
26	121	Vision d'Etat (FR)	5	H	FR	2nd	Champion Stakes	Turf	2,012	I
43	120	Able One (NZ)	8	G	HK	2nd 1st	Sha Tin Trophy; Jockey Club Mile	Turf; Turf	1,600; 1,600	M M
43	120	Arctic Cosmos (USA)	3	C	GB	1st	St. Leger Stakes	Turf	2,937	E
43	120	Await the Dawn (USA)	3	C	IRE	1st	Kilternan Stakes	Turf	2,012	I
43	120	Collection (IRE)	5	G	HK	1st	Hong Kong Gold Cup	Turf	2,000	I
43	120	Debussy (IRE)	4	C	GB	1st 3rd	Arlington Million; Champion Stakes	Turf; Turf	2,012; 2,012	I I
43	120	Dream Journey (JPN)	6	H	JPN	3rd	Kyoto Kinen	Turf	2,200	L
43	120	Fuisse (FR)	4	C	FR	1st 1st	Prix Messidor; Prix du Moulin de Longchamp	Turf; Turf	1,600; 1,600	M M
43	120	Glória de Campeão (BRZ)	6	H	FR	1st 2nd	Dubai World Cup; Singapore Airlines International Cup	Artificial; Turf	2,000; 2,000	I I
43	120	Hay List (AUS)	5	G	AUS	1st 1st 1st	McEwen Stakes; Manikato Stakes; Gilgai Stakes	Turf; Turf; Turf	1,000; 1,200; 1,200	S S S
43	120	Mastery (GB)	4	C	UAE	1st	Hong Kong Vase	Turf	2,400	L
43	120	Paddy O'Prado (USA)	3	C	USA	5th	Breeders' Cup Classic	Dirt	2,012	I
43	120	Pelusa (JPN)	3	C	JPN	2nd	Tenno Sho (Autumn)	Turf	2,000	I
43	120	Presvis (GB)	6	G	GB	1st	Jebel Hatta	Turf	1,800	M
43	120	Rachel Alexandra (USA)	4	F	USA	1st	Fleur de Lis Handicap	Dirt	1,811	M
43	120	Red Jazz (USA)	3	C	GB	3rd	Queen Elizabeth II Stakes	Turf	1,609	M
43	120	Rio de la Plata (USA)	5	H	GB	1st	Premio Roma	Turf	2,000	I
43	120	Rose Kingdom (JPN)	3	C	JPN	1st↑	Japan Cup	Turf	2,400	L
43	120	Sans Frontieres (IRE)	4	C	GB	1st 1st	Princess of Wales's Stakes; Irish St. Leger	Turf; Turf	2,414; 2,816	L E
43	120	Scalo (GB)	3	C	GER	1st	Preis von Europa	Turf	2,400	L
43	120	Snow Fairy (IRE)	3	F	GB	1st	Queen Elizabeth II Commemorative Cup	Turf	2,200	L
43	120	Spanish Moon (USA)	6	H	GB	3rd	Dubai Sheema Classic	Turf	2,410	L
43	120	Super Saver (USA)	3	C	USA	1st	Kentucky Derby	Dirt	2,012	I
43	120	The Usual Q. T. (USA)	4	C	USA	3rd	Breeders' Cup Mile	Turf	1,609	M
43	120	Whobegotyou (AUS)	5	G	AUS	2nd 1st 3rd	Memsie Stakes; Dato Tan Chin Nam Stakes; W. S. Cox Plate	Turf; Turf; Turf	1,400; 1,600; 2,040	M M I
43	120	Zipping (AUS)	9	G	AUS	2nd	W. S. Cox Plate	Turf	2,040	I
68	119	Al Shemali (GB)	6	H	UAE	1st	Dubai Duty Free	Turf	1,800	M
68	119	Allybar (IRE)	4	C	UAE	3rd	Dubai World Cup	Artificial	2,000	I
68	119	Better Than Ever (AUS)	4	G	SIN	1st	Raffles Cup	Turf	1,800	M
68	119	Big Drama (USA)	4	C	USA	1st	Breeders' Cup Sprint	Dirt	1,207	S
68	119	Black Piranha (AUS)	6	G	AUS	1st	Stradbroke Handicap	Turf	1,400	M
68	119	Bold Silvano (SAF)	3	C	SAF	1st	Durban July Handicap	Turf	2,200	L
68	119	Cityscape (GB)	4	C	GB	1st	Joel Stakes	Turf	1,609	M
68	119	Court Vision (USA)	5	G	USA	1st	Woodbine Mile	Turf	1,609	M
68	119	Duncan (GB)	5	H	GB	2nd 1st	Hardwicke Stakes; Prix Foy	Turf; Turf	2,414; 2,400	L L
68	119	Egyptian Ra (NZ)	8	G	HK	1st	Chinese Club Challenge Cup	Turf	1,400	M
68	119	Equiano (FR)	5	H	GB	2nd	July Cup	Turf	1,207	S
68	119	Etched (USA)	5	H	USA	1st	Monmouth Cup	Dirt	1,811	M
68	119	Happy Zero (AUS)	5	G	HK	1st	Queen's Silver Jubilee Cup	Turf	1,400	M
68	119	Irian (GER)	4	G	HK	2nd	Hong Kong Cup	Turf	2,000	I
68	119	Irish Flame (SAF)	3	C	SAF	1st	South African Derby	Turf	2,450	L
68	119	Jakkalberry (IRE)	4	C	ITY	1st	Gran Premio di Milano	Turf	2,400	L
68	119	Jeranimo (USA)	4	C	USA	1st	San Gabriel Stakes	Turf	1,811	M
68	119	Kinsale King (USA)	5	H	USA	1st	Dubai Golden Shaheen	Artificial	1,200	S
68	119	Majesticperfection (USA)	4	C	USA	1st	Alfred G. Vanderbilt Handicap	Dirt	1,207	S
68	119	Premio Loco (USA)	6	G	GB	1st 1st 3rd	Criterion Stakes; Summer Mile Stakes; Sussex Stakes	Turf; Turf; Turf	1,408; 1,609; 1,609	M M M
68	119	Rail Trip (USA)	5	G	USA	2nd	Hollywood Gold Cup	Artificial	2,012	I
68	119	Rangirangdoo (NZ)	5	G	AUS	1st	Doncaster Mile	Turf	1,600	M
68	119	Regal Parade (GB)	6	G	GB	1st 4th	Prix Maurice de Gheest; Prix de la Forêt	Turf; Turf	1,300; 1,400	S M
68	119	Richard's Kid (USA)	5	H	USA	1st	Goodwood Stakes (USA)	Artificial	1,811	M
68	119	Shocking (AUS)	5	H	AUS	1st 4th	Makybe Diva Stakes; Caulfield Cup	Turf; Turf	1,600; 2,400	M L
68	119	Stacelita (FR)	4	F	FR	1st 2nd	La Coupe; Prix de l'Opéra	Turf; Turf	2,000; 2,000	I I
68	119	To the Glory (JPN)	3	C	JPN	3rd	Arima Kinen	Turf	2,500	L
95	118	Beauty Flash (NZ)	5	G	HK	1st	Hong Kong Mile	Turf	1,600	M
95	118	Bob Black Jack (USA)	5	H	USA	1st	San Carlos Handicap	Artificial	1,408	S
95	118	Champ Pegasus (USA)	4	C	USA	2nd	Breeders' Cup Turf	Turf	2,414	L
95	118	Cirrus des Aigles (FR)	4	C	FR	2nd	Prix du Conseil de Paris	Turf	2,400	L
95	118	Crown of Thorns (USA)	5	H	USA	2nd	Goodwood Stakes (USA)	Artificial	1,811	M
95	118	Dar Re Mi (GB)	5	M	GB	1st	Dubai Sheema Classic	Turf	2,410	L
95	118	Earnestly (JPN)	5	H	JPN	3rd 1st	Takarazuka Kinen; Sapporo Kinen	Turf; Turf	2,200; 2,000	L I
95	118	Eishin Flash (JPN)	3	C	JPN	1st	Tokyo Yushun	Turf	2,400	L
95	118	Espoir City (JPN)	5	H	JPN	1st 1st	February Stakes; Kashiwa Kinen	Dirt; Dirt	1,600; 1,600	M M
95	118	Fellowship (NZ)	7	G	HK	2nd	Queen's Silver Jubilee Cup	Turf	1,400	M
95	118	Gitano Hernando (GB)	4	C	GB	4th	Champion Stakes	Turf	2,012	I
95	118	Green Birdie (NZ)	6	G	HK	1st	KrisFlyer International Sprint	Turf	1,200	S
95	118	Heart of Dreams (AUS)	4; 5	G	AUS	2nd 2nd	C. F. Orr Stakes; Makybe Diva Stakes	Turf; Turf	1,400; 1,600	M M
95	118	Here Comes Ben (USA)	4	C	USA	1st	Forego Stakes	Dirt	1,408	S
95	118	Jaguar Mail (JPN)	6	H	JPN	2nd 1st 4th	Kyoto Kinen; Tenno Sho (Spring); Japan Cup	Turf; Turf; Turf	2,200; 3,200; 2,400	L E L
95	118	Joy and Fun (NZ)	6	G	HK	1st	Al Quoz Sprint	Turf	1,200	S
95	118	Lion Tamer (NZ)	3	C	NZ	1st	Victoria Derby	Turf	2,500	L
95	118	Markab (GB)	7	G	GB	1st	Haydock Sprint Cup	Turf	1,207	S
95	118	Presious Passion (USA)	7	G	USA	1st	Mac Diarmida Stakes	Turf	2,213	L
95	118	Rite of Passage (GB)	6	G	IRE	1st	Ascot Gold Cup	Turf	4,023	E
95	118	Sahpresa (USA)	5	M	FR	1st	Sun Chariot Stakes	Turf	1,609	M
95	118	Shoot Out (AUS)	4	G	AUS	1st 3rd 3rd 4th	J. J. Liston Stakes; Memsie Stakes; Turnbull Stakes; W. S. Cox Plate	Turf; Turf; Turf; Turf	1,400; 1,400; 2,000; 2,040	M M I I
95	118	Sirmione (AUS)	6	G	AUS	3rd	C. F. Orr Stakes	Turf	1,400	M
95	118	Siyouni (FR)	3	C	FR	3rd	Prix du Moulin de Longchamp	Turf	1,600	M
95	118	Successful Dan (USA)	4	G	USA	3rd↓	Clark Handicap	Dirt	1,811	M
95	118	Tazeez (USA)	6	G	GB	3rd	Prince of Wales's Stakes	Turf	2,012	I
95	118	Theseo (AUS)	6; 6; 7	G	AUS	1st 1st 1st	Chipping Norton Stakes; Ranvet Stakes; Chelmsford Stakes	Turf; Turf; Turf	1,600; 2,000; 1,600	M I M
95	118	Tuscan Evening (IRE)	5	M	USA	1st	Modesty Handicap	Turf	1,911	I
95	118	Typhoon Tracy (AUS)	4	F	AUS	1st 1st 1st	C. F. Orr Stakes; Futurity Stakes; Queen of the Turf Stakes	Turf; Turf; Turf	1,400; 1,600; 1,500	M M M
95	118	Unrivaled Belle (USA)	4	F	USA	1st	Breeders' Cup Ladies' Classic	Dirt	1,811	M
95	118	Viva Pataca (GB)	8	G	HK	1st	QE II Cup	Turf	2,000	I
126	117	Age of Aquarius (IRE)	4	C	IRE	2nd	Ascot Gold Cup	Turf	4,023	E
126	117	Alcopop (AUS)	6	G	AUS	2nd	Yalumba Stakes	Turf	2,000	I
126	117	Anacheeva (AUS)	3	C	AUS	1st	Caulfield Guineas	Turf	1,600	M
126	117	Battle Plan (USA)	5	H	USA	2nd	Stephen Foster Handicap	Dirt	1,811	M
126	117	Beethoven (IRE)	3	C	IRE	4th 1st 4th	Sussex Stakes; Desmond Stakes; Queen Elizabeth II Stakes	Turf; Turf; Turf	1,609; 1,609; 1,609	M M M
126	117	Blind Luck (USA)	3	F	USA	2nd	Cotillion Stakes	Dirt	1,710	M
126	117	Cavalryman (GB)	4	C	GB	4th	International Stakes	Turf	2,092	I
126	117	Corsica (IRE)	3	C	GB	3rd	St. Leger Stakes	Turf	2,937	E
126	117	Cutlass Bay (UAE)	4	C	FR	1st	Prix Ganay	Turf	2,100	I
126	117	Dakota Phone (USA)	5	G	USA	1st	Breeders' Cup Dirt Mile	Dirt	1,609	M
126	117	Danleigh (AUS)	6	G	AUS	1st	George Ryder Stakes	Turf	1,500	M
126	117	Descarado (NZ)	4	G	AUS	1st 2nd	Caulfield Cup; Mackinnon Stakes	Turf; Turf	2,400; 2,000	L I
126	117	Drosselmeyer (USA)	3	C	USA	1st	Belmont Stakes	Dirt	2,414	L
126	117	Dubai Majesty (USA)	5	M	USA	1st	Breeders' Cup Filly & Mare Sprint	Dirt	1,408	S
126	117	Famous Name (GB)	5	H	IRE	1st 1st	Meld Stakes; Trigo Stakes	Turf; Turf	1,811; 2,012	M I
126	117	Getaway (GER)	7	H	GER	2nd 2nd	Gerling-Preis; Gran Premio di Milano	Turf; Turf	2,400; 2,400	L L
126	117	Harmonious (USA)	3	F	USA	1st	Queen Elizabeth II Challenge Cup	Turf	1,811	M
126	117	Hearts of Fire (GB)	3	C	GB	3rd	St. James's Palace Stakes	Turf	1,609	M
126	117	Let Me Fight (IRE)	3	G	HK	4th	Hong Kong Sprint	Turf	1,200	S
126	117	Life at Ten (USA)	5	M	USA	1st	Beldame Stakes	Dirt	1,811	M
126	117	Lillie Langtry (IRE)	3	F	IRE	1st	Coronation Stakes	Turf	1,609	M
126	117	Manifest (GB)	4	C	GB	1st	Yorkshire Cup	Turf	2,816	E
126	117	Marinous (FR)	4	C	FR	6th	Prix de l'Arc de Triomphe	Turf	2,400	L
126	117	Meiner Kitz (JPN)	7	H	JPN	1st 2nd	Nikkei Sho; Tenno Sho (Spring)	Turf; Turf	2,500; 3,200	L E
126	117	Mic Mac (AUS)	4	G	AUS	3rd	T. J. Smith Stakes	Turf	1,200	S
126	117	Midas Touch (GB)	3	C	IRE	2nd 2nd 2nd	Irish Derby; Great Voltigeur Stakes; St. Leger Stakes	Turf; Turf; Turf	2,414; 2,414; 2,937	L L E
126	117	More Joyous (NZ)	4	F	AUS	1st 1st	Sebring Sprint; Toorak Handicap	Turf; Turf	1,400; 1,600	M M
126	117	Music Show (IRE)	3	F	GB	1st	Falmouth Stakes	Turf	1,609	M
126	117	Musir (AUS)	3	C	UAE	1st	UAE Derby	Artificial	1,900	I
126	117	Nicconi (AUS)	4	C	AUS	1st	Lightning Stakes	Turf	1,000	S
126	117	Night Magic (GER)	4	F	GER	1st	Grosser Preis von Baden	Turf	2,400	L
126	117	Packing Winner (NZ)	8	G	HK	3rd	Hong Kong Cup	Turf	2,000	I
126	117	Pocket Power (SAF)	7	G	SAF	1st 3rd	Queen's Plate (SAF); Champions Cup	Turf; Turf	1,600; 1,800	M M
126	117	Predatory Pricer (AUS)	5	H	AUS	2nd	J. J. Liston Stakes	Turf	1,400	M
126	117	Pressing (IRE)	7	H	GB	2nd 1st 1st	Sandown Mile; Premio Carlo Vittadini; Topkapi Trophy	Turf; Turf; Turf	1,622; 1,600; 1,600	M M M
126	117	Prince Bishop (IRE)	3	C	FR	1st	Prix du Conseil de Paris	Turf	2,400	L
126	117	Querari (GER)	4	C	GER	1st	Premio Presidente della Repubblica	Turf	2,000	I
126	117	Road to Rock (AUS)	5	H	AUS	2nd 1st	Doncaster Mile; Queen Elizabeth Stakes	Turf; Turf	1,600; 2,000	M I
126	117	Rosanara (FR)	3	F	FR	2nd	Prix de Diane	Turf	2,100	I
126	117	Sariska (GB)	4	F	GB	2nd	Coronation Cup	Turf	2,423	L
126	117	Shared Account (USA)	4	F	USA	1st	Breeders' Cup Filly & Mare Turf	Turf	2,213	L
126	117	Showa Modern (JPN)	6	H	JPN	1st	Yasuda Kinen	Turf	1,600	M
126	117	Sidney's Candy (USA)	3	C	USA	1st 1st 6th 1st	Santa Anita Derby; La Jolla Handicap; Breeders' Cup Mile; Sir Beaufort Stakes	Artificial; Turf; Turf; Dirt	1,811; 1,710; 1,609; 1,609	M M M M
126	117	Smart Falcon (JPN)	5	H	JPN	1st 1st	JBC Classic; Tokyo Daishoten	Dirt; Dirt	1,800; 2,000	M I
126	117	Smiling Tiger (USA)	3	C	USA	2nd	Malibu Stakes	Dirt	1,408	S
126	117	Sole Power (GB)	3	G	IRE	1st	Nunthorpe Stakes	Turf	1,006	S
126	117	Super Satin (NZ)	4	G	HK	3rd	QE II Cup	Turf	2,000	I
126	117	Tactic (GB)	4	C	GB	1st 1st	Grand Cup; Curragh Cup	Turf; Turf	2,816; 2,816	E E
126	117	Wanted (AUS)	3	C	AUS	1st	Newmarket Handicap	Turf	1,200	S
126	117	Wigmore Hall (IRE)	3	G	GB	5th	Champion Stakes	Turf	2,012	I
126	117	Winchester (USA)	5	H	USA	1st	Joe Hirsch Turf Classic Invitational	Turf	2,414	L
126	117	Youmzain (IRE)	7	H	GB	4th	Coronation Cup	Turf	2,423	L
178	116	A Little Warm (USA)	3	C	USA	3rd	Pennsylvania Derby	Dirt	1,811	M
178	116	Acclamation (USA)	4	C	USA	1st 1st	Jim Murray Handicap; Charles Whittingham Memorial H.	Turf; Turf	2,414; 2,012	L I
178	116	Antara (GER)	4	F	GB	3rd 2nd	Nassau Stakes; Prix Jean Romanet	Turf; Turf	1,986; 2,000	I I
178	116	Bankable (IRE)	6	H	UAE	2nd	Dubai Duty Free	Turf	1,800	M
178	116	Big City Life (SAF)	4	C	SAF	1st	Rising Sun Gold Challenge	Turf	1,600	M
178	116	Campanologist (USA)	5	H	GB	1st 1st	Deutschland-Preis; Rheinland-Pokal	Turf; Turf	2,400; 2,400	L L
178	116	Chamberlain Bridge (USA)	6	G	USA	1st	Breeders' Cup Turf Sprint	Turf	1,006	S
178	116	Dao Dao (AUS)	6	G	AUS	2nd	Futurity Stakes	Turf	1,600	M
178	116	Devil May Care (USA)	3	F	USA	1st	Coaching Club American Oaks	Dirt	1,811	M
178	116	Discreetly Mine (USA)	3	C	USA	1st 1st	Amsterdam Stakes; King's Bishop Stakes	Dirt; Dirt	1,308; 1,408	S S
178	116	Dream Eater (IRE)	5	H	GB	3rd 5th 2nd	Queen Anne Stakes; Sussex Stakes; Topkapi Trophy	Turf; Turf; Turf	1,609; 1,609; 1,600	M M M
178	116	Forever Together (USA)	6	M	USA	2nd	Gamely Stakes	Turf	1,811	M
178	116	Fravashi (AUS)	4	C	UAE	2nd	Al Quoz Sprint	Turf	1,200	S
178	116	Girolamo (USA)	4	C	USA	1st 3rd	Vosburgh Stakes; Cigar Mile Handicap	Dirt; Dirt	1,207; 1,609	S M
178	116	Gris de Gris (IRE)	6	H	FR	1st	Prix Edmond Blanc	Turf	1,600	M
178	116	Hot Danish (AUS)	6	M	AUS	1st	Doomben 10,000	Turf	1,350	M
178	116	Ice Box (USA)	3	C	USA	2nd	Kentucky Derby	Dirt	2,012	I
178	116	Jukebox Jury (IRE)	4	C	GB	1st	Jockey Club Stakes	Turf	2,414	L
178	116	Karelian (USA)	8	G	USA	1st	Maker's Mark Mile Stakes	Turf	1,609	M
178	116	Kingsgate Native (IRE)	5	G	GB	1st	Temple Stakes	Turf	1,006	S
178	116	Lady of the Desert (USA)	3	F	GB	1st	Diadem Stakes	Turf	1,207	S
178	116	Metal Bender (NZ)	5	G	AUS	1st 3rd 4th	Warwick Stakes; Underwood Stakes; Turnbull Stakes	Turf; Turf; Turf	1,400; 1,800; 2,000	M M I
178	116	Monaco Consul (NZ)	4	C	AUS	3rd	Caulfield Cup	Turf	2,400	L
178	116	Morning Line (USA)	3	C	USA	2nd	Breeders' Cup Dirt Mile	Dirt	1,609	M
178	116	Musket Man (USA)	4	C	USA	2nd 3rd	Metropolitan Handicap; Whitney Handicap	Dirt; Dirt	1,609; 1,811	M M
178	116	Noble's Promise (USA)	3	C	USA	2nd	Rebel Stakes	Dirt	1,710	M
178	116	Oken Bruce Lee (JPN)	5	H	JPN	7th	Japan Cup	Turf	2,400	L
178	116	Plumania (GB)	4	F	FR	2nd	Prix Vermeille	Turf	2,400	L
178	116	Proviso (GB)	5	M	USA	1st	Diana Stakes	Turf	1,811	M
178	116	Quijano (GER)	6	G	GER	3rd 2nd	GNAds4U Handicap; Grosser Preis von Baden	Turf; Turf	2,485; 2,400	L L
178	116	Rainbow Peak (IRE)	4	G	GB	1st 1st	Wolferton Handicap; Gran Premio del Jockey Club	Turf; Turf	2,012; 2,400	I L
178	116	Royal Bench (IRE)	3	C	FR	2nd	Hong Kong Mile	Turf	1,600	M
178	116	Run for Levi (AUS)	3	C	AUS	2nd	Caulfield Guineas	Turf	1,600	M
178	116	Shakespearean (IRE)	3	C	GB	1st	Hungerford Stakes	Turf	1,408	M
178	116	Shamalgan (FR)	3	C	CZE	3rd	Poule d'Essai des Poulains	Turf	1,600	M
178	116	Shimraan (FR)	3	C	FR	1st 5th	Prix Eugène Adam; Prix Dollar	Turf; Turf	2,000; 1,950	I I
178	116	Sight Winner (NZ)	6	G	HK	5th	Chinese Club Challenge Cup	Turf	1,400	M
178	116	Smart Banker (SAF)	5	G	SAF	1st	Horse Chestnut Stakes	Turf	1,600	M
178	116	Smile Jack (JPN)	5	H	JPN	3rd	Yasuda Kinen	Turf	1,600	M
178	116	Star Witness (AUS)	3	C	AUS	1st 2nd	Coolmore Stud Stakes; Patinack Farm Classic	Turf; Turf	1,200; 1,200	S S
178	116	Stotsfold (GB)	7	G	GB	1st 1st	Brigadier Gerard Stakes; Gala Stakes	Turf; Turf	2,018; 2,018	I I
178	116	Super Hornet (JPN)	7	H	JPN	2nd	Yasuda Kinen	Turf	1,600	M
178	116	Take the Points (USA)	4	C	USA	5th↓ 4th	Gulfstream Park Turf Handicap; Manhattan Handicap	Turf; Turf	1,811; 2,012	M I
178	116	Tosen Jordan (JPN)	4	C	JPN	5th	Arima Kinen	Turf	2,500	L
178	116	Tropical Empire (AUS)	7	H	SAF	1st	Drill Hall Stakes	Turf	1,400	M
178	116	Turffontein (AUS)	5	H	AUS	1st	William Reid Stakes	Turf	1,200	S
178	116	Voila Ici (IRE)	5	H	ITY	2nd	Premio Presidente della Repubblica	Turf	2,000	I
178	116	Wall Street (NZ)	6	G	NZ	1st 1st	Spring Classic; Emirates Stakes	Turf; Turf	2,040; 1,600	I M
178	116	Worthadd (IRE)	3	C	ITY	3rd 1st	Premio Vittorio di Capua; Premio Ribot	Turf; Turf	1,600; 1,600	M M
178	116	Xtension (IRE)	3	C	GB	4th 3rd	2,000 Guineas Stakes; Prix Jean Prat	Turf; Turf	1,609; 1,600	M M
228	115	A Shin Forward (USA)	5	H	JPN	1st 4th=	Mile Championship; Hong Kong Mile	Turf; Turf	1,600; 1,600	M M
228	115	Albert the Fat (AUS)	5	G	AUS	1st	BTC Cup	Turf	1,200	S
228	115	Alianthus (GER)	5	H	GER	1st	Grosser Preis von Düsseldorf	Turf	1,700	M
228	115	Ashiyla (FR)	3	F	FR	4th	Prix Vermeille	Turf	2,400	L
228	115	At First Sight (IRE)	3	C	IRE	2nd	Epsom Derby	Turf	2,423	L
228	115	Big Week (JPN)	3	C	JPN	1st	Kikuka Sho	Turf	3,000	E
228	115	Blue Tiger (SAF)	5	H	SAF	2nd	Rising Sun Gold Challenge	Turf	1,600	M
228	115	Bribon (FR)	7	G	USA	1st 3rd	True North Handicap; Alfred G. Vanderbilt Handicap	Dirt; Dirt	1,207; 1,207	S S
228	115	California Flag (USA)	6	G	USA	3rd	Al Quoz Sprint	Turf	1,200	S
228	115	Calming Influence (IRE)	5	H	UAE	1st	Godolphin Mile	Artificial	1,600	M
228	115	Champagne d'Oro (USA)	3	F	USA	1st	Test Stakes	Dirt	1,408	S
228	115	Chinchon (IRE)	5	H	FR	1st 1st	Prix Exbury; United Nations Stakes	Turf; Turf	2,000; 2,213	I L
228	115	Chinese White (IRE)	5	M	IRE	1st	Pretty Polly Stakes	Turf	2,012	I
228	115	Cost of Freedom (USA)	7	G	USA	1st 1st	Los Angeles Handicap; Vernon O. Underwood Stakes	Artificial; Artificial	1,207; 1,207	S S
228	115	Crowded House (GB)	4	C	GB; USA	2nd 2nd	Al Maktoum Challenge R2; Pacific Classic Stakes	Artificial; Artificial	1,900; 2,012	I I
228	115	Crystal Capella (GB)	5	M	GB	1st	Pride Stakes	Turf	2,414	L
228	115	Dancing in Silks (USA)	5	G	USA	3rd	Palos Verdes Handicap	Artificial	1,207	S
228	115	Danon Chantilly (JPN)	3	C	JPN	1st	NHK Mile Cup	Turf	1,600	M
228	115	Deem (IRE)	5	M	KSA	4th	Dubai Sheema Classic	Turf	2,410	L
228	115	Denman (AUS)	3	C	AUS	1st 1st 1st	Zeditave Stakes; Manfred Stakes; D'Urban Stakes	Turf; Turf; Turf	1,200; 1,400; 1,400	S M M
228	115	Doubtful Jack (AUS)	4	G	AUS	1st	Bobbie Lewis Quality Handicap	Turf	1,200	S
228	115	Duke of Mischief (USA)	4	C	USA	1st	Philip H. Iselin Stakes	Dirt	1,811	M
228	115	Eastern Anthem (IRE)	6	H	UAE	6th	Dubai Sheema Classic	Turf	2,410	L
228	115	Eclair de Lune (GER)	4	F	USA	1st	Beverly D. Stakes	Turf	1,911	I
228	115	Elusive Pimpernel (USA)	3	C	GB	1st 5th	Craven Stakes; 2,000 Guineas Stakes	Turf; Turf	1,609; 1,609	M M
228	115	Evening Jewel (USA)	3	F	USA	2nd 1st	Kentucky Oaks; Del Mar Oaks	Dirt; Turf	1,811; 1,811	M M
228	115	First Dude (USA)	3	C	USA	2nd 3rd	Preakness Stakes; Belmont Stakes	Dirt; Dirt	1,911; 2,414	I L
228	115	Flying Cross (IRE)	3	C	IRE	3rd	Irish St. Leger	Turf	2,816	E
228	115	Furioso (JPN)	6	H	JPN	2nd 1st 1st	Kashiwa Kinen; Teio Sho; Nippon TV Hai	Dirt; Dirt; Dirt	1,600; 2,000; 1,800	M I M
228	115	Gabby's Golden Gal (USA)	4	F	USA	1st	Santa Monica Handicap	Artificial	1,408	S
228	115	Gentoo (FR)	6	G	FR	1st	Prix Royal-Oak	Turf	3,100	E
228	115	Ginga Dude (NZ)	7	G	NZ	3rd	Mackinnon Stakes	Turf	2,000	I
228	115	Glass Harmonium (IRE)	4	C	GB	1st 3rd 6th 6th	Gordon Richards Stakes; Brigadier Gerard Stakes; Prince of Wales's Stakes; Champion Stakes	Turf; Turf; Turf; Turf	2,018; 2,018; 2,012; 2,012	I I I I
228	115	Grassy (USA)	4	C	USA	3rd	Joe Hirsch Turf Classic Invitational	Turf	2,414	L
228	115	Hamazing Destiny (USA)	4	C	USA	2nd	Breeders' Cup Sprint	Dirt	1,207	S
228	115	Harris Tweed (NZ)	5	G	NZ	2nd	Caulfield Cup	Turf	2,400	L
228	115	High Heeled (IRE)	4	F	GB	3rd	Coronation Cup	Turf	2,423	L
228	115	Jackson Bend (USA)	3	C	USA	3rd	Preakness Stakes	Dirt	1,911	I
228	115	Jan Vermeer (IRE)	3	C	IRE	1st 3rd	Gallinule Stakes; Irish Derby	Turf; Turf	2,012; 2,414	I L
228	115	Joanna (IRE)	3	F	FR	2nd	Prix Maurice de Gheest	Turf	1,300	S
228	115	Joshua Tree (IRE)	3	C	IRE	1st	Canadian International	Turf	2,414	L
228	115	Kane Hekili (JPN)	8	H	JPN	1st	Mercury Cup	Dirt	2,000	I
228	115	Kapil (SAF)	7	G	SAF	2nd	Queen's Plate (SAF)	Turf	1,600	M
228	115	Keertana (USA)	4	F	USA	1st 3rd	Glens Falls Handicap; Breeders' Cup Filly & Mare Turf	Turf; Turf	2,213; 2,213	L L
228	115	Kidnapping (IRE)	3	C	ITY	3rd	Prix Niel	Turf	2,400	L
228	115	Laaheb (GB)	4	G	GB	1st 1st	September Stakes; Cumberland Lodge Stakes	Artificial; Turf	2,414; 2,414	L L
228	115	Life Is Sweet (USA)	4	F	USA	2nd	Santa Maria Handicap	Artificial	1,710	M
228	115	Littorio (AUS)	5	G	AUS	1st	The BMW	Turf	2,400	L
228	115	Logi Universe (JPN)	4	C	JPN	2nd	Sapporo Kinen	Turf	2,000	I
228	115	Lord Chaparral (IRE)	3	C	ITY	2nd	Gran Premio del Jockey Club	Turf	2,400	L
228	115	Love Conquers All (AUS)	4	C	AUS	1st	Missile Stakes	Turf	1,200	S
228	115	Lucky Nine (IRE)	3	G	HK	7th	Hong Kong Sprint	Turf	1,200	S
228	115	Marsh Side (USA)	7	H	USA	1st	Sky Classic Stakes	Turf	2,012	I
228	115	Melito (AUS)	3	F	AUS	1st 1st	T. J. Smith Stakes; Winter Stakes	Turf; Turf	1,200; 1,400	S M
228	115	Midshipman (USA)	4	C	UAE	1st	Meydan Metropolis	Artificial	1,400	M
228	115	Misremembered (USA)	4	C	USA	1st	Santa Anita Handicap	Artificial	2,012	I
228	115	Monterosso (GB)	3	C	GB	1st	King Edward VII Stakes	Turf	2,414	L
228	115	Mr Brock (SAF)	6	G	UAE	3rd 8th	Al Maktoum Challenge R3; Dubai World Cup	Artificial; Artificial	2,000; 2,000	I I
228	115	Mr Medici (IRE)	5	H	HK	2nd 1st	Chairman's Trophy; Champions & Chater Cup	Turf; Turf	1,600; 2,400	M L
228	115	Neko Bay (USA)	7	H	USA	2nd	Santa Anita Handicap	Artificial	2,012	I
228	115	Never Bouchon (JPN)	7	H	JPN	1st 4th 5th 5th	American Jockey Club Cup; QE II Cup; Takarazuka Kinen; Tenno Sho (Autumn)	Turf; Turf; Turf; Turf	2,200; 2,000; 2,200; 2,000	L I L I
228	115	Ouqba (GB)	4	C	GB	2nd	Lockinge Stakes	Turf	1,609	M
228	115	Pain Perdu (FR)	3	C	FR	3rd	Prix du Jockey Club	Turf	2,100	I
228	115	Persistently (USA)	4	F	USA	1st	Personal Ensign Stakes	Dirt	2,012	I
228	115	Playing God (AUS)	3	C	AUS	1st	Kingston Town Classic	Turf	1,800	M
228	115	Rahystrada (USA)	6	H	USA	3rd 1st	Tampa Bay Breeders' Cup; Arlington Handicap	Turf; Turf	1,710; 2,012	M I
228	115	Rajsaman (FR)	3	C	FR	4th=	Hong Kong Mile	Turf	1,600	M
228	115	Red Desire (JPN)	4	F	JPN	1st	Al Maktoum Challenge R3	Artificial	2,000	I
228	115	Redding Colliery (USA)	4	C	USA	1st 1st	Lone Star Park Handicap; Hawthorne Gold Cup Handicap	Dirt; Dirt	1,710; 2,012	M I
228	115	Redwood (GB)	4	C	GB	2nd 1st 2nd 1st 2nd	Princess of Wales's Stakes; Glorious Stakes; Grand Prix de Deauville; Northern Dancer Turf Stakes; Hong Kong Vase	Turf; Turf; Turf; Turf; Turf	2,414; 2,414; 2,500; 2,414; 2,400	L L L L L
228	115	Rightly So (USA)	4	F	USA	1st	Ballerina Stakes	Dirt	1,408	S
228	115	Rock Classic (AUS)	3	G	AUS	1st	Australian Guineas	Turf	1,600	M
228	115	Rudra (SAF)	5	H	SAF	2nd	Champions Challenge	Turf	2,000	I
228	115	Rulership (JPN)	3	C	JPN	6th	Arima Kinen	Turf	2,500	L
228	115	Sandbar (GB)	3	F	FR	3rd	Prix de Diane	Turf	2,100	I
228	115	Sea Lord (IRE)	3	C	GB	1st 5th	Totesport Mile; Irish Champion Stakes	Turf; Turf	1,609; 2,012	M I
228	115	Sehrezad (IRE)	5	H	GER	2nd	Premio Ribot	Turf	1,600	M
228	115	Shellscrape (AUS)	4	C	AUS	3rd	The Shorts	Turf	1,200	S
228	115	Snaafy (USA)	6	H	UAE	1st	Range Rover Trophy	Turf	1,600	M
228	115	Sniper's Bullet (AUS)	6; 6; 7	G	AUS	3rd 3rd 2nd	William Reid Stakes; Futurity Stakes; Moonga Stakes	Turf; Turf; Turf	1,200; 1,600; 1,400	S M M
228	115	Society Rock (IRE)	3	C	GB	2nd	Golden Jubilee Stakes	Turf	1,207	S
228	115	Sri Putra (GB)	4	C	GB	2nd 2nd	Eclipse Stakes; Glorious Stakes	Turf; Turf	2,018; 2,414	I L
228	115	St Trinians (GB)	5	M	USA	2nd	Vanity Handicap	Artificial	1,811	M
228	115	Stately Victor (USA)	3	C	USA	1st	Blue Grass Stakes	Artificial	1,811	M
228	115	Stimulation (IRE)	5	H	GB	4th	Prince of Wales's Stakes	Turf	2,012	I
228	115	Switch (USA)	3	F	USA	2nd 1st	Lady's Secret Stakes; La Brea Stakes	Artificial; Dirt	1,710; 1,408	M S
228	115	Telling (USA)	6	H	USA	1st	Sword Dancer Invitational	Turf	2,414	L
228	115	Thumbs Up (NZ)	5; 5; 6	G	HK	2nd 2nd 1st	Stewards' Cup; Hong Kong Gold Cup; Sha Tin Trophy	Turf; Turf; Turf	1,600; 2,000; 1,600	M I M
228	115	Transcend (JPN)	4	C	JPN	1st	Japan Cup Dirt	Dirt	1,800	M
228	115	Triple Honour (NZ)	6	G	AUS	2nd	Warwick Stakes	Turf	1,400	M
228	115	Triumph March (JPN)	4	C	JPN	4th	Yasuda Kinen	Turf	1,600	M
228	115	Ultra Fantasy (AUS)	8	G	HK	1st	Sprinters Stakes	Turf	1,200	S
228	115	Vermilion (JPN)	8	H	JPN	1st	Kawasaki Kinen	Dirt	2,100	I
228	115	Vertigineux (FR)	6	H	FR	2nd	Summer Mile Stakes	Turf	1,609	M
228	115	Victor's Cry (USA)	5	H	USA	1st 2nd 1st	Shoemaker Mile Stakes; Eddie Read Handicap; Citation Handicap	Turf; Turf; Turf	1,609; 1,811; 1,710	M M M
228	115	Vigor (NZ)	6	G	AUS	3rd	Makybe Diva Stakes	Turf	1,600	M
228	115	Vosne Romanee (NZ)	7	G	NZ	1st	New Zealand Stakes	Turf	2,000	I
228	115	War Artist (AUS)	6	G	GB	1st	Al Shindagha Sprint	Artificial	1,200	S
228	115	Warrior's Reward (USA)	4	C	USA	1st 2nd	Carter Handicap; Churchill Downs Stakes	Dirt; Dirt	1,408; 1,408	S S
228	115	Wasted Tears (USA)	5	M	USA	1st	Jenny Wiley Stakes	Turf	1,710	M
228	115	Wiener Walzer (GER)	4	C	GER	5th	Prince of Wales's Stakes	Turf	2,012	I
228	115	Zabrasive (NZ)	3	G	AUS	1st 4th	Rosehill Guineas; Australian Derby	Turf; Turf	2,000; 2,400	I L

== Top ranked horses ==
The following table shows the top ranked horses overall, the top three-year-olds, the top older horses and the top fillies and mares in the 2010 Rankings. It also shows the leading performers in various subdivisions of each group, which are defined by the distances of races, and the surfaces on which they are run.

All Horses
	All Surfaces		Dirt / Artificial		Turf	
All Distances	135	Harbinger	129	Blame	135	Harbinger
Sprint	123	Black Caviar	119	Big Drama; Kinsale King; Majesticperfection	123	Black Caviar
Mile	128	Makfi; Quality Road	128	Quality Road	128	Makfi
Intermediate	129	Blame	129	Blame	126	Cape Blanco; Rip Van Winkle; So You Think
Long	135	Harbinger	117	Drosselmeyer	135	Harbinger
Extended	122	So You Think		not listed	122	So You Think
Three-Year-Olds
	All Surfaces		Dirt / Artificial		Turf	
All Distances	128	Makfi; Workforce	124	Eskendereya; Lookin at Lucky	128	Makfi; Workforce
Sprint	121	Starspangledbanner	117	Smiling Tiger	121	Starspangledbanner
Mile	128	Makfi	124	Eskendereya; Lookin at Lucky	128	Makfi
Intermediate	126	Cape Blanco	123	Fly Down	126	Cape Blanco
Long	128	Workforce	117	Drosselmeyer	128	Workforce
Extended	120	Arctic Cosmos		not listed	120	Arctic Cosmos
Older Horses
	All Surfaces		Dirt / Artificial		Turf	
All Distances	135	Harbinger	129	Blame	135	Harbinger
Sprint	123	Black Caviar	119	Big Drama; Kinsale King; Majesticperfection	123	Black Caviar
Mile	128	Quality Road	128	Quality Road	125	Goldikova; Rip Van Winkle
Intermediate	129	Blame	129	Blame	126	Rip Van Winkle; So You Think
Long	135	Harbinger	115	Laaheb	135	Harbinger
Extended	122	So You Think		not listed	122	So You Think
Fillies and Mares
	All Surfaces		Dirt / Artificial		Turf	
All Distances	125	Goldikova; Zenyatta	125	Zenyatta	125	Goldikova
Sprint	123	Black Caviar	117	Dubai Majesty	123	Black Caviar
Mile	125	Goldikova; Zenyatta	125	Zenyatta	125	Goldikova
Intermediate	125	Zenyatta	125	Zenyatta	121	Buena Vista; Lily of the Valley; Midday
Long	121	Buena Vista; Midday; Sarafina		not listed	121	Buena Vista; Midday; Sarafina
Extended		not listed		not listed		not listed

== Guide ==
A complete guide to the main table above.

Rank
A horse's position in the list, with the most highly rated at number 1. Each horse is ranked once according to its highest rating. Any lesser ratings for the same horse are not ranked.

Rating
A rating represents a weight value in pounds, with higher values given to horses which showed greater ability. It is judged that these weights would equalise the abilities of the horses if carried in a theoretical handicap race. The minimum rating required for inclusion is 115.

Horse
Each horse's name is followed by a suffix (from the IFHA's International Code of Suffixes) which indicates the country foaled.

Age
The age of the horse at the time it achieved its rating. The racing ages of all horses foaled in a particular part of the world increase simultaneously, regardless of the actual date of foaling.
Dates of age increase by location foaled
Northern Hemisphere	1 January
South America	1 July
Australia, New Zealand and South Africa	1 August

Sex
C	Colt	Ungelded male horse up to four-years-old
F	Filly	Female horse up to four-years-old
H	Horse	Ungelded male horse over four-years-old
M	Mare	Female horse over four-years-old
G	Gelding	Gelded male horse of any age

Trained
The country where the horse was trained at the time of the rating, abbreviated using the International Code of Suffixes.

Position
The horse's finishing position in the race shown. The actual finishing order can sometimes be amended following an inquiry or a disqualification.
=	Dead-heat
↑	Promoted from original finishing position
↓	Relegated from original finishing position

Race
The race (or one of the races) for which the horse achieved its rating. A defeated horse can be rated above its higher-placed opponents if it carried more weight.

Surface
The surface of the track on which the race was run, eg. turf or dirt. Synthetic surfaces are described as "artificial".

Distance
The distance of the race in metres. In some countries (eg. Canada, Great Britain, Ireland and the United States), the length of a race is usually expressed in miles and furlongs. These units have been converted to metres to allow for universal comparison.
Common conversions
5 furlongs	= 1,006 m	1 mile and 1½ furlongs	= 1,911 m
6 furlongs	= 1,207 m	1 mile and 2 furlongs	= 2,012 m
6½ furlongs	= 1,308 m	1 mile and 2½ furlongs	= 2,112 m
7 furlongs	= 1,408 m	1 mile and 3 furlongs	= 2,213 m
7½ furlongs	= 1,509 m	1 mile and 4 furlongs	= 2,414 m
1 mile	= 1,609 m	1 mile and 6 furlongs	= 2,816 m
1 mile and ½ furlong	= 1,710 m	2 miles	= 3,219 m
1 mile and 1 furlong	= 1,811 m	2 miles and 4 furlongs	= 4,023 m

Category
		Metres	Furlongs
S	Sprint	1,000–1,300; 1,000–1,599 (CAN / USA)	5–6.5; 5–7.99 (CAN / USA)
M	Mile	1,301–1,899; 1,600–1,899 (CAN / USA)	6.51–9.49; 8–9.49 (CAN / USA)
I	Intermediate	1,900–2,100	9.5–10.5
L	Long	2,101–2,700	10.51–13.5
E	Extended	2,701+	13.51+

International Code of Suffixes
The following countries have been represented in the WTR as foaling or training locations since the first edition in 2004.
ARG	Argentina	ITY	Italy
AUS	Australia	JPN	Japan
BRZ	Brazil	KSA	Saudi Arabia
CAN	Canada	NZ	New Zealand
CHI	Chile	SAF	South Africa
CZE	Czech Republic	SIN	Singapore
FR	France	SPA	Spain
GB	Great Britain	TUR	Turkey
GER	Germany	UAE	United Arab Emirates
HK	Hong Kong	USA	United States
HUN	Hungary	VEN	Venezuela
IRE	Ireland	ZIM	Zimbabwe

Shading
The shaded areas represent lesser ratings recorded by horses which were more highly rated in a different category. The IFHA publishes this information when the lower rating is the overall top performance in a particular category.
