= Music Show =

Irish–British thoroughbred racehorse

- Sire: Noverre
- Grandsire: Rahy
- Dam: Dreamboat
- Damsire: Mr. Prospector
- Sex: Mare
- Foaled: 18 April 2007
- Country: Ireland
- Colour: Bay
- Breeder: Darley Stud
- Owner: Jaber Abdullah
- Trainer: Mick Channon
- Record: 17: 5-1-2
- Earnings: £349,968

Major wins
- Rockfel Stakes (2009); Nell Gwyn Stakes (2010); Falmouth Stakes (2010)

Music Show (foaled 18 April 2007) is an Irish-bred British-trained Thoroughbred racehorse and broodmare, who was rated one of the best fillies of her generation in the world in 2010. She showed great promise as a two-year-old in 2009, when she won three of her four races including the Group Two Rockfel. In the following year, she performed consistently in the highest class, winning the Nell Gwyn Stakes and the Falmouth Stakes, as well as finishing second in the Prix Rothschild, third in the Irish 1000 Guineas and Matron Stakes and fourth in the Coronation Stakes and Sun Chariot Stakes. In the following year, she failed to reproduce her best form and was well-beaten in all five of her starts.

== Background ==
Music Show is a bay mare with no white markings bred in Ireland by the Darley Stud. She was sired by Noverre, a top-class miles who won the Sussex Stakes in 2001 and finished second or third in ten other Group One races. As a breeding stallion, his other good winners included Le Havre (winner of the Prix du Jockey Club), I'm A Dreamer (Beverly D. Stakes), Miss Lucifer (Challenge Stakes), Summit Surge (York Stakes) and Enora (Preis der Diana). Music Show's dam Dreamboat showed modest ability as a racehorse, winning one minor race at Redcar Racecourse in 1995. She was a granddaughter of the Canadian Champion Three-Year-Old Filly Kadar who was in turn a daughter of the outstanding Canadian racemare Square Angel whose other descendants included Swain and Fantastic Light.

In September 2008 the filly was sent to the Tattersalls Ireland sale but failed to reach her reserve price of €4,000. In the following May she was entered in the Goresbridge "breeze-up" sale (in which two-year-olds are required to gallop in public before being auctioned) and was bought for €16,000 by the bloodstock agent Gill Richardson. During her track career, Music Show raced in the colours of Jaber Abdullah and was trained at West Ilsley by Mick Channon.

== Racing career ==
=== 2009: two-year-old season ===
Music Show's debut came at Bath Racecourse on 9 August when she contested a maiden auction race. She was ridden by Tony Culhane and started at odds of 6/1 against thirteen opponents. Carrying top weight of 124 pounds, she raced towards the rear of the field before taking the lead a furlong out and winning by two and a half lengths from the favourite Zelos Dream. At the same course, over the same five and a half furlong distance three weeks later the filly started odds-on for a novice race (for horses with no more than one previous win) in which she was again partnered by Culhane. She took the lead a furlong out and drew away from her four opponents to win "easily" by three and a quarter lengths from Ramarama. Alan Munro took over from Culhane when Music Show was moved up in class for the Group Three Firth of Clyde Stakes at Ayr Racecourse on 19 September. Starting the 5/1 choice in the betting she finished tenth of the thirteen runners behind Distinctive, appearing disadvantaged by a poor draw which saw her racing on the unfavoured stands-side of the course.

Despite her defeat at Ayr, Music Show was stepped up again for the Group Two Rockfel Stakes over seven furlongs at Newmarket Racecourse on 17 October when she was ridden by Kieren Fallon. The Oh So Sharp Stakes winner Tabassum started favourite ahead of Distinctive, Dubawi Heights (third in the Lowther Stakes) and the Barry Hills-trained Champagnelifestyle with Music Show a 25/1 outsider in an eleven-runner field. After racing in mid-division, Music Show was switched to the right in the last quarter mile and produced a strong late run, overtaking the Irish filly Atasari and the favoured Tabassum in the final strides to by a neck and three quarters of a length. After the race Channon said "We thought should win at Ayr and then the plan was then to go for Chevley Park. However everything went wrong and we had to go back to the drawing board. After that performance we know exactly where she will be going [the 1000 Guineas]. We got lucky for Jaber Abdullah [owner] again and Kieren gave her a great ride."

=== 2010: three-year-old season ===
Music Show began her second season in the Nell Gwyn Stakes (a major trial race for the 1000 Guineas) over seven furlongs at Newmarket in April. She started second favourite behind Atasari in an eleven-runner field and as in her previous races she was held up in the early running before making a strong late run. She went to the front approaching the last furlong and was "driven out" by Fallon to win by half a length from Blue Maiden. Mick Channon commented "You would have to be pleased with that as she has got very lazy this year and I wanted to get a run into her... I have always thought she had a lot of class and Kieren didn't mess about – he knew what he had under him". Ryan Moore took over for the filly's next three races starting with the 2010 1000 Guineas on 2 May in which she started the 7/1 third favourite. The field split into two groups on either side of the course and although Music Show proved the best of the group on the stands side (the left side from the jockey's viewpoint) she finished sixth overall behind Jacqueline Quest (disqualified), Special Duty and three others who raced on the opposite side. Three weeks later she started favourite for the Irish 1000 Guineas at the Curragh but despite a strong late run she finished third behind Bethrah and Anna Sallai, beaten less than half a length in a "blanket finish".

Music Show returned to England for the Coronation Stakes at Royal Ascot on 18 June. After being held up as usual she made steady progress in the straight without ever looking likely to win and finished fourth behind Lillie Langtry, Gile Na Greine and Jacqueline Quest. On 7 July Music Show was matched against older fillies and mares for the first time in the Group One Falmouth Stakes over one mile on the July Course at Newmarket in which she was ridden by Richard Hughes and started at odds of 13/2. Lillie Langtry (the 9/4 favourite), Special Duty and Gile Na Greine were again in opposition whilst the other three-year-old in the field was the Jersey Stakes winner Rainfall. The senior contingent comprised Strawberrydaiquiri (Dahlia Stakes, Windsor Forest Stakes), Spacious (2009 Windsor Forest Stakes) and Lahaleeb (E. P. Taylor Stakes). She raced towards the rear of the field as first Strawberrydaiquiri and then Spacious set the pace, but began to make progress in the last quarter mile. After being switched to the right to obtain a clear run she took the lead inside the final furlong and drew away in the closing strides to win by two lengths from Spacious. After the race Channon said "We always believed she was the best three-year-old filly in the country, but sometimes the faith falls away; but with this filly it never did. In both Guineas she was trapped out wide and then when she was beaten at Ascot, I was in bits." Hughes commented "They went nice and fast today and she did it very well. Mick kept telling me she'd had no luck in running and I'd been watching her, she was forced wide at Ascot because of her draw but she was very good today."

She was then sent to France for the Prix Rothschild over 1600 metres at Deauville Racecourse in August in which she was matched against the outstanding French racemare Goldikova. In a change of tactics, she raced in second place before taking the lead but was overtaken 400 metres out by Goldikova and beaten three lengths into second place. On 4 September Music Show started favourite for the Matron Stakes at Leopardstown Racecourse in which she was ridden by Fran Berry and finished third behind Lillie Langtry and Spacious. She was reunited with Hughes for the Sun Chariot Stakes at Newmarket and again started favourite but finished fourth of the eleven runners behind Sahpresa, Strawberrydaiquiri and Rainfall.

In the 2010 World Thoroughbred Rankings Music Show was rated the joint-fourth-best three-year-old filly in the world behind Lily of the Valley, Sarafina and Snow Fairy.

=== 2011: four-year-old season ===
On her 2011 debut Music Show was matched against male opponents for the first time since 2009 and finished fourth of the five runners behind Dick Turpin in the Sandown Mile. She then returned to racing against her own sex but failed to win in four subsequent races. She finished a remote fourth to Midday in the Middleton Stakes over ten and a half furlongs at York in May and then finished unplaced in the Windsor Forest Stakes at Royal Ascot. In September Music Show was sent to Turkey for the Istanbul European Capital of Culture Trophy at Veliefendi Race Course and finished fourth behind the German-trained favourite Vanjura. Later that month she made her final appearance when she contested the Sun Chariot Stakes for the second time. Ridden by Hughes she was a 16/1 outsider and finished fifth of the eight runners behind Sahpresa.

== Pedigree ==
Pedigree of Music Show (IRE), bay mare 2007
Sire Noverre (USA) 1998	Rahy (USA); 1985	Blushing Groom	Red God
Sire Noverre (USA) 1998	Rahy (USA); 1985	Blushing Groom	Runaway Bride
Sire Noverre (USA) 1998	Rahy (USA); 1985	Glorious Song	Halo
Sire Noverre (USA) 1998	Rahy (USA); 1985	Glorious Song	Ballade
Sire Noverre (USA) 1998	Danseur Fabuleux (USA); 1982	Northern Dancer	Nearctic
Sire Noverre (USA) 1998	Danseur Fabuleux (USA); 1982	Northern Dancer	Natalma
Sire Noverre (USA) 1998	Danseur Fabuleux (USA); 1982	Fabuleux Jane	Le Fabuleux
Sire Noverre (USA) 1998	Danseur Fabuleux (USA); 1982	Fabuleux Jane	Native Partner
Dam Dreamboat (USA) 1992	Mr. Prospector (USA); 1970	Raise a Native	Native Dancer
Dam Dreamboat (USA) 1992	Mr. Prospector (USA); 1970	Raise a Native	Raise You
Dam Dreamboat (USA) 1992	Mr. Prospector (USA); 1970	Gold Digger	Nashua
Dam Dreamboat (USA) 1992	Mr. Prospector (USA); 1970	Gold Digger	Sequence
Dam Dreamboat (USA) 1992	Gorgeous (USA); 1986	Slew o' Gold	Seattle Slew
Dam Dreamboat (USA) 1992	Gorgeous (USA); 1986	Slew o' Gold	Alluvial
Dam Dreamboat (USA) 1992	Gorgeous (USA); 1986	Kamar	Key to the Mint
Dam Dreamboat (USA) 1992	Gorgeous (USA); 1986	Kamar	Square Angel (Family: 14-c)
