= Dick Turpin (horse, foaled 2007) =

Irish-bred Thoroughbred racehorse

- Racing silks of John Manley
- Sire: Arakan
- Grandsire: Nureyev
- Dam: Merrily
- Damsire: Sharrood
- Sex: Stallion
- Foaled: 30 April 2007
- Country: Ireland
- Colour: Brown
- Breeder: John McEnery
- Owner: John Manley
- Trainer: Richard Hannon, Sr
- Record: 20: 9-3-1
- Earnings: £977,579

Major wins
- Richmond Stakes (2009); Tattersalls Ireland Sale Stakes (2009); Greenham Stakes (2010); Prix Jean Prat (2010); Sandown Mile (2011); Summer Mile Stakes (2011); Premio Vittorio di Capua (2011)

Dick Turpin (foaled 30 April 2007) is an Irish-bred, British-trained Thoroughbred racehorse and sire. In three years of racing he won nine of his twenty races, showing consistent top-class form over distances of around one mile. As a two-year-old in 2009 he won the first four of his six races including the Richmond Stakes and the Tattersalls Ireland Sale Stakes. In the following year he won the Greenham Stakes and the Prix Jean Prat, finished second in the 2000 Guineas, Poule d'Essai des Poulains and St James's Palace Stakes and ran third in the Prix de la Forêt. As a four-year-old in 2011 he added victories in the Sandown Mile, Summer Mile Stakes and Premio Vittorio di Capua before being retired to stud at the end of the year.

== Background ==
Dick Turpin is a bay horse with a white star and snip and four white socks bred by John McEnery at the Rossenarra Stud in Kells, County Kilkenny. As a foal in November 2007 he was offered for sale at Goffs and was bought for €12,000 by Noel McDonnell. A year later he returned to the auction ring at Tattersalls and was sold to Peter Doyle Bloodstock for €26,000. He entered into the ownership of John Manley and was sent into training with Richard Hannon, Sr at East Everleigh in Wiltshire.

His sire, Arakan, was an American-bred horse who raced in Europe, winning the Criterion Stakes in 2004 and the Supreme Stakes in 2005. Apart from Dick Turpin, the best of his progeny has been the Toormore. Dick Turpin's dam Merrily showed no racing ability, failing to win in twelve starts. She was a great-granddaughter of Vareta, a French broodmare who won the Prix de la Forêt in 1955 and whose other descendants included Zeddaan (Poule d'Essai des Poulains), Shafaraz (Prix du Cadran), Ashkalani (Poule d'Essai des Poulains, Prix du Moulin) and Zalaiyka (Poule d'Essai des Pouliches).

== Racing career ==
=== 2009: two-year-old season ===
Dick Turpin was ridden in five of his six races in 2009 by Richard Hughes. He made his racecourse debut in a maiden race over six furlongs at Windsor Racecourse on 8 June in which he started at odds of 3/1 and won "unchallenged" by four and a half lengths from fourteen opponents. On 11 July he was ridden by Pat Dobbs when he followed up in a minor event at Salisbury Racecourse, winning "readily" by six lengths at odds of 8/11. On 31 July the colt was stepped up in class for the Group 2 Richmond Stakes at Goodwood Racecourse and started the 6/5 favourite ahead of eight opponents including Rakaan (third in the Coventry Stakes) and Buzzword. After disputing the lead from the start he "stormed clear" in the closing stages to win by three lengths from Buzzword. Hughes commented "He takes a bit of time to get rolling once you switch him off. He's a very tall horse, with a huge stride. He needs a little break now, as he's a bit on the weak side." On 22 August he was sent to Ireland for the Tattersalls Ireland Sale Stakes at Fairyhouse, a race restricted to horses sold at the 2008 Tattersalls yearling sales. Despite conceding five pounds to his opponents he started the 8/15 favourite and won "easily" by one and a half lengths from Dragon Fighter. The colt's assistant trainer Richard Hannon Jr. said "I think that's our sixth winner of this race but none were better than him... He's won a Group Two so the next step would have to be a Group One, whether that is this year or next. He could be a Guineas horse next year".

On 4 October Dick Turpin was sent to France and moved up to Group 1 class for the Prix Jean-Luc Lagardère over 1400 metres at Longchamp Racecourse. He started the second choice in the betting in a seven-runner field but after racing towards the rear he was unable to catch the leaders and came home fifth behind Siyouni, Pounced, Buzzword and Lope de Vega. Thirteen days later the colt contested the Dewhurst Stakes over seven furlongs at Newmarket Racecourse and finished sixth of the fifteen runners behind Beethoven.

=== 2010: three-year-old season ===
On 17 April Dick Turpin made his three-year-old debut in the Greenham Stakes (a trial race for the 2000 Guineas) over seven furlongs at Newbury Racecourse and started the 8/1 third choice behind his stablemate Canford Cliffs and Arcano in a five-runner field. Ridden for the first time by Ryan Moore he tracked the front-running Canford Cliffs before taking the lead inside the final furlong and winning by half a length. In the 2000 Guineas over the Rowley Mile on 1 May Dick Turpin, a 16/1 outsider, took the lead three furlongs out but was overtaken inside the final furlong and beaten intoecond place by Makfi with Canford Cliffs in third, Xtension fourth and the favourite St Nicholas Abbey in sixth. Fifteen days later the colt was sent to France for the Poule d'Essai des Poulains at Longchamp finished second of the fifteen runners, beaten half a length by Lope de Vega with Buzzword, Siyouni and Poet's Voice unplaced.

In the St James's Palace Stakes at Royal Ascot Dick Turpin finished runner-up in a Group 1 race for the third time in a row when he was beaten a length by Canford Cliffs with Siyouni, Beethoven and Makfi finishing behind. Richard Hughes resumed the ride when the colt was sent to France again for the Group 1 Prix Jean Prat over 1600 metres at Chantilly Racecourse on 4 July and started at 5/1. Lope de Vega started favourite, while the other six runners included Siyouni, Xtension and Hearts of Fire (Gran Criterium). After racing in third place behind the pacemaker Altair Star and Lope de Vega Dick Turpin took the lead 400 metres from the finish and accelerated away from the field to win "easily" by four lengths. Richard Hughes commented "You get some horses like that which never get to win one and finish second all the time but, now Dick Turpin's broken his duck, the pressure is off".

At York Racecourse in August Dick Turpin was stepped up in distance for the International Stakes over ten and a half furlongs and came home fifth of the nine runners behind Rip Van Winkle. On his final appearance of the season went back to France for the Prix de la Forêt at Longchamp over 1400 metres and finished third behind Goldikova and Paco Boy, beaten a length by the winner.

In the 2010 World Thoroughbred Rankings Dick Turpin was assessed at 124, making him the fourteenth best horse in the world, and the fifth best three-year-old.

=== 2011: four-year-old season ===
On 23 April 2011 Dick Turpin was dropped back from Group 1 class for the first time in over a year when he started 8/13 favourite for the Group 2 bet365 Mile at Sandown Park. His four opponents were Cityscape (Joel Stakes), Music Show, Dream Eater (City of York Stakes) and Higland Knight. With Hughes in the saddle he raced in third before accelerating into the lead approaching the final furlong and winning by two and a quarter lengths from Cityscape. Hannon commented "He's a very good horse and we have left a bit behind as this was just a stepping stone really" before pointing out the scheduling problems of handling both Dick Turpin and Canford Cliffs saying "I'm lucky to have two of the best milers around and I'd love to keep them separate". Despite Hannon's hopes Dick Turpin was matched against Canford Cliffs in the Lockinge Stakes at Newbury on 11 May and came home fourth behind his stablemate after being hampered approaching the final furlong. Eleven days later he ran poorly in the Prix d'Ispahan and finished last of the nine runners behind Goldikova.

Dick Turpin was dropped back to Group 2 class for the Summer Mile Stakes at Ascot on 9 July and was made the 2/1 second favourite behind the Diomed Stakes winner Side Glance in a five-runner field which also included Red Jazz (Challenge Stakes). Ridden by Pat Dobbs he was settled in fourth place before moving up to take the lead a furlong out and winning by three quarters of a length from Fanunalter. After the race Hannon said "It was firm ground in France and he came back a little jarred up, so we gave him time some time off. He's a good horse, he travels so well and has got a good racing brain". The colt was back in France in August for the Prix Jacques Le Marois at Deauville Racecourse and ran seventh behind Immortal Verse.

On 24 September Dick Turpin was sent to Italy for the Group 1 Premio Vittorio di Capua over 1600 metres at San Siro Racecourse in Milan in which he was ridden by Christophe Soumillon. He started odds-on favourite against six opponents including Cityscape, Fanunalter and the German mare Vanjura. After racing in fifth place he produced a strong run on the outside in the straight, caught Cityscape on the line, and won by a short head. Dick Turpin ended his track career in the Queen Elizabeth II Stakes at Ascot in October in which he came home fifth behind Frankel, Excelebration, Immortal Verse and Dubawi Gold.

In the 2011 World Thoroughbred Rankings Dick Turpin was given a rating of 122 making him the twenty-third best racehorse in the world.

== Stud career ==
Dick Turpin was retired from racing to become a breeding stallion at the National Stud. The best of his offspring have included Vintage Brut (National Stakes, Rockingham Stakes) and Billesdon Bess (Upavon Fillies' Stakes).

== Pedigree ==
Pedigree of Dick Turpin, bay colt, 2007
Sire Arakan (USA) 2000	Nureyev; 1977	Northern Dancer (CAN)	Nearctic
Sire Arakan (USA) 2000	Nureyev; 1977	Northern Dancer (CAN)	Natalma (USA)
Sire Arakan (USA) 2000	Nureyev; 1977	Special	Forli (ARG)
Sire Arakan (USA) 2000	Nureyev; 1977	Special	Thong
Sire Arakan (USA) 2000	Far Across; 1996	Common Grounds	Kris
Sire Arakan (USA) 2000	Far Across; 1996	Common Grounds	Sweetly (FR)
Sire Arakan (USA) 2000	Far Across; 1996	City Ex	Ardross (IRE)
Sire Arakan (USA) 2000	Far Across; 1996	City Ex	Rhythmique (CAN)
Dam Merrily (GB) 1993	Sharrood (USA); 1983	Caro (IRE)	Fortino (FR)
Dam Merrily (GB) 1993	Sharrood (USA); 1983	Caro (IRE)	Chambord (GB)
Dam Merrily (GB) 1993	Sharrood (USA); 1983	Angel Island	Cougar (CHI)
Dam Merrily (GB) 1993	Sharrood (USA); 1983	Angel Island	Who's To Know
Dam Merrily (GB) 1993	Babycham Sparkle; 1980	So Blessed	Princely Gift
Dam Merrily (GB) 1993	Babycham Sparkle; 1980	So Blessed	Lavant
Dam Merrily (GB) 1993	Babycham Sparkle; 1980	Effervescence	Charlottesville
Dam Merrily (GB) 1993	Babycham Sparkle; 1980	Effervescence	Vareta (FR) (Family:11-g)
