= Xaar =

British-bred Thoroughbred racehorse

- Sire: Zafonic
- Grandsire: Gone West
- Dam: Monroe
- Damsire: Sir Ivor
- Sex: Stallion
- Foaled: 14 March 1995
- Country: United Kingdom
- Colour: Bay
- Breeder: Juddmonte Farms
- Owner: Khalid Abdulla; Godolphin
- Trainer: André Fabre; Saeed bin Suroor
- Record: 11:5-3-2
- Earnings: £375,840

Major wins
- Prix de Cabourg (1997); Prix de la Salamandre (1997); Dewhurst Stakes (1997); Craven Stakes (1998)

Awards
- European Champion Two-Yr-Old Colt (1997)

Xaar (14 March 1995 – 16 May 2021) was a British-bred Thoroughbred racehorse and sire, best known for his performances as a two-year-old in 1997. In his juvenile season, he won four of his five races, including the Prix de Cabourg and Prix de la Salamandre in France and the Dewhurst Stakes in England. In 1998, he won the Craven Stakes on his debut, but was beaten in his remaining three races. After two further defeats in 1999, he was retired to stud, where he had limited success as a sire of winners.

== Background ==
Xaar was a very dark-coated bay horse with a white star and strip bred in Britain by Khalid Abdulla's Juddmonte Farms. He was sired by the 2000 Guineas winner Zafonic out of Monroe, a mare who won the Ballyogan Stakes. Monroe's dam, Best In Show, is the ancestor of numerous major winners including El Gran Senor, Jazil, and Rags to Riches. Xaar was sent into training with André Fabre at Chantilly.

== Racing career ==
=== 1997: two-year-old season ===
Xaar made his first racecourse appearance at Maisons Laffitte on 17 June. Ridden by Thierry Jarnet, he won the 1200-metre Prix de la Saône by four lengths from six opponents. In August, the colt was moved up in class for the Group Three Prix de Cabourg at Deauville in which he was ridden for the first time by Olivier Peslier who became his regular jockey for the next two seasons. Starting the 7/10 favourite, Xaar took the lead 150 metres from the finish and won by one and a half lengths from Chargé d'Affaires. He was expected to follow up with a win in the Group One Prix Morny over the same course and distance but after briefly taking the lead in the closing stages, he was overtaken and beaten a head by Chargé d'Affaires.

Xaar and Chargé d'Affaires met for the third time in the Group One Prix de la Salamandre over 1400 metres at Longchamp Racecourse in September. On this occasion, Xaar took the lead 200 metres from the finish and drew clear of his rival to win by three lengths. On his final appearance of the season, Xaar was sent to England to contest the Dewhurst Stakes over seven furlongs at Newmarket Racecourse. He was made 11/8 favourite against five opponents from Britain and one from Ireland. Peslier retrained the colt in the early stages before moving up to take the lead a furlong from the finish. In the closing stages Xaar pulled away from the field to win by seven lengths from the future European Champion Sprinter Tamarisk.

=== 1998: three-year-old season ===
As a three-year-old, Xaar was aimed at the classic 2000 Guineas at Newmarket and began his season in the Craven Stakes over the same course and distance. He started odds-on favourite and won the race, ridden out to defeat the British colt Gulland by a neck. In the Guineas on 2 May, Xaar was made 10/11 favourite against seventeen opponents over the Rowley Mile course. He appeared to be under pressure at half way, and although he made steady progress he was unable to reach the leaders and finished fourth, just over two lengths behind the winner King of Kings.

Xaar was off the course for more than three months before reappearing in August at Deauville, where he finished second to Kabool in the Prix Guillaume d'Ornano over 2000 metres. He was then matched against older horses and fillies in the Irish Champion Stakes at Leopardstown in September. He finished third of the eight runners behind Swain and Alborada.

=== 1999: four-year-old season ===
Before the start of the 1999 season, Xaar was bought by Sheikh Mohammeds Godolphin Racing organisation and joined the stable of Saeed bin Suroor. After spending the winter in Dubai, the colt was sent to Godolphin's British base at Newmarket. He made his first appearance for his new connections at Royal Ascot, when he ran in the Prince of Wales's Stakes (then a Group Two race) over ten furlongs. Ridden by Frankie Dettori, he finished third of the eight runners behind Lear Spear and Fantastic Light. Dettori employed different tactics in the Eclipse Stakes at Sandown Park in July, as he sent Xaar into the lead from the start. He led the field until 75 yards from the finish, when he was caught by the 20/1 outsider Compton Admiral and finished second by a neck.

== Stud record ==
Xaar was retired to become a breeding stallion for Sheikh Mohammed's Darley Stud in 2001–06 at Darley's Kildangan Stud in Ireland and also Shuttled in 2000–05 to Australia. At stud in 2007 at Haras du Logis in Normandy. At stud in 2008–12 at Darley Japan. He was retired from stud duty and returned to Kildangan Stud, Ireland, in November 2012 and died on 16 May 2021. The most successful of his offspring has been Xtension, twice winner of the Champions Mile at Sha Tin Racecourse in Hong Kong. He is the damsire of Epsom Derby winner Harzand.

== Pedigree ==
Pedigree of Xaar (GB), bay stallion, 1995
Sire Zafonic (USA) 1990	Gone West; 1984	Mr. Prospector	Raise a Native
Sire Zafonic (USA) 1990	Gone West; 1984	Mr. Prospector	Gold Digger
Sire Zafonic (USA) 1990	Gone West; 1984	Secrettame	Secretariat
Sire Zafonic (USA) 1990	Gone West; 1984	Secrettame	Tamerett
Sire Zafonic (USA) 1990	Zaizafon; 1982	The Minstrel	Northern Dancer
Sire Zafonic (USA) 1990	Zaizafon; 1982	The Minstrel	Fleur
Sire Zafonic (USA) 1990	Zaizafon; 1982	Mofida	Right Tack
Sire Zafonic (USA) 1990	Zaizafon; 1982	Mofida	Wold Lass
Dam Monroe (USA) 1977	Sir Ivor; 1965	Sir Gaylord	Turn-To
Dam Monroe (USA) 1977	Sir Ivor; 1965	Sir Gaylord	Somethingroyal
Dam Monroe (USA) 1977	Sir Ivor; 1965	Attica	Mr Trouble
Dam Monroe (USA) 1977	Sir Ivor; 1965	Attica	Athenia
Dam Monroe (USA) 1977	Best In Show; 1965	Traffic Judge	Alibhai
Dam Monroe (USA) 1977	Best In Show; 1965	Traffic Judge	Traffic Court
Dam Monroe (USA) 1977	Best In Show; 1965	Stolen Hour	Mr Busher
Dam Monroe (USA) 1977	Best In Show; 1965	Stolen Hour	Traffic Court (Family: 8-f)

== See also ==
- List of racehorses
