= Xtension =

Irish-bred Hong Kong racehorse

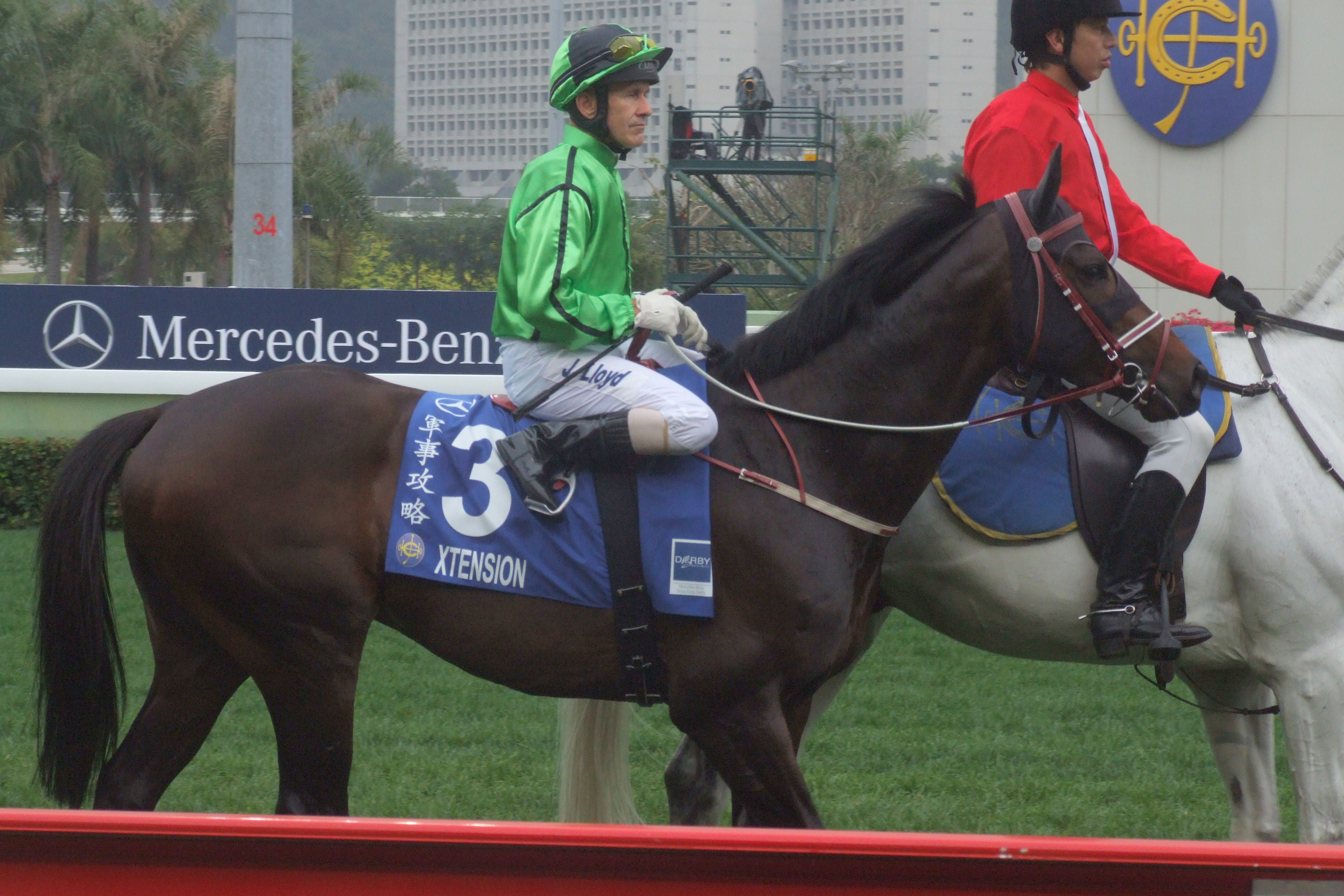
- Xtension
- Sire: Xaar
- Grandsire: Zafonic
- Dam: Great Joy
- Damsire: Grand Lodge
- Sex: Stallion
- Foaled: 2 February 2007
- Country: Ireland
- Colour: Brown
- Breeder: Paul McCartan
- Owner: Brighthelm Racing; Mr & Mrs Steven Lo Kit Sing
- Trainer: Clive Cox; John Moore
- Record: 33: 4-7-5
- Earnings: ₤2,559,219

Major wins
- Vintage Stakes (2009); Champions Mile (2011, 2012)
- Last updated on 14 February 2026

Xtension (Chinese: 軍事攻略; foaled 2 February 2007) is a Hong Kong–based retired racehorse and breeding stallion. He was one of the nominees of 2010-2011 Hong Kong Horse of the Year. He raced for two seasons in the United Kingdom before moving to Hong Kong, racing for four seasons with back to back wins in the Champions Mile and 9 places out of 25 starts.

The back to back Group 1 victories are notable as his only two wins in Hong Kong, beating horses such as Able One, Good Ba Ba, and Ambitious Dragon. His highest ranking on the Longines World's Best Racehorse Rankings was 31st worldwide, with a rating of 120. He retired to stud at Rathbarry Stud.

== Background ==
Xtension is a brown horse with a star and stripe bred in Ireland by Paul McCartan.

He was sired by the British stallion Xaar, named European Champion Two-Year-Old Colt in 1997 and the sire of Balthazaar's Gift and The Cheka. Xtension is his highest earning and highest rated progeny. He is out of the Grand Lodge mare Great Joy, dam of four winners from eight foals to race. Xtension is also her highest earning and highest rated progeny.

He was sold as a yearling at the Tattersalls September Yearling Sale to Clive Cox for 15,000 guineas (worth 15,750 pounds sterling), consigned by Ballyphilip Stud.

== Racing career ==
=== 2008-2009: Two Year Old Season ===
Xtension won his first race in the Casco Maiden Auction Stakes at Goodwood Racecourse over six furlongs, ridden by Adam Kirby. He would then go on to take second behind Canford Cliffs at Ascot before returning to Goodwood to win the Group Two Vintage Stakes ahead of Mata Keranjang and Corporal Maddox. He would then make his next start in the Group 1 Dewhurst Stakes, placing third behind Beethoven and Fencing Master.

=== 2009-2010: Three Year Old Season ===
Xtension would make his debut as a three year old in the Group 1 2000 Guineas Stakes, finishing fourth behind Makfi. He would make his next start in the Group 1 Irish 2000 Guineas Stakes, placing fifth behind Canford Cliffs. He would then contest the Group 1 Prix Jean Prat at Chantilly Racecourse ridden by Gerald Mosse, finishing third behind Dick Turpin and Siyouni. He would make his last European start at Maisons-Laffitte Racecourse in the Group 2 Prix Eugene Adam under Christophe Soumillon, finishing fourth behind Shimraan.

=== 2010-2011: Four Year Old Season ===
Xtension made his Hong Kong debut in the class one Dublin Handicap, finishing fourth behind Multiglory. He then ran a second place in a second class one race before entering the Four-Year-Old Classic Series. He finished second to Lucky Nine in the Hong Kong Classic Mile, fourth after Ambitious Dragon in the Hong Kong Classic Cup, then second again to Ambitious Dragon in the Hong Kong Derby. He ended the season with his first win of the Champions Mile, finishing first ahead of Lucky Nine and Musir.

=== 2011-2012: Five Year Old Season ===
Xtension was winless in his first six starts in Hong Kong before travelling to Meydan to contest the Dubai Duty Free, finishing fifth behind Cityscape. Upon his return to Hong Kong, he won the 2012 running of the Champions Mile, finishing ahead of Glorious Days and Lucky Nine. He then ran a disappointing eleventh in the Premier Cup.

=== 2012-2013: Six Year Old Season ===
Xtension went winless in the season, with his best placing being third in the Hong Kong Gold Cup behind Military Attack and Pure Champion.

=== 2013-2014: Seven Year Old Season ===
Xtension went winless once again in the season, with his highest placing being third in the Jockey Club Mile after Gold-Fun and Helene Spirit.

== Retirement from Racing and Stud Career ==
Xtension retired to Rathbarry Stud in County Cork, Ireland, with an initial stud fee of €5,000 in 2015. He would have his fee dropped to €4,000 for the next two seasons, before being retired from stud.

He would sire fifteen foals to race, with his most successful progeny being Assimilation, with seven wins out of twenty six starts.

== Pedigree ==
Pedigree of Xtension (IRE), brown horse, 2007
Sire Xaar (GB) 1995	Zafonic (USA); 1990	Gone West (USA); 1984	Mr Prospector (USA); 1970
Sire Xaar (GB) 1995	Zafonic (USA); 1990	Gone West (USA); 1984	Secrettame (USA); 1978
Sire Xaar (GB) 1995	Zafonic (USA); 1990	Zaizafon (USA); 1982	The Minstrel (CAN); 1974
Sire Xaar (GB) 1995	Zafonic (USA); 1990	Zaizafon (USA); 1982	Mofida (GB); 1974
Sire Xaar (GB) 1995	Monroe (USA); 1977	Sir Ivor (USA); 1965	Sir Gaylord (USA); 1959
Sire Xaar (GB) 1995	Monroe (USA); 1977	Sir Ivor (USA); 1965	Attica (USA); 1952
Sire Xaar (GB) 1995	Monroe (USA); 1977	Best In Show (USA); 1965	Traffic Judge (USA); 1952
Sire Xaar (GB) 1995	Monroe (USA); 1977	Best In Show (USA); 1965	Stolen Hour (USA); 1953
Dam Great Joy (IRE) 1996	Grand Lodge (USA); 1991	Chief's Crown (USA); 1982	Danzig (USA); 1977
Dam Great Joy (IRE) 1996	Grand Lodge (USA); 1991	Chief's Crown (USA); 1982	Six Crowns (USA); 1976
Dam Great Joy (IRE) 1996	Grand Lodge (USA); 1991	La Papagena (GB); 1983	Habitat (USA); 1966
Dam Great Joy (IRE) 1996	Grand Lodge (USA); 1991	La Papagena (GB); 1983	Magic Flute (IRE); 1968
Dam Great Joy (IRE) 1996	Cheese Soup (USA); 1983	Spectacular Bid (USA); 1976	Bold Bidder (USA); 1962
Dam Great Joy (IRE) 1996	Cheese Soup (USA); 1983	Spectacular Bid (USA); 1976	Spectacular (USA); 1970
Dam Great Joy (IRE) 1996	Cheese Soup (USA); 1983	Avum (USA); 1973	Umbrella Fella (USA); 1962
Dam Great Joy (IRE) 1996	Cheese Soup (USA); 1983	Avum (USA); 1973	Avie (USA); 1963

- Xtension is inbred 4x5 to Sir Gaylord, meaning that he appears once in the fourth generation of his pedigree and once in the fifth.
- Xtension is also 5x5 inbred to both Secretariat and Northern Dancer.
