= Prix Chloé =

- Class: Group 3
- Location: Chantilly Racecourse; Chantilly, France
- Inaugurated: 1921
- Race type: Flat / Thoroughbred
- Website: france-galop.com

Race information
- Distance: 1,800 m (1.1 mi; 8.9 furlongs)
- Surface: Turf
- Track: Right-handed
- Qualification: Three-year-old fillies excluding Group 1 winners
- Weight: 56 kg Penalties; 2 1/2 kg for Group 2 winners 1 1/2 kg for Group 3 winners
- Purse: €80,000 (2016); 1st: €40,000

Prix Chloe
2022
Tariyana	Sippinsoda	Daisy Maisy

Previous years
2021
Noticeable Grace	Rougir	Creative Flair

2020-2011
2019
Suphala	Romanciere	Imperial Charm
2018
Crown Walk	My Sister Nat	Flowrider
2017
Ibiza	Monroe Bay	Dallas Affair
2016
War Flag	Chartreuse	Magnolea
2015
Wekeela	Maimara	Princess Charm
2014
Wunder	Delivery	Be My Gal
2013
Sparkling Beam	Pearlside	Table Ronde
2012
Ridasiyna	Romantica	Rock Me Baby
2011
Beatrice Aurore	Peinture Abstraite	Dream Peace

2010-2001
2010
Lily Of The Valley	Fadela Style	Mahamaya
2009
Wilside	One Clever Cat	Denomination
2008
Goldikova	Top Toss	Proviso
2007
Utrecht	Maria Gabriella	Toque De Queda
2006
Sexy Lady	Grigorieva	Summer's Eve
2005
Needlecraft	Live Life	Fading Light
2004
Love And Bubbles	Cattiva Generosa	Cloon
2003
Acago	Garlinote	Precious Pearl
2002
Walzerkoenigin	Totally Cosmic	Clefairy
2001
Prove	Magic Mission	Zuleika Dobson

2000-1990
2000
Di Moi Oui	Premiere Creation	La Gandilie
1999
Star Of Akkar	Visionnaire	Shabby Chic
1998
Khumba Mela	Insight	Miscast
1997
Golden Arches	Sensitivity	Queen Maud
1996
Khalisa	Ecoute	Housa Dancer
1995
Garden Rose	Take Liberties	Balanka
1994
Adaiyka	Cheyenne Dream	Mrs Arkada
1993
Holly Golightly	Rouquette	Fresher
1992
Formidable Flight	Saratoga Source	Faribole
1991
La Carene	Sha Tha	Gravieres
1990
Gaelic Bird	Vijaya	Star Of The Future

The Prix Chloé is a Group 3 flat horse race in France open to three-year-old thoroughbred fillies. It is run at Chantilly over a distance of 1,800 m (1.1 mi; 8.9 furlongs), and it is scheduled to take place each year in late June or early July.

== History ==
The event was established in 1921 alongside the Prix Daphnis, a similar contest for colts. The two races were named after the characters Daphnis and Chloe from a work by the Greek novelist Longus. The story was popularised in France by the translation of Paul-Louis Courier. Both races were originally held at Le Tremblay, and they usually took place in late April or early May.

The Prix Chloé was initially contested over 1,600 metres. It served as a trial for the Poule d'Essai des Pouliches.

The distance of the race was extended to 1,800 metres in 1961. Le Tremblay closed in 1967, and the event moved to Longchamp the following year. It was transferred to Évry in 1973, and switched to July in 1977.

The Prix Chloé was cut to 1,600 metres in 1993, and reverted to 1,800 metres in 1994. It remained at Évry until 1996. For periods thereafter it was staged at Maisons-Laffitte (1997, 2006–08), Chantilly (1998–2002, 2004–05) and Longchamp (2003). It was run over 1,600 metres in 2008.

The race returned to Chantilly with a length of 1,800 metres in 2009.

== Records ==
Leading jockey (5 wins):

- Olivier Peslier – Khumba Mela (1998), Acago (2003), Goldikova (2008), Wilside (2009), Beatrice Aurore (2011)

Leading trainer (5 wins):

- Roch Filippi – Finetta (1922), Our Gem (1925), Kantara (1929), Furane (1940), Guirlande (1942)

Leading owner (5 wins):

- Marcel Boussac – Astronomie (1935), Canzoni (1939), Caravelle (1943), Djama (1947), Pareo (1952)

== Winners since 1978 ==
Year	Winner	Jockey	Trainer	Owner	Time
1978	Dancing Maid	Freddy Head	Alec Head	Jacques Wertheimer	1:51.3
1979	Producer	Alain Lequeux	Maurice Zilber	Roy Gottlieb
1980	Detroit	Alain Lequeux	Olivier Douieb	Robert Sangster
1981	Kilmona	Yves Saint-Martin	Gérald Sauque	Mrs Léon Givaudan
1982	Grease	Cash Asmussen	François Boutin	Josephine Abercrombie
1983	Verria	Cash Asmussen	François Boutin	Peter Goulandris	1:49.90
1984	Ibadiyya ^{[a]}	Henri Samani	Alain de Royer-Dupré	Aga Khan IV	1:50.30
1985	Korveya	Cash Asmussen	François Boutin	Stavros Niarchos	1:52.90
1986	Fabulous Noble	Cash Asmussen	Jean de Roualle	André Ben Lassin	1:55.00
1987	Swept Away	Dominique Regnard	John Hammond	Sheikh Mohammed	1:54.80
1988	Athyka	Gary W. Moore	Criquette Head	Jacques Wertheimer	1:55.34
1989	Be Exclusive	Dominique Boeuf	André Fabre	J. S. Moss	1:54.21
1990	Gaelic Bird	William Mongil	François Doumen	Michael Smurfit	1:56.92
1991	La Carene	Éric Legrix	Pascal Bary	Ecurie I. M. Fares	1:54.35
1992	Formidable Flight	Éric Legrix	Pascal Bary	Ecurie I. M. Fares	1:52.50
1993 (dh)	Holly Golightly; Rouquette	Tony Cruz; Alain Badel	Richard Hannon Sr. Myriam Bollack-Badel	Victor Behrens; Tullio Attias	1:38.59
1994	Adaiyka	Gérald Mossé	Alain de Royer-Dupré	Aga Khan IV	1:55.53
1995	Garden Rose	Dominique Boeuf	Pascal Bary	Lady O'Reilly	1:54.75
1996	Khalisa	Gérald Mossé	Alain de Royer-Dupré	Aga Khan IV	1:48.06
1997	Golden Arches	Thierry Gillet	Philippe Demercastel	Ecurie Fabien Ouaki	1:53.50
1998	Khumba Mela	Olivier Peslier	André Fabre	Mrs Paul de Moussac	1:56.40
1999	Star of Akkar	Thierry Gillet	Jean-Claude Rouget	Marquesa de Moratalla	1:52.80
2000	Di Moi Oui	Sylvain Guillot	Pascal Bary	Grundy Bloodstock Ltd	1:49.80
2001	Prove	Thierry Thulliez	Maurice Zilber	Khalid Abdullah	1:52.50
2002	Walzerkoenigin	Andreas Suborics	Peter Schiergen	Gestüt Schlenderhan	1:50.20
2003	Acago	Olivier Peslier	Criquette Head-Maarek	Wertheimer et Frère	1:48.10
2004	Love and Bubbles	Ioritz Mendizabal	Robert Collet	Brendan Hayes	1:51.10
2005	Needlecraft	Thierry Jarnet	Henri-Alex Pantall	Sheikh Mohammed	1:49.10
2006	Sexy Lady ^{[b]}	Torsten Mundry	Peter Rau	Gestüt Ittlingen	1:54.70
2007	Utrecht	Stéphane Pasquier	André Fabre	Sheikh Mohammed	1:47.10
2008	Goldikova	Olivier Peslier	Freddy Head	Wertheimer et Frère	1:34.90
2009	Wilside	Olivier Peslier	Mikel Delzangles	Marquesa de Moratalla	1:53.20
2010	Lily of the Valley	Christophe Soumillon	Jean-Claude Rouget	Bernard Barsi	1:51.40
2011	Beatrice Aurore	Olivier Peslier	John Dunlop	Benny Andersson	1:55.53
2012	Ridasiyna	Christophe Lemaire	Mikel Delzangles	Aga Khan IV	1:49.68
2013	Sparkling Beam	Thierry Jarnet	Jonathan Pease	George Strawbridge	1:50.79
2014	Wunder	Adrie de Vries	Markus Klug	Gestut Gorlsdorf	1:51.96
2015	Wekeela	Jean-Bernard Eyquem	Jean-Claude Rouget	Daniel-Yves Treves	1:50.50
2016	War Flag	Christophe Soumillon	Jean-Claude Rouget	Joseph Allen	1:48.68
2017	Ibiza	Stéphane Pasquier	Nicolas Clement	V Timoshenko & A Milovanov	1:52.39
2018	Crown Walk	William Buick	Henri-Alex Pantall	Godolphin SNC	1:52.14
2019	Suphala	Pierre-Charles Boudot	André Fabre	Lady Bamford	1:50.06
2020	Not run due to the COVID-19 pandemic.
2021	Noticeable Grace	Mickael Barzalona	André Fabre	Prince Abdul Rahman al Faisal	1:51.62
2022	Tariyana	Stephane Pasquier	Francis-Henri Graffard	Aga Khan IV	1:48.85
2023	Araminta	Gérald Mossé	Henry Candy	St Albans Bloodstock, Acloque & Frost	1:51.82
2026	Jennifer Jane	Silvestre De Sousa	Charlie Johnston	Russell Trew & Townbraccan	1:49:49

^{a} Reine Mathilde finished first in 1984, but she was placed second after a stewards' inquiry.
^{b} Mandesha was first in 2006, but she was relegated to last place following a stewards' inquiry.

== Earlier winners ==
- 1921: Durete
- 1922: Finetta
- 1923: Anna Bolena
- 1924: Fleet Cloud
- 1925: Our Gem
- 1926: Prosty
- 1927: Bachelette
- 1928: Roahouga
- 1929: Kantara
- 1930: Carinosa
- 1931: Riva Bella
- 1932: White Legend
- 1933: Arpette
- 1934: Mary Tudor
- 1935: Astronomie
- 1936: Blue Bear
- 1937: En Fraude
- 1938: Blue Star
- 1939: Canzoni
- 1940: Furane
- 1941: La Barka
- 1942: Guirlande
- 1943: Caravelle
- 1944: La Belle du Canet
- 1945: Bluette
- 1946: Pastourelle
- 1947: Djama
- 1948: Lutteuse
- 1949: L'Oasis
- 1950: Aglae Grace
- 1951: Stratonice
- 1952: Pareo
- 1953: Providence
- 1954: La Paix
- 1955: Myriade
- 1956: Hillsca
- 1957: Amabelle
- 1958: La Malivoye
- 1959: Iadwiga
- 1960: Diva
- 1961: Belle Shika
- 1962: Marmara
- 1963: Golden Girl
- 1964: Hildegarde
- 1965: Cover Girl
- 1966: Bubunia
- 1967: Modeste
- 1968: Felouque
- 1969: Glaneuse
- 1970: Prime Abord
- 1971: Pistol Packer
- 1972: La Troublerie
- 1973: Servanne
- 1974: Rose Bed
- 1975: Infra Green
- 1976: Rose of Stanbul
- 1977: Lillan

== See also ==
- List of French flat horse races
