= Goldikova =

Irish-bred Thoroughbred racehorse (2005–2021)

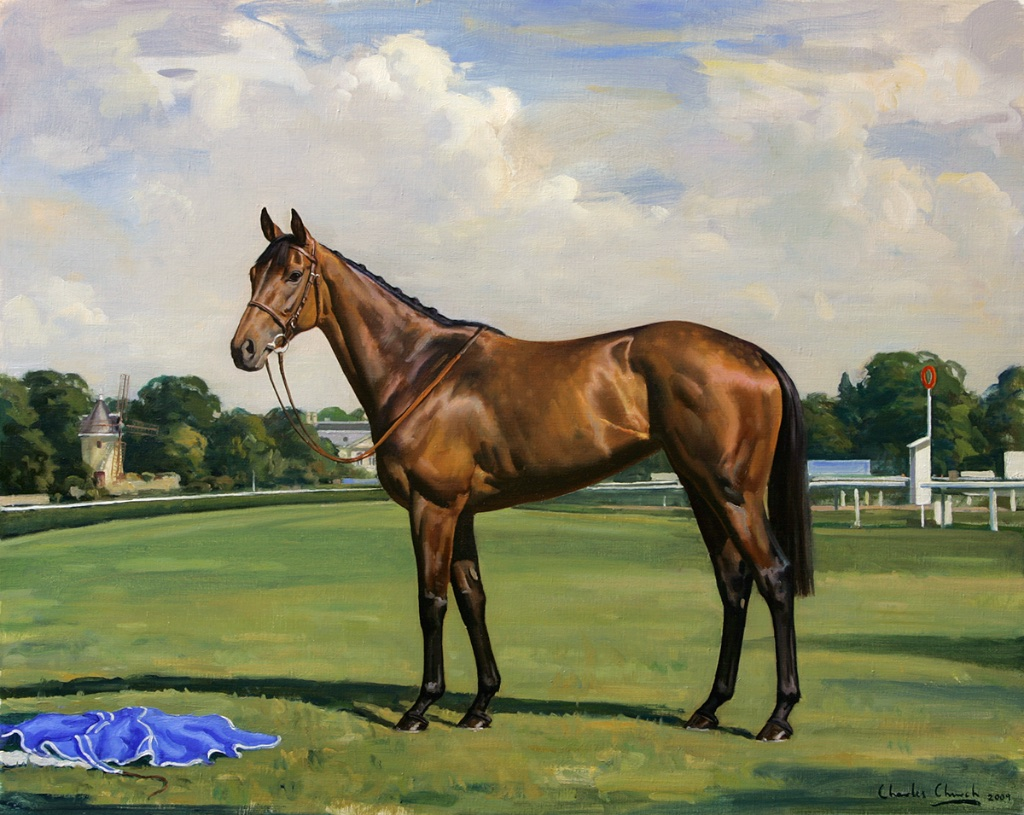
- Goldikova, by Dorset-based equine artist Charles Church
- Sire: Anabaa (US)
- Grandsire: Danzig
- Dam: Born Gold (US)
- Damsire: Blushing Groom
- Sex: Mare
- Foaled: 15 March 2005
- Died: 5 January 2021 (aged 15)
- Country: Ireland
- Colour: Bay
- Breeder: Wertheimer et Frère
- Owner: Wertheimer et Frère
- Trainer: Freddy Head
- Record: 27: 17–6–3
- Earnings: €5,201,564 ($7,176,551)

Major wins
- Prix Chloé (2008); Prix Rothschild (2008, 2009, 2010, 2011); Prix du Moulin (2008); Falmouth Stakes (2009); Prix Jacques Le Marois (2009); Prix d'Ispahan (2010, 2011); Queen Anne Stakes (2010); Prix de la Forêt (2010) Breeders' Cup wins: Breeders' Cup Mile (2008, 2009, 2010)

Awards
- European Horse of the year (2010); European Champion Older Horse (2009, 2010); American Champion Female Turf Horse (2009, 2010); Timeform rating: 133

Honours
- United States Racing Hall of Fame inductee (2017); British Champions Series Hall of Fame (2024); French Horse Racing Hall of Fame (2025)
- Last updated on 26 September 2024

Goldikova (15 March 2005 – 5 January 2021) was an Irish-bred, French-trained Thoroughbred racehorse who was the 2010 European Horse of the Year. A filly, Goldikova won a total of 14 Group One races in her home country, Great Britain and the United States, with nine victories over male horses. She is the only European-trained horse to have won more than ten Group One races. Trained by Freddy Head, Goldikova is the only horse to have won three (2008, 2009, 2010) Breeders' Cup Mile races. She was ridden by Olivier Peslier in all of her races.

== Background ==
Goldikova was bred by Alain and Gérard Wertheimer and sired by July Cup winner Anabaa. Her dam, Born Gold, is also the dam of Prix Vermeille winner Galikova, who was sired by champion sire Galileo.

Goldikova was put into training with Freddy Head, former six-times Champion Jockey in France.

== Racing career ==
=== 2007: two-year-old season ===
Goldikova won both of her starts at age two, capturing the Prix de Toutevoie and the Prix de la Lorie at Chantilly Racecourse.

=== 2008: three-year-old season ===
At age three, Goldikova began the 2008 season in April, running monthly thereafter. She started with two seconds and a third and loss to Zarkava (in the Poule d'Essai des Pouliches and the Prix de Diane), then had three consecutive wins. The first one came in the Prix Chloé, followed by the Prix Rothschild, in which she defeated both the French Classic winner, Darjina, and the British Classic winner, Natagora.

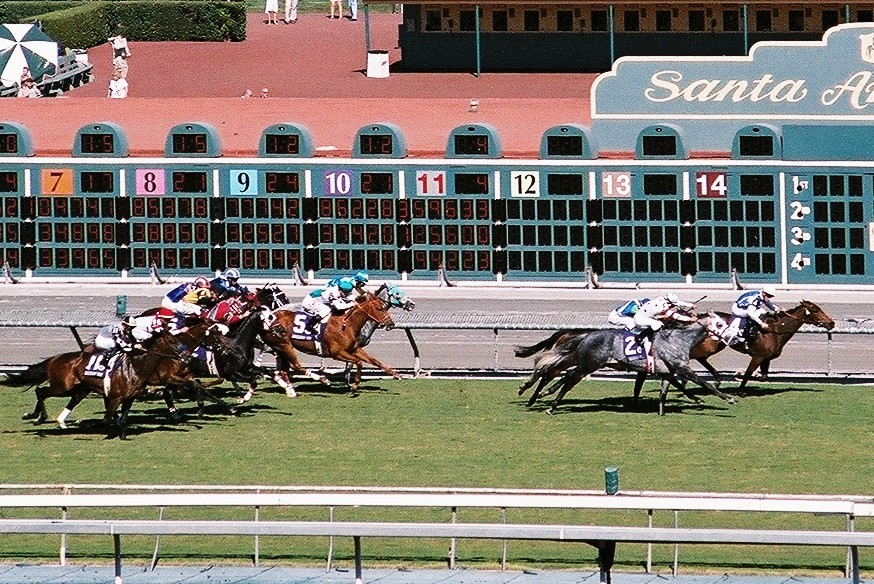
Goldikova winning the Breeders' Cup Mile

Goldikova's third straight victory of the year came in September at Longchamp Racecourse in the Group One Prix du Moulin in which she defeated Darjina and Natagora again as well as top Irish colt Henrythenavigator. She again defeated the males in winning the 2008 Breeders' Cup Mile at Santa Anita Park in California and was a finalist for the Eclipse Award's American Champion Female Turf Horse for 2008.

=== 2009: four-year-old season ===
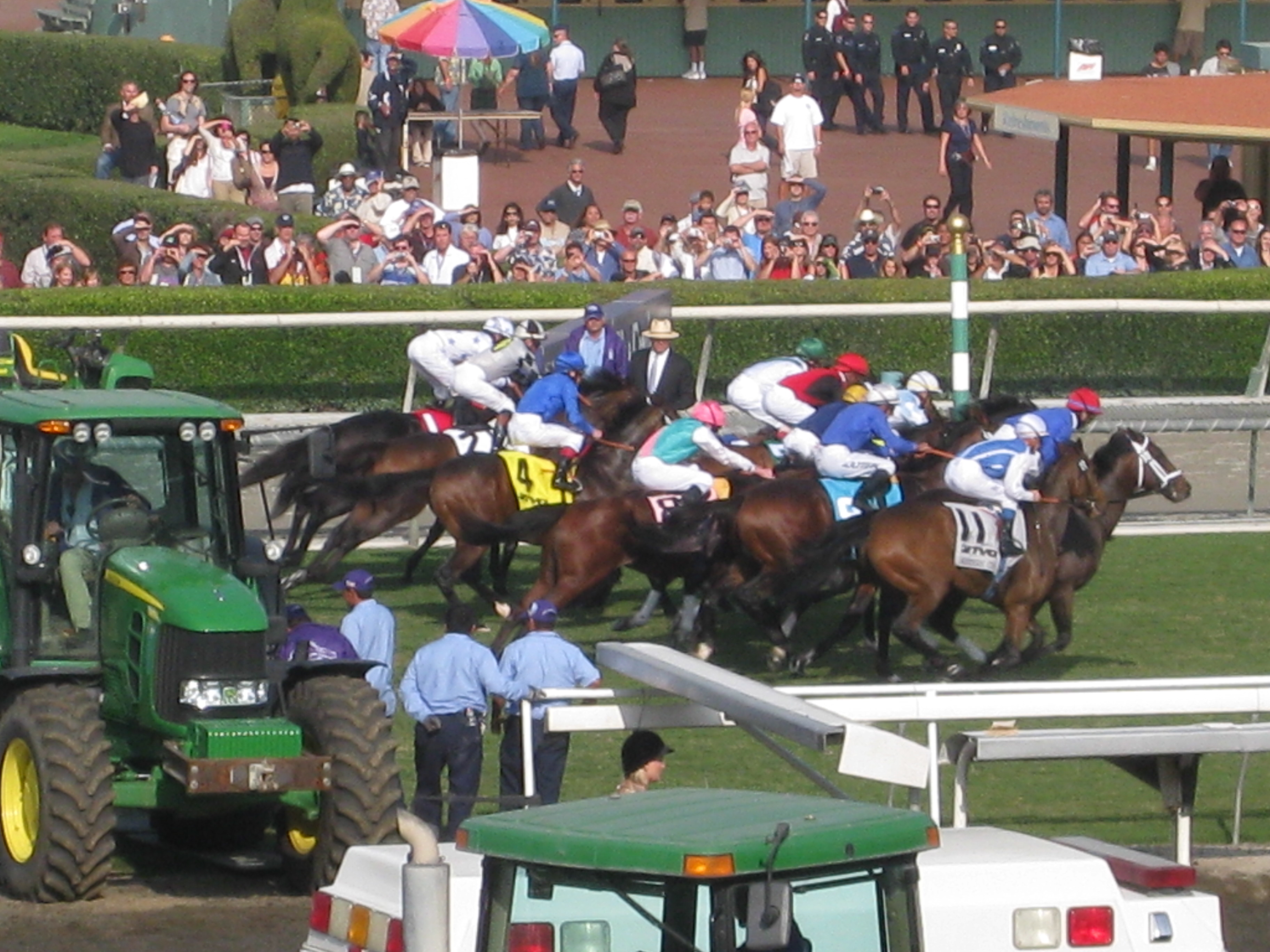
Goldikova (#11) at the start of the 2009 Mile

Racing at age four, Goldikova made her first start in May's Prix d'Ispahan, finishing seventh on a soft course. In July, she won England's Falmouth Stakes at Newmarket Racecourse. On 2 August, she won her second consecutive Prix Rothschild at Deauville-La Touques Racecourse. At the same Deauville course on 16 August, Goldikova won her sixth group one race, easily defeating her male counterparts in the Prix Jacques Le Marois at Deauville-La Touques Racecourse. Goldikova then returned to Santa Anita Park to win her second Breeders' Cup Mile, with a different racing style. She was second last for much of the race and at the top of the stretch went five horses wide. Then she changed leads again and surged past Courageous Cat to win in 1:32.26.

=== 2010: five-year-old season ===
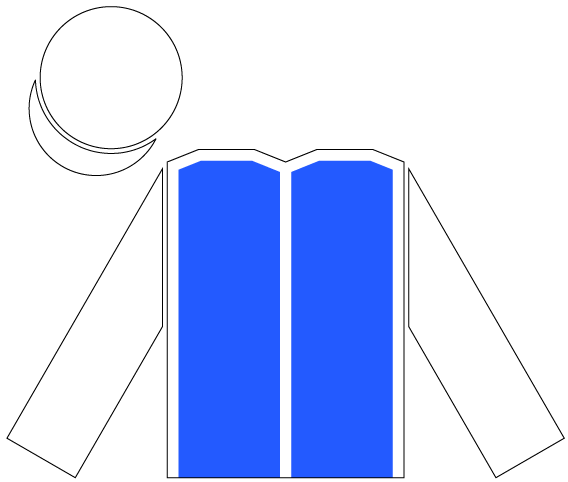
Racing silks of the Wertheimer family

Following her 2009 Breeders' Cup win at Santa Anita Park, Goldikova was rested at the Head family's Haras du Quesnay in Normandy until mid-February, when she was put back in training at Freddy Head's base at Chantilly Racecourse. On 23 May, she won her 2010 debut at Longchamp in the Prix d'Ispahan, completing the 1,850 metres (1.15 miles) in 1:49.4 while holding off Byword (who subsequently won the Prince of Wales's Stakes at Royal Ascot) and setting a new stakes record in the process.

In her second start of 2010, on 15 June, Goldikova won the Queen Anne Stakes at Royal Ascot, defeating the 2009 winner Paco Boy by a neck in 1:37.74, taking 0.5 seconds off of the stakes record. It was her ninth Group One victory and sixth against males. On 1 August, Goldikova competed a three-peat of wins in the Prix Rothschild. After she settled in third throughout the race, Oliver Peslier barely had to ask an effort of her before she raced away from the rest of the field. On 15 August in the Prix Jacques Le Marois, two weeks after the Prix Rothschild win, Goldikova suffered her first defeat of the year, second to Makfi. Her connections believed that it was largely because of the very soft ground, which she has shown her extreme dislike for in the past. However, she beat Paco Boy again for the second time.

On 3 October, Goldikova made her final start before the Breeders' Cup Mile, defeating a field of 16 males in the Prix de la Forêt at Longchamp, including Dick Turpin, Paco Boy and 1,000 Guineas winner Special Duty. By winning, she broke the record set by Miesque for the most Group/Grade One wins ever by a European mare.

She made history on 6 November 2010 when she became the first horse to win a Breeders' Cup race three times by winning the Breeders' Cup Mile at Churchill Downs, defeating Champion Turf Horse Gio Ponti by 1 3/4 lengths. On 16 November Goldikova was awarded with two Cartier Racing Awards, Horse of the Year and Champion Older Horse. She became the only horse to win the Champion Older Horse award twice.

=== 2011: six-year-old season ===
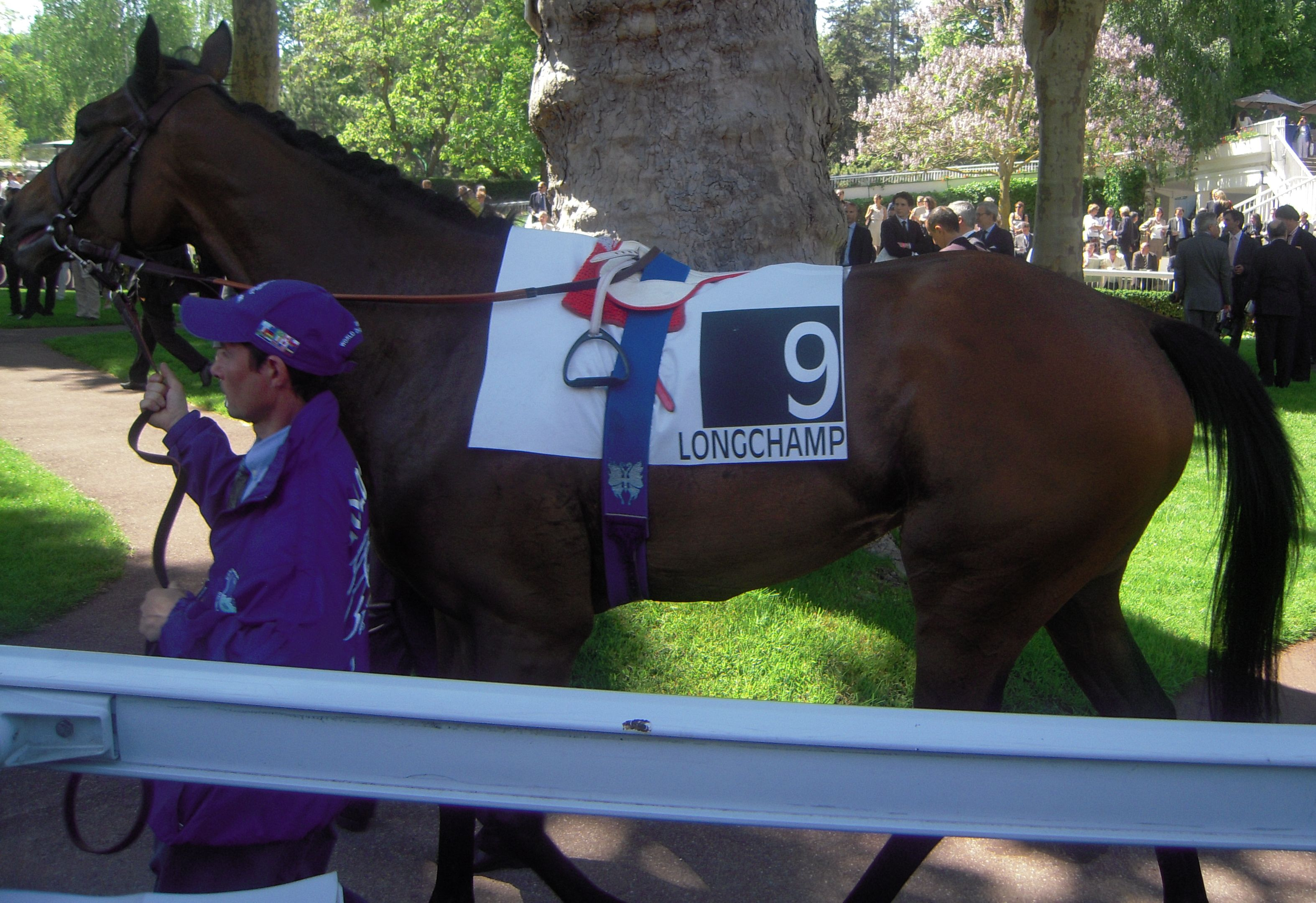
Goldikova in the pre-race paddock

Goldikova made her six-year-old debut on 22 May by winning the Prix d'Ispahan for the second time, beating Champion Stakes winner Cirrus des Aigles.

On 14 June Goldikova finished second by ¾ length to Canford Cliffs in the Queen Anne Stakes. Jockey Olivier Peslier was fined for being two pounds overweight when he weighed in. Goldikova won her 14th Group One, a European record, when winning her fourth consecutive Prix Rothschild at Deauville. On 15 August, Goldikova attempted to extend her top-level wins to 15 in the Prix Jacques Le Marois at Deauville, France. She did not take to the soft ground, which was the case for this year's Prix Jacques Le Marois. Goldikova ran second, beaten a length, to Group One winner Immortal Verse.

Goldikova prepped for the Breeders' Cup Mile in the Group One Prix de la Forêt on the Prix de l'Arc de Triomphe undercard at Longchamp. She was beaten a head by five time Group One winner Dream Ahead. This was Goldikova's final race in France before she headed to her career finale in the US. On 4 November 2011, Goldikova finished third in the Breeders' Cup Mile, one length behind longshot Court Vision, who edged out Turallure by a nose. Goldikova was attempting to win an unprecedented fourth straight Breeders' Cup Mile. The final time was 1:37.05 over good ground.

== Assessment and honours ==
Goldikova was officially rated the joint 6th best horse in the world in 2008 on a rating of 125. The only filly rated higher than her was Prix de l'Arc de Triomphe winner Zarkava. In 2009, with a rating of 130, she was rated the second best horse in the world, behind only 2000 Guineas, Epsom Derby and Prix de l'Arc de Triomphe winner Sea the Stars. Goldikova achieved a rating of 125 in 2010, the joint 11th best in the world and the top rated mare. At the end of the 2011 season she was officially rated as the joint 14th best horse in the world and the 3rd best filly or mare on a rating of 124.

In 2017, Goldikova was inducted into the American Museum of Racing and Hall of Fame.

== Retirement ==
Goldikova was retired from racing immediately after her third-place finish in the Breeders' Cup Mile. In early 2012, she was covered by champion sire Galileo at Coolmore Stud in Ireland. On Sunday 3 February 2013, Goldikova gave birth to her first foal, a colt. She returned to Galileo for the 2013 covering season. Goldikova died on 5 January 2021.

Foaling record

2013 Goldikovic (IRE), bay colt, foaled 3 February, by Galileo (IRE) – unraced to date (9/11/16)

2014 Terrakova (IRE), bay filly, foaled 4 February, by Galileo (IRE) – winner of Prix Cléopâtre (Gr. 3) and 3rd Prix de Diane (French Oaks, Gr. 1).

2016 Filly by Intello (GER)

== Pedigree ==
Pedigree of Goldikova, bay mare, 2005
Sire Anabaa (US) 1992	Danzig	Northern Dancer	Nearctic
Sire Anabaa (US) 1992	Danzig	Northern Dancer	Natalma
Sire Anabaa (US) 1992	Danzig	Pas De Nom	Admiral's Voyage
Sire Anabaa (US) 1992	Danzig	Pas De Nom	Petitioner
Sire Anabaa (US) 1992	Balbonella	Gay Mecene	Vaguely Noble
Sire Anabaa (US) 1992	Balbonella	Gay Mecene	Gay Missile
Sire Anabaa (US) 1992	Balbonella	Bamieres	Riverman
Sire Anabaa (US) 1992	Balbonella	Bamieres	Bergamasque
Dam Born Gold (US) 1991	Blushing Groom	Red God	Nasrullah
Dam Born Gold (US) 1991	Blushing Groom	Red God	Spring Run
Dam Born Gold (US) 1991	Blushing Groom	Runaway Bride	Wild Risk
Dam Born Gold (US) 1991	Blushing Groom	Runaway Bride	Aimee
Dam Born Gold (US) 1991	Riviere d'Or	Lyphard	Northern Dancer
Dam Born Gold (US) 1991	Riviere d'Or	Lyphard	Goofed
Dam Born Gold (US) 1991	Riviere d'Or	Gold River	Riverman
Dam Born Gold (US) 1991	Riviere d'Or	Gold River	Glaneuse

== See also ==
- List of leading Thoroughbred racehorses
- Repeat winners of horse races
