= Musir =

Australian-bred Thoroughbred racehorse

- Sire: Redoute's Choice
- Grandsire: Danehill
- Dam: Dizzy de Lago
- Damsire: Encosta De Lago
- Sex: Colt
- Foaled: 2006
- Country: Australia
- Colour: Bay
- Owner: Mohammed bin Khalifa Al Maktoum
- Trainer: Mike de Kock
- Record: 19: 8-4-3
- Earnings: £1,552,186

Major wins
- UAE 2000 Guineas (2010); UAE Derby (2010); International Topkapi Trophy (2011); Al Maktoum Challenge, Round 1 (2012); Al Rashidiya (2012)

Musir (foaled 2007) is an Australian-bred racehorse.

== Background ==
Musir was sired by Redoute's Choice out of Dizzy de Lago a daughter of Encosta De Lago. He was trained by Mike de Kock (SA) and was owned by Mohammed bin Khalifa Al Maktoum

== Racing career ==
Musir was a Group 1 winner in South Africa as two-year-old. In 2010 he won the UAE 2000 Guineas and the UAE Derby.
