= Sandown Mile =

Flat horse race in Britain

Sandown Mile (Bet365 Mile)
- Class: Group 2
- Location: Sandown Park; Esher, England
- Inaugurated: 1985
- Race type: Flat / Thoroughbred
- Sponsor: Bet365
- Website: Sandown Park

Race information
- Distance: 1m (1,609 metres)
- Surface: Turf
- Track: Right-handed
- Qualification: Four-years-old and up
- Weight: 9 st 3 lb Allowances; 3 lb for fillies and mares Penalties; 5 lb for Group 1 winners * 3 lb for Group 2 winners * * since 31 August last year
- Purse: £125,000 (2024); 1st: £70,888

Sandown Mile
2026
Opera Ballo	Field Of Gold	Zeus Olympios

Previous years
2025
Dancing Gemini	Tamfana	Cicero's Gift
2024
Charyn	Poker Face	Lord North
2023
Mutasaabeq	Native Trail	Light Infantry
2022
Lights On	Mutasaabeq	Alcohol Free
2021
Palace Pier	Bless Him	Happy Power

2020-2011
2019
Beat The Bank	Sharja Bridge	Regal Reality
2018
Addeybb	Stormy Antarctic	Aljazzi
2017
Sovereign Debt	Gabrial	Jallota
2016
Toormore	Dutch Connection	Breton Rock
2015
Custom Cut	Here Comes When	Shifting Power
2014
Tullius	Montiridge	Penitent
2013
Trumpet Major	Highland Knight	Chil The Kite
2012
Penitent	Questioning	Famous Name
2011
Dick Turpin	Cityscape	Dream Eater

2010-2001
2010
Paco Boy	Pressing	The Cheka
2009
Paco Boy	Dream Eater	Virtual
2008
Major Cadeaux	Rob Roy	Metropolitan Man
2007
Jeremy	Bahia Breeze	Take A Bow
2006
Rob Roy	Babodana	Kings Point
2005
Hurricane Alan	Brunel	Babodana
2004
Hurricane Alan	Gateman	Soviet Song
2003
Desert Deer	Smirk	Reel Buddy
2002
Swallow Flight	Cape Town	Premier Prize
2001
Nicobar	Swallow Flight	Island Sands

2000-1991
2000
Indian Lodge	Trans Island	Almushtarak
1999
Handsome Ridge	On The Ridge	Almushtarak
1998
Almushtarak	Crystal Hearted	Handsome Ridge
1997
Wixim	First Island	Bin Rosie
1996
Gabr	Soviet Line	Mistle Cat
1995
Missed Flight	Ridgewood Ben	Mutakddim
1994
Penny Drops	Alflora	Gabr
1993
Alhijaz	Hazaam	Zaahi
1992
Rudimentary	Zoman	Desert Sun
1991
In The Groove	Zoman	Aldbourne

1990-1985
1990
Markofdistinction	Citidancer	Magic Gleam
1989
Reprimand	French Stress	Most Welcome
1988
Soviet Star	Shady Heights	Ascot Knight
1987
Vertige	Teleprompter	Hadeer
1986
Field Hand	Scottish Reel	Protection
1985
Pebbles	Vacarme	Sarab

The Sandown Mile is a Group 2 flat horse race in Great Britain open to horses aged four years or older. It is run over a distance of 1 mile (1,609 metres) at Sandown Park in late April.

== History ==
The event was established in 1985, and it was initially sponsored by Trusthouse Forte. The first running was won by Pebbles.

Subsequent sponsors of the race have included KLM uk, At the Races and Betfred. The online gambling company Bet365 became the sponsor in 2008, and the event is currently known as the Bet365 Mile.

The Sandown Mile is staged during a two-day meeting which features both flat and jump races. Other events at the meeting include the Bet365 Gold Cup, the Celebration Chase, the Gordon Richards Stakes and the Sandown Classic Trial.

== Records ==
Most successful horse (2 wins):

- Hurricane Alan – 2004, 2005
- Paco Boy – 2009, 2010

Leading owner (3 wins):

- Sheikh Mohammed - Pebbles (1985), Soviet Star (1988), Reprimand (1989)

Leading jockey (5 wins):

- Richard Hughes – Major Cadeaux (2008), Paco Boy (2009, 2010), Dick Turpin (2011), Trumpet Major (2013)

Leading trainer (7 wins):

- Richard Hannon Sr. – Hurricane Alan (2004, 2005), Major Cadeaux (2008), Paco Boy (2009, 2010), Dick Turpin (2011), Trumpet Major (2013)

== Winners ==
Year	Winner	Age	Jockey	Trainer	Owner	Time
1985	Pebbles	4	Steve Cauthen	Clive Brittain	Sheikh Mohammed	1:42.04
1986	Field Hand	4	Brent Thomson	Barry Hills	Robert Sangster	1:51.71
1987	Vertige	5	Tony Cruz	Patrick Biancone	Daniel Wildenstein	1:40.51
1988	Soviet Star	4	Cash Asmussen	André Fabre	Sheikh Mohammed	1:45.23
1989	Reprimand	4	Steve Cauthen	Henry Cecil	Sheikh Mohammed	1:49.20
1990	Markofdistinction	4	Frankie Dettori	Luca Cumani	Gerald Leigh	1:39.50
1991	In the Groove	4	Steve Cauthen	David Elsworth	Brian Cooper	1:42.45
1992	Rudimentary	4	Steve Cauthen	Henry Cecil	Exors of Lord Howard de Walden	1:42.09
1993	Alhijaz	4	Willie Carson	John Dunlop	Prince A A Faisal	1:43.08
1994	Penny Drops	5	David Harrison	Lord Huntingdon	Stanley J Sharp	1:46.89
1995	Missed Flight	5	George Duffield	Chris Wall	Walter Grubmuller	1:41.09
1996	Gabr	6	Willie Carson	Robert Armstrong	Hamdan Al Maktoum	1:41.34
1997	Wixim	4	Pat Eddery	Roger Charlton	Khalid Abdullah	1:43.90
1998	Almushtarak	5	Ray Cochrane	Kamil Mahdi	Hamad Al-Mutuwa	1:51.12
1999	Handsome Ridge	5	Frankie Dettori	John Gosden	Platt Promotions Ltd	1:47.85
2000	Indian Lodge	4	Michael Kinane	Amanda Perrett	Seymour Cohn	1:50.69
2001	Nicobar	4	Kieren Fallon	Ian Balding	Robert Hitchins	1:49.61
2002	Swallow Flight	6	Darryll Holland	Geoff Wragg	Mollers Racing	1:45.13
2003	Desert Deer	5	Kevin Darley	Mark Johnston	Jaber Abdullah	1:42.67
2004	Hurricane Alan	4	Pat Dobbs	Richard Hannon Sr.	I A N Wright	1:43.67
2005	Hurricane Alan	5	Pat Dobbs	Richard Hannon Sr.	I A N Wright	1:43.68
2006	Rob Roy	4	Michael Kinane	Sir Michael Stoute	Philip Newton	1:41.98
2007	Jeremy	4	Frankie Dettori	Sir Michael Stoute	Elizabeth Moran	1:41.22
2008	Major Cadeaux	4	Richard Hughes	Richard Hannon Sr.	Woodcock / Pickford / Mort	1:43.23
2009	Paco Boy	4	Richard Hughes	Richard Hannon Sr.	Calvera Partnership No 2	1:43.04
2010	Paco Boy	5	Richard Hughes	Richard Hannon Sr.	Calvera Partnership No 2	1:41.65
2011	Dick Turpin	4	Richard Hughes	Richard Hannon Sr.	John Manley	1:41.92
2012	Penitent	6	Daniel Tudhope	David O'Meara	Middleham Park Racing XVII	1:52.58
2013	Trumpet Major	4	Richard Hughes	Richard Hannon Sr.	John Manley	1:45.34
2014	Tullius	6	Jimmy Fortune	Andrew Balding	Kennet Valley Thoroughbreds VI	1:48.10
2015	Custom Cut	6	Daniel Tudhope	David O'Meara	Gary Douglas & Pat Breslin	1:44.57
2016	Toormore	5	William Buick	Richard Hannon Jr.	Godolphin	1:43.06
2017	Sovereign Debt	8	James Sullivan	Ruth Carr	Lady O'Reilly & Partners	1:44.24
2018	Addeybb	4	James Doyle	William Haggas	Ahmed Al Maktoum	1:45.48
2019	Beat The Bank	5	Silvestre de Sousa	Andrew Balding	King Power Racing Co Ltd	1:43.23
	no race 2020 (Note: The 2020 running was cancelled because of the COVID-19 pandemic in the United Kingdom)
2021	Palace Pier	4	Frankie Dettori	John & Thady Gosden	Hamdan bin Mohammed Al Maktoum	1:44.43
2022	Lights On	5	Ryan Moore	Sir Michael Stoute	Cheveley Park Stud	1:45.63
2023 (Note: The 2023 race took place at Newmarket, after the original Sandown Park meeting was abandoned due to unsafe ground)	Mutasaabeq	5	Jim Crowley	Charles Hills	Shadwell Estate Company Ltd	1:37.18
2024	Charyn	4	Silvestre de Sousa	Roger Varian	Nurlan Bizakov	1:45.17
2025	Dancing Gemini	4	Rossa Ryan	Roger Teal	Fishdance Limited	1:43.53
2026	Opera Ballo	4	William Buick	Charlie Appleby	Godolphin	1:42.26

== See also ==
- Horse racing in Great Britain
- List of British flat horse races
