= Paco Boy =

Irish-bred Thoroughbred racehorse

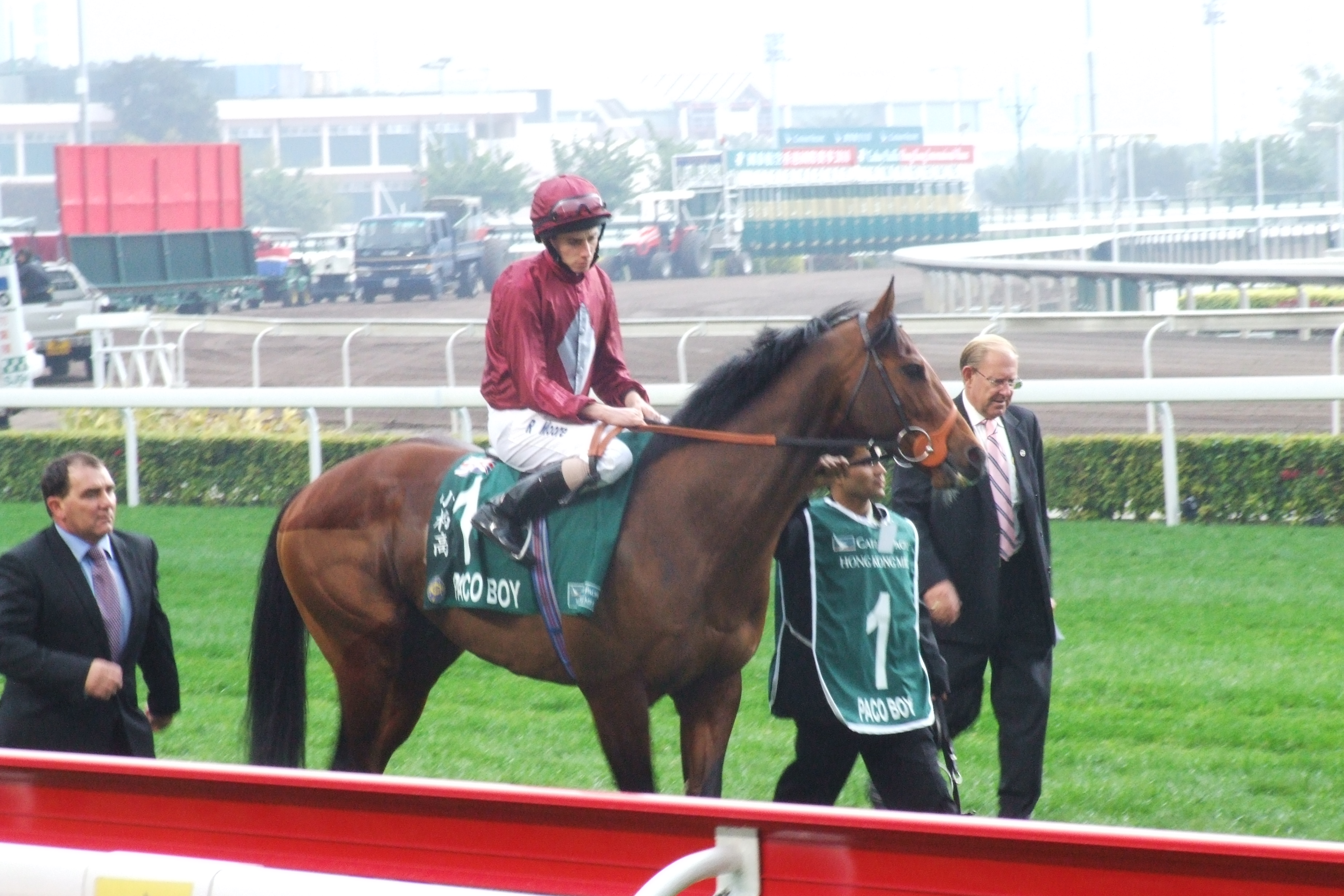
- Sire: Desert Style
- Grandsire: Green Desert
- Dam: Tappen Zee
- Damsire: Sandhurst Prince
- Sex: Stallion
- Foaled: 24 March 2005
- Country: Ireland
- Colour: Bay
- Breeder: Joan Browne
- Owner: The Calvera Partnership
- Trainer: Richard Hannon Sr.
- Record: 24: 11-3-2
- Earnings: £1,078,287

Major wins
- Spring Cup (2008); Greenham Stakes (2008); Betfair Cup (2008); Hungerford Stakes (2008); Prix de la Forêt (2008); Sandown Mile (2009, 2010); Queen Anne Stakes (2009); Lockinge Stakes (2010)

Paco Boy (foaled 24 March 2005) is a retired Irish thoroughbred racehorse who was trained by Richard Hannon Sr. He won three Group 1 races including Prix de la Forêt, Queen Anne Stakes and Lockinge Stakes. Paco Boy was known as a hold up horse, usually coming from behind with a devastating turn of foot.

== Background ==
Paco Boy was bred by Joan Browne, and was sired by Desert Style, a Group 3 winning sprinter and son of outstanding sire Green Desert, out of the mare Tappen Zee. Paco Boy is a bay with a distinctive white stripe on his face.

Paco Boy was sold as a yearling for 30,000 guineas and bought by the Calvera Partnership and put into training with Richard Hannon Sr. He was described as "an old favourite" by his trainer due in part to his high-class ability in spite of his relatively cheap price; "He cost nothing, he's come through the ranks and every time he comes to the races he's brilliant," said Hannon after riding him to victory in the Lockinge Stakes at Newbury in 2010.

== Career ==
=== Two-year-old season ===
Paco Boy made his debut on 5 September 2007, finishing third in a six furlong maiden race on the all-weather at Kempton. He won his next race on the grass at Newbury, winning by two and a half lengths as the 2/1 favourite. He finished off his season with a win in a conditions race at Newmarket, beating the favourite Wid by three-quarters of a length.

=== Three-year-old season ===
Paco Boy made his season debut in the Listed Spring Cup over seven furlongs at Lingfield. Held up at the back of the field, he made rapid progress in the final fifty yards before winning by nearly two lengths. He next ran in the Group 3 Greenham Stakes at Newbury, a recognised trial for the 2000 Guineas at Newmarket. Held up in his now customary style, he won by three-quarters of a length, with the favourite Confront back in fifth.

Paco Boy next entered the Group 2 Betfair Cup over seven furlongs at Glorious Goodwood. Ridden more forwardly, he led inside the final furlong and, despite edging left, held on to win by a neck from Stimulation. The Group 2 Hungerford Stakes over the same distance at Newbury was the next target, and Paco Boy registered a victory by four and a half lengths as the 6/4 favourite.

With this win, Paco Boy stepped up in class for the Group 1 Prix du Moulin over a mile at Longchamp. He faced an extremely strong field with dual 2000 Guineas winner Henrythenavigator, 1000 Guineas winner Natagora, 2007 French 1000 Guineas winner Darjina, and Prix Rothschild winner (and future Horse of the Year) Goldikova. Paco Boy finished third behind Goldikova and Darjina but was disqualified after the banned substance salnuterol was found in his system.

He next won the Group 1 Prix de la Forêt over seven furlongs on the Arc undercard at Longchamp, where he beat Natagora by three lengths.

=== Four-year-old season ===
Paco Boy made his debut as an older horse in the Group 1 Dubai Duty Free over nine furlongs in Dubai in March. Held up at the rear of the field, he made little progress and finished eighth behind runaway winner Gladiatorus. Returning to Britain, Paco Boy ran in the Group 2 Sandown Mile in April, where he registered a three-quarters of a length win over Dream Eater. This race served as a prep for the Group 1 Lockinge Stakes at Newbury in May. Sent off the 11/8 favourite against a field that included Twice Over and Dream Eater, Paco Boy came with a strong challenge but faded in the final furlong to finish fourth behind Virtual. The Hannons felt that he had run below form, and it afterwards transpired that he was suffering from a broken navicular bone in the hoof that also affected him in the Sussex stakes group 1 where he finished second, beaten 2 1/2 lengths by Rip van winkle.

In Paco Boy's next race he had another crack at winning a Group 1 over a mile in the Queen Anne Stakes, the opening race of Royal Ascot in June. Although his Dubai conqueror Gladiatorus was sent off favourite, Paco Boy won by a length and a half from Ascot specialist Cesare, despite running across the track in the final furlong. Hannon said afterwards, "I think it's put a few old jokers to bed. If he didn't stay a mile he stayed it better than the others anyway." Due to his swift turn of foot, the Hannons decided to bring Paco Boy back in trip and run him in the July Cup over six furlongs at Newmarket. Sent off at 9/2, Paco Boy was held up and outpaced by the specialist sprinters before running on strongly to finish fourth behind Cartier Champion Sprinter, Fleeting Spirit. Back at a mile, Paco Boy's next target was the Group 1 Sussex Stakes at Goodwood, where he faced two outstanding horses from the Classic generation: 1000 Guineas and Coronation Stakes winner Ghanaati, and the Aidan O'Brien-trained Rip Van Winkle, who had recently finished second behind Sea the Stars in the Eclipse Stakes. Sent off the third favourite at 7/2, Paco Boy finished second to Rip Van Winkle, who triumphed by two and a half lengths.

The Sussex Stakes was Paco Boy's final run in 2009 and he was rested for the following season.

=== Five-year-old season ===
Paco Boy did not run in Dubai in 2010, and instead reappeared in the Sandown Mile, which he won for the second time by over three lengths from Group 1 winner Pressing. He then attempted to make amends for the previous year and win the Lockinge Stakes, which he did in extremely impressive style; coming to challenge on the bridle before quickening to lead in the final furlong. After the Lockinge, he was made favourite for the Queen Anne Stakes at Royal Ascot.

The race at Ascot featured a highly anticipated clash between dual Breeders Cup Mile winner Goldikova and Rip Van Winkle, who had also won the Queen Elizabeth II Stakes. Goldikova was sent off the favourite and duly prevailed by a neck from Paco Boy, who was gaining on the mare throughout the final furlong but could not get past before the line. He faced Goldikova again in the Group 1 Prix Jacques Le Marois at Deauville, but both older horses were beaten by the 2000 Guineas winner Makfi, who relished the soft ground to beat Goldikova by two and a half lengths, with Paco Boy a neck behind in third.

Paco Boy attempted to get back to winning ways in the Group 1 Prix du Moulin, but was blocked half a furlong from home before running on again to finish fourth to upset winner Fuisse. Paco Boy clashed with Goldikova for a third time in the Prix de la Forêt, but again the mare was too good and recorded a record breaking eleventh Group 1 victory, with Paco Boy half of a length behind her in second. Paco Boy faced Goldikova for the fourth and final time in the Breeders Cup Mile at Churchill Downs in the United States, where the mare was attempting to win a record third Breeders Cup race. Held up near the back of the field as usual, Paco Boy ran on late down the straight to finish fourth behind Goldikova, who won comfortably.

Paco Boy was sold to Highclere Stud and Waikato Stud after his fourth-placed finish in Kentucky, and his previous owners believed that he would not race again. However, his new owners decided to run him one last time in the Group 1 Hong Kong Mile at Sha Tin where, despite being sent off the 2/1 favourite, he ran very poorly and finished last in a field of thirteen. His connections suggested that the long season and hard races had caught up with him and he was retired to stud.

== Assessment ==
Trainer Richard Hannon described Paco Boy as "a horse with everything. He's got a cruising speed and then, when you get him into the race, he's got a turn of foot, which is what shows how good he is."

He earned a Timeform rating of 128, and an official rating of 124, making him the joint 14th best horse in the world in 2010.

== Retirement ==
Paco Boy is standing at Highclere Stud for £8,000, and Waikato Stud for $12,500. His first crop made their racecourse debuts in 2014. His second crop son Galileo Gold won the 2000 Guineas in 2016.
