= Lily of the Valley (horse) =

French-bred Thoroughbred racehorse

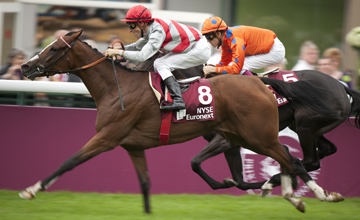
- Lily Of The Valley
- Sire: Galileo
- Grandsire: Sadler's Wells
- Dam: Pennegale
- Damsire: Pennekamp
- Sex: Mare
- Foaled: 2 February 2007
- Country: France
- Owner: Bernard Barsi
- Trainer: Jean-Claude Rouget
- Record: 11: 6-0-1
- Earnings: £303,976

Major wins
- Prix Volterra (2010); Prix Chloé (2010); Prix de la Nonette (2010); Prix de l'Opéra (2010)

Lily of the Valley (foaled 2 February 2007) is a French retired Thoroughbred racehorse who won the Prix de l'Opéra in 2010.

== Background ==
Lily of the Valley was bred in France by Dunmore Stud, Ltd. She is owned by Bernard Barsi, and is out of the Pennekamp mare, Pennegale.

== Race record ==
Date	Course	Price (£K)	Odds	Runners	Place	Runner-Up	Jockey
7 August 2009	Deauville	11		14	8	Zagora	
31 November 2009	Chantilly	14		7	5	Irish Cat	
21 November 2009	Toulouse	12		3	1	Exgray	Mickael Forest
13 April 2010	Saint-cloud	15	39/10	11	1	Plain Vanilla	Christophe Soumillon
19 May 2010	Saint-cloud	24	41/10	8	1	Evaporation	Ioritz Mendizabal
4 July 2010	Chantilly	35	13/8	9	1	Fadela Style	Christophe Soumillon
22 August 2010	Deauville	35	7/4	6	1	Contredanse	Christophe Soumillon
3 October 2010	Longchamp	151	7/1	11	1	Stacelita	Ioritz Mendizabal
23 May 2011	Saint-cloud	63	4/1	6	5	Sarafina	Ioritz Mendizabal
8 July 2011	Newmarket	90	9/1	11	7	Timepiece	Christophe Soumillon
21 August 2011	Deauville	123	10/3	5	3	Announce	Christophe Soumillon

== Pedigree ==
Pedigree of Lily of the Valley, 2007
Sire Galileo (IRE) b. 1998	Sadler's Wells (USA) b. 1981	Northern Dancer (CAN) b. 1961	Nearctic (CAN)
Sire Galileo (IRE) b. 1998	Sadler's Wells (USA) b. 1981	Northern Dancer (CAN) b. 1961	Natalma (USA)
Sire Galileo (IRE) b. 1998	Sadler's Wells (USA) b. 1981	Fairy Bridge (USA) b. 1975	Bold Reason (USA)
Sire Galileo (IRE) b. 1998	Sadler's Wells (USA) b. 1981	Fairy Bridge (USA) b. 1975	Special (USA)
Sire Galileo (IRE) b. 1998	Urban Sea (USA) ch. 1989	Miswaki (USA) ch. 1978	Mr. Prospector (USA)
Sire Galileo (IRE) b. 1998	Urban Sea (USA) ch. 1989	Miswaki (USA) ch. 1978	Hopespringseternal (USA)
Sire Galileo (IRE) b. 1998	Urban Sea (USA) ch. 1989	Allegretta (GB) ch. 1978	Lombard (GER)
Sire Galileo (IRE) b. 1998	Urban Sea (USA) ch. 1989	Allegretta (GB) ch. 1978	Anatevka (GER)
Dam Pennegale (IRE) b. 1998	Pennekamp (USA) b. 1992	Bering (GB) ch. 1983	Arctic Tern (USA)
Dam Pennegale (IRE) b. 1998	Pennekamp (USA) b. 1992	Bering (GB) ch. 1983	Beaune (FR)
Dam Pennegale (IRE) b. 1998	Pennekamp (USA) b. 1992	Coral Dance (FR) b. 1978	Green Dancer (USA)
Dam Pennegale (IRE) b. 1998	Pennekamp (USA) b. 1992	Coral Dance (FR) b. 1978	Carvinia (FR)
Dam Pennegale (IRE) b. 1998	Gale Warning (IRE) b. 1988	Last Tycoon (IRE) b. 1983	Try My Best (USA)
Dam Pennegale (IRE) b. 1998	Gale Warning (IRE) b. 1988	Last Tycoon (IRE) b. 1983	Mill Princess (IRE)
Dam Pennegale (IRE) b. 1998	Gale Warning (IRE) b. 1988	Gay Apparel (CAN) dkb/br. 1975	Up Spirits (USA)
Dam Pennegale (IRE) b. 1998	Gale Warning (IRE) b. 1988	Gay Apparel (CAN) dkb/br. 1975	Brief Attire (CAN)
