= 2001 Prix de l'Arc de Triomphe =

- Location: Longchamp Racecourse
- Date: October 7, 2001
- Winning horse: Sakhee

The 2001 Prix de l'Arc de Triomphe was a horse race held at Longchamp on Sunday 7 October 2001. It was the 80th running of the Prix de l'Arc de Triomphe.

The winner was Sakhee, a four-years-old colt trained in Great Britain by Saeed bin Suroor. The winning jockey was Frankie Dettori.

== Race details ==
- Sponsor: Groupe Lucien Barrière
- Purse: 10,500,000 F; First prize: 6,000,000 F
- Going: Holding
- Distance: 2,400 metres
- Number of runners: 17
- Winner's time: 2m 36.1s

== Full result ==
| Pos. | Marg. | Horse | Age | Jockey | Trainer (Country) |
|---|---|---|---|---|---|
| 1 | | Sakhee | 4 | Frankie Dettori | Saeed bin Suroor (GB) |
| 2 | 6 | Aquarelliste | 3 | Dominique Boeuf | Élie Lellouche (FR) |
| 3 | 1 | Sagacity | 3 | Yutaka Take | André Fabre (FR) |
| 4 | shd | Golan | 3 | Kieren Fallon | Sir Michael Stoute (GB) |
| 5 | 1 | Milan | 3 | Michael Kinane | Aidan O'Brien (IRE) |
| 6 | 1½ | Little Rock | 5 | Jamie Spencer | Sir Michael Stoute (GB) |
| 7 | ½ | Hightori | 4 | Gérald Mossé | Philippe Demercastel (FR) |
| 8 | 3 | Egyptband | 4 | Olivier Doleuze | Criquette Head-Maarek (FR) |
| 9 | 2½ | Anabaa Blue | 3 | Christophe Soumillon | Carlos Lerner (FR) |
| 10 | 4 | Foreign Affairs | 3 | George Duffield | Sir Mark Prescott (GB) |
| 11 | 5 | Diamilina | 3 | Olivier Peslier | André Fabre (FR) |
| 12 | ½ | Honorifique | 4 | Thierry Gillet | Rod Collet (FR) |
| 13 | 1 | Anzillero | 4 | Kevin Woodburn | Dave Richardson (GER) |
| 14 | 5 | Idaho Quest | 4 | Thierry Thulliez | Henri-Alex Pantall (FR) |
| 15 | nk | Holding Court | 4 | Philip Robinson | Michael Jarvis (GB) |
| 16 | 20 | Saddler's Creek | 3 | Paul Scallan | Aidan O'Brien (IRE) |
| 17 | dist | Chimes at Midnight | 4 | Wayne Smith | Luke Comer (IRE) |

- Abbreviations: shd = short-head; nk = neck; dist = distance

== Winner's details ==
Further details of the winner, Sakhee.

- Sex: Colt
- Foaled: 14 February 1997
- Country: United States
- Sire: Bahri; Dam: Thawakib (Sadler's Wells)
- Owner: Godolphin
- Breeder: Shadwell Farm
