= 2005 Epsom Derby =

- Location: Epsom Downs Racecourse
- Date: 4 June 2005
- Winning horse: Motivator
- Starting price: 3/1 fav
- Jockey: Johnny Murtagh
- Trainer: Michael Bell
- Owner: Royal Ascot Racing Club

Epsom Derby 2005
1–2–3
Motivator	Walk in the Park	Dubawi

Also Ran
4–5–6
Fracas	Gypsy King	Hattan
7–8–9
Unfurled	The Geezer	Grand Central
10–11–12
Oratorio	Kings Quay	Almighty
Kong	13 Ran	2m 35.69s

The 2005 Epsom Derby was a horse race which took place at Epsom Downs on Saturday 4 June 2005. It was the 226th running of the Derby, and it was won by the pre-race favourite Motivator. The winner was ridden by Johnny Murtagh and trained by Michael Bell.

== Race details ==
- Sponsor: Vodafone
- Winner's prize money: £725,000
- Going: Good
- Number of runners: 13
- Winner's time: 2m 35.69s

== Full result ==
	*	Horse	Jockey	Trainer ^{†}	SP
1		Motivator	Johnny Murtagh	Michael Bell	3/1 fav
2	5	Walk in the Park	Alan Munro	John Hammond (FR)	11/1
3	3	Dubawi	Frankie Dettori	Saeed bin Suroor	5/1
4	1	Fracas	Jamie Spencer	David Wachman (IRE)	8/1
5	1½	Gypsy King	Kieren Fallon	Aidan O'Brien (IRE)	7/2
6	3	Hattan	Seb Sanders	Clive Brittain	25/1
7	hd	Unfurled	Ryan Moore	John Dunlop	40/1
8	1¾	The Geezer	Richard Quinn	David Elsworth	10/1
9	2	Grand Central	Jimmy Fortune	Aidan O'Brien (IRE)	25/1
10	8	Oratorio	Michael Kinane	Aidan O'Brien (IRE)	8/1
11	2	Kings Quay	Dane O'Neill	Richard Hannon, Sr.	150/1
12	¾	Almighty	Pat Smullen	Aidan O'Brien (IRE)	66/1
13	14	Kong	Richard Hughes	John Dunlop	20/1

* The distances between the horses are shown in lengths or shorter. hd = head.
† Trainers are based in Great Britain unless indicated.

== Winner's details ==
Further details of the winner, Motivator:

- Foaled: 22 February 2002 in Great Britain
- Sire: Montjeu; Dam: Out West (Gone West)
- Owner: The Royal Ascot Racing Club
- Breeder: Deerfield Farm
- Rating in 2005 World Thoroughbred Racehorse Rankings: 125

== Form analysis ==
=== Two-year-old races ===
Notable runs by the future Derby participants as two-year-olds in 2004.

- Motivator – 1st Racing Post Trophy
- Walk in the Park – 3rd Critérium International
- Dubawi – 1st Superlative Stakes, 1st National Stakes
- Oratorio – 7th Coventry Stakes, 1st Anglesey Stakes, 2nd Phoenix Stakes, 1st Futurity Stakes, 1st Prix Jean-Luc Lagardère, 2nd Dewhurst Stakes
- Kings Quay – 12th Coventry Stakes, 1st Washington Singer Stakes, 6th Somerville Tattersall Stakes

=== The road to Epsom ===
Early-season appearances in 2005 and trial races prior to running in the Derby.

- Motivator – 1st Dante Stakes
- Walk in the Park – 2nd Lingfield Derby Trial
- Dubawi – 5th 2,000 Guineas, 1st Irish 2,000 Guineas
- Fracas – 1st Sandown Classic Trial, 1st Derrinstown Stud Derby Trial
- Gypsy King – 1st Dee Stakes
- Hattan – 3rd Sandown Classic Trial, 1st Chester Vase
- Unfurled – 1st Predominate Stakes
- The Geezer – 2nd Dante Stakes
- Grand Central – 2nd Leopardstown 2,000 Guineas Trial Stakes, 3rd Derrinstown Stud Derby Trial
- Oratorio – 4th 2,000 Guineas, 2nd Irish 2,000 Guineas
- Kings Quay – 5th Easter Stakes, 2nd Feilden Stakes, 6th Sandown Classic Trial, 6th Lingfield Derby Trial
- Almighty – 4th Ballysax Stakes, 2nd Chester Vase
- Kong – 1st Lingfield Derby Trial

=== Subsequent Group 1 wins ===
Group 1 / Grade I victories after running in the Derby.

- Dubawi – Prix Jacques Le Marois (2005)
- Oratorio – Eclipse Stakes (2005), Irish Champion Stakes (2005)

== Subsequent breeding careers ==
Leading progeny of participants in the 2005 Epsom Derby.

=== Sires of Classic winners ===
Dubawi (3rd)

- Waldpark - 1st Deutsches Derby (2008)
- Makfi - 1st 2000 Guineas Stakes (2010)
- Night of Thunder - 1st 2000 Guineas Stakes (2014)
- New Bay - 1st Prix du Jockey Club (2015)

Motivator (1st)

- Treve - 1st Prix de Diane (2013), 1st Prix de l'Arc de Triomphe (2013, 2014)
- Ridasiyna - 1st Prix de l'Opéra (2012)

=== Sires of Group/Grade One winners ===
Oratorio (10th) - Later exported to South Africa

- Beethoven - 1st Dewhurst Stakes (2009)
- Military Attack - Hong Kong Horse of the Year (2012-13)
- Mourinho - 1st Underwood Stakes (2015)
- Tidara Angel - 1st Prix Alain du Breil (2011)

=== Sires of National Hunt horses ===
Dubawi (3rd)

- Dodging Bullets - Tingle Creek Chase (2014), 1st Clarence House Chase (2015), 1st Queen Mother Champion Chase (2015)

Motivator (1st)

- Pentland Hills - 1st Triumph Hurdle (2019)

Walk In The Park (2nd)

- Douvan - 1st Paddy Power Cashcard Chase (2016)
- Park Light - 1st Prix Hubert d'Aillieres (2016)
- Walk In The Mill - 1st Becher Chase (2018, 2019)
- Min - 1st Melling Chase (2019)
- Facile Vega – 1st Champion Bumper (2022), 1st KPMG Champion Novice Hurdle (2023)

=== Other Stallions ===
Fracas (4th) - Fairly useful flat and jumps winners including Smash Williams (1st Round Tower Stakes 2015)
