= Presvis =

British-bred Thoroughbred racehorse

- Sire: Sakhee
- Grandsire: Bahri
- Dam: Forest Fire
- Damsire: Never So Bold
- Sex: Gelding
- Foaled: 10 March 2004
- Country: United Kingdom
- Colour: Bay
- Breeder: Mette Campbell-Andenaes
- Owner: Leonidas Marinopoulos
- Trainer: Luca Cumani
- Record: 28: 8-6-3
- Earnings: £4,318,943

Major wins
- John Smith's Stakes (2008); Queen Elizabeth II Cup (2009); Jebel Hatta (2010); Al Rashidiya (2011); Dubai Duty Free (2011)

Presvis (10 March 2004 – 17 October 2012) was a British Thoroughbred racehorse. Although he did not race until the age of four and never won a major race in his native country, he was one of the most financially successful British-trained horses of all-time, winning well over £4 million in prize money. He was trained throughout his career by Luca Cumani and ridden in most of his major races by Ryan Moore. The gelding was suited by extreme "hold-up" tactics and was usually restrained at the rear of the field before being produced for a late run in the straight. He was rated among the world's hundred best racehorses in 2009, 2010 and 2011.

Presvis began his racing career in 2008, winning two of his seven races including a valuable handicap race at Newbury Racecourse. In the following year he raced in Dubai, Hong Kong and Singapore, winning two handicaps at Nad Al Sheba Racecourse and the Queen Elizabeth II Cup as well as finishing second in the Dubai Duty Free and the Singapore Airlines International Cup. His only success in six starts in 2010 came when he won the Jebel Hatta at Meydan Racecourse in March. In the early part of 2011 at Meydan he won the Al Rashidiya and finished third in the Jebel Hatta before recording his most important win in the Dubai Duty Free. He failed to finish better than fifth in his remaining five races. He was retired from racing in 2012 and died later that year.

== Background ==
Presvis was a bay gelding with a narrow white blaze and white markings on his hind feet bred in the United Kingdom by Mette Campbell-Andenaes. He was from the first crop of foals sired by Sakhee who won the Prix de l'Arc de Triomphe and the International Stakes as well as finishing second in The Derby and the Breeders' Cup Classic. His other progeny have included Sakhee's Secret and Tin Horse (Poule d'Essai des Poulains). Presvis's dam Forest Fire was a Swedish-bred mare who won four races in Britain in 1998 and 1999. She was descended from the British broodmare Queen of the Chase, a half-sister of the King's Stand Stakes winner Vilmorin.

Presvis was sent to the Tattersalls sale as a foal in November 2004 and was bought for 15,000 guineas by Will Edmeades Bloodstock. A year later, Presvis returned to Tattersalls and was sold for 30,000 guineas to Amanda Skiffington. The horse was subsequently gelded and entered the ownership of Leonidas Marinopoulos. He was sent into training with Luca Cumani at his Bedford House stable in Newmarket, Suffolk.

== Racing career ==
=== 2008: four-year-old season ===
Presvis began his racing career as a four-year-old in May 2008 when he finished third in a one-mile maiden race at Haydock Park and then finished fifth in similar events at Thirsk and Haydock. At Sandown Park Racecourse on 17 July he started 3/1 favourite for a ten furlong handicap race and recorded his first win, taking the lead approaching the final furlong and drawing away to win by nine lengths. He then finished second in ten furlong handicaps at Sandown and Newmarket. On his final appearance of the year, Presvis carried 127 pounds in the John Smith's Stakes at Newbury Racecourse on 20 September. Ridden by Ryan Moore he recovered from being hampered in the early stages to take the lead a furlong out and won by seven lengths from Rose Street. In the autumn of 2008, the gelding was strongly fancied for both the Cambridgeshire and the November Handicap but was withdrawn from both races.

=== 2009: five-year-old season ===
In early 2009 Presvis was sent to race in the United Arab Emirates and ran three times at Nad Al Sheba Racecourse, ridden on each occasion by Moore. He won the Al Tayer Motors Trophy by three and a half lengths on 22 January and the Meydan Gate Towers Trophy five weeks later. On 28 March he started at odds of 10/1 for the Dubai Duty Free and stayed on strongly in the straight to finish second of the sixteen runners behind Gladiatorus, with Vodka, Kip Deville, Archipenko (Queen Elizabeth II Cup, runner-up in the Arlington Million) and Paco Boy among the unplaced runners. Presvis was then sent to Hong Kong to contest the Queen Elizabeth II Cup at Sha Tin Racecourse on 26 April. His opponents included the local champion Viva Pataca as well as Archipenko, Thumbs Up (Hong Kong Classic Mile) and Packing Winner (Champions & Chater Cup). Presvis raced last of the ten runners until the straight, when he began to make rapid progress on the inside. He took the lead 100 metres from the finish and won by a length from Viva Pataca, with Thumbs Up taking third ahead of the French-trained Chinchon. After the race Moore said "That went perfectly. I was happy to sit in last as the gallop was honest on that ground. I was never worried as he was handling the ground well. When I asked him once he picked up one horse; I knew he'd pick them all up." Cumani commented "Presvis showed in Dubai that he belonged in group one company, and he's proved himself today". Three weeks later, Previs started favourite for the Singapore Airlines International Cup at Kranji Racecourse. After being restrained in last place he produced a strong late run but failed by a head to overhaul the Brazilian champion Gloria de Campeao. Moore felt that the horse had been an unlucky loser as he had been blocked and unable to obtain a clear run at a crucial stage, whilst Cumani said that he had been unsuited by the course.

After a six-month break, Presvis made his first and only appearance of the year in England when he started 4/5 favourite for the Listed Churchill Stakes on the synthetic Polytrack surface at Lingfield Park Racecourse. After being held up in last place he stayed on well in the straight but was beaten three lengths into second place by the Henry Cecil-trained Tranquil Tiger. On his final appearance of the season, Presvis was sent to Hong Kong again for the Hong Kong Cup on 13 December and came from last place in the early stages to finish third behind Vision d'Etat and Collection.

=== 2010: six-year-old season ===
Presvis returned to Dubai in early 2010 for three races at the newly opened Meydan Racecourse. He finished second to Allybar when favourite for the Al Tayar Motors Trophy on the synthetic Tapeta surface on 5 February and then won the Group Two Jebel Hatta on turf a month later, coming from last place to beat the favoured Alexandros by one and a half lengths. Presvis then ran for the second time in the Dubai Duty Free but never looked likely to challenge the leaders and finished eleventh of the sixteen runners behind the 40/1 outsider Al Shemali. In his three other races that year, Presvis finished fifth to Viva Pataca in the Queen Elizabeth II Cup, fifth to Lizard's Desire in the Singapore Airlines International Cup and ninth behind Byword in the Prince of Wales's Stakes at Royal Ascot.

=== 2011: seven-year-old season ===
For the third year in succession, Presvis began his season in Dubai and began his campaign on 27 January with a win in the Group Two Al Rashidiya, coming from last place to take the lead inside the final furlong and winning by almost five lengths from Steele Tango. Cumani commented "He did it very, very well. I was very pleased as I thought he would need the race. I’ve not been able to do everything I wanted with him, but he probably knows best now. Ryan gets on with him like a house on fire. I didn’t give him any orders, I just said go out there and do what you normally do".

On 3 March Presvis attempted to repeat his 2010 success in the Jebel Hatta, but despite producing his customary late surge he finished third behind Wigmore Hall and Poet's Voice. Three weeks later the gelding ran for the third time in the Dubai Duty Free and started 5/1 favourite in a sixteen-runner field. His opponents included Wigmore Hall, the South African mare River Jetez, Mendip, Beauty Flash (Hong Kong Mile) and Debussy. After starting slowly, he took up his usual position at the rear of the field before making progress approaching the straight. He took the lead 100 metres from the finish and won by three quarters of a length from River Jetez, with Wigmore Hall a length and a half away in third. Ryan Moore commented "He's a very talented horse; he deserved that. A lot of hard work goes into him in the mornings and this is one for the whole team. They went a good gallop initially, then the pace slackened a bit and he got the gaps when I needed them. Usually, he quickens between horses and he had to fight to beat off the mare".

Presvis was then dropped in distance to race over one mile for the first time since 2008 and finished sixth in the Champions Mile at Sha Tin, beaten less than two lengths by the winner Xtension. In May he started second favourite for the Singapore Airlines International Cup but after running wide on the final turn he made no impression in the straight and finished tenth of the twelve runners behind the five-year-old Gitano Hernando.

=== 2012: eight-year-old season ===
Presvis ended his racing career with three runs at Meydan in early 2012. He finished fifth behind the Australian-bred Musir in the Al Rashidiya and ninth to the Aidan O'Brien-trained Master of Hounds in the Jebel Hatta. On his final racecourse appearance he contested the Dubai Duty Free for the fourth time but made no impact, finishing fourteenth of the fifteen runners behind Cityscape.

In addition to a career haul of £4.3m in prize-money, he accumulated 75,000 airmiles journeying for his races.

== Retirement and death ==
Presvis did not race again after his runs in the UAE in early 2012 and was retired to France. In the autumn of the same year he contracted colic and was euthanised on 17 October.

== Assessment ==
In the 2009 edition of the World's Best Racehorse Rankings Presvis was given a rating of 120 making him the equal 43rd best racehorse in the world. He was given both the same rating and the same ranking in the following year. In 2011 he was yet again given a rating of 120, although his ranking dropped to 59.

== Pedigree ==
Pedigree of Presvis (GB), bay gelding, 2004
| Sire Sakhee (USA) 1997 | Bahri (USA); 1992 | Riverman | Never Bend |
| Sire Sakhee (USA) 1997 | Bahri (USA); 1992 | Riverman | River Lady |
| Sire Sakhee (USA) 1997 | Bahri (USA); 1992 | Wasnah | Nijinsky |
| Sire Sakhee (USA) 1997 | Bahri (USA); 1992 | Wasnah | Highest Trump |
| Sire Sakhee (USA) 1997 | Thawakib (IRE); 1990 | Sadler's Wells | Northern Dancer |
| Sire Sakhee (USA) 1997 | Thawakib (IRE); 1990 | Sadler's Wells | Fairy Bridge |
| Sire Sakhee (USA) 1997 | Thawakib (IRE); 1990 | Tobira Celeste | Ribot |
| Sire Sakhee (USA) 1997 | Thawakib (IRE); 1990 | Tobira Celeste | Heavenly Body |
| Dam Forest Fire (SWE) 1995 | Never So Bold (IRE); 1980 | Bold Lad (IRE) | Bold Ruler |
| Dam Forest Fire (SWE) 1995 | Never So Bold (IRE); 1980 | Bold Lad (IRE) | Barn Pride |
| Dam Forest Fire (SWE) 1995 | Never So Bold (IRE); 1980 | Never Never Land | Habitat |
| Dam Forest Fire (SWE) 1995 | Never So Bold (IRE); 1980 | Never Never Land | Whimsical |
| Dam Forest Fire (SWE) 1995 | Mango Sampaquita (SWE); 1985 | Colombian Friend | Fair Ruler |
| Dam Forest Fire (SWE) 1995 | Mango Sampaquita (SWE); 1985 | Colombian Friend | Faint Blosom |
| Dam Forest Fire (SWE) 1995 | Mango Sampaquita (SWE); 1985 | Twins Fire | Firestreak |
| Dam Forest Fire (SWE) 1995 | Mango Sampaquita (SWE); 1985 | Twins Fire | Forest Row (Family: 7-d) |
