= Tamayuz =

British-bred Thoroughbred racehorse

- Sire: Nayef
- Grandsire: Gulch
- Dam: Al Ishq
- Damsire: Nureyev
- Sex: Stallion
- Foaled: 1 March 2005
- Country: United Kingdom
- Colour: Chestnut
- Breeder: Shadwell Estate Company
- Owner: Hamdan Al Maktoum
- Trainer: Freddy Head
- Record: 7: 5-0-0
- Earnings: £482,505

Major wins
- Prix de Fontainebleau (2008); Prix Jean Prat (2008); Prix Jacques Le Marois (2008)

Tamayuz (foaled 1 March 2005) is a British-bred, French-trained Thoroughbred racehorse and sire. He won both of his races as a two-year-old in 2007 and took the Prix de Fontainebleau on his first run of 2008. After running poorly in the Poule d'Essai des Poulains he recorded Group 1 wins Prix Jean Prat and Prix Jacques Le Marois. On his only subsequent start he finished fourth in the Queen Elizabeth II Stakes. He has had some success as a breeding stallion.

== Background ==
Tamayuz is a chestnut horse with a small white star bred in England by his owner, Hamdan Al Maktoum's Shadwell Estate Company. The colt was sent to France where he was trained Freddy Head. He was ridden in all but one of his races by Davy Bonilla.

He was one of best horses sired by Hamdan Al Maktoum's stallion Nayef, a top-class middle-distance horse whose wins included the Champion Stakes, Sheema Classic, International Stakes and Prince of Wales's Stakes. Tamayuz's dam Al Ishq showed modest racing ability, winning one race from four starts in France. As a daughter of Allez les Trois she was a half-sister to Anabaa Blue and a granddaughter of the great British broodmare Allegretta, meaning that she was closely related to Urban Sea, King's Best, Galileo and Sea the Stars.

== Racing career ==
=== 2007: two-year-old season ===
On 9 September at Longchamp Racecourse Tamayuz was ridden by Thierry Jarnet when he made his racecourse debut in a race for previously unraced juveniles over 1600 metres. Starting at odds of 6/1 he finished strongly and won by a short neck from Prospect Wells, a horse who went on to win the Prix Greffulhe. In the Prix des Aigles over the same distance at Chantilly Racecourse a month later the colt was ridden for the first time by Bonilla and started favourite against six opponents. He took the lead 200 metres from the finish and won "comfortably" by two and a half lengths from the Pascal Bary-trained Ransome Hope.

=== 2008: three-year-old season ===
On his first appearance as a three-year-old Tamayuz was stepped up in class to contest the Group 3 Prix de Fontainebleau over 1600 metres on heavy ground at Longchamp on 13 April. After turning into the straight in fourth place he was switched to the outside, took the lead 100 metres from the finish and won by a head from the 30/1 outsider Murcielago. In the Poule d'Essai des Poulains over the same course and distance on 11 May the colt was restrained at the rear of the field before making steady progress in the straight but never looked likely to win and came home ninth of the nineteen runners behind Falco.

On 13 July at Chantilly Tamayuz started a 14/1 outsider for the Prix Jean Prat over 1600 metres. The British-trained Raven's Pass started favourite while the other fourteen runners included Falco, Rio de la Plata (Prix Jean-Luc Lagardère), Winker Watson (July Stakes), Arcadia's Angle (Prix Paul de Moussac), Murcielago, Trincot (Prix de Guiche) and Kandahar Run (Newmarket Stakes). Bonilla positioned the colt behind the pacemakers before sending him into the lead 400 metres from the finish. Tamayuz ran on under pressure to win by one and a half lengths from Raven's Pass with Rio de la Plata half a length back in third.

Tamayuz was matched against older horses for the first time in the Prix Jacques Le Marois over 1600 metres at Deauville Racecourse on 17 August and was made the 11/8 favourite. The best fancied of his seven opponents were Sageburg (Prix d'Ispahan), Natagora, Major Cadeaux (Sandown Mile) and Racinger (Prix du Muguet). After tracking the leader Racinger, Tamayuz went to the front 400 metres out and won by two and a half lengths from Natagora. Freddy Head said "That was great. Everything went to plan. He's a real champion".

For his final racecourse appearance, Tamayuz was sent to England to contest the Queen Elizabeth II Stakes at Ascot Racecourse on 27 September. Starting the 9/4 second favourite he briefly took the lead in the straight but was soon overtaken and came home fourth of the seven runner behind Raven's Pass, Henrythenavigator and Sabana Perdida.

In the 2008 World Thoroughbred Rankings Tamayuz was given a rating of 124, making him the thirteenth-best racehorse in the world.

== Stud career ==
Tamayuz was retired from racing to become a breeding stallion. By 2018 he was standing at the Derrinstown Stud in Ireland at a fee of €12,500.

His offspring have included Precieuse (Poule d'Essai des Pouliches), G Force (Haydock Sprint Cup), Blond Me (E. P. Taylor Stakes), Mustashry (Joel Stakes, Lockinge Stakes), Desert Skyline (Doncaster Cup) and Sir Prancealot (Flying Childers Stakes).

== Pedigree ==
Pedigree of Tamayuz (USA), chestnut stallion, 2005
Sire Nayef (USA) 1998	Gulch; 1984	Mr. Prospector	Raise a Native
Sire Nayef (USA) 1998	Gulch; 1984	Mr. Prospector	Gold Digger
Sire Nayef (USA) 1998	Gulch; 1984	Jameela	Rambunctious
Sire Nayef (USA) 1998	Gulch; 1984	Jameela	Asbury Mary
Sire Nayef (USA) 1998	Height of Fashion (FR); 1979	Bustino (GB)	Busted
Sire Nayef (USA) 1998	Height of Fashion (FR); 1979	Bustino (GB)	Ship Yard
Sire Nayef (USA) 1998	Height of Fashion (FR); 1979	Highclere (GB)	Queen's Hussar
Sire Nayef (USA) 1998	Height of Fashion (FR); 1979	Highclere (GB)	Highlight
Dam Al Ishq (FR) 1997	Nureyev (USA); 1977	Northern Dancer (CAN)	Nearctic
Dam Al Ishq (FR) 1997	Nureyev (USA); 1977	Northern Dancer (CAN)	Natalma (USA)
Dam Al Ishq (FR) 1997	Nureyev (USA); 1977	Special	Forli (ARG)
Dam Al Ishq (FR) 1997	Nureyev (USA); 1977	Special	Thong
Dam Al Ishq (FR) 1997	Allez les Trois (USA); 1991	Riverman	Never Bend
Dam Al Ishq (FR) 1997	Allez les Trois (USA); 1991	Riverman	River Lady
Dam Al Ishq (FR) 1997	Allez les Trois (USA); 1991	Allegretta (GB)	Lombard (GER)
Dam Al Ishq (FR) 1997	Allez les Trois (USA); 1991	Allegretta (GB)	Anatevka (GER) (Family: 9-h)
