= Anabaa =

American-bred Thoroughbred racehorse

- Sire: Danzig
- Grandsire: Northern Dancer
- Dam: Balbonella
- Damsire: Gay Mecene
- Sex: Stallion
- Foaled: 1992
- Country: United States
- Colour: Bay
- Breeder: Gainsborough Farm
- Owner: Maktoum Al Maktoum; Ghislaine Head
- Trainer: Criquette Head-Maarek
- Record: 10: 6-1-1
- Earnings: £ 293,677

Major wins
- Prix de Saint-Georges (1996); Prix du Gros Chêne (1996); July Cup (1996); Prix Maurice de Gheest (1996)

Awards
- European Champion Sprinter (1996)

Anabaa (1992–2009) was an American-bred champion Thoroughbred racehorse who was trained in France during a racing career which lasted from September 1995 to October 1996. Anabaa failed to win until the age of four, but in 1996 he won his first six starts including two Group One races; the July Cup in England and the Prix Maurice de Gheest in France. At the end of the season he was named European Champion Sprinter at the Cartier Racing Awards. He later had a successful career at stud, becoming particularly known as the sire of Goldikova.

== Background ==
Anabaa was bred in Kentucky by his original owner, Maktoum Al Maktoum's Gainsborough Stud.

His sire Danzig, who ran only three times before his career was ended by injury, was a highly successful stallion who sired the winners of more than fifty Grade I/Group One races. His offspring include the champions Chief's Crown, Dayjur and Lure as well as the important stallions Green Desert and Danehill. Anabaa's dam Balbonella was a high class racehorse who won the Prix Robert Papin in France and the Dahlia Handicap in California. She proved equally successful as a broodmare, producing the Poule d'Essai des Pouliches winner Always Loyal, and Key of Luck who won the Prix d'Arenberg and sired The Derby winner Alamshar.

Anabaa was owned as a four-year-old by Ghislaine Head, trained throughout his career by her daughter Criquette and ridden in all but one of his races by her son Freddie. At the time of Anabaa's greatest success, Freddie Head, at 49, was the oldest professional jockey in France.

== Racing career ==
=== 1995: three-year-old season ===
As a two-year-old Anabaa was diagnosed as being a "wobbler", which delayed his appearance on the racecourse until late the following year. Anabaa ran three times without success in the autumn of 1995. He was campaigned ambitiously, making his debut in a Listed race at Longchamp in September in which he finished fourth. He was then moved up to the highest level to finish sixth of the ten runners in the Group One Prix de la Forêt in October. On his final start he was dropped back down to Listed class and finished third in a three-way photo finish at Évry.

=== 1996: four-year-old season ===
In March 1996, Anabaa made his first appearance as a four-year-old when he won an 1100m Listed race at Évry by five lengths. A month later over the same course and distance, he won another Listed race by seven lengths.

His reputation was growing, and only three horses opposed him when he moved back up to Group class for the Prix de Saint-Georges at Longchamp in May. Freddie Head tracked the English-trained filly Millyant in the early stages before allowing Anabaa to move into the lead 400m from the finish. The colt quickly went clear and won his first Group race "very easily" by six lengths. Three weeks later, Anabaa was sent to Deauville for the Prix du Gros Chêne for which he was made 3/10 favourite. The race reflected the betting as Anabaa moved up to take the lead 200m out and recorded an "impressive" two length win.

The July Cup over six furlongs at Newmarket seemed likely to provide Anabaa with his first real test of the season. Apart from the reigning Champion Sprinter Hever Golf Rose, the field included the highly regarded English colts Pivotal and Mind Games, who had finished first and second in the King's Stand Stakes. In a change of tactics, Head sent Anabaa into the lead from the start, and the colt was never headed. In the final furlong, he ran on strongly to win by one and three quarter lengths from Lucayan Prince. In August Anabaa returned to Deauville for the Group One Prix Maurice de Gheest, for which he started at odds of 1/2 in a field of nine. On this occasion, the colt was held up by Freddie Head before taking the lead 200m out and winning "comfortably" by a length and a half from Miesque's Son.

In October, Anabaa started at odds of 3/10 for the Prix de l'Abbaye at Longchamp, where he was under pressure after 400m. He then responded to pass the English-trained filly Eveningperformance and take the lead inside the last 200m, only to be caught in the closing strides and beaten a neck by his stable companion Kistena.

== Assessment and honours ==
At the 1996 Cartier Racing Awards Anabaa was named European Champion Sprinter.

== Stud career ==
Anabaa stood as a stallion at the Haras du Quesnay near Deauville, until his death in 2009. He was also shuttled to stand in Australia for the Southern Hemisphere breeding season and spent 2007 at the Castlelyons Stud in Lexington, Kentucky. Despite being a sprinter, his progeny succeeded across a wide range of distances. His most famous offspring is the record-breaking mare Goldikova who excelled over a mile, while the best of his sons have been Anabaa Blue who won the Group One Prix du Jockey Club over 2400m (one and a half miles) and Precision, who won the Hong Kong Cup over a mile and a quarter. Anabaa is the damsire of the 2013 Prix de l'Arc de Triomphe winner Treve. Anabaa died on 7 July 2009 from peritonitis after undergoing surgery for colic. At the time of his death his stud fee was €30,000.

== Pedigree ==
Pedigree of Anabaa (USA), bay stallion, 1992
Sire Danzig (USA) 1977	Northern Dancer; 1961	Nearctic	Nearco
Sire Danzig (USA) 1977	Northern Dancer; 1961	Nearctic	Lady Angela
Sire Danzig (USA) 1977	Northern Dancer; 1961	Natalma	Native Dancer
Sire Danzig (USA) 1977	Northern Dancer; 1961	Natalma	Almahmoud
Sire Danzig (USA) 1977	Pas de Nom; 1968	Admiral's Voyage	Crafty Admiral
Sire Danzig (USA) 1977	Pas de Nom; 1968	Admiral's Voyage	Olympia Lou
Sire Danzig (USA) 1977	Pas de Nom; 1968	Petitioner	Petition
Sire Danzig (USA) 1977	Pas de Nom; 1968	Petitioner	Steady Aim
Dam Balbonella (FR) 1984	Gay Mecene; 1975	Vaguely Noble	Vienna
Dam Balbonella (FR) 1984	Gay Mecene; 1975	Vaguely Noble	Noble Lassie
Dam Balbonella (FR) 1984	Gay Mecene; 1975	Gay Missile	Sir Gaylord
Dam Balbonella (FR) 1984	Gay Mecene; 1975	Gay Missile	Missy Baba
Dam Balbonella (FR) 1984	Bamieres; 1978	Riverman	Never Bend
Dam Balbonella (FR) 1984	Bamieres; 1978	Riverman	River Lady
Dam Balbonella (FR) 1984	Bamieres; 1978	Bergamasque	Kashmir
Dam Balbonella (FR) 1984	Bamieres; 1978	Bergamasque	Bergame(Family: 1-n)
