= Prix Bertrand du Breuil =

Prix du Betrand du Breuil
- Class: Group 3
- Location: Chantilly Racecourse; Chantilly, France
- Inaugurated: 1852
- Race type: Flat / Thoroughbred
- Website: france-galop.com

Race information
- Distance: 1,600 metres (1 mile)
- Surface: Turf
- Track: Right-handed
- Qualification: Four-years-old and up exc. G1 winners this year
- Weight: 56 kg Allowances; 1½ kg for fillies and mares Penalties; 3 kg for Group 1 winners * 2 kg for Group 2 winners * 1 kg for Group 3 winners * * since September 1 last year
- Purse: €80,000 (2015); 1st: €40,000

Prix Bertrand du Breuil
2025
Zabiari	Marhaba Ya Sanafi	Make Me King

Previous years
2024
Marhaba Ya Sanafi	Andromede	Bullace
2023
Tribalist	Topgear	Russipant Fal
2022
Djo Francais	Dilawar	Jeri
2021
Ecrivain	Sagamiyra	Reshabar

2020-2011
2020
Pretreville	Plumatic	Skalleti
2019
Vintager	Trais Fluors	Lunch Lady
2018
Hunaina	Trais Fluors	Wireless
2017
Taareef	Zelzal	Siyoushake
2016
Pas De Deux	Impassable	Sea Front
2015
Fintry	Avenir Certain	Faufiler
2014
Pinturicchio	Spoil The Fun	Silas Marner
2013
Mainsail	Laygirl	Poupee Flash
2012
Vagabond Shoes	Moonwalk In Paris	Evaporation
2011
Byword	Vagabond Shoes	Beacon Lodge

2010-2001
2010
Fuisse	Vertigineux	Slickly Royal
2009
Beacon Lodge	Sahpresa	Precious Boy
2008
Spirito Del Vento	Athanor	Mount Nelson
2007
Spirito Del Vento	Multiplex	Passager
2006
Apsis	Turtle Bowl	Early March
2005
Cacique	Special Kaldoun	Tiganello
2004
My Risk	Charming Groom	Star Valley
2003
Tripat	Special Kaldoun	Bernebeau
2002
Domedriver	Altieri	Greengroom
2001
Mahfooth	Up And Away	Terre A Terre

2000-1990
2000
Kingsalsa	Banyumanik	Le Roi Chic
1999
Field Of Hope	Alliteration	Hoh Chi Min
1998
Jim And Tonic	Kaldou Star	Go Between
1997
Perim	Battle Dore	Trojan Sea
1996
Nec Plus Ultra	Manzoni	Vetheuil
1995
Kaldounevees	Fraam	Agathe
1994
Zabar	Jeune Homme	Lit De Justice
1993
Africanus	Shanghai	Gothland
1992
As Que To	Star Of Cozzene	Hello Pink
1991
Goofalik	Boxing Day	Eightsome
1990
Mister Sicy	Monsagem	Val Des Bois

The Prix Bertrand du Breuil is a Group 3 flat horse race in France open to thoroughbreds aged four years or older. It is run at Chantilly over a distance of 1,600 metres (about 1 mile), and it is scheduled to take place each year in June.

== History ==
The earliest version of the event was established at Chantilly in 1852. Its prize money was originally provided by the Chemin de Fer du Nord, a railway company in northern France and the race was titled the Prix de Chemin du Fer du Nord. The first running was a 1,200-metre flat race for two-year-olds, and in the following years it was a 2,400-metre event over hurdles. It reverted to being a flat race in 1856, when it became a 3,200-metre contest for horses aged three or older.

The Chemin de Fer du Nord continued to provide the total prize money until 1910. Thereafter, it contributed a partial amount each year until 1937. The funding discontinued when the regional railways merged to form the SNCF.

The present Prix du Chemin de Fer du Nord was created in 1933, when its distance was cut to 1,400 metres. It was cancelled in 1940, and for the next two years it was held at Longchamp. It was run at Maisons-Laffitte in 1943, and was cancelled again in 1944. Another spell at Longchamp began in 1945.

The race was extended to 1,700 metres in 1950. It returned to Chantilly and reverted to 1,400 metres in 1955. The minimum age was raised to four in 1967, and the distance was increased to 1,600 metres in 1972.

The event was staged at Maisons-Laffitte in 1997 and 1998, and its current period at Chantilly began in 1999. It is now held on the same day as the Prix de Diane.

In 2013 the race was renamed in memory of Bertrand du Breuil (1926–2011), the last president of the Societe d'Encouragemment, forerunner of France Galop.

== Records ==
Most successful horse (2 wins):

- Menetrier – 1948, 1949
- Spirito del Vento – 2007, 2008

Leading jockey (7 wins):

- Freddy Head – Apataki (1966), Regent Street (1969), My Friend Paul (1973), Rostov (1980), Big John (1982), Pluralisme (1984), Pink (1985)

Leading trainer (7 wins):

- André Fabre – Mill Native (1988), French Stress (1989), Kingsalsa (2000), Cacique (2005), Apsis (2006), Byword (2011), Fintry (2015)

Leading owner (4 wins):

- Khalid Abdullah – Cacique (2005), Apsis (2006), Byword (2011). Mainsail (2013)

== Winners since 1981 ==
Year	Winner	Age	Jockey	Trainer	Owner	Time
1981	Gosport	5	Jean-Claude Desaint	J. C. Cunnington	Jean Laborde
1982	Big John	4	Freddy Head	E. Chevalier du Fau	John Michael	1:38.80
1983	Pampabird	4	Maurice Philipperon	John Cunnington Jr.	Paul de Moussac
1984	Pluralisme	4	Freddy Head	Criquette Head	Jacques Wertheimer
1985	Pink	4	Freddy Head	Criquette Head	Jacques Wertheimer
1986	Sarab	5	Richard Quinn	Paul Cole	Fahd Salman
1987	Relasure	4	Tony Cruz	Patrick Biancone	Ecurie Jules Ouaki
1988	Mill Native	4	Cash Asmussen	André Fabre	Paul de Moussac	1:36.80
1989	French Stress	4	Cash Asmussen	André Fabre	Paul de Moussac	1:42.90
1990	Mister Sicy	4	Gérald Mossé	Nicolas Clément	Mrs Michael Cahan	1:37.70
1991	Goofalik	4	Cash Asmussen	John Hammond	David Thompson	1:39.70
1992	As Que To	4	Dominique Boeuf	Élie Lellouche	Edgard Zorbibe	1:38.80
1993	Africanus	4	Dominique Boeuf	Élie Lellouche	Daniel Wildenstein	1:49.00
1994	Zabar	6	Frankie Dettori	Jonathan Pease	Gerald Leigh	1:36.90
1995	Kaldounevees	4	Cash Asmussen	John Hammond	Ecurie Chalhoub	1:37.00
1996	Nec Plus Ultra	5	Thierry Gillet	Alain de Royer-Dupré	Marquesa de Moratalla	1:39.30
1997	Perim	4	Guy Guignard	Gérard-Alain Lièvre	Gérard-Alain Lièvre	1:38.80
1998	Jim and Tonic	4	Gérald Mossé	François Doumen	John Martin	1:37.80
1999	Field of Hope	4	Sylvain Guillot	Pascal Bary	Grundy Bloodstock Ltd	1:41.40
2000	Kingsalsa	4	Olivier Peslier	André Fabre	Daniel Wildenstein	1:41.60
2001	Mahfooth	4	Thierry Jarnet	Saeed bin Suroor	Godolphin	1:38.40
2002	Domedriver	4	Thierry Thulliez	Pascal Bary	Niarchos Family	1:38.80
2003	Tripat	4	Thierry Jarnet	Richard Gibson	Ecurie J. L. Bouchard	1:37.50
2004	My Risk	5	Christophe Soumillon	Jean-Marie Béguigné	Roland Monnier	1:36.10
2005	Cacique	4	Christophe Soumillon	André Fabre	Khalid Abdullah	1:37.30
2006	Apsis	5	Christophe Soumillon	André Fabre	Khalid Abdullah	1:35.00
2007	Spirito del Vento	4	Kieren Fallon	Jean-Marie Béguigné	Luigi Ciampi	1:34.60
2008	Spirito del Vento	5	Olivier Peslier	Jean-Marie Béguigné	Luigi Ciampi	1:36.50
2009	Beacon Lodge	4	Gérald Mossé	Clive Cox	Mr & Mrs P. Hargreaves	1:34.87
2010	Fuisse	4	Christophe Lemaire	Criquette Head-Maarek	Haras du Quesnay	1:36.90
2011	Byword	5	Maxime Guyon	André Fabre	Khalid Abdullah	1:36.76
2012	Vagabond Shoes	5	Stéphane Pasquier	Yan Durepaire	Javier Martinez Salmean	1:38.78
2013	Mainsail	4	Christophe Soumillon	Pascal Bary	Khalid Abdullah	1:41.94
2014	Pinturicchio	6	Anthony Crastus	Élie Lellouche	Julia Rusu	1:35.49
2015	Fintry	4	Mickael Barzalona	André Fabre	Godolphin	1:36.00
2016	Pas de Deux	6	Antoine Coutier	Yasmin Almenrader	Dirk Von Mitzlaff	1:37.64
2017	Taareef	4	Ioritz Mendizabal	Jean-Claude Rouget	Hamdan Al Maktoum	1:34.57
2018	Hunaina	4	Mickael Barzalona	Henri-François Devin	Trevor C Stewart	1:36.05
2019	Vintager	4	James Doyle	Charlie Appleby	Godolphin	1:36.74
2020	Pretreville	5	Cristian Demuro	Pascal Bary	Gerard Augustin-Normand	1:34.50
2021	Ecrivain	4	Maxime Guyon	Carlos Laffon-Parias	Wertheimer et Frère	1:36.11
2022	Djo Francais	4	Cristian Demuro	Jean-Claude Rouget	Joseph Lesguer	1:39.00
2026	Remmooz	4	Callum Rodriguez	Owen Burrows	Sheikh Ahmed Al Maktoum	1:37:69

== Earlier winners ==
- 1933: Dickens
- 1934: Rodosto
- 1935: Rarity
- 1936: Le Cyclone
- 1937: Republique
- 1938: Mandoline
- 1939: Earnest
- 1940: no race
- 1941: Thread
- 1942: Balthazar / Panipat *
- 1943: Fine Art
- 1944: no race
- 1945: Tango
- 1946: Vagabond
- 1947: Thiercelin
- 1948: Menetrier
- 1949: Menetrier
- 1950: Eppi d'Or
- 1951: Commando
- 1952: Norman
- 1953: Voltaire
- 1954: Fine Top
- 1955: Soleil Royal
- 1956:
- 1957: Renard
- 1958:
- 1959:
- 1960: Rina
- 1961: Galant Gaditan
- 1962: Cassis
- 1963: Hodell
- 1964: Nandou
- 1965: Present
- 1966: Apataki
- 1967: Village Square
- 1968: Calife
- 1969: Regent Street
- 1970: Irish Minstrel
- 1971: Joshua
- 1972: Etoile Lointaine
- 1973: My Friend Paul
- 1974: Ace of Aces
- 1975: Son of Silver
- 1976: Full of Hope
- 1977: Mittainvilliers
- 1978: Mad Captain
- 1979: Fils Prodigue
- 1980: Rostov

* The 1942 race was a dead-heat and has joint winners.

== See also ==
- List of French flat horse races
