= Shadwell Racing =

Thoroughbred horse racing operation

Coordinates: 38.030°N 84.633°W

- Type: Thoroughbred Racing Stable, Stud farm
- Key people: Sheikh Hamdan bin Rashid Al Maktoum
- Website: www.shadwellfarm.com; www.derrinstown.com; www.shadwellstud.co.uk

Shadwell Racing is the Thoroughbred horse racing operation founded by Sheikh Hamdan bin Rashid Al Maktoum, the Deputy Ruler of Dubai, United Arab Emirates. It has been operated by his daughter, Sheikha Hissa, since his death in 2021.

Sheikh Hamdan was introduced to Thoroughbred flat racing as a student in the United Kingdom and established his first racing stable there in 1981. He invested heavily in both racing and breeding, and acquired major operations in England, Ireland, and the United States.

He once owned eight separate stud farms worldwide containing more than 200 regally bred mares and many top stallions. Six of these farms are in the county of Suffolk, England, three are near Thetford – Nunnery, Melton and Snarehill Studs – along with the Salsabil Stud near Bury St Edmunds, Elmswell Park Stud and Beech House Stud just outside Newmarket. The other two are in Derrinstown Stud near Maynooth, County Kildare, Ireland, and the 3,200-acre Shadwell Farm near Lexington, Kentucky, United States.

The British breeding operation is controlled at the Nunnery Stud. As of 2026, Baaeed, Mohaather, and Mostahdaf are standing at Beech House, while Minzaal and Awtaad are at Derrinstown. In the past, stallions such as Green Desert, Nashwan, Unfuwain, Haafhd, Nayef, Sakhee, Eqtidaar, Muharaar, Mukhadaram, Tasleet, Haatef, Markaz and Tamayuz stood at Shadwell farms. Beech House Stud is used as a base for Shadwell's private mares, both Thoroughbred and Arabian. The paddocks are also used to winter the private Arabian young stock before they are broken in at Snarehill. Elmswell Park Stud and Salsabil Stud are located deep in the Suffolk countryside. These operations together look after Sheikh Hamdan's private mares. Here, mares are cared for prior to foaling. Once they have foaled, they stay until returning to Ireland with their foals in late summer. Snarehill Stud is used as a base for breaking in the young Thoroughbreds. It is also used for rest and rehabilitation for horses in training. Finally, there is Melton Paddocks, originally the public stud before the building of the Nunnery Stud, but now it houses the Arabian stallions.

Shadwell Farm was built in Kentucky in 1985. Mohaymen, Qurbaan, and Tamarkuz once stood at the farm's stallion division at Nashwan Stud.

This investment have translated to great success on the racetrack. He was the British flat racing Champion Owner in 1990, 1995, 2002, and 2005. He has enjoyed over 50 Group 1 wins in Europe in addition to race success in America, Australia, and Dubai. His leading horses have ranged from sprinting champions such as Dayjur and Hamas, champion milers like Lahib and Bahri, to middle-distance runners such as Nashwan, Unfuwain, Haafhd, Nayef, Jazil and Invasor. This is in addition to racing several classic-winning fillies who have gone on to be broodmares. The most famous was Salsabil, who won the Epsom Oaks and beat the colts in the Irish Derby. Shadwell's most popular broodmare is Height of Fashion, who was sold by Queen Elizabeth II to Sheikh Hamdan Al-Maktoum after setting a new course record in the Princess of Wales' Stakes. She was the dam of Nashwan, Nayef, and Unfuwain. She is also the granddam of Ghanaati through her daughter Sarayir.

In England, he had approximately 200 horses in training spread across over a number of trainers including Michael Stoute, Owen Burrows, John Gosden, William Haggas, Marcus Tregoning, Ed Dunlop, and Mark Johnston. In the past, he sent horses to Dick Hern, Michael Jarvis, Barry Hills, Alec Stewart, John Dunlop, and Harry Thomson Jones. In Ireland, he sent his horses for many years to Kevin Prendergrast and Dermot Weld, and likewise in France to Freddy Head. In the United States, Kiaran McLaughlin is a trainer for Sheikh Hamdan's stable. David A. Hayes conditions horses for the sheikh in Australia. In the UAE, American trainer Doug Watson is responsible for the sheikh's runners at the Dubai Carnival.

In England, he had Jim Crowley as his retained jockey. In the 1980s and 1990s, Willie Carson won big races for Shadwell on Nashwan and Salsabil.

In late 2005, his Shadwell Stable acquired the Argentina-bred and Uruguay-owned racehorse Invasor and brought him to race in the United States. Invasor won several major graded stakes races, including the 2006 Breeders' Cup Classic and was voted the U.S. Horse of the Year and ranked No. 1 in the World Thoroughbred Racehorse Rankings. He won the Dubai World Cup but was retired in June 2007 following a non-life-threatening training injury and now stands as a stallion at Shadwell Farm in Kentucky. Shadwell Stables won the Eclipse Award for Outstanding Owner of 2007 thanks to the efforts of Invasor and leading filly Lahudood.

== Major international racing wins ==
United Kingdom

- 2,000 Guineas:
  - Nashwan (1989)
  - Haafhd (2004)
- Epsom Derby:
  - Nashwan (1989)
  - Erhaab (1994)
- 1,000 Guineas:
  - Salsabil (1990)
  - Shadayid (1991)
  - Harayir (1995)
  - Lahan (2000)
  - Ghanaati (2009)
- Epsom Oaks:
  - Salsabil (1990)
  - Eswarah (2005)
  - Taghrooda (2014)
- St. James's Palace Stakes:
  - Marju (1991)
  - Bahri (1995)
- Coronation Stakes:
  - Al Bahathri (1985)
  - Ghanaati (2009)
- Queen Anne Stakes:
  - Lahib (1992)
- Prince of Wales's Stakes:
  - Muhtarram (1994 & 1995)
  - Nayef (2003)
  - Mostahdaf (2023)
- Ascot Gold Cup:
  - Ashal (1990)
- Eclipse Stakes:
  - Nashwan (1989)
  - Elmaamul (1990)
  - Mukhadram (2014)
- Falmouth Stakes:
  - Al Bahathri (1985)
  - Alshakr (2000)
  - Tashawak (2002)
  - Nazeef (2020)
- King George VI and Queen Elizabeth Stakes:
  - Nashwan (1989)
  - Taghrooda (2014)
  - Hukum (2023)
- Sussex Stakes:
  - Mohaather (2020)
  - Baaeed (2022)
- Lockinge Stakes:
  - Baaeed (2022)
- International Stakes:
  - Nayef (2002)
  - Baaeed (2022)
  - Mostahdaf (2023)
- Queen Elizabeth II Stakes:
  - Lahib (1992)
  - Maroof (1994)
  - Bahri (1995)
- Champion Stakes:
  - Nayef (2001)
  - Haafhd (2004)
  - Anmaat (2024)
- King's Stand Stakes:
  - Dayjur (1990)
  - Battaash (2020)
- Golden Jubilee Stakes:
  - Atraf (1996)
  - Malhub (2002)
  - Almeraq (2026)
- July Cup:
  - Hamas (1993)
  - Elnadim (1998)
  - Muhaarar (2015)
- Nunthorpe Stakes:
  - Dayjur (1990)
- Haydock Sprint Cup:
  - Dayjur (1990)
  - Minzaal (2022)
  - Almeraq (2026)
- Dewhurst Stakes:
  - Alhaarth (1995)
  - Mujahid (1998)
- Middle Park Stakes:
  - Fard (1994)
  - Hayil (1997)
  - Awzaan (2009)
- Racing Post Trophy:
  - Al Hareb (1988)
- Lowther Stakes:
  - Al Bahathri (1984)
- Fillies' Mile:
  - Aqaarid (1994)
- Nassau Stakes:
  - Al Husn (2003)
- Queen Elizabeth II Jubilee Stakes:
  - Almeraq (2026)

Ireland

- Irish Derby:
  - Salsabil (1990)
- Irish 2,000 Guineas:
  - Awtaad (2016)
- Irish 1,000 Guineas:
  - Al Bahathri (1985)
  - Mehthaaf (1994)
  - Matiya (1996)
  - Bethrah (2010)
- Irish Champion Stakes:
  - Elmaamul (1990)
  - Muhtarram (1993)

France

- Poule d'Essai des Pouliches:
  - Ta Rib (1996)
- Prix Jean Prat:
  - Tamayuz (2008)
- Prix Jacques Le Marois:
  - Tamayuz (2008)
- Prix du Moulin de Longchamp:
  - Aqlaam (2009)
  - Baaeed (2021)
- Prix de l'Abbaye de Longchamp:
  - Dayjur (1990)
- Prix Vermeille:
  - Salsabil (1990)
- Prix Jean-Luc Lagardère:
  - Naaqoos (2008)
- Prix Morny:
  - Arcano (2009)
- Prix Marcel Boussac:
  - Ashayer (1987)
  - Salsabil (1989)
  - Shadayid (1990)
- Prix d'Ispahan:
  - Anmaat (2023)

Australia

- Melbourne Cup:
  - At Talaq (1986)
  - Jeune (1994)
- Caulfield Cup:
  - Tawqeet (2006)
- Blue Diamond Stakes:
  - Nadeem (2006)

United Arab Emirates

- Dubai World Cup:
  - Almutawakel (1999)
  - Invasor (2007)
- Dubai Duty Free Stakes:
  - Altibr (1999)
- Dubai Sheema Classic:
  - Nayef (2002)
- Godolphin Mile:
  - Tereshkova (1996)
  - Tamarkuz (2015)
- Dubai Golden Shaheen:
  - Atraf (1997)
- Al Quoz Sprint:
  - Danyah (2023)

United States

- Belmont Stakes:
  - Jazil (2006)
- Breeders' Cup Classic:
  - Invasor (2006)
- Metropolitan Handicap:
  - Frosted (2016)
- Pimlico Special:
  - Invasor (2006)
- Suburban Handicap:
  - Invasor (2006)
- Whitney Handicap:
  - Invasor (2006)
  - Frosted (2016)
- Donn Handicap:
  - Invasor (2007)
  - Albertus Maximus (2009)
- Breeders Cup Dirt Mile:
  - Tamarkuz (2016)
- Breeders' Cup Filly & Mare Turf:
  - Lahudood (2007)
- Flower Bowl Invitational Stakes:
  - Lahudood (2007)
- Queen Elizabeth II Challenge Cup Stakes:
  - Alwajeeha (2008)
