= Anabaa Blue =

British-bred Thoroughbred racehorse

- Sire: Anabaa
- Grandsire: Danzig
- Dam: Allez Les Trois
- Damsire: Riverman
- Sex: Stallion
- Foaled: 12 April 1998
- Country: United Kingdom
- Colour: Bay
- Breeder: Haras d'Etreham & M3 Elevage
- Owner: Charles Mimouni
- Trainer: Carlos Lerner
- Record: 14: 4-3-2
- Earnings: £522,939

Major wins
- Prix Noailles (2001); Prix du Jockey Club (2001); Grand Prix de Chantilly (2002)

Anabaa Blue (foaled 12 April 1998) is a British-bred, French-trained Thoroughbred racehorse and sire. He was sired by the sprinter Anabaa out of Allez Les Trois, a mare with a very strong middle-distance pedigree. Between September 2000 and October 2002 he ran fourteen times and won four races. After showing moderate ability in two races as a juvenile he showed marked improvement in the following spring. After winning a minor stakes race on his debut, he won the Prix Noailles, finished a close second in the Prix Lupin and then recorded his most significant victory in the Prix du Jockey Club. He was beaten in his three remaining races as a three-year-old, but returned in the following year to win the Grand Prix de Chantilly and finish second in the Prix Foy. He was retired to stud at the end of his four-year-old season and has had some success as a sire of winners.

== Background ==
Anabaa Blue is a bay horse with no white markings bred in the United Kingdom by the French breeders Haras d'Etreham. He was from the first crop of foals sired by Anabaa, the European Champion Sprinter on 1996. Anabaa went on to sire the outstanding racemare Goldikova and the Hong Kong Cup winner Precision. Anabaa Blue was the second foal of his dam Allez Les Trois, who won three races including the Prix de Flore. Allez Les Trois was a half-sister to the 2000 Guineas winner King's Best, Urban Sea, a mare who won the Prix de l'Arc de Triomphe and produced both Galileo and Sea the Stars, Turbaine by Trempolino dam of Tertullian by Miswaki and Anzille by Plugged Nickle dam of Anzillero by Law Society.

In August 1999, the yearling was consigned to the Deauville sale and was bought for ₣650,000 by Charles Mimouni. He was sent into training with the Argentinian-born Carlos Lerner at Maisons-Laffitte and was ridden in all but one of his races by the Belgian jockey Christophe Soumillon.

== Racing career ==
=== 2000: two-year-old season ===
Anabaa Blue began his racing career by finishing third in a maiden race over 1600 metres at Chantilly Racecourse on 15 September. A month later he appeared in the Prix de Blaison over the same distance at Longchamp Racecourse and finished third again, beaten three quarters of a length and one and a half lengths by Leger and Technicolor Lover.

=== 2001: three-year-old season ===
Anabaa Blue began his second season in the Prix Aqua Tinte II over 2000 metres on heavy ground at Maisons-Laffitte Racecourse on 2 March. Starting the 8/5 favourite he took the lead approaching the last 200 metres and won easily by three lengths from Art Contemporain. On 8 April, the colt was moved up in class for the Group Two Prix Noailles (a trial race for the Prix du Jockey Club) run over 2200 metres at Longchamp and was made favourite against five opponents. He led from the start, went clear of his opponents in the closing stages and won by six lengths from Gris de Fer with the Zetland Stakes winner Worthily two lengths back in third. Lerner commented "We've always thought a lot of Anabaa Blue and now he's proved himself to be one of the best in France. The main target is the Jockey-Club. He has taken time to come to himself and has done well during the winter. I think he will be just as good on better ground". The colt was stepped up in class again for the Group One Prix Lupin and started odds-on favourite ahead of the Critérium de Maisons-Laffitte winner Amiwain, the Aidan O'Brien-trained Milan and the Royal Lodge Stakes winner Atlantis Prince. He took the lead 400 metres from the finish but was overtaken by the outsider Chichicastenango and beaten a head, with Milan a neck away in third.

On 3 June, Anabaa Blue started at odds of 8.6/1 in a field of fourteen colts for 164th running of the Prix du Jockey Club over 2400 metres at Chantilly. Chichicastenango, Milan and Art Contemporain were again in opposition, but the favourite was Maille Pistol, who had won his last four races including the Prix Greffulhe and the Prix Hocquart. The other contenders included Sensible (Prix de Suresnes), Sagacity (Critérium de Saint-Cloud), Okawango (Grand Critérium) and Doctorate (Prix de l'Avre). Soumillon (riding on the eve of his 21st birthday) sent the colt into an early lead before settling in second place behind Maille Pistol. Anabaa Blue regained the lead 300 metres from the finish and was driven out to prevail in a blanket finish, beating Chichicastenango by half a length ahead of Grandera, Okawango, Milan and Foundation Spirit. After the race, an emotional Soumillon said "This is the best day of my life. Anabaa Blue was a bit unlucky in the Prix Lupin and he fully deserves the red badge of courage. This was Anabaa Blue's day and he fully deserved it".

Anabaa Blue was sent to England to contest Britain's most prestigious weight-for-age race, the King George VI and Queen Elizabeth Stakes over one and a half miles at Ascot Racecourse on 28 July. He started an 18/1 outsider and finished seventh of the twelve runners behind Galileo. After a seven-week break, the colt returned in the Prix Niel (a trial race for the Prix de l'Arc de Triomphe) at Longchamp on 16 September. He led from the start but was overtaken 300 metres from the finish and beaten three quarters of a length by the British-trained favourite Golan, with Chichicastenango two lengths away in third. On his final appearance of the season, Anabaa Blue started at odds of 11.2/1 for the Prix de l'Arc de Triomphe on 7 October. He reached third place in the straight but faded in the closing stages and finished ninth of the seventeen runners behind Sakhee.

=== 2002: four-year-old season ===
On his first appearance as a four-year-old, Anabaa Blue contested the Group One Prix Ganay at Longchamp over 2100 metres on 28 April. He led until 400 metres out but faded to finish fifth of the six runners behind the filly Aquarelliste. Six weeks later the colt contested the Group Two Grand Prix de Chantilly over 2400 metres for which he started 7/2 second favourite behind Califet, a colt who had won the Prix d'Hédouville and the Prix Jean de Chaudenay in his last two races. The other runners included St Expedit (twice winner of the Ormonde Stakes), Jomana (Prix Exbury, Prix Corrida) and Sangreal (Prix Ridgway). Anabaa Blue raced just behind the leaders before moving forward in the straight where Soumillon briefly struggled to obtain a clear run. He took the lead 150 metres from the finish and won by one and a half lengths from St Expedit and Ange Gabriel, who dead-heated for second place. Ange Gabriel's jockey Thierry Jarnet lodged an objection, but the racecourse stewards confirmed the result after an inquiry. After the race Lerner aid "I didn't have him 100 per cent for this race. I put a cross noseband on him and he relaxed much more during the race... he just loves Chantilly" whilst Soumillon commented "The horse is back to his form of last year and I still had something in the tank. He relaxed so well and didn't have a hard race".

In the Grand Prix de Saint-Cloud three weeks later he started second favourite but never looked likely to win and finished fifth of the six runners behind Ange Gabriel. After a two and a half month break, Anabaa Blue returned for the Prix Foy at Longchamp in September. Starting at odds of 5.9/1 he had trouble getting a clear run in the closing stages but finished strongly to take second place, a length behind Aquarelliste and a short head in front of the Italian colt Falbrav. On October 6, the colt ran in the Prix de l'Arc de Triomphe for the second time. He started a 23/1 outsider and finished seventh of the sixteen runners, four and quarter lengths behind the winner Marienbard.

== Stud record ==
Anabaa Blue was retired from racing to become a breeding stallion. In 2015 he was standing at the Haras du Grand Chesnaie at a fee of €2,500. The best of his progeny to date has been Spirit One, who won the Arlington Million in 2008. Other winners sired by Anabaa Blue include Zinabaa (Prix du Muguet, Prix Daniel Wildenstein), Tres Bleu (Prix de Reux, Grand Prix de Deauville) and Tres Rapide (disqualified "winner" of the Grosser Preis der Badischen Unternehmen).

== Pedigree ==
Pedigree of Anabaa Blue (GB), bay stallion, 1998
Sire Anabaa (USA) 1992	Danzig (USA); 1977	Northern Dancer	Nearctic
Sire Anabaa (USA) 1992	Danzig (USA); 1977	Northern Dancer	Natalma
Sire Anabaa (USA) 1992	Danzig (USA); 1977	Pas De Nom	Admiral's Voyage
Sire Anabaa (USA) 1992	Danzig (USA); 1977	Pas De Nom	Petitioner
Sire Anabaa (USA) 1992	Balbonella (FR); 1984	Gay Mecene	Vaguely Noble
Sire Anabaa (USA) 1992	Balbonella (FR); 1984	Gay Mecene	Gay Missile
Sire Anabaa (USA) 1992	Balbonella (FR); 1984	Bamieres	Riverman
Sire Anabaa (USA) 1992	Balbonella (FR); 1984	Bamieres	Bergamasque
Dam Allez Les Trois (USA) 1991	Riverman (USA); 1969	Never Bend	Nasrullah
Dam Allez Les Trois (USA) 1991	Riverman (USA); 1969	Never Bend	Lalun
Dam Allez Les Trois (USA) 1991	Riverman (USA); 1969	River Lady	Prince John
Dam Allez Les Trois (USA) 1991	Riverman (USA); 1969	River Lady	Nile Lily
Dam Allez Les Trois (USA) 1991	Allegretta (GB); 1978	Lombard	Agio
Dam Allez Les Trois (USA) 1991	Allegretta (GB); 1978	Lombard	Promised Lady
Dam Allez Les Trois (USA) 1991	Allegretta (GB); 1978	Anatevka	Espresso
Dam Allez Les Trois (USA) 1991	Allegretta (GB); 1978	Anatevka	Almyra (Family 9-h)

- Anabaa Blue was inbred 2 x 4 to Riverman, meaning that this stallion appears in both the second and fourth generations of his pedigree.
