= Treve (horse) =

French-bred Thoroughbred racehorse

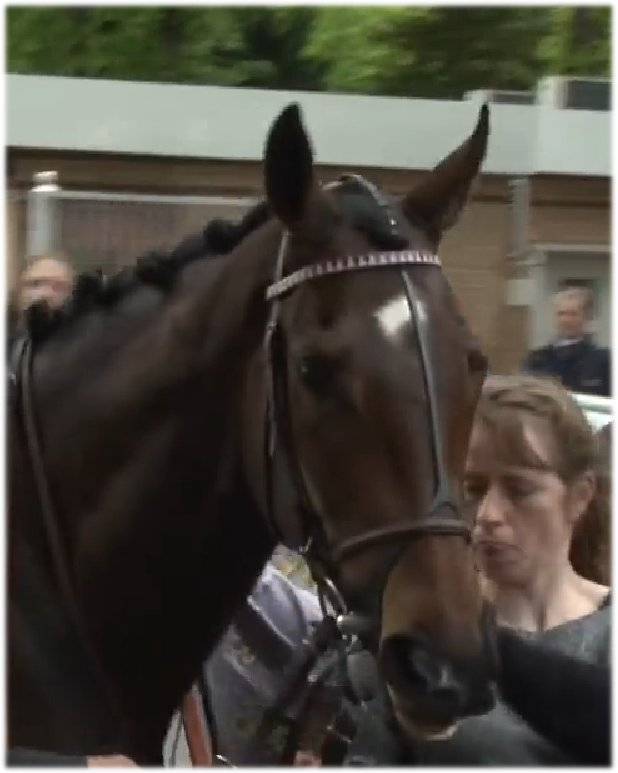
- Treve before the 2014 Prix Ganay
- Breed: Thoroughbred
- Sire: Motivator
- Grandsire: Montjeu
- Dam: Trevise
- Damsire: Anabaa
- Sex: Filly
- Foaled: 7 April 2010
- Country: France
- Colour: Bay
- Breeder: Haras du Quesnay
- Owner: Haras du Quesnay; Sheikh Joaan al Thani; Al Shaqab Racing
- Trainer: Criquette Head-Maarek
- Jockey: Thierry Jarnet; Frankie Dettori
- Record: 13: 9-1-1
- Earnings: £6,002,918

Major wins
- Prix de Diane (2013); Prix Vermeille (2013, 2015); Prix de l'Arc de Triomphe (2013, 2014); Prix Corrida (2015); Grand Prix de Saint-Cloud (2015)

Awards
- Cartier Horse of the Year (2013); Cartier Champion Three-year-old Filly (2013); Timeform rating: 134

Treve (French: Trêve, foaled 7 April 2010) is a French Thoroughbred racehorse who was the 2013 European Horse of the Year after being unbeaten in four races as a three-year-old. These included the Prix de Diane, Prix Vermeille and Prix de l'Arc de Triomphe.

As a two-year-old she won her only race, while aged four she was beaten in her first three races before winning the Arc for a second time. In her final campaign aged five, the mare recorded further top-class successes.

== Background ==
Bred by Haras du Quesnay and foaled on 7 April 2010, Treve is a dark-coated bay filly with a small white star. She was sired by Motivator, who won The Derby in 2005. He is now a stallion at Haras du Quesnay and has also sired Prix de l'Opéra winner Ridasiyna. Treve's dam, Trevise, is a daughter of Anabaa. Treve is trained by Criquette Head-Maarek. Treve was planned to be sold in an auction but, as no one bid, she was re-purchased by her breeder for 22,000 Euro.

== Racing career ==
=== 2012: Two-year-old season ===
Treve raced once as a two-year-old, winning a 1600-metre maiden race at Longchamp by one and a half lengths in September 2012.

=== 2013: Three-year-old season ===
Treve's first race as a three-year-old was the Prix Perruche Bleue on 15 May 2013 at Saint-Cloud. She won the race, finishing three and a half lengths in front of the odds-on favourite Bayargal (who was later disqualified). One month later, Treve was one of eleven runners in the Prix de Diane. Among her opponents were Poule d'Essai des Pouliches winner Flotilla and runner-up Esoterique, as well as Prix Saint-Alary winner Silasol. As with her first two races, Treve was ridden by Thierry Jarnet, who placed her near the rear of the field in the early stages of the race. Nearing the end of the race, she closed the gap to the leaders quickly and took the lead with about 300 metres left to run. Treve pulled away from the field to win by four lengths from Chicquita. After her win in the Prix de Diane, Treve was purchased by Sheikh Joaan al Thani.

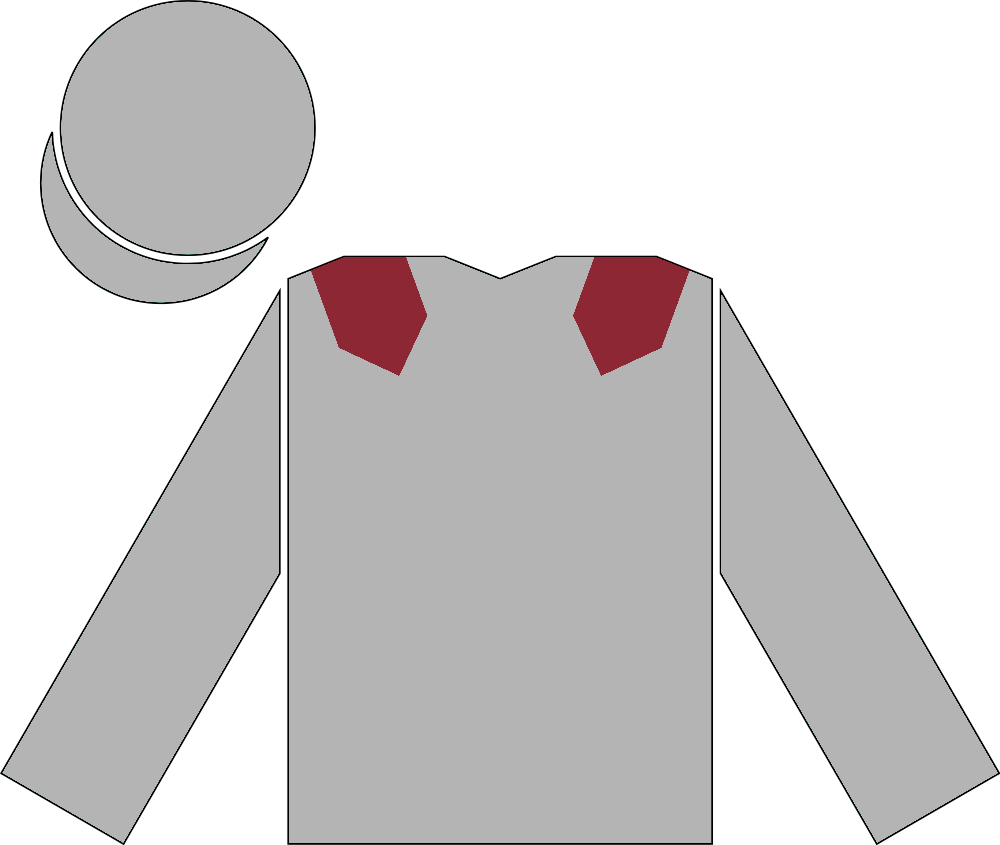
Racing colours of Sheikh Joaan al Thani and Al Shaqab Racing

On 15 September 2013, in the Prix Vermeille, she was ridden for the first time by Frankie Dettori and faced Group 1 winners Silasol and Romantica, along with seven others. She won the race by one and three quarter lengths from Wild Coco, with Tasaday a further three and a half lengths back in third place. After the race, Treve was immediately cut in price for the Prix de l'Arc de Triomphe. Commenting on the filly having to come from a poor position entering the finishing straight, trainer Criquette Head-Maarek said: "My heart was beating because she found herself badly positioned and she pulled but she had a lot of speed and a lot of class."

Treve started second favourite for the 92nd running of the Prix de l'Arc de Triomphe at Longchamp on 6 October 2013. The field was a strong one, including Orfevre, Ruler of the World, Kizuna, Intello, Al Kazeem and Leading Light. Treve was ridden by Thierry Jarnet as Frankie Dettori had broken his ankle in a fall at Nottingham Racecourse. Treve sweated up badly before the race and started poorly. She made ground rapidly on the outside and took the lead in the straight before accelerating clear of the field to win by five lengths from Orfevre and Intello.

In November, Treve was voted Champion Three-year-old Filly and Horse of the Year at the Cartier Racing Awards, beating Sky Lantern into second place in both polls.

=== 2014: four-year-old season ===
Treve stayed in training as a four-year-old, and her first race of the season came in the Prix Ganay on 27 April 2014, where she faced seven rivals, including the multiple Group 1 winner Cirrus des Aigles. After being held up near the rear of the field in the early stages of the race, Treve joined leader Cirrus des Aigles with about 400 metres still to run. The two horses remained together until the finish, with Cirrus des Aigles winning by a short neck, and the pair being four and a half lengths clear of third-placed Norse King. In June, Treve raced outside France for the first time when she started 8/13 favourite for the Prince of Wales's Stakes at Royal Ascot. She raced in sixth place before moving up into second place in the straight but could make no further progress and finished third, beaten one and three quarter lengths and a length by The Fugue and Magician.

In September, Treve attempted to repeat her 2013 success in the Prix Vermeille and started the 4/5 favourite. She raced in last place before moving to the outside to make her challenge in the straight but was unable to reach the leaders and finished fourth behind the 22/1 outsider Baltic Baroness. After three consecutive defeats, Treve was not considered one of the leading contenders for the 2014 running of the Prix de l'Arc de Triomphe on 5 October and started at odds of 14.4/1. The twenty runner field did not have an outstanding favourite, but included many major winners including Taghrooda, Avenir Certain, Harp Star, Ectot, Just A Way, Ruler of the World, Gold Ship, Kingston Hill and Al Kazeem. Treve pulled hard in the early stages before establishing a good position just behind the leaders on the rail. When the field fanned out on the final turn, she accelerated into the lead on the inside and quickly went clear. She never appeared to be in danger of defeat thereafter and won by two lengths from the André Fabre-trained Flintshire, with Taghrooda taking third ahead of Kingston Hill.

=== 2015: five-year-old season ===
Treve began her five-year-old campaign in the Group Two Prix Corrida at Saint-Cloud on 29 May. Starting the 4/9 favourite, she took the lead entering the last 200 metres and accelerated clear of her opponents to win by four lengths from the Prix de l'Opéra winner We Are. Head-Maarek commented "Today she was at 80 per cent. In the Grand Prix de Saint-Cloud she will be at 100 per cent... and the Arc, I hope she will be at 200 per cent!" On 28 June the mare contested the Grand Prix de Saint-Cloud and was made the 3/5 favourite against eight opponents including Flintshire and the Dubai Sheema Classic winner Dolniya. She stayed on strongly in the straight to overtake Flintshire 150 metres from the finish and won by one and a quarter lengths.

Treve again prepared for a run in the Arc by contesting the Prix Vermeille on 13 September. On this occasion her opposition was headed by the Prix Minerve winner Candarliya and the British filly Arabian Queen as well as the Pretty Polly Stakes winner Diamondsandrubies from Ireland. Jarnet tracked the leaders before sending the mare into the lead 400 metres from the finish. She accelerated away from her rival to win by four and a half lengths from Candarliya. In October the mare attempted to become the first horse to win the Arc for a third time and started 9/10 favourite ahead of the three-year-old colts New Bay and Golden Horn. After being restrained by Jarnet in the early stages before moving up on the outside in the straight. She hung to the right and never looked likely to win but made steady progress to finish fourth behind Golden Horn, Flintshire and New Bay.

== Pedigree ==
Pedigree of Treve, bay filly, 2010
Sire Motivator (GB) b. 2002	Montjeu (IRE) b. 1996	Sadler's Wells b. 1981	Northern Dancer*
Sire Motivator (GB) b. 2002	Montjeu (IRE) b. 1996	Sadler's Wells b. 1981	Fairy Bridge
Sire Motivator (GB) b. 2002	Montjeu (IRE) b. 1996	Floripedes b. 1985	Top Ville
Sire Motivator (GB) b. 2002	Montjeu (IRE) b. 1996	Floripedes b. 1985	Toute Cy
Sire Motivator (GB) b. 2002	Out West b. 1994	Gone West b. 1984	Mr. Prospector
Sire Motivator (GB) b. 2002	Out West b. 1994	Gone West b. 1984	Secrettame
Sire Motivator (GB) b. 2002	Out West b. 1994	Chellingoua b. 1983	Sharpen Up
Sire Motivator (GB) b. 2002	Out West b. 1994	Chellingoua b. 1983	Uncommitted
Dam Trevise (FR) b. 2000	Anabaa (USA) b. 1992	Danzig b. 1977	Northern Dancer*
Dam Trevise (FR) b. 2000	Anabaa (USA) b. 1992	Danzig b. 1977	Pas de Nom
Dam Trevise (FR) b. 2000	Anabaa (USA) b. 1992	Balbonella b. 1984	Gay Mecene
Dam Trevise (FR) b. 2000	Anabaa (USA) b. 1992	Balbonella b. 1984	Bamieres
Dam Trevise (FR) b. 2000	Trevillari b. 1987	Riverman b. 1969	Never Bend
Dam Trevise (FR) b. 2000	Trevillari b. 1987	Riverman b. 1969	River Lady
Dam Trevise (FR) b. 2000	Trevillari b. 1987	Trevilla b. 1981	Lyphard
Dam Trevise (FR) b. 2000	Trevillari b. 1987	Trevilla b. 1981	Trillion

Note: b. = Bay

* Treve is inbred 4x4 to Northern Dancer, meaning that the stallion appears twice in the fourth generation of her pedigree.

== Fly Away Treve – song ==
To accompany Trêve in her quest for an historic third victory in the Prix de l'Arc de Triomphe, a song "Fly Away Treve" was released in September 2015. Lyrics and vocals by Dan Mitrecy, music by Dominique Cotten.
