= Cathedral Stakes =

Flat horse race in Britain

Cathedral Stakes
2026
Almeraq	Spy Chief	Soldier's Tree

Previous years
2025
Fair Angellica	Zoum Zoum	Annaf
2024
Raqiya	Funny Story	Mister Sketch
2023
Run To Freedom	Marbaan	Khaadem
2022
Benefit	Nahaarr	Edraak
2021
Line Of Departure	Khaadem	Cairn Gorm

2020-2011
2020
Lyzbeth	Bungee Jump	Wise Counsel
2019
Archer's Dream	Snazzy Jazzy	Richenza
2018
Cardsharp	Dancing Star	Mythmaker
2017
Eqtiraan	Mythmaker	Pixeleen
2016
Don't Touch	Danzeno	Watchable
2015
Absolutely So	Justineo	Minalisa
2014
Indignant	Professor	Valonia
2013
Professor	Justineo	Miss Lahar
2012
Libranno	Our Jonathan	Definightly
2011
Elnawin	High Standing	Border Patrol

2010-2002
2010
Sir Gerry	Elnawin	Angel's Pursuit
2009
Judd Street	Palace Moon	Spanish Bounty
2008
Edge Closer	Borderlescott	Ashdown Express
2007
Sakhee's Secret	Prime Defender	Presto Shinko
2006
Etlaala	Philharmonic	Pivotal Flame
2005
Leitrim House	Yomalo	Royal Storm
2004
Moss Vale	Mac Love	Kings Point
2003
Avonbridge	Ashdown Express	Resplendent Cee
2002
Palace Affair	Grey Eminence	Ashdown Express

The Cathedral Stakes is a listed flat horse race in Great Britain open to horses aged three years or older. It is run at Salisbury over a distance of 6 furlongs (1,206 metres), and it is scheduled to take place each year in late May.

The race was first run in 2002. Prior to 2023 it was run in mid-June.

== Records ==
Leading jockey (4 wins):

- Richard Hughes – Edge Closer (2008), Elnawin (2011), Libranno (2012), Professor (2013)

Leading trainer (4 wins):

- Richard Hannon Sr. – Edge Closer (2008), Elnawin (2011), Libranno (2012), Professor (2013)

== Winners ==
Year	Winner	Age	Jockey	Trainer	Time
2002	Palace Affair	4	Stephen Carson	Toby Balding	1:15.45
2003	Avonbridge	3	Steve Drowne	Roger Charlton	1:12.31
2004	Moss Vale	3	Michael Hills	Barry Hills	1:11.85
2005	Leitrim House	4	Jimmy Fortune	Brian Meehan	1:15.42
2006	Etlaala	4	Richard Hills	Barry Hills	1:12.98
2007	Sakhee's Secret	3	Steve Drowne	Hughie Morrison	1:12.59
2008	Edge Closer	4	Richard Hughes	Richard Hannon Sr.	1:13.45
2009	Judd Street	7	Dane O'Neill	Eve Johnson Houghton	1:12.24
2010	Sir Gerry	5	Robert Winston	John Best	1:12.55
2011	Elnawin	5	Richard Hughes	Richard Hannon Sr.	1:15.17
2012	Libranno	4	Richard Hughes	Richard Hannon Sr.	1:14.49
2013	Professor	3	Richard Hughes	Richard Hannon Sr.	1:13.19
2014	Indignant	4	Pat Dobbs	Richard Hannon Jr.	1:11.81
2015	Absolutely So	5	David Probert	Andrew Balding	1:12.88
2016	Don't Touch	4	Tony Hamilton	Richard Fahey	1:13.93
2017	Eqtiraan	3	Jim Crowley	Richard Hannon Jr.	1:11.76
2018	Cardsharp	3	Silvestre de Sousa	Mark Johnston	1:12.85
2019 (dh)	Snazzy Jazzy; Archer's Dream	4; 3	Adam Kirby; George Wood	Clive Cox; James Fanshawe	1:14.87
2020 (Note: The 2020 race was run at Goodwood due to the COVID-19 pandemic in the United Kingdom)	Lyzbeth	4	Oisin Murphy	Martyn Meade	1:10.03
2021	Line Of Departure	3	David Egan	Roger Varian	1:13.73
2022	Benefit	3	John Fahy	Clive Cox	1:13.59
2023	Run To Freedom	5	Trevor Whelan	Henry Candy	1:11.31
2024	Raqiya	3	Trevor Whelan	Owen Burrows	1:13.56
2025	Fair Angellica	4	Finley Marsh	Richard Hughes	1:11.28
2026	Almeraq	4	Harry Davies	William Haggas	1:13.56

== See also ==
- Horse racing in Great Britain
- List of British flat horse races
