= Motivator (horse) =

British-bred Thoroughbred racehorse (2002–2026)

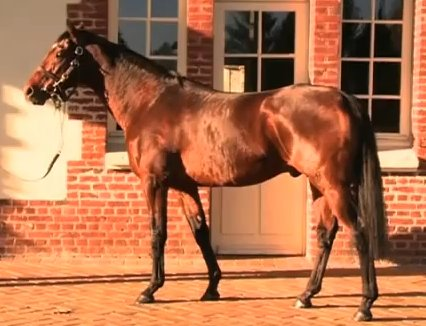
- Breed: Thoroughbred
- Sire: Montjeu (IRE)
- Grandsire: Sadler's Wells (USA)
- Dam: Out West (USA)
- Damsire: Gone West (USA)
- Sex: Stallion
- Foaled: 22 February 2002
- Died: 3 July 2026 (aged 24)
- Country: Great Britain
- Colour: Bay
- Breeder: Deerfield Farm
- Owner: Royal Ascot Racing Club
- Trainer: Michael Bell
- Record: 7: 4-2-0
- Earnings: £1,192,457

Major wins
- Racing Post Trophy (2004); Dante Stakes (2005); Epsom Derby (2005)

Awards
- BHB Horse of the Year (2005); BHB Champion Three-Year-Old Colt (2005); Leading sire in France (2013); Timeform rating: 131
- Last updated on 29 July 2022

Motivator (22 February 2002 – 3 July 2026) was a British Thoroughbred racehorse and active sire. In a racing career which lasted from August 2004 until October 2005, he ran seven times and won four races. He is best known as the winner of the 2005 Epsom Derby. He was retired to stud, where he sired the dual Prix de l'Arc de Triomphe winner Treve.

== Background ==
Motivator was a bay horse with a white star bred by Salah M. Fustok's Deerfield Farm in Dullingham, Cambridgeshire.

He was purchased at the 2003 Tattersalls October Yearling sale for 75,000 gns by the bloodstock agent John Warren on behalf of the Royal Ascot Racing Club, a partnership whose 230 members included television personality, Simon Cowell.

Motivator was one on many top-class middle-distance horses and stayers sired by Montjeu. Others include the Derby winners Authorized and Pour Moi, the St Leger winners Scorpion and Masked Marvel and the Prix de l'Arc de Triomphe winner Hurricane Run. Motivator, Hurricane Run and Scorpion were all from Montjeu's first crop of foals, and were important in establishing him as a sire. Motivator is out of the American-bred mare Out West, making him a half-brother of the Hardwicke Stakes winner Macarthur, and the Listed race winner Imperial Star.

Motivator died on 3 July 2026, aged 24.

== Racing career ==
=== 2004: two-year-old season ===
Motivator began his racing career in August 2004 when he contested an eleven-runner maiden race at Newmarket He made an immediate impact with what the Racing Post described as a "scintillating" performance. Ridden by Kieren Fallon, he took the lead a furlong from the finish and pulled away to win by six lengths. After the race, his trainer demonstrated his confidence by naming the Group Two Royal Lodge Stakes at Ascot as the colt's most likely next race.

Motivator was ruled out of the Ascot race because of the unsuitably firm ground, which meant that he had been off the racecourse for more than two months before being stepped up markedly in class to contest the Group One Racing Post Trophy at Doncaster. Despite his lack of experience he was made 6/4 favourite ahead of the Aidan O'Brien-trained Albert Hall, the winner of the Beresford Stakes. Fallon sent Motivator into the lead well over two furlongs out, and the colt stayed on strongly to beat Albert Hall by two and a half lengths, despite hanging slightly to the right in the closing stages. Michael Bell called Motivator "a very, very serious horse", while Fallon described the colt as "A Derby horse if ever there was one".

After the race he was offered at odds of between 10/1 and 16/1 for the following year's Derby, the favourite being the Godolphin colt Dubawi.

=== 2005: three-year-old season ===
==== Spring ====
In 2005, Fallon was no longer available, having been appointed the stable jockey to the Ballydoyle team, and Johnny Murtagh took over as Motivator's regular rider. Motivator was expected by some to run in the 2,000 Guineas but after an important exercise gallop in April, the decision was made to concentrate on middle-distance races. Michael Bell chose to start Motivator's three-year-old campaign with a run in the Dante Stakes at York, for which he was made even-money favourite. The Dante is one of the most important trial races for the Derby, having been won in runnings prior to 2005 by the Epsom winners Erhaab, Benny the Dip and North Light. Motivator was sent into the lead by Murtagh a furlong out, and won "comfortably" although he once again showed his tendency to hang to the right. Bell was satisfied with the result, although he made it clear that the pressure of preparing the "highly-strung" colt had been a constant worry.

Motivator's price for the Derby was cut to as low as 7/4 as a result of his performance. The betting for the race however, was re-arranged after Dubawi won the Irish 2,000 Guineas impressively. Two weeks before the race many bookmakers made Motivator and Dubawi joint-favourites ahead of Aidan O'Brien's Gypsy King, who had won the Chester Vase with Kieren Fallon.

==== Summer ====
Johnny Murtagh rode Motivator again in the Derby, but only after successfully appealing a three-day riding ban which would have ruled him out of the race. Motivator was a well-supported 3/1 favourite for the Derby, ahead Gypsy King at 7/2 and Dubawi at 5/1. Murtagh kept Motivator close to the pace, before making a challenge early in the straight. He immediately quickened past the leader Hattan and drew clear of the field, with Frankie Dettori sending Dubawi in pursuit. Motivator maintained his pace down the straight to win by six lengths from the French colt Walk in the Park, who overtook the fading Dubawi in the closing stages. Murtagh described the win as the easiest of his three Derbies (he had previously won on Sinndar and High Chaparral) and expressed his belief that Motivator could improve further.

Racing colours of Royal Ascot Racing Club

Motivator was regarded as an outstanding Derby winner, with Timeform rating him the best winner since Generous, and he was made 2/5 favourite for his next start in the Eclipse Stakes at Sandown, where his only serious opposition was expected to come from the New Zealand-bred Australian Champion Starcraft. Motivator pulled hard in the early stages, but appeared to be going strongly when taking the lead in the straight. He was unable, however, to pull away from the field as he had done at Epsom and was soon challenged by Kieren Fallon on Oratorio (a colt who had finished only tenth in the Derby). Oratorio overtook Motivator inside the final furlong and won by half a length. Murtagh reported that the colt may not have been suited by the shorter distance and firmer ground, whilst Bell felt that Motivator had not been helped by the "muddling" pace.

==== Autumn ====
After a break of two months, Motivator returned to face a strong field in the Irish Champion Stakes at Leopardstown in which he was ridden by Kevin Darley. His participation in the race had been in doubt as his connections were worried about the ground, which they feared would be unsuitably firm. For the first time since his debut, Motivator did not start favourite, being the 3/1 second choice behind the King George VI and Queen Elizabeth Stakes winner Azamour. Motivator raced prominently and led the field into the straight only to be caught in the final furlong and beaten half a length by Oratorio. While the tactics of the race did not seem to work in the colt's favour (he was forced to lead much earlier than intended), some commentators were expressing the view that he had been rather overrated.

His next race came in October at Longchamp in the 2005 Prix de l'Arc de Triomphe. The return to the longer mile and a half distance was expected to benefit Motivator, and he started 5/2 favourite, just ahead of Hurricane Run at 11/4. The result, however, was much the same as in his previous two races, with Motivator taking the lead, but being unable to hold off challengers in the closing stages. This time he ran on at one pace to finish fifth of the fifteen runners behind Hurricane Run. Following the race a spokesman for the owners described Motivator's performance as a "mystery" and hinted that the colt would probably be retired.

Motivator was however, scheduled to make a final appearance in the Breeders' Cup Turf at Belmont Park and his prospects of winning seemed to have improved when Hurricane Run was withdrawn from the race after "coughing". Shortly before he was due to be flown to America, Motivator was ruled out of the race when he suffered a minor leg injury in training. His retirement was announced immediately.

== Race record ==
Date	Race	Dist (f)	Course	Class	Prize (£K)	Odds	Runners	Placing	Margin	Time	Jockey	Trainer
13 August 2004	Learndirect Maiden Stakes	8	Newmarket July	M	4	3/1	11	1	6	1:41.11	Kieren Fallon	Michael Bell
23 October 2004	Racing Post Trophy	8	Doncaster	1	120	6/4	8	1	2.5	1:41.62	Kieren Fallon	Michael Bell
12 May 2005	Dante Stakes	10.5	York	2	84	Evens	6	1	1.5	2:16.17	Johnny Murtagh	Michael Bell
4 June 2005	Derby	12	Epsom	1	725	3/1	13	1	5	2:35.69	Johnny Murtagh	Michael Bell
2 July 2005	Eclipse Stakes	10	Sandown Park	1	232	2/5	7	2	0.5	2:07.00	Johnny Murtagh	Michael Bell
10 September 2005	Irish Champion Stakes	10	Leopardstown	1	396	3/1	10	2	0.5	2:03.90	Kevin Darley	Michael Bell
2 October 2005	Prix de l'Arc de Triomphe	12	Longchamp	1	729	5/2	15	5	4.25	2:39.92	Johnny Murtagh	Michael Bell

.

== Assessment ==
In the official European Two-year-old Thoroughbred Racehorse Rankings for 2004, Motivator was awarded a figure of 117, making him the sixth best colt in Europe, six pounds behind the champion Shamardal.

In the 2005 World Thoroughbred Racehorse Rankings Motivator was assigned a ranking of 125, making him the best British-trained horse and the fifth best horse in the world, five pounds behind Hurricane Run.

Motivator was named Horse of the Year and Champion three-year-old colt for 2005 by the British Horseracing Board.

== Stud career ==
Motivator stood as a sire at the Royal Studs at Sandringham, Norfolk, where his stallion fee was set at £5,000. His early stud career met with modest success. His first Group race winner has been the May Hill Stakes winner, Pollenator, but the best of his early offspring was probably Hot Prospect, who won a valuable handicap at Haydock in 2010, and has been placed in three Group races. Motivator was unable to cover any mares in 2010, owing to a tendon injury, but made a full recovery.

In October 2012, Motivator had his first Group One winner when the three-year-old filly Ridasiyna won the Prix de l'Opéra at Longchamp. Shortly afterwards, Motivator was transferred to stand at the Haras du Quesnay near Deauville. His stud fee for 2013 was €7,000. On 16 June 2013, Motivator had his biggest success to date when his daughter Treve was a four length winner of the Prix de Diane. Treve went on to win the Prix Vermeille and the Prix de l'Arc de Triomphe in both 2013 and 2014.

Motivator is also a successful damsire in the context of Japanese horse racing, with Titleholder (2021 Kikka Sho, 2022 Tenno Sho (Spring), and 2022 Takarazuka Kinen) and Sol Oriens (2023 Satsuki Sho) both having Motivator as their damsire.

== Pedigree ==
Pedigree of Motivator (GB), bay stallion, 2002
Sire Montjeu (IRE) 1996	Sadler's Wells; 1981	Northern Dancer	Nearctic
Sire Montjeu (IRE) 1996	Sadler's Wells; 1981	Northern Dancer	Natalma
Sire Montjeu (IRE) 1996	Sadler's Wells; 1981	Fairy Bridge	Bold Reason
Sire Montjeu (IRE) 1996	Sadler's Wells; 1981	Fairy Bridge	Special
Sire Montjeu (IRE) 1996	Floripedes; 1985	Top Ville	High Top
Sire Montjeu (IRE) 1996	Floripedes; 1985	Top Ville	Sega Ville
Sire Montjeu (IRE) 1996	Floripedes; 1985	Toute Cy	Tennyson
Sire Montjeu (IRE) 1996	Floripedes; 1985	Toute Cy	Adele Toumignon
Dam Out West (USA) 1994	Gone West; 1984	Mr. Prospector	Raise a Native
Dam Out West (USA) 1994	Gone West; 1984	Mr. Prospector	Gold Digger
Dam Out West (USA) 1994	Gone West; 1984	Secrettame	Secretariat
Dam Out West (USA) 1994	Gone West; 1984	Secrettame	Tamerett
Dam Out West (USA) 1994	Chellingoua; 1983	Sharpen Up	Atan
Dam Out West (USA) 1994	Chellingoua; 1983	Sharpen Up	Rocchetta
Dam Out West (USA) 1994	Chellingoua; 1983	Uncommitted	Buckpasser
Dam Out West (USA) 1994	Chellingoua; 1983	Uncommitted	Lady Be Good (Family: 8-h)
