= Sakhee's Secret =

British-bred Thoroughbred racehorse

- Sire: Sakhee
- Grandsire: Bahri
- Dam: Palace Street
- Damsire: Secreto
- Sex: Colt
- Foaled: 2004
- Country: Great Britain
- Colour: Chestnut
- Breeder: Miss Bridget Swire
- Owner: Miss Bridget Swire
- Trainer: Hughie Morrison
- Record: 8: 5-0-1
- Earnings: £271,418

Major wins
- Cathedral Stakes (2007); July Cup (2007)

Awards
- World Champion 3-year-old sprinter on turf (2007)

Sakhee's Secret (13 March 2004 – 17 November 2021) was a Thoroughbred racehorse. He is owned and bred by octogenarian, Bridget Swire.

Sakhee's Secret defeated older horses to win the 6 furlong July Cup at Newmarket Racecourse which was a key factor in the colt being ranked the World Champion 3-year-old sprinter on turf for 2007.

Sakhee's Secret retired to Whitsbury Manor Stud in 2009.
