= Peintre Celebre =

American-bred Thoroughbred racehorse (1994–2018)

- Racing silks of Daniel Wildenstein
- Sire: Nureyev
- Grandsire: Northern Dancer
- Dam: Peinture Bleue
- Damsire: Alydar
- Sex: Stallion
- Foaled: 17 March 1994
- Country: United States
- Colour: Chestnut
- Breeder: Allez France Stables
- Owner: Daniel Wildenstein
- Trainer: André Fabre
- Record: 7: 5-1-1
- Earnings: £935,001

Major wins
- Prix Greffulhe (1997); Prix du Jockey Club (1997); Grand Prix de Paris (1997); Prix de l'Arc de Triomphe (1997)

Awards
- European Horse of the Year (1997); European Champion 3-Yr-old Colt (1997); Timeform rating: 137
- Last updated on 1 October 2024

Peintre Celebre (17 March 1994 – 19 October 2018) was an American-bred, French-trained champion thoroughbred racehorse. He won the French Derby and the Prix de l'Arc de Triomphe in 1997.

== Background ==
Peintre Celebre was bred and owned by businessman Daniel Wildenstein and trained by André Fabre. The horse was a son of Nureyev, France's champion miler in 1980, who was in turn the son of the outstanding sire Northern Dancer. He was by Alydar on his dam's side.

== Racing career ==
Peintre Celebre was lightly raced as a two-year-old. He entered only two races, winning one and finishing third in the other.

In 1997, at age three, the horse won the French Derby and the Grand Prix de Paris before facing the best horses in Europe in France's most valuable race, the Prix de l'Arc de Triomphe. Ridden by jockey Olivier Peslier, Peintre Celebre won by five lengths and broke the track record by 3.4 seconds. His victory made him only the second horse after Le Pacha in 1941 to complete that treble of Group One races.

Peintre Celebre raced five times that year, winning four starts and finishing a close second in the other. He was named European Horse of the Year and the International Classification rated him the best in the world in 1997.

== Stud career ==
Before the 1998 racing season, Peintre Celebre suffered a career-ending injury and was retired to breeding at Coolmore Stud in Fethard, County Tipperary, Ireland. Later he was sent to Australia in 1998-2003 and to Japan for one season in 2001. His offspring include Pride, Byword and Collection (Hong Kong Derby). Pensioned from stud duties in 2014, Peintre Celebre died on 19 October 2018.

== Pedigree ==
Pedigree of Peintre Celebre
Sire Nureyev	Northern Dancer	Nearctic	Nearco
Sire Nureyev	Northern Dancer	Nearctic	Lady Angela
Sire Nureyev	Northern Dancer	Natalma	Native Dancer
Sire Nureyev	Northern Dancer	Natalma	Almahmoud
Sire Nureyev	Special	Forli	Aristophanes
Sire Nureyev	Special	Forli	Trevisa
Sire Nureyev	Special	Thong	Nantallah
Sire Nureyev	Special	Thong	Rough Shod II
Dam Peinture Bleue	Alydar	Raise a Native	Native Dancer
Dam Peinture Bleue	Alydar	Raise a Native	Raise You
Dam Peinture Bleue	Alydar	Sweet Tooth	On-and-On
Dam Peinture Bleue	Alydar	Sweet Tooth	Plum Cake
Dam Peinture Bleue	Petroleuse	Habitat	Sir Gaylord
Dam Peinture Bleue	Petroleuse	Habitat	Little Hut
Dam Peinture Bleue	Petroleuse	Piencia	Le Haar
Dam Peinture Bleue	Petroleuse	Piencia	Petite Saguenay
