= Hayil =

American-bred Thoroughbred racehorse

- Sire: Dayjur
- Grandsire: Danzig
- Dam: Futuh
- Damsire: Diesis
- Sex: Stallion
- Foaled: 18 April 1995
- Country: United States
- Colour: Brown
- Breeder: Shadwell Farm
- Owner: Hamdan Al Maktoum
- Trainer: David Morley; Melanie Morley; Freddy Head
- Record: 13: 2-2-2
- Earnings: £77,683

Major wins
- Middle Park Stakes (1997)

Hayil (foaled 18 April 1995) is an American-bred Thoroughbred racehorse and sire best known for his upset win in the 1997 Middle Park Stakes. As a two-year-old in England, he showed promising form in his first five starts, winning once and placing three times. On his final race of the season he was equipped with blinkers for the first time and won the Middle Park Stakes at odds of 14/1. After the death of his trainer David Morley he was transferred to France but never recovered his juvenile form and failed to win in seven subsequent races. Hayil later stood as a breeding stallion in Australia.

== Background ==
Hayil was a "tough, nuggety looking" brown horse with a white blaze bred in Kentucky by his owner Hamdan Al Maktoum's Shadwell Farm. He was sent into training with David Morley at his High Haven stable in Newmarket, Suffolk. Morley was a National Hunt trainer who had enjoyed considerable success since deciding to concentrate on the flat, winning major races with horses such as Celeric and Fard. His heath however was poor and he had undergone three operation for heart problems.

Hayil was one of the best horses sired by the outstanding sprinter Dayjur. His dam Futuh showed some racing ability in eight starts, winning a maiden race at Redcar Racecourse and finishing second in the Listed Doncaster Stakes. She was descended from the British broodmare Moonstone (foaled 1942) who was the female-line ancestor of Moonax and Nocturnal Spree.

== Racing career ==
=== 1997: two-year-old season ===
Hayil made his racecourse debut in a six furlong maiden race on 24 May at Doncaster Racecourse and started at odds of 9/1 in a thirteen-runner field. Ridden by Richard Hills he led for most of the way but was overtaken in the final furlong and beaten half a length by Desert Prince. He was then stepped up in class for the Group Three Coventry Stakes at Royal Ascot and finished fifth of the fifteen runners behind Harbour Master after briefly taking the lead approaching the final quarter mile. He was then dropped back to maiden class for a six-furlong event at Newmarket Racecourse on 19 July and started 4/5 favourite ahead of eleven opponents. Ridden by Kieren Fallon he took the lead approaching the final furlong and held off the late challenge of the John Gosden-trained Iceband to win by a short head.

In August at Haydock Park Hayil started odds-on favourite for a minor stakes race but was beaten one and three-quarter lengths into second place by the Paul Cole-trained Jazz Club. In a minor event at Doncaster on 13 September he led for most of the way before being overtaken and finishing third behind Bintang and Sky Rocket. On 2 October the colt was stepped up to Group One class for the Middle Park Stakes over six furlongs at Newmarket in which he was partnered by Richard Hills and started a 14/1 outsider in an eight-runner field. The Mill Reef Stakes winner Arkadian Hero started 10/11 favourite ahead of Victory Note (Rose Bowl Stakes), Carrowkeel (Gimcrack Stakes) and Captain Tim. Wearing blinkers for the first time Hayil was among the leaders from the start, went to the front two furlongs out and held on in the closing stages to win by three quarters of a length and a head from Carrowkeel and Designer. Commenting on his decision to apply blinkers, Morley said of the winner "He is a tough little horse and is 100 per cent genuine, and has never run a bad race. But he just wouldn't concentrate. He was like one of those schoolboys whose report reads 'could do better if he didn't look out of the window'."

=== 1998: three-year-old season ===
David Morley died of a heart attack in January 2008 after which his widow Melanie briefly inherited the training licence. Hayil was then sent to France where he was trained by Freddy Head. On his first run for his new trainer, Hayil last of the five runners in the Prix Djebel at Maisons-Laffitte Racecourse in April. In his four remaining races he was matched against older horses and failed to win, producing probably his best effort of the year when finishing third in the Prix de la Porte Maillot over 1400 metres at Longchamp Racecourse in June. In his other three starts, he finished unplaced in the Prix Messidor, Prix Maurice de Gheest and Prix de Meautry.

=== 1999: four-year-old season ===
Hayil remained in training as a four-year-old but made no impact in two races. He finished sixth in the Listed Prix Servanne over 1100 metres at Chantilly Racecourse in April and fifth in the Prix du Chemin de Fer du Nord at the same track in June.

== Stud record ==
At the end of his racing career, Hayil was exported to become a breeding stallion in Australia. In 2004 he was based at the Lyndhurst Stud in Queensland. Hayil sired winners of many minor races but no top class performers.

== Pedigree ==
Pedigree of Hayil (USA), brown stallion, 1995
Sire Dayjur (USA) 1987	Danzig (USA); 1977	Northern Dancer	Nearctic
Sire Dayjur (USA) 1987	Danzig (USA); 1977	Northern Dancer	Natalma
Sire Dayjur (USA) 1987	Danzig (USA); 1977	Pas de Nom	Admiral's Voyage
Sire Dayjur (USA) 1987	Danzig (USA); 1977	Pas de Nom	Petitioner
Sire Dayjur (USA) 1987	Gold Beauty (USA); 1979	Mr. Prospector	Raise a Native
Sire Dayjur (USA) 1987	Gold Beauty (USA); 1979	Mr. Prospector	Gold Digger
Sire Dayjur (USA) 1987	Gold Beauty (USA); 1979	Stick To Beauty	Illustrious
Sire Dayjur (USA) 1987	Gold Beauty (USA); 1979	Stick To Beauty	Hail to Beauty
Dam Futuh (USA) 1988	Diesis (GB); 1980	Sharpen Up	Atan
Dam Futuh (USA) 1988	Diesis (GB); 1980	Sharpen Up	Rocchetta
Dam Futuh (USA) 1988	Diesis (GB); 1980	Doubly Sure	Reliance
Dam Futuh (USA) 1988	Diesis (GB); 1980	Doubly Sure	Soft Angels
Dam Futuh (USA) 1988	Hardship (USA); 1977	Drone	Sir Gaylord
Dam Futuh (USA) 1988	Hardship (USA); 1977	Drone	Cap and Bells
Dam Futuh (USA) 1988	Hardship (USA); 1977	Hard And Fast	Etonian
Dam Futuh (USA) 1988	Hardship (USA); 1977	Hard And Fast	We Try Harder (Family: 1-w)
