= Byword (horse) =

British-bred Thoroughbred racehorse

- Sire: Peintre Celebre
- Grandsire: Nureyev
- Dam: Binche
- Damsire: Woodman
- Sex: Stallion
- Foaled: 13 February 2006
- Country: United Kingdom
- Colour: Bay
- Breeder: Juddmonte Farms
- Owner: Khalid Abdullah
- Trainer: André Fabre
- Record: 16: 7-2-1
- Earnings: £699,385

Major wins
- Prix Pelleas (2009); Prix Jacques Laffitte (2010); Prix du Muguet (2010); Prince of Wales's Stakes (2010); Prix du Chemin de Fer du Nord (2011); Prix Dollar (2011)

Awards
- Top-rated older male horse in France (2010)

Byword (foaled 13 February 2006) is a British-bred, French-trained Thoroughbred racehorse and sire. Unraced as a two-year-old, he showed promising form, winning two of his four races including the listed Prix Pelleas. In the following year he emerged as a world-class performer, winning the listed Prix Jacques Laffitte before defeating strong fields in both the Prix du Muguet and the Prince of Wales's Stakes. In the same year he also finished second in the Prix d'Ispahan and third in the International Stakes and was rated one of the twenty best racehorses in the world. As a five-year-old he added wins in the Prix du Chemin de Fer du Nord and the Prix Dollar before being retired to stud. He is currently (2015) standing a breeding stallion in South Africa.

== Background ==
Byword is a chestnut horse with a broad white blaze and a long white sock on his left hind leg, bred in the United Kingdom by his owner, Khalid Abdullah's, Juddmonte Farms. He was sired by the American-bred Peintre Celebre who won the Prix du Jockey Club, Grand Prix de Paris and Prix de l'Arc de Triomphe in 1997. Peintre Celebre's other progeny included Pride and the Hong Kong Derby winner Collection. Byword'd dam Binche made no impact as a racecourse, but has been a very successful broodmare, also producing the multiple Grade I winner Proviso. During his racing career he was trained in France by André Fabre.

== Racing career ==
=== 2009: three-year-old season ===
Byword began his racing career in the Prix Bend Or over 1600 metres at Maisons-Laffitte Racecourse on 4 June. Ridden by Stéphane Pasquier he won by three-quarters of a length from Skins Game and seven others. A month later he was stepped up in class and won the Listed Prix Pelleas over 2000 metres at Compiègne, with Cirrus des Aigles finishing third. The colt was stepped up again for the Group Two Prix Guillaume d'Ornano at Deauville Racecourse in August. He started the 6/4 favourite but finished fourth behind the British-trained Sri Putra. Maxime Guyon then took over from Pasguier and rode the horse in all his subsequent races. In September he started odds-on favourite (coupled with his owner's other runner World Heritage) for the Prix du Prince d'Orange at Longchamp Racecourse and finished fourth to Cirrus des Aigles.

=== 2010: four-year-old season ===
On his first appearance as a four-year-old, Byword won the listed Prix Jacques Laffitte on very soft ground at Maisons-Laffitte in April, beating Unnefer "impressively" by two and a half lengths with the odds-on favourite Fuisse in third. On 1 May, started the 3.1/1 second favourite in a strongly-contested renewal of the Group Two Prix du Muguet at Saint-Cloud Racecourse. The other runners included the 2009 winner of the race Gris de Gris, the Poule d'Essai des Pouliches winner Elusive Wave and the Poule d'Essai des Poulains winner Silver Frost. After tracking the leaders in the early stages, Byword accelerated in the straight and caught Gris de Gris in the final stride to win by a short head. Guyon commented "I tried to cover him up early on but couldn't. He was very courageous and has certainly made a lot of progress". Three weeks later, the colt was moved up to the highest class to contest the Prix d'Ispahan over 1950 metres at Longchamp and finished second by half a length to Goldikova, with the first two finishing ten lengths clear of the other six runners.

On 16 June, Byword was sent to Britain and started 5/2 favourite for the Group One Prince of Wales's Stakes over ten furlongs at Royal Ascot. His opponents included Twice Over, Presvis, Debussy, Shalanaya (Prix de l'Opéra), Cavalryman (Grand Prix de Paris), Glass Harmonium (Gordon Richards Stakes) and Mawatheeq (Cumberland Lodge Stakes). Guyon positioned the colt just behind the leaders before moving up on the outside in the straight to overtake the outsider Tazeez a furlong from the finish. He held off a late challenge from Twice Over to win by half a length with Tazeez three quarters of a length away in third. Fabre commented "I knew the horse had the ability. He's a very good horse. He matured from three to four and last year he got a virus and he's just coming to himself". Fabre also praised the 21-year-old Guyon, who was winning his first race in Britain, saying "I am very pleased for him. Not only is he a good jockey, he is a nice chap. There are always worries before a race and his inexperience was one, but he is very laid back".

Byword returned to England in August and started 11/4 second favourite for the International Stakes over ten and a half furlongs at York Racecourse. After taking the lead in the straight he was overtaken in the final furlong and finished third, beaten half a length and three quarters of a length by Rip Van Winkle and Twice Over. On his final appearance of the season, Byword started favourite for the Prix Foy at Longchamp in September, but finished fourth behind Duncan, Nakayama Festa and Timos.

=== 2011: five-year-old season ===
Byword remained in training as a five-year-old and began his third campaign by finishing second to Rajsaman in the Prix du Muguet on 1 May. Three weeks later he finished fifth to Goldikova in the Prix d'Ispahan. On 12 June, Byword was dropped in class to contest the Prix du Chemin de Fer du Nord over 1600 metres at Chantilly Racecourse. After racing just behind the leaders he accelerated into the lead in the last 200 metres and won, easing down, by three-quarters of a length from Vagabond Shoes.

After a break of over three months, Byword returned to contest the Prix Dollar at Longchamp on 1 October. He started the 9/2 second favourite behind Cirrus des Aigles in a field which also included the Select Stakes winner French Navy, and the Dermot Weld-trained Famous Name, winner of eight Group races in Ireland. After racing in fifth place, Byword briefly struggled to obtain a clear run in the straight before accelerating in the last 200 metres, catching Cirrus des Aigles in the final strides, and winning by a short neck. Byword embarked on an international campaign in the late autumn of 2011 but had no success. On 5 November he finished eighth behind the 50/1 outsider Court Vision in the Breeders' Cup Mile at Churchill Downs. For his final race he sent to Hong Kong and finished sixth to California Memory in the Hong Kong Cup on 11 December.

== Assessment ==
In the 2010 World Thoroughbred Rankings, Byword was given a rating of 124, making him the fourteenth best racehorse in the world and the best French-trained older male. In the following year he was rated 121, making him the 38th best horse in the world.

== Stud record ==
Byword was retired from racing at the end of 2011 and exported to stand as a breeding stallion in South Africa. As of 2015, he is based at the Mauritzfontein Stud.

== Pedigree ==
Pedigree of Byword (GB), chestnut stallion, 2006
Sire Peintre Celebre (USA) 1994	Nureyev (USA); 1977	Northern Dancer	Nearctic
Sire Peintre Celebre (USA) 1994	Nureyev (USA); 1977	Northern Dancer	Natalma
Sire Peintre Celebre (USA) 1994	Nureyev (USA); 1977	Special	Forli
Sire Peintre Celebre (USA) 1994	Nureyev (USA); 1977	Special	Thong
Sire Peintre Celebre (USA) 1994	Peinture Bleue (USA); 1987	Alydar	Raise a Native
Sire Peintre Celebre (USA) 1994	Peinture Bleue (USA); 1987	Alydar	Sweet Tooth
Sire Peintre Celebre (USA) 1994	Peinture Bleue (USA); 1987	Petroleuse	Habitat
Sire Peintre Celebre (USA) 1994	Peinture Bleue (USA); 1987	Petroleuse	Plencia
Dam Binche (USA) 1999	Woodman (USA); 1983	Mr. Prospector	Raise a Native
Dam Binche (USA) 1999	Woodman (USA); 1983	Mr. Prospector	Gold Digger
Dam Binche (USA) 1999	Woodman (USA); 1983	Playmate	Buckpasser
Dam Binche (USA) 1999	Woodman (USA); 1983	Playmate	Intriguing
Dam Binche (USA) 1999	Binary (GB); 1993	Rainbow Quest	Blushing Groom
Dam Binche (USA) 1999	Binary (GB); 1993	Rainbow Quest	I Will Follow
Dam Binche (USA) 1999	Binary (GB); 1993	Balabina	Nijinsky
Dam Binche (USA) 1999	Binary (GB); 1993	Balabina	Peace (Family: 1-p)

- Byword is inbred 4 × 4 to Raise a Native, meaning that this stallion appears twice in the fourth generation of his pedigree.
