= 2013 Prix de l'Arc de Triomphe =

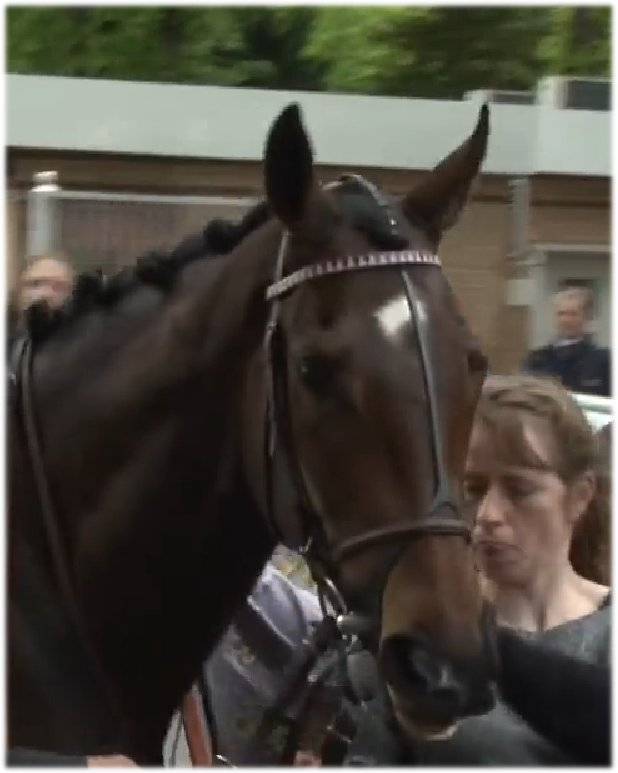
- Location: Longchamp Racecourse
- Date: October 6, 2013
- Winning horse: Treve

The 2013 Prix de l'Arc de Triomphe was a horse race held at Longchamp on Sunday 6 October 2013. It was the 92nd running of the Prix de l'Arc de Triomphe.

The winner was Treve, a three-year-old filly trained in France by Criquette Head-Maarek and ridden by Thierry Jarnet.

Treve started second favourite in the race. The field was a strong one, including Orfevre, Ruler of the World, Kizuna, Intello, Al Kazeem and Leading Light. Treve was ridden by Thierry Jarnet as Frankie Dettori had broken his ankle in a fall at Nottingham Racecourse. Treve sweated up badly before the race and started poorly. Treve made ground rapidly on the outside and took the lead in the straight before accelerating clear of the field to win easily by five lengths from Orfevre and Intello.

== Race Details ==
- Sponsor: Qatar Racing and Equestrian Club
- Purse: €4,800,000
- Going: Soft
- Distance: 2,400 metres
- Number of runners: 17
- Winner's time: 2:32.04

== Full Result ==
| Pos. | Marg. | Horse | Age | Jockey | Trainer (Country) |
|---|---|---|---|---|---|
| 1 | | Treve | 3 | Thierry Jarnet | Criquette Head-Maarek (FR) |
| 2 | 5 | Orfevre | 5 | Christophe Soumillon | Yasutoshi Ikee (JP) |
| 3 | nk | Intello | 3 | Olivier Peslier | André Fabre (FR) |
| 4 | 2 | Kizuna | 3 | Yutaka Take | Shozo Sasaki (JP) |
| 5 | 2 | Penglai Pavilion | 3 | Mickael Barzalona | André Fabre (FR) |
| 6 | 2 | Al Kazeem | 5 | James Doyle | Roger Charlton (GB) |
| 7 | shd | Ruler Of The World | 3 | Ryan Moore | Aiden O'Brien (IRE) |
| 8 | 3/4 | Flintshire | 3 | Maxime Guyon | André Fabre (FR) |
| 9 | nse | Going Somewhere | 4 | Gregory Benoist | David Smaga (FR) |
| 10 | snk | Meandre | 5 | Umberto Rispoli | Arslangirej Savujev (CZE) |
| 11 | nk | Sahawar | 3 | Thierry Thulliez | Christophe Ferland (FR) |
| 12 | nse | Leading Light | 3 | Gerald Mosse | Aiden O'Brien (IRE) |
| 13 | 2 | Joshua Tree | 6 | Richard Hughes | Ed Dunlop (GB) |
| 14 | 3/4 | Ocovango | 3 | Stephane Pasquier | André Fabre (FR) |
| 15 | snk | Pirika | 5 | Pierre-Charles Boudot | André Fabre (FR) |
| 16 | 2 | Very Nice Name | 4 | Pierantonio Convertino | Alban De Mieulle (FR) |
| 17 | 3 | Haya Landa | 5 | Franck Blondel | L Audon (FR) |

• Abbreviations: nse = nose; nk = neck; snk = short neck; hd = head; shd = short head; dist = distance

== Subsequent breeding careers ==
Leading progeny of participants in the 2013 Prix de l'Arc de Triomphe.

=== Sires of Classic winners ===
Orfevre (2nd)

- Epoca d'Oro – 1st Satsuki Shō (2018)
- Lucky Lilac – 1st Queen Elizabeth II Cup (2019)
- Authority – 1st Aoba Sho (2020)
- Gilded Mirror – 3rd NHK Mile Cup (2020)
- Juryoku Pierrot - 1st Yushun Himba (2026)

Kizuna (4th)

- Akai Ito – 1st Queen Elizabeth II Cup (2021)
- Justin Milano – 1st Satsuki Shō (2024)

=== Sires of Group/Grade One winners ===
Orfevre (2nd)

- Marche Lorraine - (1st BC Distaff 2021)
- Ushba Tesoro - (1st Dubai World Cup 2023)

Intello (3rd)

- Intellogent – 1st Prix Jean Prat (2018)
- Louis d'Or – 3rd Prix du Jockey Club (2018)
- Slalom – 2nd Grand Prix de Paris (2019)
- Regal Reality – 3rd Eclipse Stakes (2019)

Kizuna (4th)

- Songline (1st Yasuda Kinen (2022, 2023), Victoria Mile 2023)
- W Heart Bond (1st Champions Cup 2025)
- Sixpence (1st Yasuda Kinen 2026)

Ruler of the World (7th)

- Iridessa – 1st Fillies' Mile (2018), 1st Matron Stakes, 1st Pretty Polly Stakes (Ireland), 1st Breeders' Cup Filly & Mare Turf (2019)

Al Kazeem (6th)

- Aspetar – 1st Preis von Europa (2019)

Going Somewhere (9th)

- Quero Te Mucho – 1st Grande Prêmio São Paulo (2026)

=== Other stallions ===
Kizuna (4th) – Maltese Diosa (1st Tulip Sho 2020), Deep Bond (1st Prix Foy 2021)
Ocovango (14th) – Langer Dan – 1st Wensleydale Juvenile Hurdle (2019)
Joshua Tree (13th) – Minor flat and jumps winners
Leading Light (12th) – Minor flat and jumps runners
Very Nice Name (16th) – Minor flat runners
Flintshire (8th) – Exported to America – Offspring yet to race
Meandre (10th) – Exported to Czech Republic

=== Broodmares ===
Pirika (15th) – Minor winner in Japan
Haya Landa (17th) – Minor winner in Japan
Treve (1st) – Offspring yet to race
