= Arcaño =

Arcaño is a Spanish surname. Notable people with the surname include:

- Antonio Arcaño (1911–1994), Cuban flautist and bandleader
- Alfredo Arcaño (1868–?), Cuban baseball player

== See also ==
- Archangelo Arcano, Italian military engineer in the service of Henry VIII
