= Dayjur =

American-bred Thoroughbred racehorse and sire (1987–2013)

- Sire: Danzig
- Grandsire: Northern Dancer
- Dam: Gold Beauty
- Damsire: Mr. Prospector
- Sex: Stallion
- Foaled: 1987
- Country: United States
- Colour: Brown
- Breeder: Georgia E. Hofmann
- Owner: Sheikh Hamdam Al-Maktoum
- Trainer: Dick Hern
- Record: 11:7-3-0
- Earnings: £327,280

Major wins
- Temple Stakes (1990); King's Stand Stakes (1990); Nunthorpe Stakes (1990); Ladbroke Sprint Cup (1990); Prix de l'Abbaye de Longchamp (1990)

Awards
- British Horse of the Year (1990); European Champion Sprinter (1990)

Honours
- Timeform rating: 137; British Champions Series Hall of Fame (2021)
- Last updated on 16 June 2022

Dayjur (6 February 1987 – 25 September 2013) was an American-bred, British-trained Thoroughbred racehorse. A specialist sprinter, he ran eleven times between June 1989 and October 1990 and won seven races. In 1990 he dominated European sprinting, winning the King's Stand Stakes, the Nunthorpe Stakes, the Ladbroke Sprint Cup and the Prix de l'Abbaye. On his final racecourse appearance he finished second to Safely Kept in the Breeders' Cup Sprint. The Racing Post and the Sporting Life called him the world's fastest horse. Dayjur was one of the highest-rated European sprinters since World War Two.

== Background ==
Dayjur was a dark-brown horse standing 15.3 hands bred in Kentucky by Georgia E. Hofmann. He was sired by Danzig out of the American Champion Sprinter Gold Beauty. As a yearling he was bought for $1.65m by Hamdan Al-Maktoum and sent to be trained in England. Dayjur was trained by Dick Hern at West Ilsley in Berkshire. He was ridden in all his races by Scottish jockey Willie Carson.

== Racing career ==
=== 1989: two-year-old season ===
Dayjur made his first racecourse appearance in the six furlong Kennett Maiden Stakes at Newbury on 15 June. He started the 8/15 favourite against thirteen opponents and won "easily" by a length. A month later he was moved up in class for the Listed Manton Rose Bowl Stakes over the same course and distance. He started 8/13 favourite but was beaten half a length by the Clive Brittain-trained Rushmore. At the end of the year he was given a "Hobday" operation to improve his breathing.

=== 1990: three-year-old season ===
==== Spring ====
In the spring of 1990, Dayjur was aimed at the 2000 Guineas, but ran disappointing in his trial race, finishing seventh of the ten runners in the European Free Handicap over seven furlongs at Newmarket. He was moved back down to six furlongs and won a minor race at Nottingham before being beaten a head by Tod in a similar event at Newbury. Ten days after his disappointing run at Newbury, Dayjur contested his first Group Race when he was pitted against more experienced sprinters in the five furlong Temple Stakes at Sandown Park Racecourse. On this occasion, Carson allowed the colt to lead from the start and he won by two lengths without being seriously challenged.

==== Summer ====
In June, Dayjur was sent to Royal Ascot for the five-furlong King's Stand Stakes, which was then a Group Two race. Hern was concerned about the soft ground, but Hamdan Al Maktoum insisted on running him. Dayjur led almost from the start and drew clear in the final two furlongs to beat the French colt Ron's Victory by two and a half lengths, with a gap of six lengths to the rest of the field. In September, Ron's Victory won the Diadem Stakes by ten lengths to frank the form. In August, Dayjur was made 8/11 favourite for the Group One Nunthorpe Stakes at York, with the King George Stakes winner Argentum the only horse seriously supported against him. Once again, Carson allowed him to lead from the start and Dayjur pulled away in the closing stages to win by four lengths in a course record time of 56.16. The Racing Post described the performance as "very impressive".

==== Autumn ====
In September, Dayjur was moved back up to six furlongs for the Ladbroke Sprint Cup at Haydock Park. He started the 1/2 favourite against a field which included the July Cup winner Royal Academy and the Prix Maurice de Gheest winner Dead Certain. Dayjur led from the start, went clear inside the final quarter mile and held off Royal Academy to win by one and a half lengths. In October, Royal Academy won the Breeders' Cup Mile. On his final European start, Dayjur contested the Prix de l'Abbaye at Longchamp Racecourse in Paris. Only five horses appeared to oppose him and he led from the start before winning by two lengths and being eased down in the closing stages and lost some ground when appearing to jump a shadow cast across the course.

During his final race, the 1990 Breeders' Cup Sprint at Belmont Park, Dayjur overcame a difficult wide draw to contest the lead with Safely Kept. He looked set for victory, but in the closing seconds of the race the colt jumped a dark shadow cast over the track and another at the line, which allowed the mare to claim victory by a neck.

== Assessment ==
In their book A Century of Champions, John Randall and Tony Morris rated Dayjur the best racehorse foaled in 1987 and the fifth best British sprinter of the twentieth century behind Abernant, Irish Elegance, Pappa Fourway and Tetratema.

Carson considered Dayjur the "fastest horse I ever rode and I believe he was the fastest horse anybody ever rode" and rated him in the top two he had ever ridden.

== Stud career ==
He retired to the Shadwell Racing farm in Kentucky of his owner Sheikh Hamdan Al-Maktoum, from where he sired several good winners like Tipsy Creek (Temple Stakes), Hayil and Millstream (Cornwallis Stakes). On 18 January 2010 it was announced that Dayjur had been retired from stud duty. On 25 September 2013 Dayjur was euthanised at Shadwell "due to the infirmities of old age".

== Pedigree ==
Pedigree of Dayjur (USA), brown stallion, 1987
Sire Danzig (USA) 1977	Northern Dancer (CAN); 1961	Nearctic	Nearco
Sire Danzig (USA) 1977	Northern Dancer (CAN); 1961	Nearctic	Lady Angela
Sire Danzig (USA) 1977	Northern Dancer (CAN); 1961	Natalma (USA)	Native Dancer
Sire Danzig (USA) 1977	Northern Dancer (CAN); 1961	Natalma (USA)	Almahmoud
Sire Danzig (USA) 1977	Pas de Nom (USA); 1968	Admiral's Voyage	Crafty Admiral
Sire Danzig (USA) 1977	Pas de Nom (USA); 1968	Admiral's Voyage	Olympia Lou
Sire Danzig (USA) 1977	Pas de Nom (USA); 1968	Petitioner (GB)	Petition
Sire Danzig (USA) 1977	Pas de Nom (USA); 1968	Petitioner (GB)	Steady Aim
Dam Gold Beauty (USA) 1979	Mr. Prospector (USA); 1970	Raise a Native	Native Dancer
Dam Gold Beauty (USA) 1979	Mr. Prospector (USA); 1970	Raise a Native	Raise You
Dam Gold Beauty (USA) 1979	Mr. Prospector (USA); 1970	Gold Digger	Nashua
Dam Gold Beauty (USA) 1979	Mr. Prospector (USA); 1970	Gold Digger	Sequence
Dam Gold Beauty (USA) 1979	Stick To Beauty (USA); 1973	Illustrious	Round Table
Dam Gold Beauty (USA) 1979	Stick To Beauty (USA); 1973	Illustrious	Poster Girl
Dam Gold Beauty (USA) 1979	Stick To Beauty (USA); 1973	Hail To Beauty	Hail to Reason
Dam Gold Beauty (USA) 1979	Stick To Beauty (USA); 1973	Hail To Beauty	Lipstick (Family: 1-g)
