= Michael Bell (racehorse trainer) =

British racehorse trainer

Michael Bell (born 10 October 1960) is a British horse racing trainer based at Newmarket, Suffolk specializing in flat racing.

Bell began training in 1989 and has now trained the winners of more than 1,000 races. His most notable win came when Motivator won the 2005 Epsom Derby, and he has also trained a winner of The Oaks and Irish Oaks in Sariska as well as the winners of the Golden Jubilee Stakes and Nunthorpe Stakes. His main Jockey of Use is Jamie Spencer on the flat.
