= Sakhee =

American-bred Thoroughbred racehorse 1997–2021

- Racing silks of Godolphin
- Sire: Bahri
- Grandsire: Riverman
- Dam: Thawakib
- Damsire: Sadler's Wells
- Sex: Stallion
- Foaled: 14 February 1997
- Country: United States
- Colour: Bay
- Breeder: Sheikh Hamdan al Maktoum
- Owner: Godolphin
- Trainer: John Dunlop; Saeed bin Suroor
- Record: 14: 8-3-1
- Earnings: £2,207,096

Major wins
- Dante Stakes (2000); Sandown Classic Trial (2000); International Stakes (2001); Prix de l'Arc de Triomphe (2001)

Awards
- Timeform rating: 136
- Last updated on 14 April 2025

Sakhee (14 February 1997 – 20 August 2021) was an American-bred, British-trained Thoroughbred racehorse. He won eight of his fourteen races and was most noted for his performances as a four-year-old in 2001 when his wins included the International Stakes and the Prix de l'Arc de Triomphe.

== Background ==
Bred by the racing interests of Dubai's Sheikh Hamdan al Maktoum, his sire Bahri was almost exclusively a miler who won two Group One races at that distance. Sakhee was from the mare Thawakib, a winner of the 1993 Group II Ribblesdale Stakes whose sire was the fourteen-time Leading sire in Great Britain & Ireland, Sadler's Wells. Trained by John L. Dunlop, Sakhee raced under the Godolphin banner.

== Racing career ==
Sakhee won two of his three starts at age two. As a three-year-old in 2000, the colt won the Sandown Classic Trial and the Dante Stakes then ran second by a length to Sinndar in The Derby. In the Eclipse Stakes he suffered a muscular problem and finished fourth to winner, Giant's Causeway. At the end of the 2000 racing season he underwent surgery to remove a bone chip in a knee.

Godolphin gave Saeed bin Suroor the job of conditioning Sakhee for his four-year-old racing campaign. Being prepared for top-level races, he was entered and won the Steventon Stakes Listed race. In his next outing of 2001, he dominated the competition, winning the Group One International Stakes by seven lengths. Sent to Longchamp Racecourse in Paris, France for October's prestigious Prix de l'Arc de Triomphe, Sakhee once again dominated his opponents and won by six lengths over the previously undefeated filly, Aquarelliste. In his final start of 2001, Sakhee was sent to the United States to compete in the 2001 Breeders' Cup Classic at New York's Belmont Park. Racing on dirt for the first time in his career, he finished second by a nose to Tiznow.

Sent back to racing at age five, Sakhee won his first race, and then finished third on the dirt behind winner Street Cry in the 2002 Dubai World Cup. In the final race of his career, he ran second on turf in the G3 Prix Gontaut-Biron.

== Stud career ==
In October 2002, Sakhee was retired to breeding duty at Sheikh Hamdan's Shadwell Stud. The most successful of his offspring were Sakhee's Secret, Presvis and Tin Horse (Poule d'Essai des Poulains). Sakhee was pensioned from stud duties in 2016 and euthanized due to infirmities of old age on 20 August 2021.

== Pedigree ==
Pedigree of Sakhee (USA), brown stallion, 1997
Sire Bahri (USA) 1992	Riverman (USA); 1969	Never Bend	Nasrullah
Sire Bahri (USA) 1992	Riverman (USA); 1969	Never Bend	Lalun
Sire Bahri (USA) 1992	Riverman (USA); 1969	River Lady	Prince John
Sire Bahri (USA) 1992	Riverman (USA); 1969	River Lady	Nile Lily
Sire Bahri (USA) 1992	Wasnah (USA); 1987	Nijinsky	Northern Dancer
Sire Bahri (USA) 1992	Wasnah (USA); 1987	Nijinsky	Flaming Page
Sire Bahri (USA) 1992	Wasnah (USA); 1987	Highest Trump	Bold Bidder
Sire Bahri (USA) 1992	Wasnah (USA); 1987	Highest Trump	Dear April
Dam Thawakib (IRE) 1990	Sadler's Wells (USA); 1981	Northern Dancer	Nearctic
Dam Thawakib (IRE) 1990	Sadler's Wells (USA); 1981	Northern Dancer	Natalma
Dam Thawakib (IRE) 1990	Sadler's Wells (USA); 1981	Fairy Bridge	Bold Reason
Dam Thawakib (IRE) 1990	Sadler's Wells (USA); 1981	Fairy Bridge	Special
Dam Thawakib (IRE) 1990	Tobira Celeste (USA); 1971	Ribot	Tenerani
Dam Thawakib (IRE) 1990	Tobira Celeste (USA); 1971	Ribot	Romanella
Dam Thawakib (IRE) 1990	Tobira Celeste (USA); 1971	Heavenly Body	Dark Star
Dam Thawakib (IRE) 1990	Tobira Celeste (USA); 1971	Heavenly Body	Dangerous Dame (Family 21-a)

- Sakhee was inbred 3 × 4 to Northern Dancer meaning that the stallion appears in both the third and fourth generations of his pedigree.
