= Atraf =

Israeli LGBTQ website

- Atraf SVG
- Available in: Hebrew/English
- Website: https://www.atraf.co.il
- Launched: 2002

Atraf was a Tel Aviv-based LGBT website and app that offers a geo-located dating service and a nightlife index. The website started as an online nightlife magazine and later turned into an app. In 2014, Atraf was ranked #4 among "The 10 gayest things about Tel Aviv" by The Times of Israel. In October 2021, profiles and information of users on the website were obtained by a hacker group by the name of "Black Shadow", and were later leaked to the public.

== Atraf Dating ==
Atraf Dating was launched in 2002.

== Nightlife Index ==
Since its launch, Atraf has supplied its users with updated information on various LGBT events and parties in Tel Aviv and all over Israel. The website promotes Tel Aviv's main pride events annually. Since 2012, the website has let its users purchase tickets to some of the parties on the index and in 2016 Atraf launched a digital ticket service which lets its holder enter parties quickly.

== See also ==
- Homosocialization
