= Bahri (horse) =

American-bred Thoroughbred racehorse

- Racing colours of Hamdan Al Maktoum
- Sire: Riverman
- Dam: Wasnah
- Damsire: Nijinsky
- Sex: Stallion
- Foaled: 7 February 1992 (age 33)
- Country: United States
- Colour: Bay
- Breeder: Shadwell Farm Inc & Shadwell Estates Co Ltd
- Owner: Hamdan Al Maktoum
- Trainer: John Dunlop
- Record: 12: 3-6-2
- Earnings: £475,839

Major wins
- St James's Palace Stakes (1995); Queen Elizabeth II Stakes (1995)

Bahri (7 February 1992 – 7 September 2017) was a Thoroughbred race horse and sire, bred in the United States but trained in the United Kingdom. He is best known for the unconventional ride he was given by Willie Carson when winning the 1995 Queen Elizabeth II Stakes at Ascot Racecourse.

== Background ==
Bahri, a dark bay or brown horse, was bred at Shadwell Farm near Lexington, Kentucky. He was sired by Riverman who won three Group 1 races in France as a 3-year-old, at distances between 1,600 meters (about a mile) and 1,850 metres (about 1 mile and 1¼ furlongs). His dam, Wasnah also produced one other Group winner, namely, Bahhare, who won the Champagne Stakes at Doncaster, and was a half-sister to the dam of Ajina.

== Racing career ==
=== 1994: two-year-old season ===
Bahri raced four times as a two-year-old coming second in his first 3 maiden races. He won his last race as a two-year-old at Nottingham in a conditions race over six furlongs.

=== 1995: three-year-old season ===
==== Spring ====
His first engagement at three was in the Greenham Stakes at Newbury when he came second to Celtic Swing. His next race was the 2,000 Guineas when he lined up against Celtic Swing who was the 4/5 favourite as well as the dual Group 1 winning Pennekamp, he managed to come third in that race behind Pennekamp and Celtic Swing. His next race was the Irish 2,000 Guineas where he again came third but this time to Spectrum.

==== Summer ====
Bahri then went on to contest the St James's Palace Stakes at Royal Ascot. With some notable absences by Pennekamp and Spectrum taking The Derby route and Celtic Swing taking the Prix du Jockey Club route he came up against the Poule d'Essai des Poulains winner Vettori and the Prix Lupin winner Flemensfirth. Bahri went to the race with a pacemaker in Muhab and subsequently went on to win by four lengths and a head from Charnwood Forest and Vettori.

In July Bahri then went on to contest the Sussex Stakes at Goodwood as the evens favourite. Other than his own pacemaker, Sulb, he was the only 3 year old in the race and was only narrowly beaten by a neck by Sayyedati who had contested the race in the previous two runnings. In August he took a step up in trip for the International Stakes at York and couldn't match the subsequent winner Halling who won by three and a half lengths.

==== Autumn ====
In September he contested the Queen Elizabeth II stakes at Ascot run on the round course over a mile. According to the form and the odds Bahri (5/2) was no match for the 3 year old filly Ridgewood Pearl (8/13 favourite), again he ran with a pacemaker. Bahri was drawn widest of all the six runners. After the stalls opened Willie Carson took him to the outside rail to ride him under the trees as this is where the better ground was to be found due to the trees protecting the ground from both the watering and the rainfall. The other 5 runners, including his pacemaker, took the shorter and more conventional route against the inside rail on the ground that was described officially as Good to Soft, Soft in places. By the time they had come to the turn and Willie Carson had switched him back to the inside rail he had an advantage of 3 lengths, he then went on to win by six lengths with Ridgewood Pearl in second.

His last race was the Champion Stakes where he ended up three and a three quarter lengths 5th behind Spectrum.

== Career at Stud ==
Bahri was retired to stud at Shadwell Stud near Lexington, Kentucky, where he stood for eight years before being transferred to Derrinstown Stud in County Kildare, Ireland. In 2011 he was leased from Derrinstown Stud to stand at Girsonfield Stud in Northumberland. His fee peaked at $40,000 and is currently £2,000. During his time at Shadwell Stud he sired his only Group 1 winner, Sakhee, who won the Prix de l'Arc de Triomphe and the International Stakes at York.

== Pedigree ==
Pedigree of Bahri (USA), brown stallion, 1992
Sire Riverman (USA) 1969	Never Bend (USA); 1960	Nasrullah	Nearco
Sire Riverman (USA) 1969	Never Bend (USA); 1960	Nasrullah	Mumtaz Begum
Sire Riverman (USA) 1969	Never Bend (USA); 1960	Lalun	Djeddah
Sire Riverman (USA) 1969	Never Bend (USA); 1960	Lalun	Be Faithful
Sire Riverman (USA) 1969	River Lady (USA); 1963	Prince John	Princequillo
Sire Riverman (USA) 1969	River Lady (USA); 1963	Prince John	Not Afraid
Sire Riverman (USA) 1969	River Lady (USA); 1963	Nile Lily	Roman
Sire Riverman (USA) 1969	River Lady (USA); 1963	Nile Lily	Azalea
Dam Wasnah (USA) 1987	Nijinsky (CAN); 1967	Northern Dancer	Nearctic
Dam Wasnah (USA) 1987	Nijinsky (CAN); 1967	Northern Dancer	Natalma
Dam Wasnah (USA) 1987	Nijinsky (CAN); 1967	Flaming Page	Bull Page
Dam Wasnah (USA) 1987	Nijinsky (CAN); 1967	Flaming Page	Flaring Top
Dam Wasnah (USA) 1987	Highest Trump (USA); 1972	Bold Bidder	Bold Ruler
Dam Wasnah (USA) 1987	Highest Trump (USA); 1972	Bold Bidder	High Bid
Dam Wasnah (USA) 1987	Highest Trump (USA); 1972	Dear April	My Babu
Dam Wasnah (USA) 1987	Highest Trump (USA); 1972	Dear April	Querida (Family 13-c)
