= Aquarelliste =

French-bred Thoroughbred racehorse

- Sire: Danehill
- Grandsire: Danzig
- Dam: Agathe
- Damsire: Manila
- Sex: Filly
- Foaled: 1998
- Country: France
- Colour: Bay
- Breeder: Allez France Stables
- Owner: Daniel Wildenstein; Ecurie Wildenstein (2002)
- Trainer: André Fabre; Élie Lellouche
- Record: 13: 7-2-1
- Earnings: €1,495,708

Major wins
- Prix de Diane (2001); Prix Vermeille (2001); Prix Ganay (2002); Prix Foy (2002); Prix Exbury (2003)
- Last updated on September 7, 2007

Aquarelliste (foaled January 23, 1998) is a French Thoroughbred racehorse. Owned and bred by Daniel Wildenstein, she was sired by Danehill, a Leading sire in Australia as well as in France and Great Britain & Ireland. She was out of the mare Agathe, a daughter of Manila, the 1986 Breeders' Cup Turf winner voted 1986 U.S. Champion Male Turf Horse.

Trained by Élie Lellouche, Aquarelliste went into the 2001 Prix de l'Arc de Triomphe undefeated having won two Listed races, the Classic Prix de Diane and the Prix Vermeille. However, Godolphin Racing's colt Sakhee won the Arc with Aquarelliste finishing second, six lengths back.

Racing in 2002 at age four, Aquarelliste won that year's Prix Foy and the Group I Prix Ganay. She ran third to Ange Gabriel in the Grand Prix de Saint-Cloud at Saint-Cloud Racecourse and was third to the same horse when sent overseas to race at Sha Tin Racecourse in the Hong Kong Vase. Sent to compete in England's important King George VI and Queen Elizabeth Stakes, Aquarelliste finished fourth to winner Golan. She wound up her 2002 season with a sixth-place finish in the Prix de l'Arc de Triomphe. As a five-year-old, Aquarelliste's best result was a win in March 2003 in the Group III Prix Exbury.

Retired to broodmare duty, in 2004 Aquarelliste was bred to Sadler's Wells and produced a filly, Aquarelle Bleu.
