= Haras du Quesnay =

Haras du Quesnay, known as "Le Quesnay", was a thoroughbred horse breeding farm in France about four miles (6 km) outside the city of Deauville on 3 km^{2} (740 acres).

== Early years ==
The stud was established in 1907 by wealthy American sportsman William Kissam Vanderbilt. He sold the property to another American horseman, A. Kingsley Macomber, whose colt War Cloud won the 1918 Preakness Stakes. Macomber had other wins, including the 1923 Prix de l'Arc de Triomphe.

Prior to and during the German occupation of France in World War II the property was left abandoned.

== Head family ==
In 1958 the farm was acquired by prominent French horseman Alec Head, a descendant of the trainers who founded the English Racing Colony in Chantilly, Oise. Alec Head undertook a massive restoration of the facilities and in 1959 brought in the farm's first stallion. Over the years he and his wife Ghislaine developed Haras du Quesnay into one of the leading stud farms in the country with horses acquired from across Europe and the United States.

Ghislaine and Alec Head's children have been distinguished participants in the horse racing industry. Daughter Martine was involved with managing the farm until its closure in November 2022, son Freddy has been the champion jockey six times in France and a trainer most notably of Goldikova, and daughter Criquette Head is one of France's leading trainers and the most successful female Thoroughbred trainer in the world.

== Notable stallions ==
Haras du Quesnay was home to prominent sires and broodmares such as Sir Gaylord, 1968 Kentucky Derby winner Dancer's Image, the leading sire of broodmares in France in 1980 Le Fabuleux, Arctic Tern, Anabaa, six-time champion sire in France Highest Honor, and Numerous, a son of Mr. Prospector.
