= Riverman =

American-bred Thoroughbred racehorse (1969–1999)

- Sire: Never Bend
- Grandsire: Nasrullah
- Dam: River Lady
- Damsire: Prince John
- Sex: Stallion
- Foaled: 1969
- Country: USA
- Colour: Brown
- Breeder: Harry F. Guggenheim
- Owner: Germaine Revel Wertheimer
- Trainer: Alec Head
- Record: 8: 5-2-1
- Earnings: US$247,876 (equivalent)

Major wins
- Prix Yacowlef (1971); Prix Jean Prat (1972); Prix d'Ispahan (1972); Poule d'Essai des Poulains (1972)

Awards
- Leading sire in France (1980, 1981); Timeform rating: 131
- Last updated on 11 April 2025

Riverman (22 March 1969 – 31 July 1999) was a French Thoroughbred racehorse and highly successful sire.

== Background ==
Foaled in Kentucky, Riverman was bred by Harry F. Guggenheim of the prominent American Guggenheim family. He was from the mare River Lady and sired by Guggenheim's stallion Never Bend, a grandson of the extremely important sire, Nearco.

Purchased by French perfume magnate Pierre Wertheimer, head of the House of Chanel, the colt raced under the colors of his wife, Germaine.

== Racing career ==
Trained by Alec Head, Riverman was sent to the track in 1971 where he won the Prix Yacowlef and finished second in the Critérium de Maisons-Laffitte. The following year, he won two Group One races, the French 2000 Guineas and the Prix d'Ispahan, as well as the Group II Prix Jean Prat. Sent to race in England, he ran third to Brigadier Gerard in July's King George VI and Queen Elizabeth Stakes and second to him in October's Champion Stakes.

== Stud record ==
Retired to stud duty, he was a breeding stallion in 1974–79 Haras du Quesnay in Calvados when he was sent at stud in 1980–96 Gainesway Farm in Kentucky. The leading sire in France in 1980 and 1981, Riverman sired Group One winners All At Sea, Loup Sauvage, Latin American, Pilaster, River Flyer, River Special, Rousillon plus many other important Group One winners and Champions such as:

- Bahri - Queen Elizabeth II Stakes, St. James's Palace Stakes
- Detroit - filly who won the 1980 Prix de l'Arc de Triomphe, 1980 French Horse of the Year, Champion 3-year-old filly in France
- Gold River - filly who won the 1981 Prix de l'Arc de Triomphe, Champion 3-year-old filly in France
- Hailsham - won the 1991 Derby Italiano
- Irish River - French Horse Racing Hall of Fame, won ten of twelve starts, Champion 2-Year-Old in France, Champion Miler in France
- River Memories - won the Prix de Pomone, Prix Maurice de Nieuil, Canadian International Stakes, Flower Bowl Invitational Stakes
- Rami Winner of the Concorde Stks and second in the Queen Anne Royal Ascot, a leading sire in South Africa
- Rivlia - Graded stakes winner in France and multiple Grade I winner in California
- Triptych - multiple stakes winner including the Irish 2,000 Guineas and back-to-back Coronation Cups in 1987 and 1988.

Riverman was the damsire of Spinning World, the Champion Three-Year-Old in Ireland (1996) and Champion Older Horse in France (1997) and of Six Perfections, the 2002 European Champion Two-Year-Old Filly. As well, Riverman sired the mare Tugela who produced the great Australian Racing Hall of Fame superstar Makybe Diva, the only horse to ever win three consecutive Melbourne Cups and who is Australasia's all-time leading money earner.

Through his sons, Riverman is the grandsire of the filly Hatoof who was a champion in France in 1991 and 1993 and was voted the 1994 United States Eclipse Award for Outstanding Female Turf Horse. Riverman was also the grandsire of Vintage Crop, the 1993 European Top Stayer, Narita Taishin, winner of the 1993 Satsuki Shō in Japan, Paradise Creek, a multiple Grade I winner in the U.S. and winner of the 1994 Eclipse Award for Outstanding Male Turf Horse, and of Sakhee, winner of the 2001 Prix de l'Arc de Triomphe.

He was pensioned in 1996 and died at age thirty on 31 July 1999 at Gainesway Farm.

== Pedigree ==
Pedigree of Riverman, brown stallion, 1969
Sire Never Bend	Nasrullah	Nearco	Pharos
Sire Never Bend	Nasrullah	Nearco	Nogara
Sire Never Bend	Nasrullah	Mumtaz Begum	Blenheim
Sire Never Bend	Nasrullah	Mumtaz Begum	Mumtaz Mahal
Sire Never Bend	Lalun	Djeddah	Djebel
Sire Never Bend	Lalun	Djeddah	Djezima
Sire Never Bend	Lalun	Be Faithful	Bimelech
Sire Never Bend	Lalun	Be Faithful	Bloodroot
Dam River Lady	Prince John	Princequillo	Prince Rose
Dam River Lady	Prince John	Princequillo	Cosquilla
Dam River Lady	Prince John	Not Afraid	Count Fleet
Dam River Lady	Prince John	Not Afraid	Banish Fear
Dam River Lady	Nile Lily	Roman	Sir Gallahad
Dam River Lady	Nile Lily	Roman	Buckup
Dam River Lady	Nile Lily	Azalea	Sun Teddy
Dam River Lady	Nile Lily	Azalea	Coquelicot (family: 10-a)
