= Sarafina (horse) =

French-bred Thoroughbred racehorse

- Sire: Refuse To Bend
- Grandsire: Sadler's Wells
- Dam: Sanariya
- Damsire: Darshaan
- Sex: Mare
- Foaled: 19 April 2007
- Country: France
- Colour: Bay
- Breeder: Aga Khan IV
- Owner: Aga Khan IV
- Trainer: Alain de Royer-Dupré
- Record: 11: 6-1-2
- Earnings: £1,480,869

Major wins
- Prix Saint-Alary (2010); Prix de Diane (2010); Prix Corrida (2011); Grand Prix de Saint-Cloud (2011); Prix Foy (2011)

Awards
- World top-rated three-year-old filly (2010)

Sarafina (foaled 19 April 2007) is a French Thoroughbred racehorse and broodmare that was rated one of the best female racehorses in the world in 2010 and 2011. As a three-year-old she won her first three races including the Prix Saint-Alary and Prix de Diane before finishing third in both the Prix Vermeille and Prix de l'Arc de Triomphe. In the following year she took the Prix Corrida, Grand Prix de Saint-Cloud and Prix Foy but was beaten when favourite for the Prix de l'Arc de Triomphe and Breeders' Cup Turf. She was retired from racing at the end of that year and exported to become a broodmare in Japan.

== Background ==
Sarafina is a bay mare with a faint white star bred in France by her owner, Aga Khan IV. She was sent into training with Alain de Royer-Dupré in France and was ridden in all but two of her races by Christophe Lemaire.

She was probably the best horse sired by Refuse To Bend, who won the 2000 Guineas, Queen Anne Stakes and Eclipse Stakes but was not a conspicuous success as a breeding stallion. Sarafina's dam Sanariya showed no racing ability, failing to win in five starts but did better as a broodmare, producing several other winners including the Prix Saint-Alary runner-up Sanaya and the Group 3 winner Sandagiyr. Her grand-dam Santalina was a half-sister to the Grand Prix de Paris winner Sumayr.

== Racing career ==
=== 2010: three-year-old season ===
Sarafina did not race as a two-year-old and made her debut in a maiden race over 1600 metres at Chantilly Racecourse on 3 May 2010. Starting the 6/4 favourite she took the lead 200 metres from the finish and pulled clear of her seventeen opponents to win in "impressive" style by six lengths. Three weeks later the filly was stepped up sharply in class for the Group 1 Prix Saint-Alary over 2000 metres at Longchamp Racecourse in which she was partnered by Gerald Mosse. She was made the 13/8 favourite ahead of eight rivals including Deluxe (unbeaten in two starts), Dariole (Prix Penelope) and Hibaayeb. After racing in fifth place she accelerated in the straight and overcame a rough passage to take the lead in the closing stages and won "comfortably" by half a length from Deluxe. The racecourse stewards held an inquiry into possible interference caused by the winner but left the result unchanged. Alain de Royer-Dupré commented "It wasn’t a great interference and she really walked all over them. She's a very good filly, but still has a lot to learn".

On 13 June Sarafina started 5/4 favourite for the Prix de Diane over 2100 metres on soft ground at Chantilly when she was accompanied by her stablemates Rosanara (winner of the Prix Marcel Boussac) and Valasyra (acting as a pacemaker). The best fancied of the other six runners were Deluxe, Sandbar (Prix Cléopâtre) and Zagora. After racing in sixth place behind Valasyra, Sarafina moved upon the outside to make her challenge in the straight. She took the lead approaching the last 200 metres and kept on well in the closing stages to win by one and a half lengths from Rosanara. After the race Royer-Dupre said "I think we would like to keep her to the mile and a quarter and nurture her along. We still haven't seen the best of her".

After a break of three months Sarafina was matched against older fillies in the Prix Vermeille over 2400 metres at Longchamp on 12 September and finished third behind the four-year-olds Midday and Plumania. In the 2010 Prix de l'Arc de Triomphe over the same course and distance on 3 October the filly was ridden by Mosse as Lemaire was required to partner the stable's more fancied contender Behkabad. After being restrained in the early stages Sarafina was badly hampered when making progress on the final turn but produced a strong late run on the outside to come home third of the nineteen runners behind Workforce and Nakayama Festa.

In the 2010 World Thoroughbred Rankings Sarafina was assessed at 121, making her the twenty-sixth best horse in the world, and the best three-year-old filly (equal with Lily of the Valley).

=== 2011: four-year-old season ===
On 30 April 2011 Sarafina made her first appearance as a four-year-old in the Prix Ganay over 2100 metres at Longchamp. She finished strongly but was beaten a length by the favourite Planteur with Cirrus des Aigles and Cape Blanco in third and fourth. She was then dropped back to Group 2 class for the Prix Corrida at Saint-Cloud in May and won "easily" by two lengths from the Prix Allez France winner Announce with Lily of the Valley unplaced. The Aga Khan's racing manager, said "She ran well, turned left well and she beat a very nice filly (Announce), so we were very pleased. Everything was good". The Grand Prix de Saint-Cloud over 2400 metres on 26 June saw the filly start the 4/9 favourite against four opponents namely Cirrus des Aigles, Silver Pond (Prix Hocquart, Grand Prix de Chantilly), Zack Hall (Prix Turenne) and Indian Days (International Bosphorus Cup). After being restrained at the rear of the field she accelerated in the straight, caught Cirrus des Aigles in the final strides and won by a neck. Royer-Dupre commented "She was very fizzy at the start, but Christophe got her under control. He knew she was capable of that kind of finishing burst".

Sarafina returned for the Prix Foy (a major trial for the Arc de Triomphe) at Longchamp on 11 September for which her three opponents were St Nicholas Abbey, Nakayama Festa and Hiruno d'Amour (Tenno Sho). Starting the 4/6 favourite she turned into the straight last of the four runners but then began to make progress and won by a short neck from Hiruno d'Amour after squeezing through a narrow gap and taking the lead in the last 50 metres. The result remained unaltered after a lengthy stewards' inquiry. On 2 October Sarafina started the 4/1 favourite for the 2011 Prix de l'Arc de Triomphe but was never able to challenge the leaders and came home seventh of the sixteen runners behind Danedream. For her final race Sarafina was sent to the United States to contest the Breeders' Cup Turf at Churchill Downs on 5 November. She started the 2/1 favourite but despite staying on well in the straight she finished fourth behind St Nicholas Abbey, Sea Moon and Brilliant Speed.

In the 2011 World Thoroughbred Rankings Sarafina was given a rating 121, making her the thirty-eighth best horse in the world, and the second best four-year-old filly behind Snow Fairy.

== Breeding record ==
At the end of her racing career, Sarafina was bought for an undisclosed sum by Teruya Yoshida and exported to Japan to become a broodmare. Her foals have included;

- Geniale, a bay colt, foaled in 2014, sired by Deep Impact. Won three races including the Prix Messidor.
- Plus, bay filly, 2015, by Victoire Pisa. Won two races.
- Go Timing, bay colt, 2016, by Deep Impact. Won three races.
- Savarin, bay filly, 2017, by Deep Impact

== Pedigree ==
Pedigree of Sarafina (FR), bay mare, 2007
| Sire Refuse To Bend (IRE) 2000 | Sadler's Wells (USA); 1981 | Northern Dancer (CAN) | Nearctic |
| Sire Refuse To Bend (IRE) 2000 | Sadler's Wells (USA); 1981 | Northern Dancer (CAN) | Natalma (USA) |
| Sire Refuse To Bend (IRE) 2000 | Sadler's Wells (USA); 1981 | Fairy Bridge | Bold Reason |
| Sire Refuse To Bend (IRE) 2000 | Sadler's Wells (USA); 1981 | Fairy Bridge | Special |
| Sire Refuse To Bend (IRE) 2000 | Market Slide (USA); 1991 | Gulch | Mr. Prospector |
| Sire Refuse To Bend (IRE) 2000 | Market Slide (USA); 1991 | Gulch | Jameela |
| Sire Refuse To Bend (IRE) 2000 | Market Slide (USA); 1991 | Grenzen | Grenfall |
| Sire Refuse To Bend (IRE) 2000 | Market Slide (USA); 1991 | Grenzen | My Poly |
| Dam Sanariya (IRE) 1996 | Darshaan (GB); 1981 | Shirley Heights | Mill Reef (USA) |
| Dam Sanariya (IRE) 1996 | Darshaan (GB); 1981 | Shirley Heights | Hardiemma |
| Dam Sanariya (IRE) 1996 | Darshaan (GB); 1981 | Delsy (FR) | Abdos |
| Dam Sanariya (IRE) 1996 | Darshaan (GB); 1981 | Delsy (FR) | Kelty |
| Dam Sanariya (IRE) 1996 | Sanamia; 1987 | Top Ville | High Top |
| Dam Sanariya (IRE) 1996 | Sanamia; 1987 | Top Ville | Sega Ville (FR) |
| Dam Sanariya (IRE) 1996 | Sanamia; 1987 | Santalina (GB) | Relko |
| Dam Sanariya (IRE) 1996 | Sanamia; 1987 | Santalina (GB) | Sursum Corda (FR) (Family: 8-f) |
