= 2011 Prix de l'Arc de Triomphe =

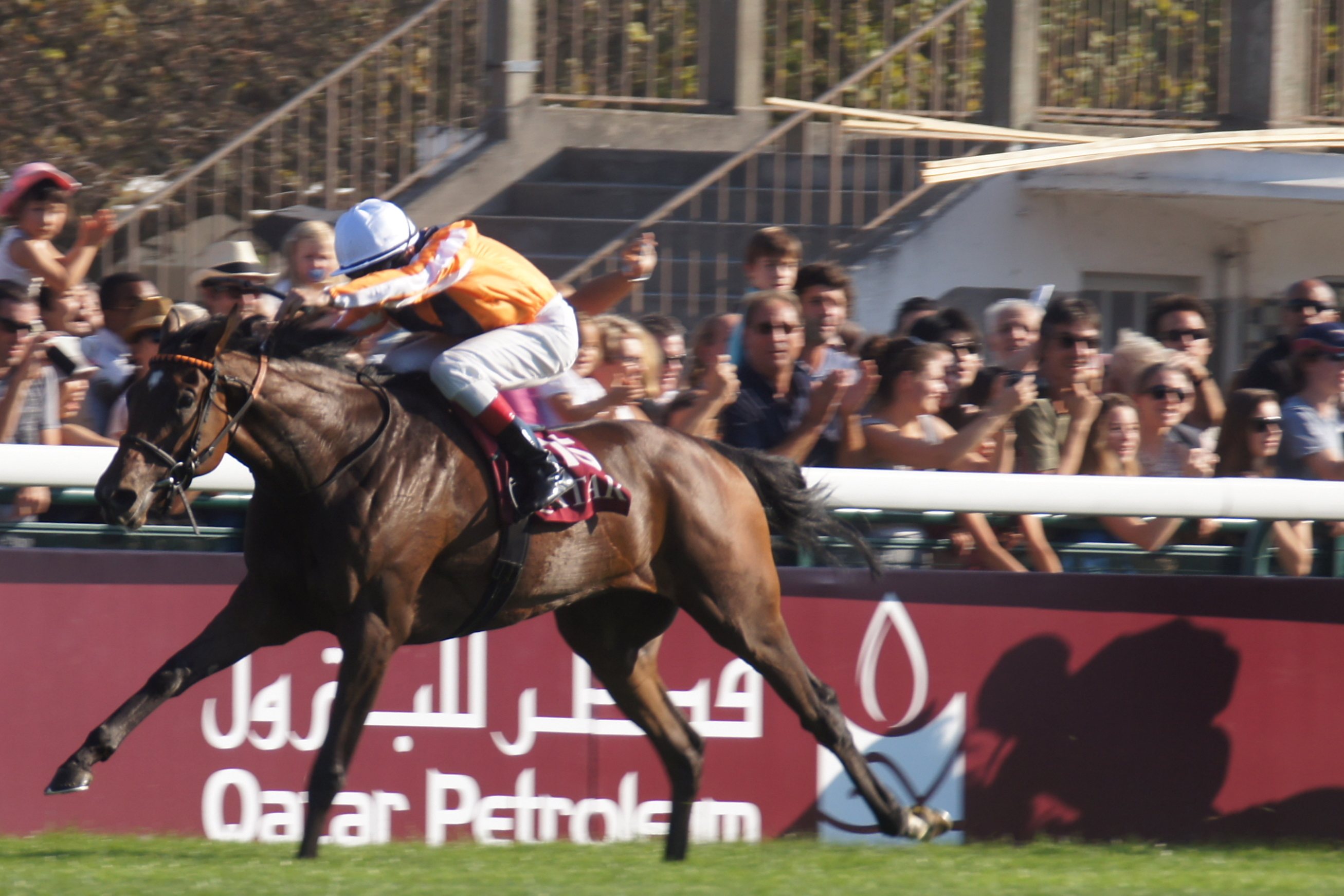
- Location: Longchamp Racecourse
- Date: October 2, 2011
- Winning horse: Danedream

The 2011 Prix de l'Arc de Triomphe was a horse race held at Longchamp on Sunday 2 October 2011. It was the 90th running of the Prix de l'Arc de Triomphe.

The winner was Danedream, a three-year-old filly trained in Germany by Peter Schiergen. The winning jockey was Andrasch Starke.

Danedream was the second German-trained horse to win the "Arc". The only prior victory was that of Star Appeal in 1975.

The winning time of 2m 24.49s set a new record for the event. The previous record of 2m 24.60s was achieved by Peintre Celebre in 1997.

Unusually for the race, the first three finishers were all fillies.

== Race details ==
- Sponsor: Qatar Racing and Equestrian Club
- Purse: €4,000,000; First prize: €2,285,600
- Going: Good
- Distance: 2,400 metres
- Number of runners: 16
- Winner's time: 2m 24.49s (new record)

== Full result ==
Pos.	Marg.	Horse	Age	Jockey	Trainer (Country)
1		Danedream	3	Andrasch Starke	Peter Schiergen (GER)
2	5	Shareta	3	Thierry Jarnet	Alain de Royer-Dupré (FR)
3	nk	Snow Fairy	4	Frankie Dettori	Ed Dunlop (GB)
4	½	So You Think	5	Seamie Heffernan	Aidan O'Brien (IRE)
5	snk	St Nicholas Abbey	4	Joseph O'Brien	Aidan O'Brien (IRE)
6	snk	Meandre	3	Maxime Guyon	André Fabre (FR)
7	snk	Sarafina	4	Christophe Lemaire	Alain de Royer-Dupré (FR)
8	¾	Silver Pond	4	Thierry Thulliez	Carlos Laffon-Parias (FR)
9	4	Galikova	3	Olivier Peslier	Freddy Head (FR)
10	¾	Hiruno d'Amour	4	Shinji Fujita	Mitsugu Kon (JPN)
11	2½	Nakayama Festa	5	Masayoshi Ebina	Yoshitaka Ninomiya (JPN)
12	nk	Workforce	4	Ryan Moore	Sir Michael Stoute (GB)
13	1	Testosterone	3	Stéphane Pasquier	Pascal Bary (FR)
14	2½	Treasure Beach	3	Colm O'Donoghue	Aidan O'Brien (IRE)
15	6	Reliable Man	3	Gérald Mossé	Alain de Royer-Dupré (FR)
16	2	Masked Marvel	3	William Buick	John Gosden (GB)

- Abbreviations: snk = short-neck; nk = neck

== Winner's details ==
Further details of the winner, Danedream.

- Sex: Filly
- Foaled: 7 May 2008
- Country: Germany
- Sire: Lomitas; Dam: Danedrop (Danehill)
- Owners: Gestüt Burg Eberstein and Teruya Yoshida
- Breeder: Gestüt Brümmerhof
