= 1985 in sports =

1985 in sports describes the year's events in world sport.

== Alpine skiing ==
- Alpine Skiing World Cup:
  - Men's overall season champion: Marc Girardelli, Luxembourg
  - Women's overall season champion: Michela Figini, Switzerland

== American football ==
- Super Bowl XIX – the San Francisco 49ers (NFC) won 38–16 over the Miami Dolphins (AFC)
  - Location: Stanford Stadium
  - Attendance: 84,059
  - MVP: Joe Montana, QB (San Francisco)
- Baltimore Stars win USFL Championship 28-24 over Oakland Invaders

== Artistic gymnastics ==
- World Artistic Gymnastics Championships –
  - Men's all-around champion: Yuri Korolev, USSR
  - Women's all-around champions: Oksana Omelianchik, USSR, Yelena Shushunova, USSR
  - Men's team competition champion: USSR
  - Women's team competition champion: USSR

== Association football ==
- NASL announces suspension of operations and hopes to return in 1986. It never did.
- England – FA Cup – Manchester United won 1-0 (aet) over Everton. Kevin Moran of MU receives first-ever red card in an FA Cup final.
- Everton are crowned English champions for the eighth time, setting a then record points total for a 42-game programme under three points for a win.

== Australian rules football ==
- Victorian Football League
  - Essendon wins the 89th VFL Premiership (Essendon 26.14 (170) d Hawthorn 14.8 (92))
  - Brownlow Medal awarded to Brad Hardie (Footscray)

== Baseball ==
- Cincinnati Reds' player/manager Pete Rose breaks Ty Cobb's All-Time Hit Record of 4,191 hits. Rose's record-breaking single was off of San Diego Padres pitcher Eric Show (September 11)
- Tom Seaver of the Chicago White Sox and Phil Niekro of the New York Yankees become the 17th and 18th pitchers to join the 300 win club on August 4 and October 6 respectively.
- Rollie Fingers breaks Sparky Lyle's American League career record of 232 saves.
- World Series – The Kansas City Royals defeat the St. Louis Cardinals 4 games to 3, becoming the first team to win the World Series after losing the first two games at home.
- Books published:
  - Bill James, The Bill James Historical Baseball Abstract: A seminal volume of baseball history by the leading sabermetrician of the day. He revised the book into a new edition in 2001.

== Basketball ==
- NCAA Men's Basketball Championship –
  - Villanova wins 66-64 over Georgetown
- NCAA Division I Women's Basketball Championship
  - Old Dominion wins 70–65 over Georgia
- National Basketball Association
  - 1985 NBA All-Star Game
  - 1985 NBA draft
  - NBA Finals
    - Los Angeles Lakers win 4 games to 2 over the Boston Celtics
  - Team moves
    - Kansas City Kings franchise moves, 1985–86 NBA season first Sacramento Kings season.
- National Basketball League (Australia) Finals:
  - Brisbane Bullets defeated the Adelaide 36ers 121-95 in the final.
- United States Basketball League ( USBL ) was founded
- Michael Jordan competes in his first dunk contest, wearing the first edition of his now famous line of "Air" Jordan basketball shoes.
- A first game of Liga Nacional de Basket, a professional basketball league of Argentina on April 26.

== Boxing ==
- April 15 – The War: Marvin Hagler knocks out Thomas Hearns in three rounds to retain the world's Middleweight title.
- August 10 – Héctor Camacho defeats José Luis Ramírez to lift the WBC's world Lightweight title.
- September 21 – Michael Spinks beats Larry Holmes by a decision in 15 rounds to become the first world Light Heavyweight champion to win a world Heavyweight title.

== Canadian football ==
- Grey Cup – B.C. Lions win 37–24 over the Hamilton Tiger-Cats
- Vanier Cup – Calgary Dinos win 25–6 over the Western Ontario Mustangs

== Cricket ==
- Kim Hughes leads a "rebel" team of players on tour of South Africa, banned from official cricket since 1970 because of apartheid

== Cycling ==
- Giro d'Italia won by Bernard Hinault of France
- Tour de France – Bernard Hinault of France
- UCI Road World Championships – Men's road race – Joop Zoetemelk of the Netherlands

== Dogsled racing ==
- Libby Riddles with her lead dogs, Axle & Dugan, becomes the first woman to ever win the Iditarod Trail Sled Dog Race

== Field hockey ==
- Men's Champions Trophy held in Perth, Western Australia, won by Australia

== Figure skating ==
- World Figure Skating Championships –
  - Men's champion: Alexander Fadeev, Soviet Union
  - Ladies' champion: Katarina Witt, East Germany
  - Pair skating champions: Elena Valova / Oleg Vasiliev, Soviet Union
  - Ice dancing champions: Natalia Bestemianova / Andrei Bukin, Soviet Union

== Gaelic Athletic Association ==
- Camogie
  - All-Ireland Camogie Champion: Kilkenny
  - National Camogie League: Kilkenny
- Gaelic football
  - All-Ireland Senior Football Championship – Kerry 2-12 died Dublin 2-8
  - National Football League – Monaghan 1-11 died Armagh 0-9
- Ladies' Gaelic football
  - All-Ireland Senior Football Champion: Kerry
  - National Football League: Kerry
- Hurling
  - All-Ireland Senior Hurling Championship – Offaly 2-11 died Galway 1-12
  - National Hurling League – Limerick 3–12 beat Clare 1–7

== Golf ==
Men's professional

- Masters Tournament – Bernhard Langer
- U.S. Open – Andy North
- British Open – Sandy Lyle
- PGA Championship – Hubert Green
- PGA Tour money leader – Curtis Strange – $542,321
- Senior PGA Tour money leader – Peter Thomson – $386,724
- Ryder Cup – Europe won 16½ to 11½ over the United States in team golf.

Men's amateur

- British Amateur – Garth McGimpsey
- U.S. Amateur – Sam Randolph

Women's professional

- Nabisco Dinah Shore – Alice Miller
- LPGA Championship – Nancy Lopez
- U.S. Women's Open – Kathy Baker
- Classique du Maurier Classic – Pat Bradley
- LPGA Tour money leader – Nancy Lopez – $416,472

== Harness racing ==
- North America Cup – Staff Director
- United States Pacing Triple Crown races –
  1. Cane Pace – Chairmanoftheboard
  2. Little Brown Jug – Nihilator
  3. Messenger Stakes – Pershing Square
- United States Trotting Triple Crown races –
  1. Hambletonian – Prakas
  2. Yonkers Trot - Master Willie
  3. Kentucky Futurity – Flak Bait
- Australian Inter Dominion Harness Racing Championship –
  - Pacers: Preux Chevalier
  - Trotters: Scotch Notch

== Horse racing ==
Steeplechases

- Cheltenham Gold Cup – Forgive 'n Forget
- Grand National – Last Suspect

Flat races

- Australia – Melbourne Cup won by What A Nuisance
- Canada – Queen's Plate won by La Lorgnette
- France – Prix de l'Arc de Triomphe won by Rainbow Quest
- Ireland – Irish Derby Stakes won by Law Society
- Japan – Japan Cup won by Symboli Rudolf
- English Triple Crown Races:
  1. 2,000 Guineas Stakes – Shadeed
  2. The Derby – Slip Anchor
  3. St. Leger Stakes – Oh So Sharp
- United States Triple Crown Races:
  1. Kentucky Derby – Spend a Buck
  2. Preakness Stakes – Tank's Prospect
  3. Belmont Stakes – Creme Fraiche
- Breeders' Cup World Thoroughbred Championships:
  1. Breeders' Cup Classic – Proud Truth
  2. Breeders' Cup Distaff – Life's Magic
  3. Breeders' Cup Juvenile – Tasso
  4. Breeders' Cup Juvenile Fillies – Twilight Ridge
  5. Breeders' Cup Mile – Cozzene
  6. Breeders' Cup Sprint – Precisionist
  7. Breeders' Cup Turf – Pebbles

== Ice hockey ==
- Art Ross Trophy as the NHL's leading scorer during the regular season: Wayne Gretzky, Edmonton Oilers
- Hart Memorial Trophy for the NHL's Most Valuable Player: Wayne Gretzky, Edmonton Oilers
- Stanley Cup – Edmonton Oilers win 4 games to 1 over the Philadelphia Flyers
- World Hockey Championship –
  - Men's champion: Czechoslovakia defeated Canada
  - Junior Men's champion: Canada defeated Czechoslovakia

== Rugby league ==
- 1985 Kangaroo tour of New Zealand
- 1985 National Panasonic Cup
- 1985 New Zealand rugby league season
- 1985 NSWRL season
- 1984–85 Rugby Football League season / 1985–86 Rugby Football League season
- 1985 State of Origin series
- 1985–1988 Rugby League World Cup

== Rugby union ==
- 91st Five Nations Championship series is won by Ireland

== Snooker ==
- World Snooker Championship – Dennis Taylor beats Steve Davis 18-17 in one of the greatest snooker matches of all time
- World rankings – Steve Davis remains world number one for 1985/86

== Swimming ==
- First Pan Pacific Championships held in Tokyo (August 15 – August 18)
- July 21 – Switzerland's Dano Halsall swims a world record in the 50m freestyle (long course) at a swimming meet in Bellinzona, shaving off 0.02 of the previous record (22.54) set by USA's Robin Leamy four years ago: 22.52.
- December 6 – USA's Tom Jager takes the world record from Dano Halsall (22.52) in the 50m freestyle (long course) at a swimming meet in Austin, Texas, clocking 22.40.

== Tennis ==
- Grand Slam in tennis men's results:
  1. Australian Open – Stefan Edberg
  2. French Open – Mats Wilander
  3. Wimbledon championships – Boris Becker
  4. US Open – Ivan Lendl
- Grand Slam in tennis women's results:
  1. Australian Open – Martina Navratilova
  2. French Open – Chris Evert
  3. Wimbledon championships – Martina Navratilova
  4. US Open – Hana Mandlíková
- Davis Cup – Sweden wins 3-2 over Germany F.R. in world team tennis.

== Volleyball ==
- Men and Women's European Volleyball Championships held in the Netherlands: both men's and women's tournaments won by USSR

== Water polo ==
- 1985 FINA Men's Water Polo World Cup held in Duisburg won by West Germany
- 1985 Men's European Water Polo Championship held in Sofia, Bulgaria won by USSR
- 1985 Women's European Water Polo Championship held in Oslo, Norway won by the Netherlands

== Multi-sport events ==
- Sixth Pan Arab Games held in Rabat, Morocco
- Second World Games held in London, United Kingdom
- Thirteenth Summer Universiade held in Kobe, Japan
- Twelfth Winter Universiade held in Belluno, Italy

== Awards ==
- Associated Press Male Athlete of the Year – Dwight Gooden, Major League Baseball
- Associated Press Female Athlete of the Year – Nancy Lopez, LPGA golf
- ABC's Wide World of Sports Athlete of the year: Pete Rose Major League Baseball
