= 2010 Prix de l'Arc de Triomphe =

French horse race

- Location: Longchamp Racecourse
- Date: October 3, 2010
- Winning horse: Workforce

The 2010 Prix de l'Arc de Triomphe was a horse race held at Longchamp on Sunday 3 October 2010. It was the 89th running of the Prix de l'Arc de Triomphe.

The winner was Workforce, a three-year-old colt trained in Great Britain by Sir Michael Stoute. The winning jockey was Ryan Moore.

Workforce had previously won the Epsom Derby, but had finished only fifth in the King George VI and Queen Elizabeth Stakes. The decision to run in the "Arc" had not been confirmed until three days before the race.

== Race details ==
- Sponsor: Qatar Racing and Equestrian Club
- Purse: €4,000,000; First prize: €2,285,600
- Going: Very Soft
- Distance: 2,400 metres
- Number of runners: 19
- Winner's time: 2m 35.3s

== Full result ==
Pos.	Marg.	Horse	Age	Jockey	Trainer (Country)
1		Workforce	3	Ryan Moore	Sir Michael Stoute (GB)
2	hd	Nakayama Festa	4	Masayoshi Ebina	Yoshitaka Ninomiya (JPN)
3	2½	Sarafina	3	Gérald Mossé	Alain de Royer-Dupré (FR)
4	1½	Behkabad	3	Christophe Lemaire	Jean-Claude Rouget (FR)
5	1	Fame and Glory	4	Johnny Murtagh	Aidan O'Brien (IRE)
6	1	Marinous	4	Davy Bonilla	Freddy Head (FR)
7	hd	Victoire Pisa	3	Yutaka Take	Katsuhiko Sumii (JPN)
8	1	Cavalryman	4	Frankie Dettori	Saeed bin Suroor (GB)
	2	Planteur (disq.)	3	Anthony Crastus	Élie Lellouche (FR)
9	4	Liang Kay	5	Stéphane Pasquier	Uwe Ostmann (GER)
10	2½	Youmzain	7	Richard Hughes	Mick Channon (GB)
11	1	Lope de Vega	3	Maxime Guyon	André Fabre (FR)
12	nse	Wiener Walzer	4	Tom Queally	Jens Hirschberger (GER)
13	5	Cape Blanco	3	Christophe Soumillon	Aidan O'Brien (IRE)
14	5	Timos	5	Kieren Fallon	Thierry Doumen (FR)
15	hd	Duncan	5	William Buick	John Gosden (GB)
16	1	Plumania	4	Olivier Peslier	André Fabre (FR)
17	8	Midas Touch	3	Seamie Heffernan	Aidan O'Brien (IRE)
18	20	Pouvoir Absolu	5	Samuel Fargeat	Élie Lellouche (FR)

- Abbreviations: nse = nose; hd = head

== Winner's details ==
Further details of the winner, Workforce.

- Sex: Colt
- Foaled: 14 March 2007
- Country: Great Britain
- Sire: King's Best; Dam: Soviet Moon (Sadler's Wells)
- Owner: Khalid Abdullah
- Breeder: Juddmonte Farms
