= 2010 Epsom Derby =

- Derby
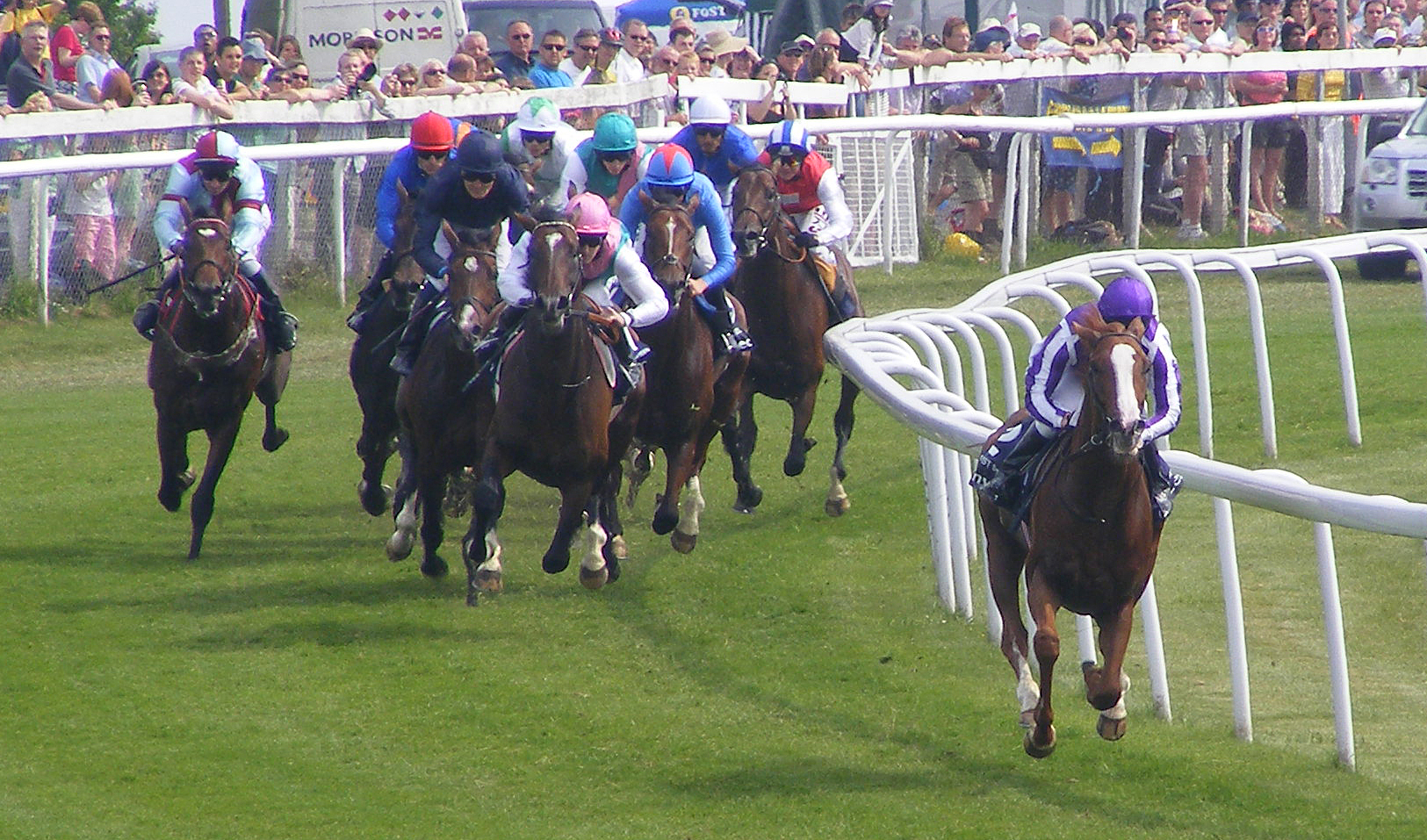
- The race is led by pacemaker At First Sight.
- Location: Epsom Downs Racecourse
- Date: 5 June 2010
- Winning horse: Workforce
- Starting price: 6/1
- Jockey: Ryan Moore
- Trainer: Michael Stoute
- Owner: Prince Khalid Abdullah

Epsom Derby 2010
1-2-3
Workforce	At First Sight	Rewilding

Also Ran
4-5-6
Jan Vermeer	Midas Touch	Al Zir
7-8-9
Coordinated Cut	Buzzword	Hot Prospect
10-11-12
Azmeel	Ted Spread	Bullet Train

The 2010 Epsom Derby was a horse race which took place at Epsom Downs on Saturday 5 June 2010. It was the 231st running of the Derby and was won by Workforce in a course record time. The winner was ridden by Ryan Moore and trained by Sir Michael Stoute. The pre-race favourite was Jan Vermeer.

== Race details ==
- Sponsor: Investec
- Winner's prize money: £771,504
- Going: Good to firm
- Number of runners: 12
- Winner's time: 2:31.33

== Full result ==
	*	Horse	Jockey	Trainer ^{†}	SP
1		Workforce	Ryan Moore	Sir Michael Stoute	6–1
2	7	At First Sight	Seamie Heffernan	Aidan O'Brien (IRE)	100–1
3	½	Rewilding	Frankie Dettori	Mahmood al Zarooni	9–2
4	4	Jan Vermeer	Johnny Murtagh	Aidan O'Brien (IRE)	9-4F
5	hd	Midas Touch	Colm O'Donoghue	Aidan O'Brien (IRE)	6–1
6	½	Al Zir	Kieren Fallon	Saeed bin Suroor	14–1
7	hd	Coordinated Cut	Jamie Spencer	Michael Bell	20–1
8	3¾	Buzzword	Ahmed Ajtebi	Mahmood al Zarooni	40–1
9	1¾	Hot Prospect	Philip Robinson	Michael Jarvis	50–1
10	16	Azmeel	William Buick	John Gosden	14–1
11	1¾	Ted Spread	Michael Hills	Mark Tompkins	28–1
12	2	Bullet Train	Tom Queally	Henry Cecil	13–2

* The distances between the horses are shown in lengths or shorter – nse = nose; shd = short-head; hd = head; nk = neck
† Trainers are based in Great Britain unless indicated

== Winner's details ==
Further details of the winner, Workforce:

- Foaled: 2007
- Sire: King's Best; Dam: Soviet Moon
- Owner: Prince Khalid Abdullah
- Breeder: Juddmonte Farms Ltd
- Rating in 2010 World Thoroughbred Rankings:

== Form analysis ==
=== Two-year-old races ===
Notable runs by the 2010 Derby participants as two-year-olds in 2009:

- Jan Vermeer - 1st Critérium International
- Midas Touch - 4th Critérium International
- Al Zir - 3rd Racing Post Trophy
- Coordinated Cut - 10th Racing Post Trophy
- Buzzword - 2nd Richmond Stakes, 2nd Solario Stakes, 1st Prix La Rochette, 3rd Prix Jean-Luc Lagardère, 5th Dewhurst Stakes, 5th Breeders' Cup Juvenile Turf
- Hot Prospect - 6th Silver Tankard Stakes
- Azmeel - 1st Washington Singer Stakes
- Ted Spread - 3rd Zetland Stakes

=== The road to Epsom ===
Early-season appearances in 2010 and trial races prior to running in the Derby:

- Workforce – 2nd Dante Stakes
- At First Sight – 2nd Ballysax Stakes, 3rd Derrinstown Stud Derby Trial
- Rewilding – 2nd Prix Noailles, 1st Cocked Hat Stakes
- Jan Vermeer - 1st Gallinule Stakes
- Midas Touch – 1st Derrinstown Stud Derby Trial
- Al Zir - 9th 2,000 Guineas
- Coordinated Cut - 3rd Dante Stakes
- Buzzword - 14th 2,000 Guineas, 4th Poule d'Essai des Poulains
- Hot Prospect - 3rd Lingfield Derby Trial
- Azmeel - 2nd Bet365 Classic Trial, 1st Dee Stakes
- Ted Spread - 1st Chester Vase
- Bullet Train - 1st Lingfield Derby Trial

=== Subsequent Group 1 wins ===
Group 1 / Grade I victories after running in the Derby.

- Buzzword – Deutsches Derby (2010)
- Rewilding - Dubai Sheema Classic (2011), Prince of Wales's Stakes (2011)
- Workforce - Prix de l'Arc de Triomphe (2010)

== Subsequent breeding careers ==
Leading progeny of participants in the 2010 Epsom Derby.

Bullet Train (12th) - Exported to America - Shuttled to Australia - Relocated to Ireland - Chapada (3rd Rosehill Guineas 2019)
Workforce (1st) - Exported to Japan
Jan Vermeer (4th) - Exported to Morocco
Midas Touch (5th) - Exported to America
Buzzword (8th) - Exported to Italy - Exported to Chile
