= Arabian World Cup =

- Class: Group 1 PA
- Location: Longchamp Racecourse; Paris, France
- Inaugurated: 2008
- Race type: Purebred Arabian
- Sponsor: QatarEnergy
- Website: france-galop.com

Race information
- Distance: 2,000 metres (1¼ miles)
- Surface: Turf
- Track: Right-handed
- Qualification: Four-years-old and up
- Weight: 57½ kg (4yo); 58 kg (5yo+); Allowances; 2 kg for fillies and mares
- Purse: €1,000,000 (2012); 1st: €500,000

The Arabian World Cup is a Group 1 horse race in France open to purebred Arabian horses aged four years or older. It is run at Longchamp over a distance of 2,000 metres (about 1¼ miles), and it is scheduled to take place each year in October.

It is the world's richest and most prestigious race reserved for purebred Arabians.

== History ==
The event was established in 2008, when it was added to Longchamp's Prix de l'Arc de Triomphe meeting on the first Sunday in October.

The prize fund for the race was initially €450,000. It was increased to €500,000 in 2011, and to €700,000 in 2012.

The Arabian World Cup is the final race of the French Arabian Breeders' Cup weekend. It is preceded by the Arabian Trophy des Poulains and the Arabian Trophy des Pouliches at Saint-Cloud, and the Arabian Trophy des Juments at Longchamp.

== Records ==
Most successful horse (2 wins):

- General – 2009, 2010
- Al Mourtajez – 2015, 2016

Leading jockey (2 wins):

- Neil Callan – Areej (2011), Mkeefa (2012)
- Maxine Guyon - Gazwan (2017), Ebraz (2019)

Leading trainer (4 wins):

- Julian Smart – Areej (2011), Mkeefa (2012), Gazwan (2017), Ebraz (2019)

Leading owner (4 wins):

- Mohammed bin Khalifa Al Thani – Areej (2011), Mkeefa (2012), Gazwan (2017), Ebraz (2019)

== Winners ==
Year	Winner	Age	Jockey	Trainer	Owner	Time
2008	Lahib	4	François-Xavier Bertras	François Rohaut	Mansoor Al Nahyan	2:16.00
2009	General	4	Arnaud Bouleau	Alban de Mieulle	Abdullah Al Thani	2:11.20
2010	General	5	Olivier Peslier	Alban de Mieulle	Abdullah Al Thani	2:19.30
2011	Areej	6	Neil Callan	Julian Smart	Mohammed Al Thani	2:12.91
2012	Mkeefa	4	Neil Callan	Julian Smart	Mohammed bin Khalifa Al Thani	2.24.03
2013	Mushrae	4	Christophe Soumillon	JP Totain	Sh Mansour bin Zayed Al Nahyan	2.17.36
2014	Djanka Des Forges	4	Christophe Lemaire	Julian Smart	Mohammed bin Khalifa Al Thani	2.11.89
2015	Al Mourtajez	3	Julien Auge	Thomas Fourcy	Al Shaqab Racing	2.10.48
2016	Al Mourtajez	4	Julien Auge	T Fourcy	Shaqab	2:24.03
2017	Gazwan	6	Maxime Guyon	Julian Smart	Mohammed bin Khalifa Al Thani	2.11.87
2018	Fazza Al Khalediah	4	Pierantonio Convertino	M. Borkowski	Polska AKF	2:13.22
2019	Ebraz	6	Maxime Guyon	Julian Smart	Mohammed bin Hamad Al Thani	2:20.88
2020	Tayf	8	Olivier Peslier	Thomas Fourcy	Cheikh Abdullah Bin Khalifa Al Thani	2.21.98
2021	Hoggar del'ardus	4	Mickael Barzalona	Thomas Fourcy	H.E. Cheikha Reem Mk Al-thani.	2.21.06
2022	Lady Princess	6	Jim Crowley	Thomas Fourcy	Khalifa Bin Sheail AlKuwari	2.17.42
2023	Al Ghadeer	4	Christophe Soumillon	Francois Rohaut	Al Shaqab Racing	2.12.17

== See also ==
- List of French flat horse races
