= 2025 Prix de l'Arc de Triomphe =

104th Prix de l'Arc de Triomphe
- Prix de l'Arc de Triomphe
- Location: Longchamp Racecourse
- Date: 5 October 2025
- Winning horse: Daryz
- Starting price: 12/1
- Jockey: Mickael Barzalona
- Trainer: Francis-Henri Graffard
- Owner: Aga Khan Studs
- Conditions: Very Soft

The 2025 Prix de l'Arc de Triomphe was a horse race held at Longchamp Racecourse on Sunday 5 October 2025. It was the 104th running of the Prix de l'Arc de Triomphe. The race was won by Aga Khan Studs' three-year-old colt Daryz, trained in France by Francis-Henri Graffard and ridden by Mickael Barzalona. It was the first win in the race for both Graffard and Barzalona. The victory gave the Aga Khan family a record eighth Prix de l'Arc de Triomphe win.

Daryz defeated Minnie Hauk by a head, with Sosie finishing third and Giavellotto fourth. Sent off at odds of 12/1, Daryz won after making his challenge in the final stages of the race.

The race was run over 2,400 metres on very soft ground and had 17 runners. Daryz recorded a winning time of 2:29.17.

== Full result ==
The below result is sourced from Racing Post, France Galop, and Sporting Life.

Pos.	Draw	Time	Marg.	Horse	Age	Jockey	Trainer (Country)
1	2	2:29.17		Daryz	3	Mickael Barzalona	Francis-Henri Graffard (FR)
2	1		head	Minnie Hauk	3	Christophe Soumillon	Aidan O'Brien (IRE)
3	3		5 1/2	Sosie	4	Stéphane Pasquier	André Fabre (FR)
4	5		head	Giavellotto	6	Andrea Atzeni	Marco Botti (GB)
5	15		neck	Byzantine Dream	4	Oisin Murphy	Tomoyasu Sakaguchi (JPN)
6	16		3/4	Arrow Eagle	4	Ioritz Mendizabal	Jean-Claude Rouget (FR)
7	10		short neck	Kalpana	4	Colin Keane	Andrew Balding (GB)
8	6		short head	Leffard	3	Cristian Demuro	Jean-Claude Rouget (FR)
9	7		2 1/2	Quisisana	5	Alexis Pouchin	Francis-Henri Graffard (FR)
10	11		head	Hotazhell	3	Shane Foley	Jessica Harrington (IRE)
11	12		1/2	Aventure	4	Maxime Guyon	Christophe Ferland (FR)
12	9		neck	White Birch	5	Dylan Browne McMonagle	John Joseph Murphy (IRE)
13	13		nose	Gezora	3	Tom Marquand	Francis-Henri Graffard (FR)
14	17		head	Croix Du Nord	3	Yuichi Kitamura	Takashi Saito (JPN)
15	8		3/4	Cualificar	3	William Buick	André Fabre (FR)
16	4		3 1/2	Alohi Alii	3	Christophe Lemaire	Hiroyasu Tanaka (JPN)
17	14		7	Los Angeles	4	Wayne Lordan	Aidan O'Brien (IRE)

== Race details ==
- Sponsor: Qatar Racing and Equestrian Club
- Purse: €5,000,000
- Going: Very Soft
- Distance: 2,400 metres
- Number of runners: 17
- Winner's time: 2:29.17
