= Jacques Doyasbère =

French jockey

Personal information
- Born: 26 December 1919 Villeneuve-Saint-Georges, France
- Died: 3 November 1969 (aged 49)
- Occupation: Jockey

Horse racing career
- Sport: Horse racing
- Career wins: Not found

Major racing wins
- Prix de l'Arc de Triomphe (4); Prix d'Ispahan (5); Grand Critérium (5); Prix Morny (5); Ascot Gold Cup (1954)

Significant horses
- Djebel, Ardan, Tantieme; Tanerko, Caracalla, Coaraze
- Updated on 25 January 2007

Jacques Doyasbère (Villeneuve-Saint-Georges, Val-de-Marne, 26 December 1919 – Paris, 3 November 1969) was a French thoroughbred racing jockey.

One of his country's top jockeys of all time, Doyasbère was closely linked to the racing teams of two of the greatest French racing stables of the 1940s and 1950s, those of Marcel Boussac and François Dupré. He won virtually every important race in France more than once, including a record four wins in the country's most prestigious event, the Prix de l'Arc de Triomphe.

== Multiple race wins in France ==
France

- Grand Critérium: - 5 - 1941, 1942, 1943, 1945, 1947
- Grand Prix de Saint-Cloud: - 2 - 1942, 1945
- La Coupe de Maisons-Laffitte: - 2 - 1945, 1952
- Poule d'Essai des Pouliches: - 3 - 1942, 1943, 1944
- Prix d'Harcourt: - 3 - 1942, 1943, 1945
- Prix de Guiche: - 3 - 1943, 1944, 1953
- Prix de l'Arc de Triomphe: - 4 - 1942, 1944, 1950, 1951
- Prix d'Hédouville: - 5 - 1942, 1943, 1945
- Prix d'Ispahan: - 5 - 1942, 1943, 1945, 1946, 1947
- Prix du Cadran: - 3 - 1944, 1945, 1946
- Prix du Gros Chêne: - 2 - 1948, 1951
- Prix du Jockey Club: - 2 - 1944, 1945
- Prix du Prince d'Orange: - 2 - 1945, 1956
- Prix Eugène Adam: - 3 - 1943, 1946, 1951
- Prix Exbury: - 3 - 1942, 1945, 1949
- Prix Ganay: - 3 - 1942, 1951, 1957
- Prix Greffulhe: - 3 - 1944, 1947, 1954
- Prix Jacques Le Marois: - 3 - 1944, 1945, 1952
- Prix Kergorlay: - 4 - 1944, 1945, 1946, 1951
- Prix Maurice de Gheest: - 2 - 1938, 1943
- Prix Morny: - 5 - 1944, 1945, 1946, 1950, 1953
- Prix Noailles: - 2 - 1941, 1953
- Prix Robert Papin: - 2 - 1945, 1953
- Prix Royal-Oak: - 2 - 1942, 1945
- Prix de Pomone: - 2 - 1941, 1953
