= 2020 Prix de l'Arc de Triomphe =

99th Prix de l'Arc de Triomphe
- Prix de l'Arc de Triomphe
- Location: Longchamp Racecourse
- Date: 4 October 2020
- Winning horse: Sottsass
- Starting price: 13/2
- Jockey: Cristian Demuro
- Trainer: Jean-Claude Rouget
- Owner: White Birch Farm
- Conditions: Heavy

The 2020 Prix de l'Arc de Triomphe was a horse race held at Longchamp Racecourse on Sunday 4 October 2020. It was the 99th running of the Prix de l'Arc de Triomphe. The race was won by White Birch Farm's four-year-old colt Sottsass, trained in France by Jean-Claude Rouget and ridden by Cristian Demuro. It was a first win in the race for Rouget and Demuro, while Sottsass improved on his third-place finish in the 2019 Arc.

Sottsass defeated In Swoop by a neck, with Persian King finishing third and Gold Trip fourth. The first five finishers were all trained in France.

The race was also notable for Enable finishing sixth as she attempted to become the first horse to win the Prix de l'Arc de Triomphe three times. She had won the race in 2017 and 2018. The four horses trained by Aidan O'Brien: Japan, Sovereign, Mogul and Serpentine, were withdrawn before the race following concerns over contaminated feed.

== Full result ==
The below result is sourced from Racing Post, JRA-VAN/netkeiba, and other contemporary race-result sources.

Pos.	Draw	Time	Marg.	Horse	Age	Jockey	Trainer (Country)
1	7	2:39.30		Sottsass	4	Cristian Demuro	Jean-Claude Rouget (FR)
2	12		neck	In Swoop	3	Ronan Thomas	Francis-Henri Graffard (FR)
3	1		1 3/4	Persian King	4	Pierre-Charles Boudot	André Fabre (FR)
4	10		head	Gold Trip	3	Christophe Soumillon	Fabrice Chappet (FR)
5	15		2	Raabihah	3	Maxime Guyon	Jean-Claude Rouget (FR)
6	8		1 1/2	Enable	6	Frankie Dettori	John Gosden (GB)
7	6		1/2	Stradivarius	6	Olivier Peslier	John Gosden (GB)
8	9		1 1/2	Deirdre	6	James Doyle	Mitsuru Hashida (JPN)
9	3		1 3/4	Way To Paris	7	Ioritz Mendizabal	Andrea Marcialis (FR)
10	2		3/4	Royal Julius	7	Shane Foley	Jerome Reynier (FR)
11	11		10	Chachnak	3	Tony Piccone	Fabrice Vermeulen (FR)

== Race details ==
- Sponsor: Qatar Racing and Equestrian Club
- Purse: €3,000,000
- Going: Heavy
- Distance: 2,400 metres
- Number of runners: 11
- Winner's time: 2:39.30
