= 2021 Prix de l'Arc de Triomphe =

100th Prix de l'Arc de Triomphe
- Prix de l'Arc de Triomphe
- Location: Longchamp Racecourse
- Date: 3 October 2021
- Winning horse: Torquator Tasso
- Starting price: 72/1
- Jockey: Rene Piechulek
- Trainer: Marcel Weiss
- Owner: Gestüt Auenquelle
- Conditions: Heavy

The 2021 Prix de l'Arc de Triomphe was a horse race held at Longchamp Racecourse on Sunday 3 October 2021. It was the 100th running of the Prix de l'Arc de Triomphe. The race was won by Gestüt Auenquelle's four-year-old colt Torquator Tasso, trained in Germany by Marcel Weiss and ridden by Rene Piechulek. It was the first Prix de l'Arc de Triomphe victory for both the trainer and jockey. Torquator Tasso became the third German-trained winner of the race after Star Appeal in 1975 and Danedream in 2011.

Torquator Tasso defeated defending champion Tarnawa by three-quarters of a length, with Hurricane Lane finishing third and Adayar fourth. The winner was sent off at odds of 72/1, making the victory one of the biggest upsets in the history of the race.

The race was run on heavy ground following substantial rainfall. Japanese-trained mare Chrono Genesis finished seventh, while Deep Bond finished fourteenth. Love was declared for the race but was a non-runner, leaving 14 actual runners.

== Full result ==
The below result is sourced from Racing Post and France Galop.

| Pos. | Draw | Time | Marg. | Horse | Age | Jockey | Trainer (Country) |
|---|---|---|---|---|---|---|---|
| 1 | 12 | 2:37.62 | | Torquator Tasso | 4 | Rene Piechulek | Marcel Weiss (GER) |
| 2 | 3 | | 3/4 | Tarnawa | 5 | Christophe Soumillon | Dermot Weld (IRE) |
| 3 | 2 | | short neck | Hurricane Lane | 3 | James Doyle | Charlie Appleby (GB) |
| 4 | 11 | | 3 | Adayar | 3 | William Buick | Charlie Appleby (GB) |
| 5 | 10 | | 3/4 | Sealiway | 3 | Franck Blondel | Cedric Rossi (FR) |
| 6 | 9 | | head | Snowfall | 3 | Ryan Moore | Aidan O'Brien (IRE) |
| 7 | 14 | | 1/2 | Chrono Genesis | 5 | Oisin Murphy | Takashi Saito (JPN) |
| 8 | 6 | | short head | Bubble Gift | 3 | Gerald Mosse | Mikel Delzangles (FR) |
| 9 | 8 | | 1 1/4 | Alenquer | 3 | Tom Marquand | William Haggas (GB) |
| 10 | 1 | | short neck | Mojo Star | 3 | Rossa Ryan | Richard Hannon (GB) |
| 11 | 7 | | 3 | Broome | 5 | Yutaka Take | Aidan O'Brien (IRE) |
| 12 | 15 | | 2 1/2 | Raabihah | 4 | Cristian Demuro | Jean-Claude Rouget (FR) |
| 13 | 13 | | 1 | Baby Rider | 3 | Ioritz Mendizabal | Pascal Bary (FR) |
| 14 | 5 | | 30 | Deep Bond | 4 | Mickael Barzalona | Ryuji Okubo (JPN) |

== Race details ==
- Sponsor: Qatar Racing and Equestrian Club
- Purse: €5,000,000
- Going: Heavy
- Distance: 2,400 metres
- Number of runners: 14
- Winner's time: 2:37.62
- Non-runner: Love
