= 1971 Prix de l'Arc de Triomphe =

- Location: Longchamp Racecourse
- Date: October 3, 1971
- Winning horse: Mill Reef

The 1971 Prix de l'Arc de Triomphe was a horse race held at Longchamp on Sunday 3 October 1971. It was the 50th running of the Prix de l'Arc de Triomphe.

The winner was Mill Reef, a three-year-old colt trained in England by Ian Balding and ridden by Geoff Lewis. Mill Reef won by three and one-and-a-half lengths from the two fillies Pistol Packer and Cambrizzia in a new race-record time of 2:28.3.

== Race details ==
- Sponsor: none
- Purse: 2,040,000 FF - First Prize: 1,200,000 FF
- Going: Firm
- Distance: 2,400 metres
- Number of runners: 18
- Winner's time: 2:28.3

== Full result ==
Pos.	Marg.	Horse	Age	Jockey	Trainer (Country)
1		Mill Reef (USA)	3	Geoff Lewis	Ian Balding (GB)
2	3	Pistol Packer (USA)	3	Freddy Head	Alec Head (FR)
3	1½	Cambrizzia (FR)	3	Sandy Barclay	D. Watson (FR)
4	nk	Caro (IRE)	4	Jimmy Lindley	Albert Klimscha (FR)
5	½	Hallez (FR)	4	Lester Piggott	William Head (FR)
6	½	Royalty (GB)	3	Joe Mercer	Dick Hern (GB)
7		Bourbon (FR)	3	Yves Saint-Martin	Alec Head (FR)
8		Arlequino (FR)	3	J. Massard	Geoffroy Watson (FR)
9		One for All (USA)	5	Willie Carson	Horatio Luro (USA)
0		Mister Sic Top (FR)	4	Jean-Claude Desaint	Gilbert Pezeril (FR)
0		Miss Dan (FR)	4	J. Taillard	Philippe Lallie (FR)
0		Armos (IRE)	4	G. Thiboeuf	Daniel Lescalle
0		Ossian (FR)	4	L. Heurteur	Dick Hern (GB)
0		Ramsin (FR)	4	Henri Samani	Geoffroy Watson (FR)
0		Ortis (ITY)	4	Duncan Keith	Peter Walwyn (GB)
0		Sharapour (FR)	3	William Williamson (AUS)	Francois Mathet (FR)
0		Irish Ball (FR)	3	William Pyers (AUS)	Philippe Lallie (FR)
0		Oarsman (GB)	3	Maurice Philipperon	John Cunnington

* Abbreviations: shd = short-head; nk = neck

== Winner's details ==
Further details of the winner, Mill Reef.

- Sex: Colt
- Foaled: 23 February 1968
- Country: USA
- Sire: Never Bend; Dam: Milan Mill (Princequillo)
- Owner: Paul Mellon (USA)
- Breeder: Paul Mellon
