= Nakayama Festa =

Japanese-bred Thoroughbred racehorse (2006–2026)

Nakayama Festa ナカヤマフェスタ
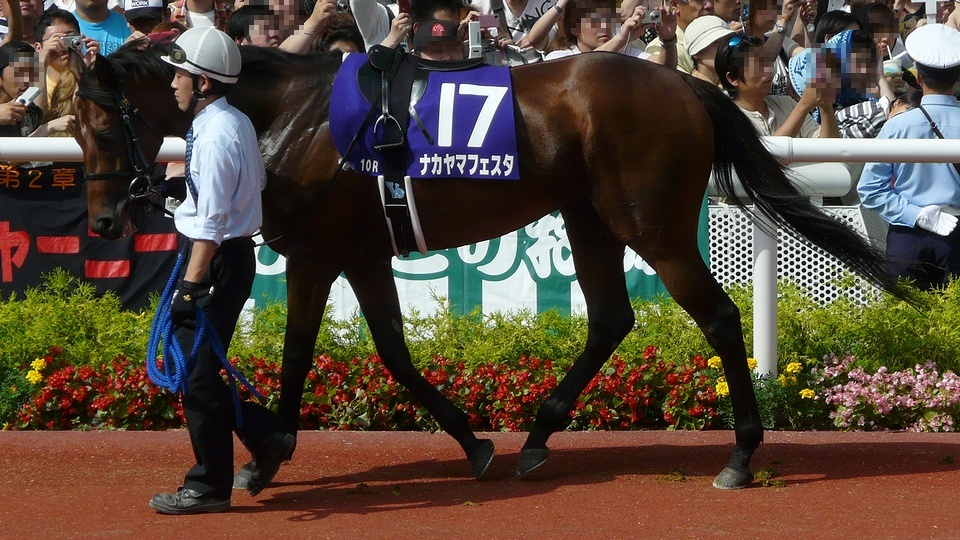
- Nakayama Festa at the 2010 Takarazuka Kinen.
- Breed: Thoroughbred
- Sire: Stay Gold (JPN)
- Grandsire: Sunday Silence (USA)
- Dam: Dear Wink (JPN)
- Damsire: Tight Spot (USA)
- Sex: Stallion
- Foaled: April 5, 2006; Arai Bokujo, Mukawa, Hokkaido, Japan
- Died: August 23, 2026 (aged 20); Urakawa Yushun Village AERU, Urakawa, Hokkaido, Japan
- Country: Japan
- Colour: Bay
- Breeder: Arai Bokujo
- Owner: Nobuko Izumi→Shinichi Izumi
- Racing colours
- Trainer: Yoshitaka Ninomiya
- Jockey: 1) Masayoshi Ebina; 2) Yoshitomi Shibata
- Record: 15: 5 - 3 - 0
- Earnings: ¥346,273,172 (£2,627,475)

Major wins
- Tokyo Sports Hai Nisai Stakes (2008); St Lite Kinen (2009); Takarazuka Kinen (2010)

Awards
- JRA Award for Best Older Male Horse (2010); Timeform rating: 132

Nakayama Festa (Japanese: ナカヤマフェスタ, Hepburn: Nakayama Fesuta; April 5, 2006 – August 23, 2026) was a champion Japanese Thoroughbred racehorse and sire, who was most notable for winning the 2010 Takarazuka Kinen and running second to Workforce in the 2010 Prix de l'Arc de Triomphe.

== Pedigree ==
Nakayama Festa was sired by the 2001 Hong Kong Vase winner Stay Gold, who was in turn sired by the influential American-bred sire Sunday Silence. Nakayama Festa's dam, Dear Wink, was sired by the American stallion Tight Spot, who was a Grade 1 stakes winner in the United States and was later exported to China for stud services.

== Racing career ==
Nakayama Festa won the Nisai Stakes as a two-year-old, which was his only placing in 2008. He only won one race (St Lite Kinen) as a 3-year-old and placed in the 2009 Keisei Hai. Nakayama Festa won the 2010 Takarazuka Kinen in Japan by beating two-time champion filly Buena Vista. He also finished second at the 2010 Prix Foy and Prix de l'Arc de Triomphe in France. Nakayama Festa ran in two races in 2011. He finished in last place out of a field of four horses at the Prix Foy run at Longchamp Racecourse in France, the race ultimately being won by the French horse Sarafina. In the final start of his career on October 2, 2011, at the same course, Nakayama Festa finished in 11th place out of a field of 16 horses in the Prix de l'Arc de Triomphe, which was won by Danedream.

== Stud career ==
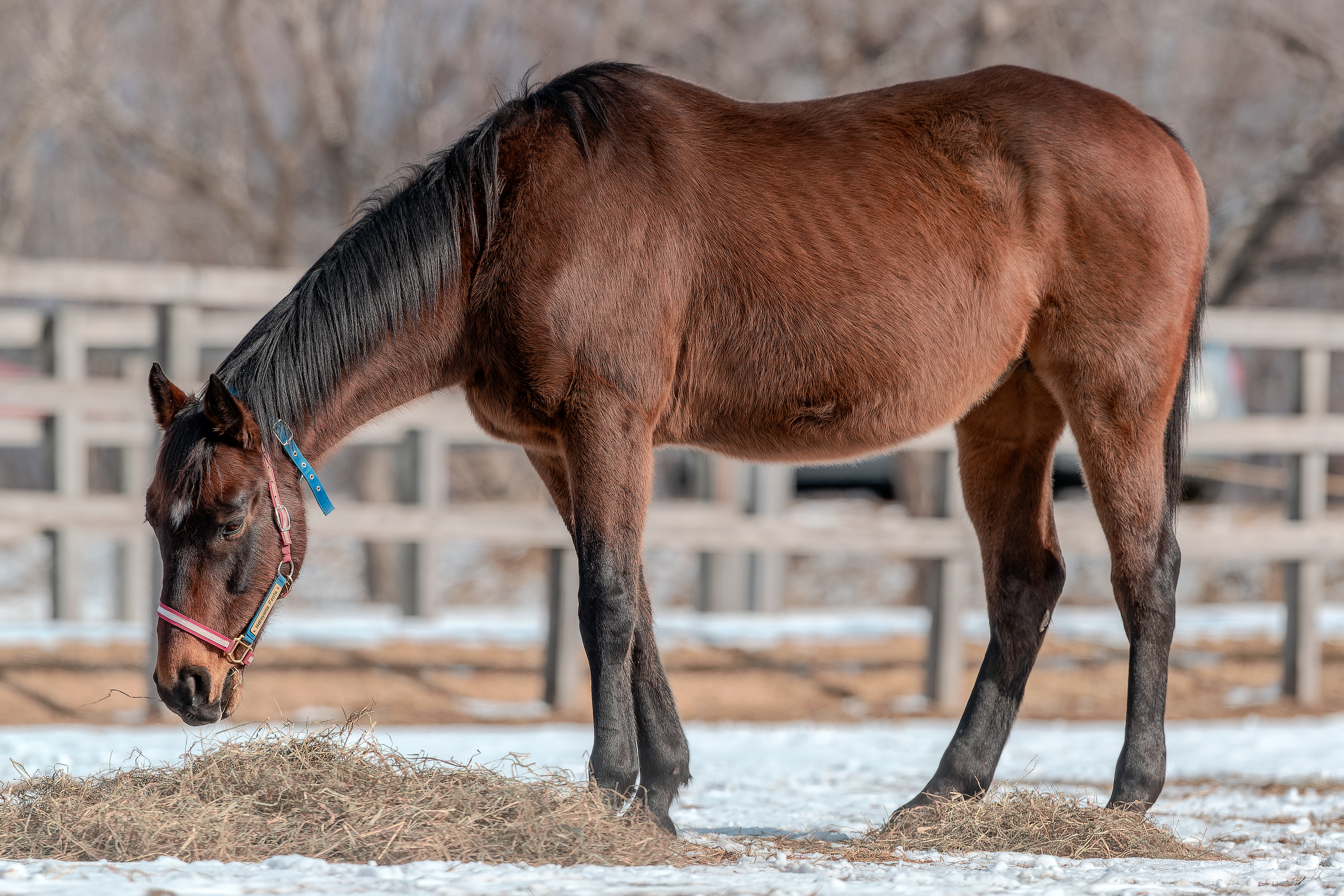
Nakayama Festa in February 2024

Nakayama Festa was retired from racing in October 2011 to stand at the Breeders Stallion Station in Hidaka, Hokkaido for the 2012 breeding season. On the decision to retire Nakayama Festa, his trainer Yoshitaka Ninomiya remarked, "He doesn't have any injuries but we thought it was better for him to retire when his condition was good."

=== Notable progeny ===
c = colt, f = filly, g = gelding

Foaled	Name	Sex	Major Wins
2013	Ganko	c	Nikkei Sho
2017	Babbitt	c	St Lite Kinen, Radio Nikkei Sho

== Retirement and death ==
Nakayama Festa retired from stud duty in 2023 and was pensioned at the Urakawa Yushun Village AERU in Urakawa, Hokkaido. He died on August 23, 2026, at the age of 20 after becoming unable to stand due to weakness caused by an illness he had contracted earlier in the month.

== In popular culture ==
An anthropomorphized version of Nakayama Festa appears as a character in the Japanese multimedia franchise Umamusume: Pretty Derby, voiced by Shino Shimoji. She is depicted as a thrill-seeker with an addiction to gambling, with this being reflected in her skill set and one possible epithet rewarded requiring the player to take risky bets including succeeding at training with a substantial chance of failure and not failing any once in an entire playthrough. Her character is also depicted as having her passion for racing ignited by her former school teacher. She is friends with Gold Ship, whom she plays pranks together with as part of her thrill-seeking, with one of their regular victims being Fenomeno. She is also part of a friend group composed of people like her who admire Stay Gold called the "Gold Clan", which includes Gold Ship, Fenomeno, Orfevre, and Dream Journey, all of whose real-world counterparts are progenies of Stay Gold himself. The anthropomorphized Nakayama Festa was introduced to the global release of Umamusume: Pretty Derby in September 2026.

== Racing form ==
Nakayama Festa raced in 15 races resulting in five wins. The data available is based on JBIS and netkeiba.com.

Date	Track	Race	Grade	Distance (Condition)	Entry	HN	Odds (Favored)	Finish	Time	Margins	Jockey	Winner (Runner-up)
2008 – two-year-old season
Nov 2	Tokyo	2YO debut		1600m（Firm）	17	2	5.6（3）	1st	1:35.9	0.0	Hiroyuki Uchida	(Viva Miracolo)
Nov 22	Tokyo	Tokyo Sports Hai Nisai Stakes	3	1800m（Firm）	14	5	27.5（9）	1st	1:47.7	0.0	Masayoshi Ebina	(Break Run Out)
2009 – three-year-old season
Jan 18	Nakayama	Keisei Hai	3	2000m（Firm）	13	2	2.6（1）	2nd	2:02.7	0.0	Masayoshi Ebina	Early Robusto
Apr 19	Nakayama	Satsuki Sho	1	2000m（Firm）	18	7	24.2（6）	8th	2:00.1	1.4	Masayoshi Ebina	Unrivaled
May 31	Tokyo	Tokyo Yushun	1	2400m（Heavy）	18	7	25.1（9）	4th	2:34.5	0.8	Masayoshi Ebina	Logi Universe
Sep 20	Nakayama	St. Lite Kinen	2	2200m（Firm）	18	17	4.3（2）	1st	2:12.0	–0.1	Masayoshi Ebina	(Sacred Valley)
Oct 25	Kyoto	Kikuka Sho	1	3000m（Firm）	18	16	8.4（4）	12th	3:05.2	1.7	Masayoshi Ebina	Three Rolls
Dec 12	Chukyo	Chunichi Shimbun Hai	3	2000m（Firm）	15	10	5.0（3）	13th	1:59.5	2.1	Masayoshi Ebina	Earnestly
2010 – four-year-old season
Apr 24	Tokyo	Metropolitan Stakes	OP	2400m（Firm）	14	10	5.6（3）	1st	2:26.1	–0.3	Yoshitomi Shibata	(Top Coming)
Jun 27	Hanshin	Takarazuka Kinen	1	2200m（Good）	17	17	37.8（8）	1st	2:13.0	–0.1	Yoshitomi Shibata	(Buena Vista)
Sep 12	Longchamp	Prix Foy	2	2400m（Soft）	6	3	3.0（3）	2nd	2:36.0	0.1	Masayoshi Ebina	Duncan
Oct 3	Longchamp	Prix de l'Arc de Triomphe	1	2400m（Soft）	19	7	23.0 (10）	2nd	2:35.3	0.0	Masayoshi Ebina	Workforce
Nov 28	Tokyo	Japan Cup	1	2400m（Firm）	18	11	7.7 (2）	14th	2:26.1	0.9	Masayoshi Ebina	Rose Kingdom
2011 – five-year-old season
Sep 11	Longchamp	Prix Foy	2	2400m（Good）	4	3	7.0（3）	4th	2:32.6	0.4	Masayoshi Ebina	Sarafina
Oct 2	Longchamp	Prix de l'Arc de Triomphe	1	2400m（Good）	16	5	29.0 (10）	11th	2:26.4	2.0	Masayoshi Ebina	Danedream

Legend:
Turf

== Pedigree ==
Pedigree of Nakayama Festa
Sire Stay Gold 1994 dk.b.	Sunday Silence; 1986 dk.b.	Halo	Hail to Reason
Sire Stay Gold 1994 dk.b.	Sunday Silence; 1986 dk.b.	Halo	Cosmah
Sire Stay Gold 1994 dk.b.	Sunday Silence; 1986 dk.b.	Wishing Well	Understanding
Sire Stay Gold 1994 dk.b.	Sunday Silence; 1986 dk.b.	Wishing Well	Mountain Flower
Sire Stay Gold 1994 dk.b.	Golden Sash; 1988 ch.	Dictus	Sanctus
Sire Stay Gold 1994 dk.b.	Golden Sash; 1988 ch.	Dictus	Dronic
Sire Stay Gold 1994 dk.b.	Golden Sash; 1988 ch.	Dyna Sash	Northern Taste
Sire Stay Gold 1994 dk.b.	Golden Sash; 1988 ch.	Dyna Sash	Royal Sash
Dam Dear Wink 1998 b.	Tight Spot; 1987 b.	His Majesty	Ribot
Dam Dear Wink 1998 b.	Tight Spot; 1987 b.	His Majesty	Flower Bowl
Dam Dear Wink 1998 b.	Tight Spot; 1987 b.	Premium Win	Lyphard
Dam Dear Wink 1998 b.	Tight Spot; 1987 b.	Premium Win	Classic Perfection
Dam Dear Wink 1998 b.	Seirei; 1991 b.	Danehill	Danzig
Dam Dear Wink 1998 b.	Seirei; 1991 b.	Danehill	Razyana
Dam Dear Wink 1998 b.	Seirei; 1991 b.	Sense of Rhythm	Cure the Blues
Dam Dear Wink 1998 b.	Seirei; 1991 b.	Sense of Rhythm	Sensibility
