= Snow Fairy =

Irish-bred Thoroughbred racehorse

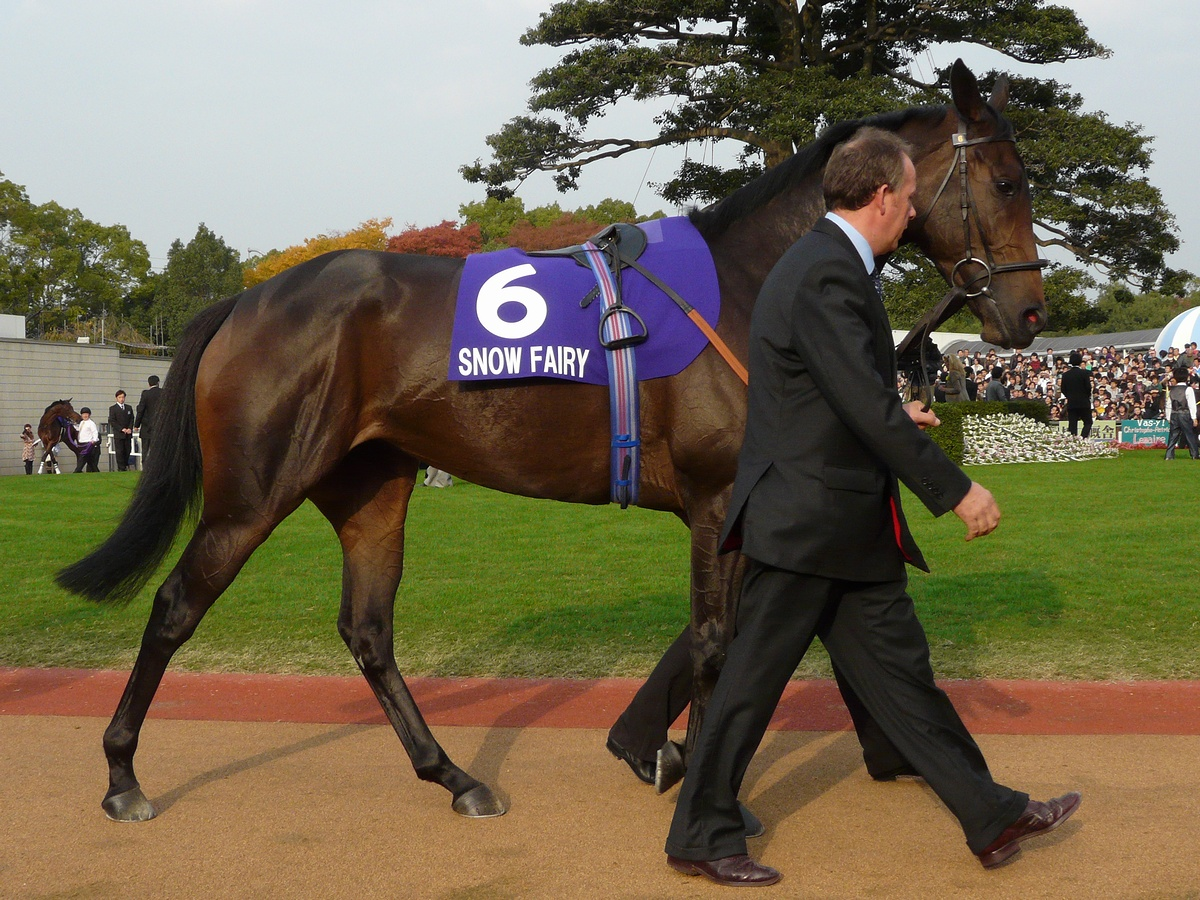
- Sire: Intikhab
- Grandsire: Red Ransom
- Dam: Woodland Dream
- Damsire: Charnwood Forest
- Sex: Mare
- Foaled: 2007
- Country: Ireland
- Colour: Bay
- Breeder: Windflower Overseas Holdings
- Owner: Anamoine Ltd.
- Trainer: Ed Dunlop
- Record: 21:8-4-4
- Earnings: £3,911,804

Major wins
- Epsom Oaks (2010); Irish Oaks (2010); Queen Elizabeth II Cup (2010, 2011); Hong Kong Cup (2010); Irish Champion Stakes (2012)

Awards
- European Champion Three-Year-Old Filly (2010)
- Last updated on 17-07-2013

Snow Fairy (foaled 12 February 2007) is a retired Thoroughbred racehorse who was bred in Ireland and trained in England by Ed Dunlop. She made little impression on the racecourse as a two-year-old, winning only one race out of six. She started her three-year-old season well, winning a listed race. Snow Fairy then started The Oaks at 12/1. Ridden by Ryan Moore, she won by a neck. Again ridden by Moore, she won the Irish Oaks easily. When taking on older horses for the first time in the Yorkshire Oaks, she finished second to Midday. Following a run in the St Leger, she went to Japan and won the Queen Elizabeth II Commemorative Cup followed by the Hong Kong Cup. As a four-year-old in 2011, she won the Queen Elizabeth II Commemorative Cup for a second time, but also placed in a number of top races, including third in the Arc de Triomphe and second in the Irish Champion Stakes. She stayed in training for the 2012 season and won the G1 Prix Jean Romanet at Deauville in August (later disqualified), and then the Irish Champion Stakes at Leopardstown in September.

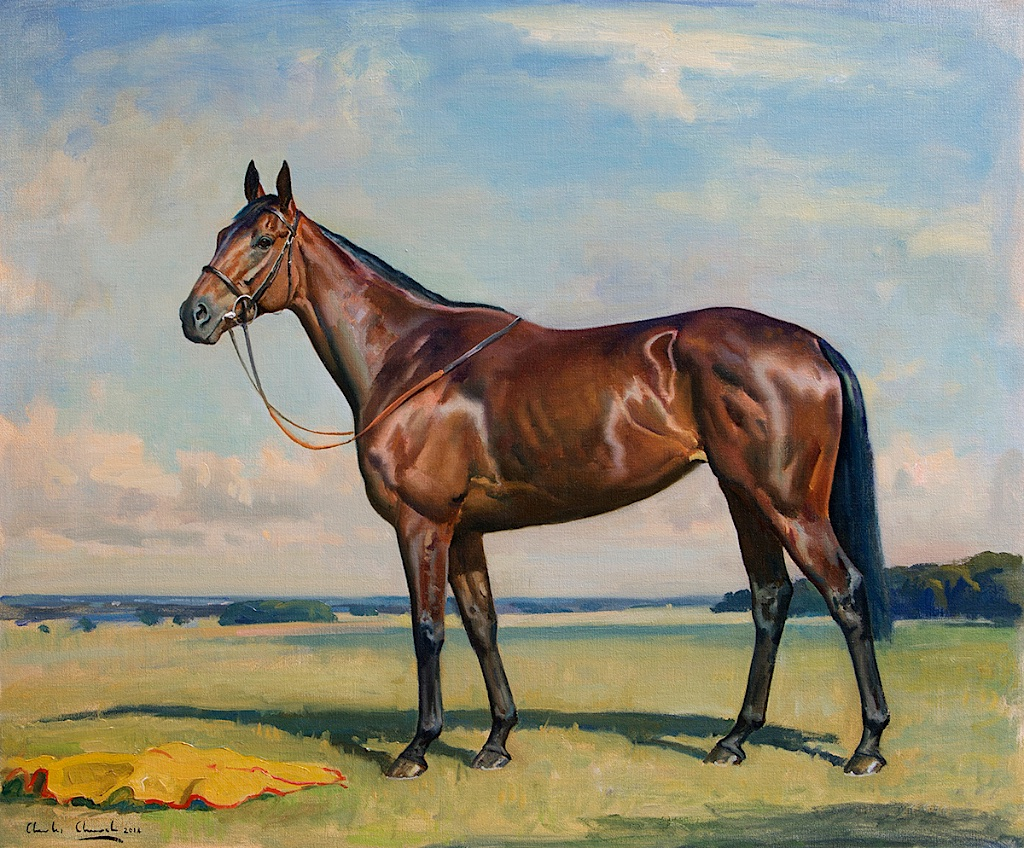
Snow Fairy: Epsom Oaks and Irish Oaks winner and one of the highest-earning racemares of all time, painting by Charles Church.

Snow Fairy was retired in July 2013 after aggravating a tendon injury. Her owner announced that the filly would be sent to Islanmore Stud in County Limerick for breeding.

== Breeding record ==
- 2015 Belle de Neige (IRE): filly by Elusive Pimpernel (USA)
- 2017 Virgin Snow (GB): filly by Gleneagles
- 2018 John Leeper (IRE): colt by Frankel
