= 1985 Prix de l'Arc de Triomphe =

- Location: Longchamp Racecourse
- Date: October 6, 1985
- Winning horse: Rainbow Quest

The 1985 Prix de l'Arc de Triomphe was a horse race held at Longchamp on Sunday 6 October 1985. It was the 64th running of the Prix de l'Arc de Triomphe.

The winner was Rainbow Quest, a four-year-old colt trained in Great Britain by Jeremy Tree. The winning jockey was Pat Eddery. Sagace finished first by a neck from Rainbow Quest with Kozana two lengths away in third. After a steward's inquiry and an objection from the rider of the runner-up, the places of the first two horses was reversed.

The winning time was 2m 29.5s.

== Race details ==
- Sponsor: Trusthouse Forte
- Purse:
- Going: Good to firm
- Distance: 2,400 metres
- Number of runners: 15
- Winner's time: 2m 29.5s

== Full result ==
Pos.	Marg.	Horse	Age	Jockey	Trainer (Country)
2		Rainbow Quest	4	Pat Eddery	Jeremy Tree (GB)
1d	nk	Sagace	5	Éric Legrix	Patrick Biancone (FR)
3	2	Kozana	3	Alain Lequeux	Alain de Royer-Dupré (FR)
4	nk	Sumayr	3	Yves Saint-Martin	Alain de Royer-Dupré (FR)
5	1	Fitnah	3	Freddy Head	Criquette Head (FR)
6	2½	Balitou	6	Dominique Boeuf	Patrick Biancone (FR)
7	hd	Don Orazio	3	M Jerome	F Jovine (ITY)
8	ns	Jupiter Island	5	Tony Ives	Clive Brittain (GB)
9	6	Galla Placidia	3	Lester Piggott	André Fabre (FR)
10	1	Iades	3	Cash Asmussen	François Boutin (FR)
11		Kiliniski	3	Willie Carson	John Dunlop (GB)
12		Badinage	5	Henri Samani	Charles Bartholomew (FR)
13		Shernazar	4	Walter Swinburn	Michael Stoute (GB)
14		Complice	4	Alfred Gibert	L Bates (FR)
15		Heraldiste	3	Gerald Mosse	Patrick Biancone (FR)

- Abbreviations: shd = short-head; nk = neck

== Winner's details ==
Further details of the winner, Rainbow Quest.

- Sex: Colt
- Foaled: 15 May 1981
- Country: United States
- Sire: Blushing Groom; Dam: I Will Follow (Herbager)
- Owner: Khalid Abdullah
- Breeder: Alan Clore
