= Mill Reef =

American-bred Thoroughbred racehorse (1968–1986)

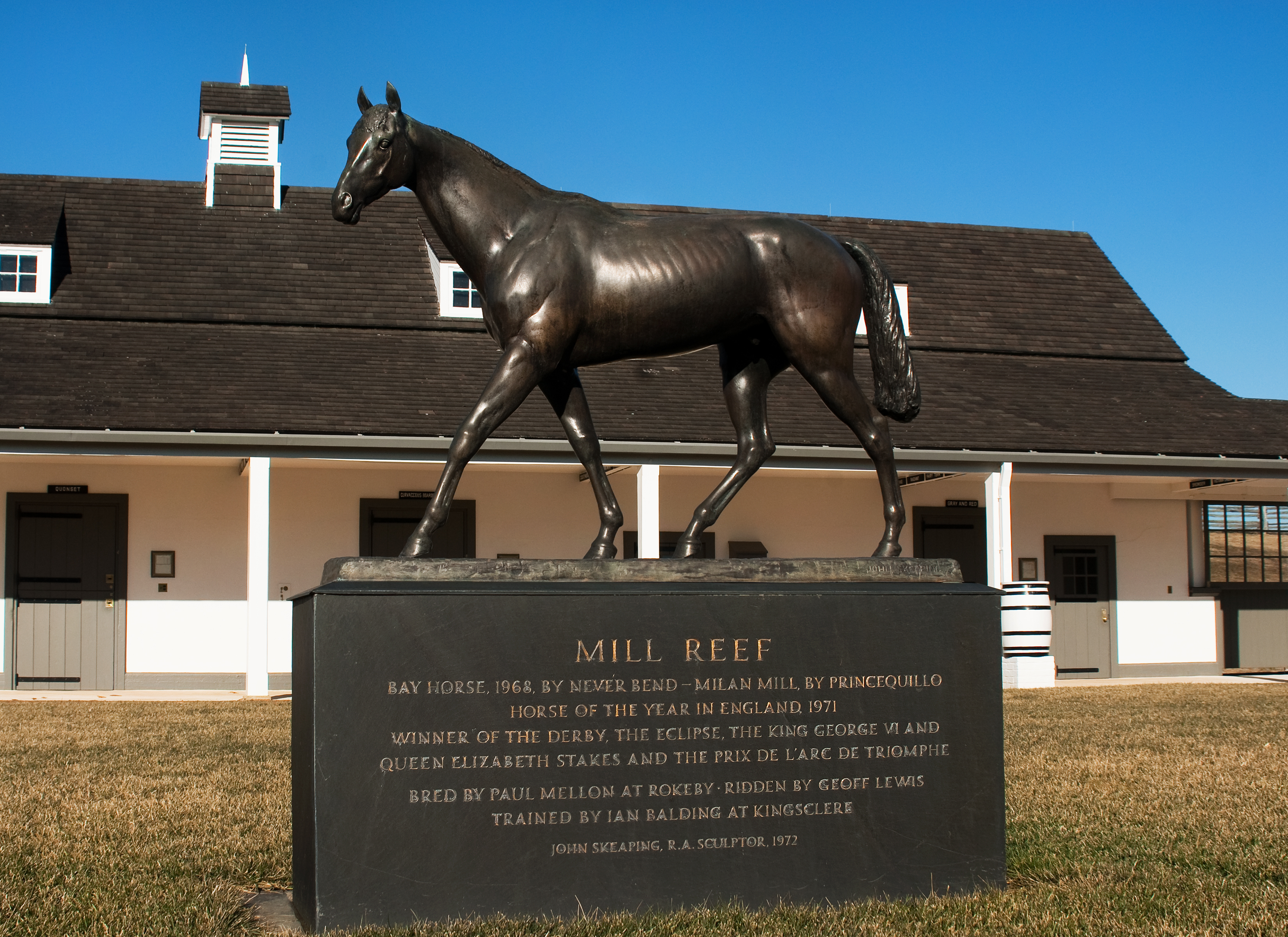
- This statue of Mill Reef stands in the centre of Rokeby Stables in Upperville, Virginia
- Sire: Never Bend
- Grandsire: Nasrullah
- Dam: Milan Mill
- Damsire: Princequillo
- Sex: Stallion
- Foaled: 1968
- Country: United States
- Colour: Bay
- Breeder: Paul Mellon
- Owner: Paul Mellon Colours: Black, gold cross and stripe on cap.
- Trainer: Ian Balding
- Record: 14:12-2-0
- Earnings: £309,225

Major wins
- Coventry Stakes (1970); Gimcrack Stakes (1970); Dewhurst Stakes (1970); Greenham Stakes (1971); Epsom Derby (1971); Eclipse Stakes (1971); K. George VI & Q. Elizabeth Stakes (1971); Prix de l'Arc de Triomphe (1971); Prix Ganay (1972); Coronation Cup (1972)

Awards
- English 3-Yr-Old Champion Colt (1971); European Horse of the Year (1971); English Champion Older Horse (1972); Timeform rating: 141; Leading sire in GB & Ireland (1978, 1987)

Honours
- #4 - 20th Century's Top 100 European Racehorses; Life-size statue at The National Stud, Newmarket; Mill Reef Stakes at Newbury Racecourse
- Last updated on 10 April 2024

Mill Reef (23 February 1968 – 2 February 1986) was an American-bred, British-trained Thoroughbred racehorse and sire. In a three-year career from 1970 to 1972, he won twelve of fourteen races and finished second in the other two. The horse was an outstanding two-year-old in 1970 but proved even better at three, winning the Epsom Derby, the Eclipse Stakes, the King George VI and Queen Elizabeth Stakes and the Prix de l'Arc de Triomphe. He won both his starts as a four-year-old before his racing career was ended by a severely broken leg that threatened his life. At just under 16 hands as a three-year-old, Mill Reef is considered one of the greatest thoroughbreds to run in Europe since WWII.

He recovered from a complicated operation on his broken leg to become a very successful stallion.

== Background ==
Mill Reef was bred in the United States at the Rokeby Stables in Virginia of his owner and breeder, philanthropist Paul Mellon. He was a son of Never Bend out of the mare Milan Mill by Princequillo. When he was a yearling, it was thought that his action would be a better fit for a career on the turf courses of Europe rather than the dirt tracks in America. Therefore, he was sent to England in December 1969 to be trained by Paul Mellon's young English trainer Ian Balding at Kingsclere. He was ridden by Geoff Lewis in all of his fourteen races. Mellon named the horse after the Mill Reef Club, on the island of Antigua in the West Indies and of which Paul Mellon was an early member. The Mellon family has maintained a home at Mill Reef since its founding in 1947.

As a yearling, Mill Reef showed himself to be an exceptional talent. Once, whilst visiting the stables and watching the yearlings being put through their paces on the Kingsclere gallops, the noted former amateur jockey and journalist Lord Oaksey asked, "Who's that?" to which Balding replied, "That is Mill Reef!" He proved himself an outstanding two-year-old in 1970.

== Racing career ==
=== 1970: two-year-old season ===
Mill Reef made his debut in May in the Salisbury Stakes at Salisbury, where he beat the previous winner and 2-9 favourite, the Lester Piggott-ridden Fireside Chat, by four lengths. He then went to Royal Ascot winning the Coventry Stakes by six lengths, and the decision was made to go to France for the Prix Robert Papin at Maisons-Laffitte. After an arduous journey, Mill Reef tasted defeat for the first time by the narrowest of margins to another exceptional English two-year-old, My Swallow.

Back on home soil, he was entered in the Gimcrack Stakes at York in mid August. After a torrential overnight downpour turned the going into a quagmire, his trainer wanted to scratch him from the race. However, after discussions with his owner prior to the race, Paul Mellon said, "Let him run, I've a feeling it will be alright." Mill Reef won by ten lengths from Green God (who was crowned champion sprinter the following year). In his next race, he beat the filly Hecla by a length in the Imperial Stakes at Kempton . In his final race of the season, he won the prestigious Dewhurst Stakes at Newmarket by four lengths.

In a crop of outstanding two-year-olds, Mill Reef was rated 1 lb below his French conqueror My Swallow, who remained unbeaten in seven races including all of France's top two-year-old races, and 1 lb ahead of the unbeaten Middle Park Stakes winner, Brigadier Gerard.

=== 1971: three-year-old season ===
As a three-year-old, following a victory in the Greenham Stakes at Newbury, Mill Reef was beaten three lengths in the 2,000 Guineas by Brigadier Gerard, who was to prove himself one of the best milers ever, with his old rival My Swallow back in third.

Although his breeding hinted otherwise, Mill Reef then proved himself to be the outstanding middle distance racehorse of the year, winning the Derby by two lengths from Linden Tree, the Eclipse Stakes at Sandown (beating the French colt Caro by four lengths) and the King George VI and Queen Elizabeth Stakes at Ascot by six lengths from Derby Italiano winner Ortis.

In October, he was victorious in the Prix de l'Arc de Triomphe at Longchamp in France, beating the French filly Pistol Packer by three lengths.

=== 1972: four-year-old season ===
Kept in training as a four-year-old, Mill Reef returned to Longchamp to win the Prix Ganay in April 1972 by ten lengths. A summer rematch with Brigadier Gerard, who had also been kept in training as a four-year-old, was earmarked for the Eclipse Stakes at Sandown. But after a narrow win in the Coronation Cup at Epsom Downs, by a neck from Homeric, Mill Reef was found to be suffering from a heavy virus and the rematch had to be postponed.

After his recovery, Mill Reef was trained for an autumn campaign and a return to the Prix de l'Arc de Triomphe in October. During a routine training gallop, however, on 30 August he stumbled and shattered his foreleg. Charles Allen, a veterinary specialist, was flown in. Mill Reef's fracture was complicated. A triangularly shaped piece of bone about two and a half inches long was broken from the lower end of the cannon bone and was considerably displaced. The inner sesamoid bone was completely shattered and the rim of the top of the main pastern bone was damaged. It seemed likely that the inner sesamoid bone was the first to break, with the result on the next step that the fetlock was not braced and the foot and the pastern were pointing outwards. The sheer pressure of the horse's weight caused the crumbling of the rim of the pastern bone and the breaking of the cannon bone.

It was decided that an operation would be performed in a building in Ian Balding's yard. Over a span of six hours, a simplified stainless-steel compression plate held by three screws was used to pin the broken pieces to the cannon bone. The injuries on the sesamoid bone or the rim of the pastern were avoided. The operation was successful. Professor Edwin James Roberts performed the operation and Mill Reef's life was saved. His stable lad, John Hallum, played a major role in nursing him for three months, six weeks of which saw the horse in plaster. After the painstaking operation, Mill Reef's racing career was over and he became a stallion at The National Stud in Newmarket in 1973.

== Stud career ==
Mill Reef's descendants include:

c = colt, f = filly

Foaled	Name	Sex	Major Wins
1975	Shirley Heights	c	Epsom Derby, Irish Derby
1975	Acamas	c	Prix Lupin, Prix du Jockey Club
1975	Mill George	c	Sire of multiple notable horses in Japan
1978	Fairy Footsteps	c	1000 Guineas Stakes
1978	Glint of Gold	c	Gran Criterium, Derby Italiano, Grand Prix de Paris
1979	Diamond Shoal	c	Gran Premio di Milano, Grand Prix de Saint-Cloud, Grosser Preis von Baden
1979	Pas de Seul	c	Prix de la Forêt
1980	Wassl	c	Irish 2,000 Guineas
1981	Lashkari	c	Breeders' Cup Turf
1984	Ibn Bey	c	Gran Premio d'Italia, Preis von Europa, Grosser Preis von Berlin, Irish St. Leger
1984	Milligram	f	Queen Elizabeth II Stakes
1984	Star Lift	c	Prix Royal-Oak
1984	Reference Point	c	Vertem Futurity Trophy, Epsom Derby, King George VI and Queen Elizabeth Stakes, St Leger Stakes
1985	Doyoun	c	2000 Guineas Stakes
1986	Creator	c	Prix Ganay, Prix d'Ispahan

== Death ==
Mill Reef was euthanised on 2 February 1986 and he is buried within the National Stud, where a statue stands in his memory.

== Assessment, honours and awards ==
Mill Reef was given a rating of 141 by Timeform and is listed at no. 4 in the greatest racehorses of the twentieth century.

The Mill Reef Stakes at Newbury is named in his honour.

The following is inscribed on the plinth beneath his statue at the National Stud:

Swift as a bird I flew down many a course.
Princes, Lords, Commoners all sang my praise.
In victory or defeat I played my part.
Remember me, all men who love the Horse,
If hearts and spirits flag in after days;
Though small, I gave my all. I gave my heart.
(from Paul Mellon's speech at the Gimcrack Dinner 1970).

The Royal Veterinary College's Hawkshead Campus in Hertfordshire has a dedicated pathology building in memory of Mill Reef named the "Mill Reef Building".

== Other references ==
Indian leg-spinner B. S. Chandrasekhar’s quicker ball was called the Mill Reef, a testimony to its pace. He famously used it to bowl John Edrich in the Oval Test match of 1971.

== Pedigree ==
Pedigree of Mill Reef
Sire Never Bend	Nasrullah	Nearco	Pharos
Sire Never Bend	Nasrullah	Nearco	Nogara
Sire Never Bend	Nasrullah	Mumtaz Begum	Blenheim
Sire Never Bend	Nasrullah	Mumtaz Begum	Mumtaz Mahal
Sire Never Bend	Lalun	Djeddah	Djebel
Sire Never Bend	Lalun	Djeddah	Djezima
Sire Never Bend	Lalun	Be Faithful	Bimelech
Sire Never Bend	Lalun	Be Faithful	Bloodroot
Dam Milan Mill	Princequillo	Prince Rose	Rose Prince
Dam Milan Mill	Princequillo	Prince Rose	Indolence
Dam Milan Mill	Princequillo	Cosquilla	Papyrus
Dam Milan Mill	Princequillo	Cosquilla	Quick Thought
Dam Milan Mill	Virginia Water	Count Fleet	Reigh Count
Dam Milan Mill	Virginia Water	Count Fleet	Quickly
Dam Milan Mill	Virginia Water	Red Ray	Hyperion
Dam Milan Mill	Virginia Water	Red Ray	Infra Red
