= Workforce (horse) =

British-bred Thoroughbred racehorse

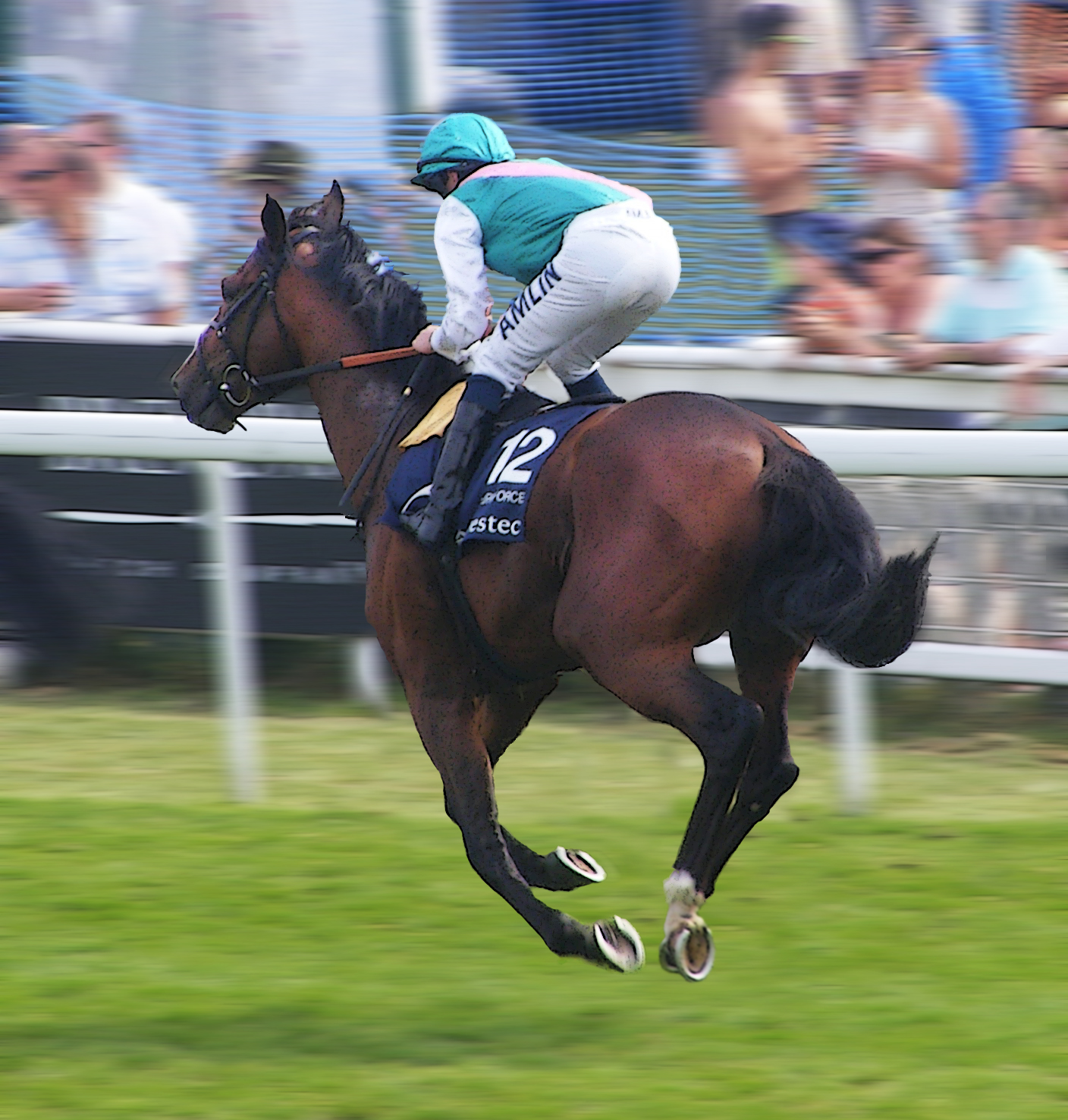
- Workforce at 2010 Epsom Derby.
- Sire: King's Best
- Grandsire: Kingmambo
- Dam: Soviet Moon
- Damsire: Sadler's Wells
- Sex: Stallion
- Foaled: 2007
- Country: Great Britain
- Colour: Bay with white blaze
- Breeder: Juddmonte Farms Ltd
- Owner: Khalid Abdullah
- Trainer: Sir Michael Stoute
- Jockey: Ryan Moore
- Record: 9:4-3-0
- Earnings: £1,184,768 €2,285,600

Major wins
- Epsom Derby (2010); Prix de l'Arc de Triomphe (2010); Brigadier Gerard Stakes (2011)

Awards
- European Champion Three-year-old Colt (2010)
- Last updated on 24 July 2010

Workforce (foaled 2007) is a British retired Thoroughbred racehorse and breeding stallion. In a career that lasted from September 2009 until October 2011, he ran nine times and won four races. In 2010 he won the 2010 Epsom Derby and Prix de l'Arc de Triomphe, ridden by Ryan Moore. He won once from four races in 2011 before being retired to stand as a breeding stallion in Japan.

== Pedigree ==
A white-blazed bay colt, Workforce was owned by Khalid Abdullah, having been bred by the Prince's farm Juddmonte Farms Ltd. He was trained for the Prince by the Newmarket-based Sir Michael Stoute. Workforce was foaled on 14 March 2007 to the dam Soviet Moon (IRE) by the stallion King's Best (USA), with the dam's sire being Sadler's Wells (USA). Soviet Moon was a sister of the St. Leger Stakes winner Brian Boru and the Hardwicke Stakes winner Sea Moon.

== Racing career ==
Workforce won his first race as a juvenile at Goodwood. As the 3–1 favourite in the seven-furlong race, he beat the second-placed finisher Oasis Dancer by six lengths. He finished the race going away, reportedly showing a "remarkable turn of foot" according to Will Hayler of The Guardian. Further race preparation was then hampered by an infection picked up early in 2010, although the trainer was always confident the horse was a potential Derby winner following his first "eye-opening" outing, describing him as "brimful of promise".

=== 2010: Three-year-old season ===
On 13 May 2010, again ridden by Ryan Moore, Workforce finished second in the Derby warm-up race the Dante Stakes at York. Losing by more than three lengths to Cape Blanco, the performance was said to have been affected by his metal bit becoming displaced. Trainer Stoute also suggested Workforce would have preferred slightly softer ground in the race, pointing out he was still "a once-raced baby".

After the York race, Workforce was practised at Lingfield Park in preparation for the Epsom race, and the trainer's confidence in the colt remained high, describing him as "very straightforward mentally". Having only raced twice, Workforce was duly entered into the 2010 Derby as one of the least experienced horses in the field.

==== 2010 Epsom Derby ====
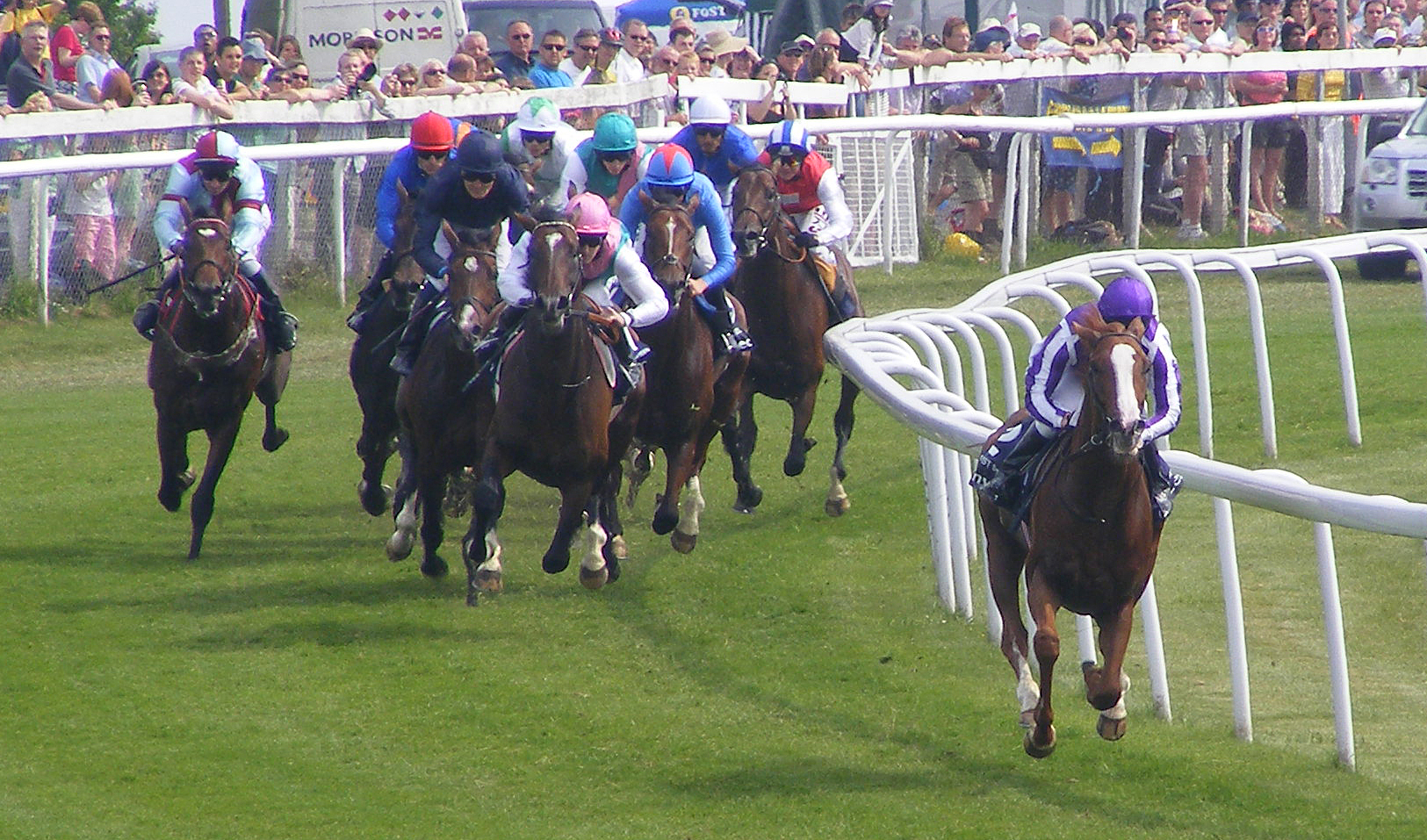
Workforce (6th from left in the green cap – Prince Khalid Abdullah's second colours) behind At First Sight at 2010 Epsom Derby.

On 5 June 2010, being ridden for the third time by Ryan Moore, Workforce won the 2010 Epsom Derby by seven lengths, breaking the Epsom Downs track record in the process. With a finishing time of 2m 31.33s, he beat the previous track record of 2m 32.31s set by Lammtarra in the 1995 Derby. Only two horses had ever won the Derby by a larger distance, Shergar by ten lengths in 1981, and Manna by eight in 1925. In addition to setting a new course record, the win was also the first time a horse that had been beaten in the Dante Stakes had gone on to win the Derby. Workforce carried his owner's second colours, with a distinguishing green cap, the first colours being carried by Bullet Train, a horse who later became best known as the pacemaker for his younger brother Frankel.

Workforce won the race having caught the pacemaker and early leader, the 100–1 long shot At First Sight, inside the two-furlong mark. At First Sight had looked to be going for a surprise win heading into the final straight ahead of the other 11 horses, before the 6–1 Workforce produced a powerful surge to win the race by seven lengths, with the 9–4 priced favourite, Jan Vermeer, finishing in fourth. Workforce ran the race with a cross noseband, as a precaution against the earlier misplaced metal bit.

Moore said of the race, "I may have sent him past the leader sooner than I needed to and I didn't let up on him much after that. But the way he quickened to get there was remarkable and he just didn't stop quickening".

==== King George VI & Queen Elizabeth Stakes ====
Prince Khalid Abdullah's racing colours.

Workforce's next outing was on 24 July 2010 at Ascot. Still being ridden by Ryan Moore, the horse came fifth in the mile-and-a-half long King George VI and Queen Elizabeth Stakes, having entered the race as the 8–11 favourite and as the experts pick due to the earlier Derby win. The eventual winner was, in fact, Workforce's stablemate, Harbinger, also trained by Michael Stoute, who set a new course record time and winning distance in the process.

With two furlongs to go in the race, Workforce and Cape Blanco were leading the six-horse field, when they were said to have been passed with ease by the 4–1 entry Harbinger who "coasted home" after running the last quarter mile alone. Moore was said to have eased Workforce off toward the line, and the horse eventually finished fifth, only ahead of the pacemaker.

Moore put the loss down to the horse not settling as he had done in the Derby, and due to the fast ground. Moore said of the performance that Workforce had "run badly before and come back from it and will again", while Stoute said it was disappointing. The Ascot run was described as "nothing like his Derby performance" by Marcus Armytage in The Daily Telegraph.

==== 2010 Prix de l'Arc de Triomphe ====
After much discussion about whether Workforce would run in the 2010 Prix de l'Arc de Triomphe, the decision was made on the Thursday prior to the race to run. In the race itself, he settled back in the field before running through the middle of the field to take the lead halfway up the straight, and held on to win by a head from Japanese runner Nakayama Festa.

=== 2011: Four-year-old season ===
Unlike most recent Derby and Arc winners, Workforce remained in training for the 2011 season. He won the Group 3 Brigadier Gerard Stakes at Sandown on 26 May. In his next start he was beaten by half a length in the Coral Eclipse Stakes by ex-Australian champion So You Think. This was followed by another attempt at the King George at Ascot, where he ran second behind Nathaniel, after hanging badly left across the width of the Ascot straight. On his final racecourse appearance, Workforce attempted to become the first horse since Alleged in 1978 to win consecutive runnings of the Arc de Triomphe. He started fourth choice in the betting at odds of 10/1 but was never in contention and finished twelfth behind Danedream.

=== Retirement ===
On 14 November 2011 Prince Khalid Abdullah's racing manager, Teddy Grimthorpe, announced that Workforce would be retired to stud at Shadai Stud in Japan.

== Pedigree ==
Pedigree of Workforce
Sire King's Best	Kingmambo	Mr. Prospector	Raise a Native
Sire King's Best	Kingmambo	Mr. Prospector	Gold Digger
Sire King's Best	Kingmambo	Miesque	Nureyev
Sire King's Best	Kingmambo	Miesque	Pasadoble
Sire King's Best	Allegretta	Lombard	Agio
Sire King's Best	Allegretta	Lombard	Promised Lady
Sire King's Best	Allegretta	Anatevka	Espresso
Sire King's Best	Allegretta	Anatevka	Alymra
Dam Soviet Moon	Sadler's Wells	Northern Dancer	Nearctic
Dam Soviet Moon	Sadler's Wells	Northern Dancer	Natalma
Dam Soviet Moon	Sadler's Wells	Fairy Bridge	Bold Reason
Dam Soviet Moon	Sadler's Wells	Fairy Bridge	Special
Dam Soviet Moon	Eva Luna	Alleged	Hoist The Flag
Dam Soviet Moon	Eva Luna	Alleged	Princess Pout
Dam Soviet Moon	Eva Luna	Media Luna	Star Appeal
Dam Soviet Moon	Eva Luna	Media Luna	Sounion
