= Prix de l'Arc de Triomphe =

Flat horse race in France

- Class: Group 1
- Location: Longchamp Racecourse; Paris, France
- Inaugurated: 1920
- Race type: Flat / Thoroughbred
- Sponsor: Qatar
- Website: Official website

Race information
- Distance: 2,400 metres (1 mile 4 furlongs)
- Surface: Turf
- Track: Right-handed
- Qualification: Three-years-old and up (Geldings excluded through 2026)
- Weight: 56.5 kg (3yo); 59.5 kg (4yo+); Allowances; 1.5 kg for fillies and mares
- Purse: €5,000,000 (2024); 1st: €2,857,000

Prix de l'Arc de Triomphe
2026
Daryz	Bay City Roller	Diamond Necklace

Previous years
2025
Daryz	Minnie Hauk	Sosie
2024
Bluestocking	Aventure	Los Angeles
2023
Ace Impact	Westover	Onesto
2022
Alpinista	Vadeni	Torquator Tasso
2021
Torquator Tasso	Tarnawa	Hurricane Lane

2020–2011
2020
Sottsass	In Swoop	Persian King
2019
Waldgeist	Enable	Sottsass
2018
Enable	Sea of Class	Cloth of Stars
2017
Enable	Cloth of Stars	Ulysses
2016
Found	Highland Reel	Order of St George
2015
Golden Horn	Flintshire	New Bay
2014
Treve	Flintshire	Taghrooda
2013
Treve	Orfevre	Intello
2012
Solemia	Orfevre	Masterstroke
2011
Danedream	Shareta	Snow Fairy

2010–2001
2010
Workforce	Nakayama Festa	Sarafina
2009
Sea the Stars	Youmzain	Cavalryman
2008
Zarkava	Youmzain	Soldier of Fortune
2007
Dylan Thomas	Youmzain	Sagara
2006
Rail Link	Pride	Hurricane Run
2005
Hurricane Run	Westerner	Bago
2004
Bago	Cherry Mix	Ouija Board
2003
Dalakhani	Mubtaker	High Chaparral
2002
Marienbard	Sulamani	High Chaparral
2001
Sakhee	Aquarelliste	Sagacity

2000–1991
2000
Sinndar	Egyptband	Volvoreta
1999
Montjeu	El Condor Pasa	Croco Rouge
1998
Sagamix	Leggera	Tiger Hill
1997
Peintre Celebre	Pilsudski	Borgia
1996
Helissio	Pilsudski	Oscar Schindler
1995
Lammtarra	Freedom Cry	Swain
1994
Carnegie	Hernando	Apple Tree
1993
Urban Sea	White Muzzle	Opera House
1992
Subotica	User Friendly	Vert Amande
1991
Suave Dancer	Magic Night	Pistolet Bleu

1990–1981
1990
Saumarez	Epervier Bleu	Snurge
1989
Carroll House	Behera	Saint Andrews
1988
Tony Bin	Mtoto	Boyatino
1987
Trempolino	Tony Bin	Triptych
1986
Dancing Brave	Bering	Triptych
1985
Rainbow Quest	Sagace	Kozana
1984
Sagace	Northern Trick	All Along
1983
All Along	Sun Princess	Luth Enchantee
1982
Akiyda	Ardross	Awaasif
1981
Gold River	Bikala	April Run

1980–1978
1980
Detroit	Argument	Ela-Mana-Mou
1979
Three Troikas	Le Marmot	Troy
1978
Alleged	Trillion	Dancing Maid

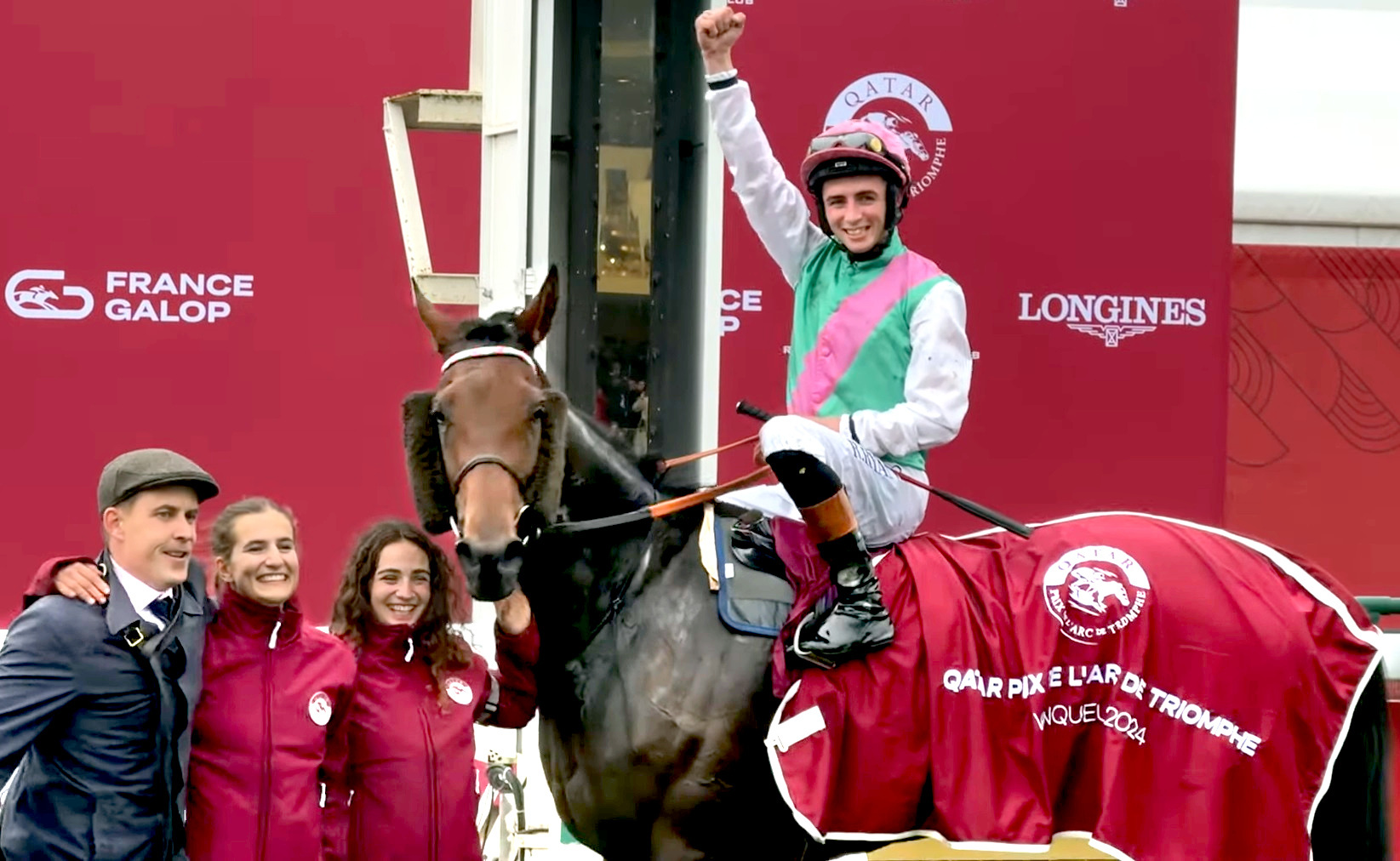
Bluestocking, the winner in 2024

The Prix de l'Arc de Triomphe (French pronunciation: [pʁi də laʁk də tʁijɔ̃f]) is a Group 1 flat horse race in France open to thoroughbreds aged three years or older. It is run at Longchamp Racecourse in Paris over a distance of 2,400 metres (1 mile 4 furlongs). The race is scheduled to take place each year in the autumn, usually on the first Sunday in October.

With prize money of €5 million, the Prix de l'Arc de Triomphe, often referred to as the Arc, is Europe's richest flat race. The prize money and prestige attract international entries and the race is broadcast live in 60 countries. Since 2008 the Arc has been sponsored by Qatar. In 2026, the Japanese company Cygames became a premium partner of the Arc.

== History ==
=== Origins ===
The Société d'Encouragement, a former governing body of French racing, had initially restricted its races to thoroughbreds born and bred in France. In 1863, it launched the Grand Prix de Paris, an event designed to bring together the best three-year-olds from any country. Thirty years later, it introduced the Prix du Conseil Municipal, an international race for the leading horses of different age groups. It was run over 2,400 metres in October, with weights determined by a horse's previous performances.

The creation of a third such race was proposed at a committee meeting on 24 January 1920. The new event would complement the Grand Prix de Paris and serve as a showcase for French thoroughbred breeding. It would have similar characteristics to the Prix du Conseil Municipal, but each horse would compete on equal terms, unpenalised for previous victories.

Coming in the wake of World War I, it was decided that the race would be named after the Arc de Triomphe, a famous monument which had been the scene of a victory parade by the Allies in 1919. The chosen title had been previously assigned to a minor event at Longchamp. Another suggested title was the "Prix de la Victoire".

=== Race history ===
The Prix de l'Arc de Triomphe was first run on Sunday, 3 October 1920. The inaugural running was won by Comrade, a three-year-old colt owned by Evremond de Saint-Alary. The winner's prize was 150,000 francs.

In 1935, the event secured state funding by the means of a Sweepstake. The system was first used in 1936, and it continued until 1938. The race was cancelled twice during World War II, in 1939 and 1940. It was run at Le Tremblay with a distance of 2,300 metres in 1943 and 1944.

Government funding of the race resumed in 1949, with money obtained through the Loterie Nationale. Offering a jackpot of 50 million francs, this enabled a rapid increase of the prizes for both the Arc and its supporting races. By the 1970s, however, the assistance of the lottery had diminished, and the system was finally discontinued after the 1982 running. Since then, the race has had several sponsors, including Trusthouse Forte, CIGA Hotels and Groupe Lucien Barrière.

Since 2008, the race has been sponsored by Qatar. The Arc weekend includes seven races classed at Group 1 level, and four with Group 2 status. It also features the Arabian World Cup, the world's richest race for purebred Arabian horses, with €1 million in prize money.

Due to renovations at the Hippodrome de Longchamp, the 2016 and 2017 editions of the race took place at Chantilly.

==== Gelding restriction removed (2027) ====
In June 2026, France Galop announced the removal of restrictions for geldings to enter the Arc starting in 2027. The decision was formally approved by the European Pattern Committee later that year.

In a race that has long been viewed as essential to promoting thoroughbred breeding, discussions about allowing geldings to run in the Arc intensified in the years leading up to the decision. In the two years before the decision was announced, top horses Goliath and Calandagan, both trained by Francis-Henri Graffard, were unable to run in the race because of the restriction. In 2024 John Stewart, co-owner of Goliath, called for the removal of the gelding restriction in the Arc, arguing that "if fillies are permitted to compete without any assurances regarding their fertility, it appears inconsistent to exclude exceptional horses simply due to being gelded."

Henri Bozo, who bred Diamond Necklace (third in the 2026 Arc), set up a petition after the running of the 2026 Arc to reverse the decision of France Galop. The petition received support from trainer Aidan O'Brien and Coolmore Stud, the latter stating that the petition seeks to preserve the race's "tradition, prestige and importance to the future of thoroughbred breeding." Coolmore owner John Magnier said in June 2026 that he hoped geldings would not be allowed into the race. "There are two sides to every coin but I’m only giving it from the breeding side and from the breed as a whole," he said at the time. "The Arc is one of the real races and it won’t be any more if you include geldings."

== Records ==
Most successful horse (2 wins):

- Ksar – 1921, 1922
- Motrico – 1930, 1932
- Corrida – 1936, 1937
- Tantieme – 1950, 1951
- Ribot – 1955, 1956
- Alleged – 1977, 1978
- Treve – 2013, 2014
- Enable – 2017, 2018
- Daryz – 2025, 2026

Leading jockey (6 wins):

- Frankie Dettori – Lammtarra (1995), Sakhee (2001), Marienbard (2002), Golden Horn (2015), Enable (2017, 2018)

Leading trainer (8 wins):

- André Fabre – Trempolino (1987), Subotica (1992), Carnegie (1994), Peintre Celebre (1997), Sagamix (1998), Hurricane Run (2005), Rail Link (2006), Waldgeist (2019)

Leading owner (6 wins):

- Marcel Boussac – Corrida (1936, 1937), Djebel (1942), Ardan (1944), Caracalla (1946), Coronation (1949)
- Khalid Abdullah – Rainbow Quest (1985), Dancing Brave (1986), Rail Link (2006), Workforce (2010), Enable (2017, 2018)

Fastest winning time – Found (2016), 2m 23.61s (at Chantilly)

Widest winning margin – Ribot (1956), Sea Bird (1965) and Sakhee (2001), 6 lengths

Oldest winning horse – Motrico (1932), aged 7 years

Most runners – 30, in 1967

Fewest runners – 7, in 1941

== Winners ==
Year	Winner	Age	Jockey	Trainer	Owner	Time	Country
1920	Comrade	3	Frank Bullock	Peter Gilpin	Evremond de Saint-Alary	2:39.00	United Kingdom
1921	Ksar	3	George Stern	Walter Walton	Mrs Edmond Blanc	2:34.80	France
1922	Ksar	4	Frank Bullock	Walter Walton	Mrs Edmond Blanc	2:38.80	France
1923	Parth	3	Frank O'Neill	James Crawford	A. Kingsley Macomber	2:38.20	United Kingdom
1924	Massine	4	Albert Sharpe	Elijah Cunnington	Henry Ternynck	2:40.80	France
1925	Priori ^{[a]}	3	Marcel Allemand	Percy Carter	Gérard de Chavagnac	2:33.80	France
1926	Biribi	3	Domingo Torterolo	Juan Torterolo	Simon Guthmann	2:32.80	France
1927	Mon Talisman	3	Charles Semblat	Frank Carter	Edouard Martinez de Hoz	2:32.80	France
1928	Kantar	3	Arthur Esling	Richard Carver	Ogden Mills	2:38.80	France
1929	Ortello	3	Paolo Caprioli	Willy Carter	Giuseppe de Montel	2:42.80	Italy
1930	Motrico	5	Marcel Fruhinsholtz	Maurice d'Okhuysen	Max de Rivaud	2:44.80	France
1931	Pearl Cap	3	Charles Semblat	Frank Carter	Diana Esmond	2:38.80	France
1932	Motrico	7	Charles Semblat	Maurice d'Okhuysen	Max de Rivaud	2:44.60	France
1933	Crapom	3	Paolo Caprioli	Federico Regoli	Mario Crespi	2:41.60	Italy
1934	Brantôme	3	Charles Bouillon	Lucien Robert	Édouard de Rothschild	2:41.80	France
1935	Samos	3	Wally Sibbritt	Frank Carter	Evremond de Saint-Alary	2:42.60	France
1936	Corrida	4	Charlie Elliott	John Watts	Marcel Boussac	2:38.60	France
1937	Corrida	5	Charlie Elliott	John Watts	Marcel Boussac	2:33.90	France
1938	Eclair au Chocolat	3	Charles Bouillon	Lucien Robert	Édouard de Rothschild	2:39.80	France
1939	no race due to World War II
1940	no race due to World War II
1941	Le Pacha	3	Paul Francolon	John Cunnington Sr.	Philippe Gund	2:36.20	France
1942	Djebel	5	Jacques Doyasbère	Charles Semblat	Marcel Boussac	2:37.90	France
1943	Verso II ^{[b]}	3	Guy Duforez	Charles Clout	Hubert de Chambure	2:33.40	France
1944	Ardan ^{[c]}	3	Jacques Doyasbère	Charles Semblat	Marcel Boussac	2:35.00	France
1945	Nikellora	3	Rae Johnstone	René Pelat	Mrs Robert Patureau	2:34.80	France
1946	Caracalla	4	Charlie Elliott	Charles Semblat	Marcel Boussac	2:33.30	France
1947	Le Paillon	5	Fernand Rochetti	William Head	Lucienne Aurousseau	2:33.40	France
1948	Migoli	4	Charlie Smirke	Frank Butters	HH Aga Khan III	2:31.60	United Kingdom
1949	Coronation	3	Roger Poincelet	Charles Semblat	Marcel Boussac	2:33.20	France
1950	Tantieme	3	Jacques Doyasbère	François Mathet	François Dupré	2:34.20	France
1951	Tantieme	4	Jacques Doyasbère	François Mathet	François Dupré	2:32.80	France
1952	Nuccio	4	Roger Poincelet	Alec Head	HH Aga Khan III	2:39.80	France
1953	La Sorellina	3	Maurice Larraun	Etienne Pollet	Paul Duboscq	2:31.80	France
1954	Sica Boy	3	Rae Johnstone	Pierre Pelat	Mrs Jean Cochery	2:36.30	France
1955	Ribot	3	Enrico Camici	Ugo Penco	Mario Incisa Rocchetta	2:35.60	Italy
1956	Ribot	4	Enrico Camici	Ugo Penco	Mario Incisa Rocchetta	2:34.80	Italy
1957	Oroso	4	Serge Boullenger	Daniel Lescalle	Raoul Meyer	2:33.40	France
1958	Ballymoss	4	Scobie Breasley	Vincent O'Brien	John McShain	2:37.90	Ireland
1959	Saint Crespin ^{[d]}	3	George Moore	Alec Head	Prince Aly Khan	2:33.30	France
1960	Puissant Chef	3	Maxime Garcia	Mick Bartholomew	Henry Aubert	2:44.00	France
1961	Molvedo	3	Enrico Camici	Arturo Maggi	Egidio Verga	2:38.40	Italy
1962	Soltikoff	3	Marcel Depalmas	René Pelat	Simone del Duca	2:30.90	France
1963	Exbury	4	Jean Deforge	Geoffroy Watson	Guy de Rothschild	2:35.00	France
1964	Prince Royal	3	Roger Poincelet	Georges Bridgland	Rex Ellsworth	2:35.50	France
1965	Sea Bird	3	Pat Glennon	Etienne Pollet	Jean Ternynck	2:35.50	France
1966	Bon Mot	3	Freddy Head	William Head	Walter Burmann	2:39.80	France
1967	Topyo	3	Bill Pyers	Mick Bartholomew	Suzy Volterra	2:38.20	France
1968	Vaguely Noble	3	Bill Williamson	Etienne Pollet	Wilma Franklyn	2:35.20	France
1969	Levmoss	4	Bill Williamson	Seamus McGrath	Seamus McGrath	2:29.00	Ireland
1970	Sassafras	3	Yves Saint-Martin	François Mathet	Arpad Plesch	2:29.70	France
1971	Mill Reef	3	Geoff Lewis	Ian Balding	Paul Mellon	2:28.30	United Kingdom
1972	San San	3	Freddy Head	Angel Penna	Countess Batthyany	2:28.30	France
1973	Rheingold	4	Lester Piggott	Barry Hills	Henry Zeisel	2:35.80	United Kingdom
1974	Allez France	4	Yves Saint-Martin	Angel Penna	Daniel Wildenstein	2:36.90	France
1975	Star Appeal	5	Greville Starkey	Theo Grieper	Waldemar Zeitelhack	2:33.60	Germany
1976	Ivanjica	4	Freddy Head	Alec Head	Jacques Wertheimer	2:39.40	France
1977	Alleged	3	Lester Piggott	Vincent O'Brien	Robert Sangster	2:30.60	Ireland
1978	Alleged	4	Lester Piggott	Vincent O'Brien	Robert Sangster	2:36.50	Ireland
1979	Three Troikas	3	Freddy Head	Criquette Head	Ghislaine Head	2:28.90	France
1980	Detroit	3	Pat Eddery	Olivier Douieb	Robert Sangster	2:28.00	France
1981	Gold River	4	Gary W. Moore	Alec Head	Jacques Wertheimer	2:35.20	France
1982	Akiyda	3	Yves Saint-Martin	François Mathet	HH Aga Khan IV	2:37.00	France
1983	All Along	4	Walter Swinburn	Patrick Biancone	Daniel Wildenstein	2:28.10	France
1984	Sagace	4	Yves Saint-Martin	Patrick Biancone	Daniel Wildenstein	2:39.10	France
1985	Rainbow Quest ^{[e]}	4	Pat Eddery	Jeremy Tree	Khalid Abdullah	2:29.50	United Kingdom
1986	Dancing Brave	3	Pat Eddery	Guy Harwood	Khalid Abdullah	2:27.70	United Kingdom
1987	Trempolino	3	Pat Eddery	André Fabre	Moussac / McNall	2:26.30	France
1988	Tony Bin	5	John Reid	Luigi Camici	Veronica del Bono Gaucci	2:27.30	Italy
1989	Carroll House	4	Michael Kinane	Michael Jarvis	Antonio Balzarini	2:30.80	United Kingdom
1990	Saumarez	3	Gérald Mossé	Nicolas Clément	McNall / Gretzky	2:29.80	France
1991	Suave Dancer	3	Cash Asmussen	John Hammond	Henri Chalhoub	2:31.40	France
1992	Subotica	4	Thierry Jarnet	André Fabre	Olivier Lecerf	2:39.00	France
1993	Urban Sea	4	Éric Saint-Martin	Jean Lesbordes	David Tsui	2:37.90	France
1994	Carnegie	3	Thierry Jarnet	André Fabre	Sheikh Mohammed	2:31.10	France
1995	Lammtarra	3	Frankie Dettori	Saeed bin Suroor	Saeed bin M. Al Maktoum	2:31.80	United Kingdom
1996	Helissio	3	Olivier Peslier	Élie Lellouche	Enrique Sarasola	2:29.90	France
1997	Peintre Celebre	3	Olivier Peslier	André Fabre	Daniel Wildenstein	2:24.60	France
1998	Sagamix	3	Olivier Peslier	André Fabre	Jean-Luc Lagardère	2:34.50	France
1999	Montjeu	3	Michael Kinane	John Hammond	Michael Tabor	2:38.50	France
2000	Sinndar	3	Johnny Murtagh	John Oxx	HH Aga Khan IV	2:25.80	Ireland
2001	Sakhee	4	Frankie Dettori	Saeed bin Suroor	Godolphin	2:36.10	United Kingdom
2002	Marienbard	5	Frankie Dettori	Saeed bin Suroor	Godolphin	2:26.70	United Kingdom
2003	Dalakhani	3	Christophe Soumillon	Alain de Royer-Dupré	HH Aga Khan IV	2:32.30	France
2004	Bago	3	Thierry Gillet	Jonathan Pease	Niarchos Family	2:25.00	France
2005	Hurricane Run	3	Kieren Fallon	André Fabre	Michael Tabor	2:27.40	France
2006	Rail Link	3	Stéphane Pasquier	André Fabre	Khalid Abdullah	2:26.30	France
2007	Dylan Thomas	4	Kieren Fallon	Aidan O'Brien	Magnier / Tabor	2:28.50	Ireland
2008	Zarkava	3	Christophe Soumillon	Alain de Royer-Dupré	HH Aga Khan IV	2:28.80	France
2009	Sea the Stars	3	Michael Kinane	John Oxx	Christopher Tsui	2:26.30	Ireland
2010	Workforce	3	Ryan Moore	Sir Michael Stoute	Khalid Abdullah	2:35.30	United Kingdom
2011	Danedream	3	Andrasch Starke	Peter Schiergen	Burg Eberstein / Yoshida	2:24.49	Germany
2012	Solemia	4	Olivier Peslier	Carlos Laffon-Parias	Wertheimer et Frère	2:37.68	France
2013	Treve	3	Thierry Jarnet	Criquette Head	Joaan al Thani	2:32:04	France
2014	Treve	4	Thierry Jarnet	Criquette Head	Al Shaqab Racing	2:26.05	France
2015	Golden Horn	3	Frankie Dettori	John Gosden	Anthony Oppenheimer	2:27.23	United Kingdom
2016	Found^{[f]}	4	Ryan Moore	Aidan O'Brien	Tabor, Smith & Magnier	2:23.61	Ireland
2017	Enable	3	Frankie Dettori	John Gosden	Khalid Abdullah	2:28.69	United Kingdom
2018	Enable	4	Frankie Dettori	John Gosden	Khalid Abdullah	2:29.24	United Kingdom
2019	Waldgeist	5	Pierre-Charles Boudot	André Fabre	Gestut Ammerland / Newsells Park	2:31.99	France
2020	Sottsass	4	Cristian Demuro	Jean-Claude Rouget	White Birch Farm	2:39.30	France
2021	Torquator Tasso	4	Rene Piechulek	Marcel Weiss	Gestüt Auenquelle	2:37.62	Germany
2022	Alpinista	5	Luke Morris	Sir Mark Prescott	Kirsten Rausing	2:35.71	United Kingdom
2023	Ace Impact	3	Cristian Demuro	Jean-Claude Rouget	Serge Stempniak / Gousserie Racing	2:25.50	France
2024	Bluestocking	4	Rossa Ryan	Ralph Beckett	Juddmonte	2:31.58	United Kingdom
2025	Daryz	3	Mickael Barzalona	Francis-Henri Graffard	Aga Khan Stud SC	2:29.17	France
2026	Daryz	4	Mickael Barzalona	Francis-Henri Graffard	Aga Khan Stud SC	2:27.11	France

^{a} Cadum finished first in 1925, but he was relegated to second place for hampering Priori.
^{b} ^{c} The 1943 and 1944 editions were run at Le Tremblay over 2,300 metres.
^{d} Midnight Sun dead-heated for first in 1959, but he was placed second for hampering Saint Crespin.
^{e} Sagace finished first in 1985, but he was demoted to second for bumping Rainbow Quest.
^{f} The 2016 and 2017 runnings took place at Chantilly while Longchamp was closed for redevelopment.

== Analysis ==
Wins by country foaled
1. France – 49 wins

Ksar (1921, 1922), Massine (1924), Priori (1925), Biribi (1926), Mon Talisman (1927), Kantar (1928), Motrico (1930, 1932), Pearl Cap (1931), Brantôme (1934), Samos (1935), Corrida (1936, 1937), Eclair au Chocolat (1938), Le Pacha (1941), Djebel (1942), Verso II (1943), Ardan (1944), Nikellora (1945), Caracalla (1946), Le Paillon (1947), Coronation (1949), Tantieme (1950, 1951), La Sorellina (1953), Sica Boy (1954), Oroso (1957), Puissant Chef (1960), Soltikoff (1962), Exbury (1963), Sea Bird (1965), Bon Mot (1966), Topyo (1967), Sassafras (1970), Three Troikas (1979), Detroit (1980), Gold River (1981), All Along (1983), Sagace (1984), Subotica (1992), Helissio (1996), Sagamix (1998), Bago (2004), Treve (2013, 2014), Sottsass (2020), Daryz (2025, 2026)

2. (Republic of Ireland) Ireland – 20 wins

Parth (1923), Migoli (1948), Vaguely Noble (1968), Levmoss (1969), Rheingold (1973), Star Appeal (1975), Tony Bin (1988), Carroll House (1989), Carnegie (1994), Montjeu (1999), Sinndar (2000), Marienbard (2002), Dalakhani (2003), Hurricane Run (2005), Dylan Thomas (2007), Zarkava (2008), Sea the Stars (2009), Solemia (2012), Found (2016), Ace Impact (2023)

3. United States – 14 wins

Mill Reef (1971), San San (1972), Allez France (1974), Ivanjica (1976), Alleged (1977, 1978), Rainbow Quest (1985), Dancing Brave (1986), Trempolino (1987), Suave Dancer (1991), Urban Sea (1993), Lammtarra (1995), Peintre Celebre (1997), Sakhee (2001)

3. (United Kingdom) Great Britain – 14 wins

Comrade (1920), Ballymoss (1958), Saint Crespin (1959), Prince Royal (1964), Akiyda (1982), Saumarez (1990), Rail Link (2006), Workforce (2010), Golden Horn (2015), Enable (2017, 2018), Waldgeist (2019), Alpinista (2022), Bluestocking (2024)

5. Italy – 6 wins

Ortello (1929), Crapom (1933), Nuccio (1952), Ribot (1955, 1956), Molvedo (1961)

6. Germany – 2 win

Danedream (2011), Torquator Tasso (2021)

Wins by country trained
1. France – 71 wins

Ksar (1921, 1922), Massine (1924), Priori (1925), Biribi (1926), Mon Talisman (1927), Kantar (1928), Motrico (1930, 1932), Pearl Cap (1931), Brantôme (1934), Samos (1935), Corrida (1936, 1937), Eclair au Chocolat (1938), Le Pacha (1941), Djebel (1942), Verso II (1943), Ardan (1944), Nikellora (1945), Caracalla (1946), Le Paillon (1947), Coronation (1949), Tantieme (1950, 1951), Nuccio (1952), La Sorellina (1953), Sica Boy (1954), Oroso (1957), Saint Crespin (1959), Puissant Chef (1960), Soltikoff (1962), Exbury (1963), Prince Royal (1964), Sea Bird (1965), Bon Mot (1966), Topyo (1967), Vaguely Noble (1968), Sassafras (1970), San San (1972), Allez France (1974), Ivanjica (1976), Three Troikas (1979), Detroit (1980), Gold River (1981), Akiyda (1982), All Along (1983), Sagace (1984), Trempolino (1987), Saumarez (1990), Suave Dancer (1991), Subotica (1992), Urban Sea (1993), Carnegie (1994), Helissio (1996), Peintre Celebre (1997), Sagamix (1998), Montjeu (1999), Dalakhani (2003), Bago (2004), Hurricane Run (2005), Rail Link (2006), Zarkava (2008), Solemia (2012), Treve (2013, 2014), Waldgeist (2019), Sottsass (2020), Ace Impact (2023), Daryz (2025, 2026)

2. (United Kingdom) Great Britain – 17 wins

Comrade (1920), Parth (1923), Migoli (1948), Mill Reef (1971), Rheingold (1973), Rainbow Quest (1985), Dancing Brave (1986), Carroll House (1989), Lammtarra (1995), Sakhee (2001), Marienbard (2002), Workforce (2010), Golden Horn (2015), Enable (2017, 2018), Alpinista (2022), Bluestocking (2024)

3. (Republic of Ireland) Ireland – 8 wins

Ballymoss (1958), Levmoss (1969), Alleged (1977, 1978), Sinndar (2000), Dylan Thomas (2007), Sea the Stars (2009), Found (2016)

4. Italy – 6 wins

Ortello (1929), Crapom (1933), Ribot (1955, 1956), Molvedo (1961), Tony Bin (1988)

5. Germany – 3 wins

Star Appeal (1975), Danedream (2011), Torquator Tasso (2021)

Wins by age and sex
1. Three-year-old colts – 49 wins

Comrade (1920), Ksar (1921), Parth (1923), Priori (1925), Biribi (1926), Mon Talisman (1927), Kantar (1928), Ortello (1929), Crapom (1933), Brantôme (1934), Eclair au Chocolat (1938), Le Pacha (1941), Verso II (1943), Ardan (1944), Tantieme (1950), Sica Boy (1954), Ribot (1955), Saint Crespin (1959), Puissant Chef (1960), Molvedo (1961), Soltikoff (1962), Prince Royal (1964), Sea Bird (1965), Bon Mot (1966), Topyo (1967), Vaguely Noble (1968), Sassafras (1970), Mill Reef (1971), Alleged (1977), Dancing Brave (1986), Trempolino (1987), Saumarez (1990), Suave Dancer (1991), Carnegie (1994), Lammtarra (1995), Helissio (1996), Peintre Celebre (1997), Sagamix (1998), Montjeu (1999), Sinndar (2000), Dalakhani (2003), Bago (2004), Hurricane Run (2005), Rail Link (2006), Sea the Stars (2009), Workforce (2010), Golden Horn (2015), Ace Impact (2023), Daryz (2025)

2. Four-year-old colts – 22 wins

Ksar (1922), Massine (1924), Caracalla (1946), Migoli (1948), Tantieme (1951), Nuccio (1952), Ribot (1956), Oroso (1957), Ballymoss (1958), Exbury (1963), Levmoss (1969), Rheingold (1973), Alleged (1978), Sagace (1984), Rainbow Quest (1985), Carroll House (1989), Subotica (1992), Sakhee (2001), Dylan Thomas (2007), Sottsass (2020), Torquator Tasso (2021), Daryz (2026)

3. Three-year-old fillies – 13 wins

Pearl Cap (1931), Samos (1935), Nikellora (1945), Coronation (1949), La Sorellina (1953), San San (1972), Three Troikas (1979), Detroit (1980), Akiyda (1982), Zarkava (2008), Danedream (2011), Treve (2013), Enable (2017)

4. Four-year-old fillies – 11 wins

Corrida (1936), Allez France (1974), Ivanjica (1976), Gold River (1981), All Along (1983), Urban Sea (1993), Solemia (2012), Treve (2014), Found (2016), Enable (2018), Bluestocking (2024)

4. Five-year-old-plus horses – 8 wins

Motrico (1930, 1932), Djebel (1942), Le Paillon (1947), Star Appeal (1975), Tony Bin (1988), Marienbard (2002), Waldgeist (2019)

6. Five-year-old-plus mares – 2 wins

Corrida (1937), Alpinista (2022)

Winner's previous race
(includes winners since 1970; horse won race unless stated)
- Prix Niel

Trempolino (1987), Carnegie (1994), Helissio (1996), Peintre Celebre (2nd, 1997), Sagamix (1998), Montjeu (1999), Sinndar (2000), Dalakhani (2003), Bago (3rd, 2004), Hurricane Run (2005), Rail Link (2006)

- Prix Vermeille

San San (1972), Three Troikas (1979), Detroit (3rd, 1980), Akiyda (2nd, 1982), Zarkava (2008), Solemia (3rd, 2012), Treve (2013, 2014 (4th)), Bluestocking (2024)

- Prix Foy

Allez France (1974), Gold River (3rd, 1981), All Along (2nd, 1983), Sagace (1984), Subotica (2nd, 1992), Waldgeist (2019), Daryz (2026)

- Irish Champion Stakes

Carroll House (1989), Suave Dancer (1991), Dylan Thomas (2007), Sea the Stars (2009), Golden Horn (2015), Found (2nd, 2016), Sottsass (4th, 2020)

- King George VI and Queen Elizabeth Stakes

Mill Reef (1971), Rainbow Quest (3rd, 1985), Lammtarra (1995), Workforce (5th, 2010)

- Grosser Preis von Baden

Star Appeal (4th, 1975), Marienbard (2002), Danedream (2011), Torquator Tasso (2021)

- Prix du Prince d'Orange

Ivanjica (1976), Alleged (1978), Saumarez (1990), Daryz (2nd, 2025)

- International Stakes

Rheingold (3rd, 1973), Sakhee (2001)

- Premio Federico Tesio

Tony Bin (1988)

- Prix Gontaut-Biron

Urban Sea (1993)

- Prix Guillaume d'Ornano

Ace Impact (2023)

- Prix Royal-Oak

Sassafras (1970)

- Select Stakes

Dancing Brave (1986)

- St. Leger Stakes

Alleged (2nd, 1977)

- Yorkshire Oaks

Enable (2017), Alpinista (2022)

- September Stakes

Enable (2018)

== See also ==
- List of French flat horse races
