= Lightening Pearl =

Irish-bred Thoroughbred racehorse

- Sire: Marju
- Grandsire: Last Tycoon
- Dam: Jioconda
- Damsire: Rossini
- Sex: Mare
- Foaled: 15 February 2009
- Country: Ireland
- Colour: Bay
- Breeder: Castlemartin Stud & Skymarc Farm
- Owner: Pearl Bloodstock
- Trainer: Ger Lyons
- Record: 7: 3-1-1
- Earnings: £137,846

Major wins
- Round Tower Stakes (2011); Cheveley Park Stakes (2011)

Lightening Pearl (foaled 15 February 2009) is an Irish Thoroughbred racehorse and broodmare. In a racing career which lasted from June 2011 and June 2012 she won three of her seven races. As a two-year-old she was one of the best fillies of her generation in Britain and Ireland, finishing third in the Debutante Stakes before winning the Round Tower Stakes and the Cheveley Park Stakes. She failed to reproduce her best form in two races as a three-year-old and was retired from racing.

== Background ==
Lightening Pearl is a dark bay mare with a small white star and a white sock on her left hind leg bred in Ireland by Castlemartin Stud & Skymarc Farm (Tony O'Reilly and his wife Chryss). Her sire Marju won the St James's Palace Stakes and finished second in The Derby in 1991 before being retired to stud. The best of his other progeny included Viva Pataca, Soviet Song and Indigenous. Lightening Pearl's dam Jioconda showed good form as a racemare in Ireland, winning two of her eight races including the Listed Silken Glider Stakes in 2005. She was a descendant of Pato, a mare whose other progeny included My Emma and Classic Cliche. Jioconda also produced Lightening Pearl's full brother Satono Crown.

In September 2010, the filly was consigned to the Goffs sale and was bought for €125,000 by Redvers on behalf of Fahad bin Abdulla Al Thani's Pearl Bloodstock Ltd. She was sent into training with Ger Lyons at Dunsany, County Meath.

== Racing career ==
=== 2011: two-year-old season ===
Lightening Pearl made her racecourse debut in a six furlong maiden race at Navan Racecourse on 15 June 2011. Ridden by Keagan Latham, she started a 16/1 outsider she stayed on in the closing stages to finish second of the eight runners behind the odds-on favourite Experience. On 4 July the filly started second favourite for a similar event at Roscommon Racecourse in which she was ridden for the first time by Johnny Murtagh. She took the lead soon after the start and kept on well to win by two lengths from the favorite Catamount. Lightening Pearl was moved up in class for the Group Two Debutante Stakes at the Curragh on 7 August. Ridden by Latham, the filly started at odds of 16/1 and finished third of the nine runners behind Maybe and the Dermot Weld-trained Yellow Rosebud. Murtagh resumed the ride three weeks later when the filly started 6/4 favourite for the Group Three Round Tower over the same course and distance. Lightening Pearl tracked the outsider Lady Pastrane before taking the lead two furlongs from the finish and drew away in the closing stages to win easily by five lengths from Experience. After the race Lyons said "She ran a great race last time when she was unlucky not to be second", Lyons said. "She was beaten by a very good filly that day and I think the fillies are better than the colts this year. She has done all we've asked of her".

On her final appearance of the year Lightening Pearl was sent to England to contest the Group One Cheveley Park Stakes over si furlongs at Newmarket Racecourse on 24 September. As she had not been one of the original entries her owner paid a £15,000 supplementary fee to run her in the race. The Richard Hannon-trained Best Terms started the 11/8 favourite after wins in the Queen Mary Stakes and the Lowther Stakes with Lightening Pearl, ridden by Murtagh, next in the betting on 3/1. The other seven runners included Shumoos (Sirenia Stakes), Sajwah (Dick Poole Fillies' Stakes), Angels Will Fall (Princess Margaret Stakes) and Miss Work of Art (Marygate Fillies' Stakes). Lightening Pearl tracked the leader Sajwah before taking the lead a quarter of a mile from the finish and went clear of her rivals entering the final furlongs. She held on the closing stages to win by half a length from the 33/1 outsider Sunday Times with Angels Will Fall in third. Her victory gave both her owner and trainer their first success at Group One level. Johnny Murtagh commented "From day one I always knew she was good. She won her maiden well and maybe the key was running over six furlongs. I always thought she was a mile seven-furlong filly, but she had the race won a long way out".

=== 2012: three-year-old season ===
On her first appearance as a three-year-old, Lightening Pearl returned to Newmarket for the 199th running of the 1000 Guineas over the Rowley Mile on 6 May. Starting a 20/1 outsider she chased the leaders and reached second place three furlongs out but soon began to struggle and was eased down by Murtagh to finish thirteenth of the sixteen runners behind Homecoming Queen. On June 14 the filly was dropped in class and distance for the Group Three Ballyogan Stakes over six furlongs at Leopardstown Racecourse. She started 4/1 second favourite but never looked likely to win and finished sixth of the nine runners behind Fire Lily. On the following day it was announced that Lightening Pearl had been retired from racing. Lyons said "She is a Group 1 winner and owes us nothing. I'm delighted to have trained her and I hope her progeny are as good. She just wasn't firing this year in the way she did last season. She didn't grow over the winter and we've accepted that she hasn't trained on".

== Pedigree ==
Pedigree of Lightening Pearl (IRE), bay filly, 2009
Sire Marju (IRE) 1988	Last Tycoon (IRE); 1983	Try My Best	Northern Dancer
Sire Marju (IRE) 1988	Last Tycoon (IRE); 1983	Try My Best	Sex Appeal
Sire Marju (IRE) 1988	Last Tycoon (IRE); 1983	Mill Princess	Mill Reef
Sire Marju (IRE) 1988	Last Tycoon (IRE); 1983	Mill Princess	Irish Lass
Sire Marju (IRE) 1988	Flame of Tara (IRE); 1980	Artaius	Round Table
Sire Marju (IRE) 1988	Flame of Tara (IRE); 1980	Artaius	Stylish Pattern
Sire Marju (IRE) 1988	Flame of Tara (IRE); 1980	Welsh Flame	Welsh Pageant
Sire Marju (IRE) 1988	Flame of Tara (IRE); 1980	Welsh Flame	Electric Flash
Dam Jioconda (IRE) 2003	Rossini (USA); 1997	Miswaki	Mr. Prospector
Dam Jioconda (IRE) 2003	Rossini (USA); 1997	Miswaki	Hopespringseternal
Dam Jioconda (IRE) 2003	Rossini (USA); 1997	Touch of Greatness	Hero's Honor
Dam Jioconda (IRE) 2003	Rossini (USA); 1997	Touch of Greatness	Ivory Wand
Dam Jioconda (IRE) 2003	La Joconde (GB); 1999	Vettori	Machiavellian
Dam Jioconda (IRE) 2003	La Joconde (GB); 1999	Vettori	Air Distingue
Dam Jioconda (IRE) 2003	La Joconde (GB); 1999	Lust	Pursuit of Love
Dam Jioconda (IRE) 2003	La Joconde (GB); 1999	Lust	Pato (Family: 20-c)
