= Bethrah =

Irish-bred Thoroughbred racehorse

- Sire: Marju
- Grandsire: Last Tycoon
- Dam: Reve d'Iman
- Damsire: Highest Honor
- Sex: Mare
- Foaled: 21 March 2007
- Country: Ireland
- Colour: Brown
- Breeder: Tullpark Ltd
- Owner: Hamdan Al Maktoum
- Trainer: Dermot Weld
- Record: 5: 3-0-0
- Earnings: £211,836

Major wins
- Derrinstown Stud 1,000 Guineas Trial (2010); Irish 1,000 Guineas (2010)

Bethrah (foaled 21 March 2007) is an Irish Thoroughbred racehorse and broodmare best known for winning the Irish 1,000 Guineas in 2010. After finishing unplaced on her only run as a two-year-old she reached her peak in the following spring, winning a maiden race and the Derrinstown Stud 1,000 Guineas Trial before taking the Irish 1000 Guineas. She was well beaten in her only subsequent race and was retired at the end of the year.

== Background ==
Bethrah is a brown mare with a small white star and a white sock on her left hind leg, bred in Ireland by Tullpark Ltd. As a foal in December 2007 she was put up for auction at Tattersalls but was bought back by Tullpark when the bidding stopped at 34,000 guineas. In September of the following year the yearling filly was entered in the Goffs Millian Sale and was bought for €160,000 by Hamdan Al Maktoum's Shadwell Estate. She was sent ito training with Dermot Weld and was ridden in all of her races by Pat Smullen.

She was sired by the Irish stallion Marju who finished second in The Derby and won the St James's Palace Stakes in 1991. Marju sired several other major winners including Soviet Song, My Emma, Viva Pataca, Indigenous and Satono Crown. Bethrah's dam Reve d'Iman showed little ability as a racehorse, finishing unplaced in all of her eight races. She was descendant of the influential British broodmare Point Duty (foaled 1926) who is the ancestor of many major winners including Sodium, Horse Chestnut and Madelia.

== Racing career ==
=== 2009: two-year-old season ===
On her only appearance as a two-year-old Bethrah was one of twenty horses to contest the Goffs Million Sprint over six furlongs at the Curragh on 27 September. Starting at odds of 20/1 she was reluctant to enter the stalls and finished tenth, behind the British-trained Lucky General, beaten six and a quarter lengths by the winner.

=== 2010: three-year-old season ===
Bethrah made her three-year-old debut in a maiden race over seven furlongs at Limerick Racecourse on 13 April and started the 4/9 favourite against five opponents. She took the lead from the start and drew away in the straight to win "comfortably" by three and a half lengths from Queen Commander. On 9 May the filly was stepped up in class and distance for the Group Three Derrinstown Stud 1,000 Guineas Trial over a mile at Leopardstown Racecourse. The joint-favourites were the Jim Bolger-trained Atasari (runner-up in the Rockfel Stakes) and the David Wachman-trained Picture Perfect with Bethrah the third choice in the betting on 5/1. After racing in fourth place she made steady progress in the straight, caught Atasari in the final strides and won by a neck.

Two weeks after her win at Leopardstown Bethrah started a 16/1 outsider in a nineteen-runner field for the Irish 1000 Guineas on good to firm ground at the Curragh. The British-trained filly Music Show started the 3/1 favourite ahead of Gile Na Greine (third in the 1000 Guineas) and Lolly For Dolly (Athasi Stakes) while the other runners included Lillie Langtry, Anna Salai (Prix de la Grotte), Termagant (Moyglare Stud Stakes), Lady Springbank (C L Weld Park Stakes, Leopardstown 1,000 Guineas Trial Stakes), Song of My Heart (Blenheim Stakes) and Atasari. The pacemakers Full of Hope and Queen of Troy made the running before Anna Salai went to the front a furlong and a half from the finish. At this point Bethrah, who had raced towards racing towards the rear of the field and been in eleventh place at half way, began to make rapid progress and was then switched to the right to make her challenge. In a "blanket finish" Bethrah caught Anna Salai in the final strides and won by a head with Music Show, Remember When and Lillie Langtry just behind: the first five finishers were covered by three quarters of a length. After the race Weld said "She is tough and very genuine, and has progressed over the winter. We’ve done a lot of work with her at the stalls, and she is a lot more confident these days and went in perfectly today". Discussing her future targets he added "we'll make a plan from there but she might go 10 furlongs next as I don't see her just limited to a mile".

After a break of over three months Bethrah returned in the Matron Stakes at Leopardstown on 4 September. After racing in third place she was unable to make any progress in the straight and finished fifth of the six runners behind Lillie Langtry.

== Breeding record ==
At the end of her racing career Bethrah became a broodmare for her owner's Shadwell Stud:

- Hawraa, a brown filly, foaled in 2012, sired by Dansili
- Alsinaafy, bay colt, 2013, by Oasis Dream. Unraced.
- Aldhara, bay filly, 2014, by Dubawi. Unraced.
- Mujid, bay colt, 2015, by Frankel

== Pedigree ==
Pedigree of Bethrah (IRE), brown mare, 2007
Sire Marju (IRE) 1988	Last Tycoon (IRE); 1983	Try My Best	Northern Dancer
Sire Marju (IRE) 1988	Last Tycoon (IRE); 1983	Try My Best	Sex Appeal
Sire Marju (IRE) 1988	Last Tycoon (IRE); 1983	Mill Princess	Mill Reef
Sire Marju (IRE) 1988	Last Tycoon (IRE); 1983	Mill Princess	Irish Lass
Sire Marju (IRE) 1988	Flame of Tara (IRE); 1980	Artaius	Round Table
Sire Marju (IRE) 1988	Flame of Tara (IRE); 1980	Artaius	Stylish Pattern
Sire Marju (IRE) 1988	Flame of Tara (IRE); 1980	Welsh Flame	Welsh Pageant
Sire Marju (IRE) 1988	Flame of Tara (IRE); 1980	Welsh Flame	Electric Flash
Dam Reve d'Iman (FR) 2001	Highest Honor (FR); 1983	Kenmare	Kalamoun
Dam Reve d'Iman (FR) 2001	Highest Honor (FR); 1983	Kenmare	Belle of Ireland
Dam Reve d'Iman (FR) 2001	Highest Honor (FR); 1983	High River	Riverman
Dam Reve d'Iman (FR) 2001	Highest Honor (FR); 1983	High River	Hairbrush
Dam Reve d'Iman (FR) 2001	Numidie (FR); 1988	Baillamont	Blushing Groom
Dam Reve d'Iman (FR) 2001	Numidie (FR); 1988	Baillamont	Lodeve
Dam Reve d'Iman (FR) 2001	Numidie (FR); 1988	Yamani	Green Dancer
Dam Reve d'Iman (FR) 2001	Numidie (FR); 1988	Yamani	Yeovil (Family: 1-p)
