= Marju =

Irish-bred Thoroughbred racehorse

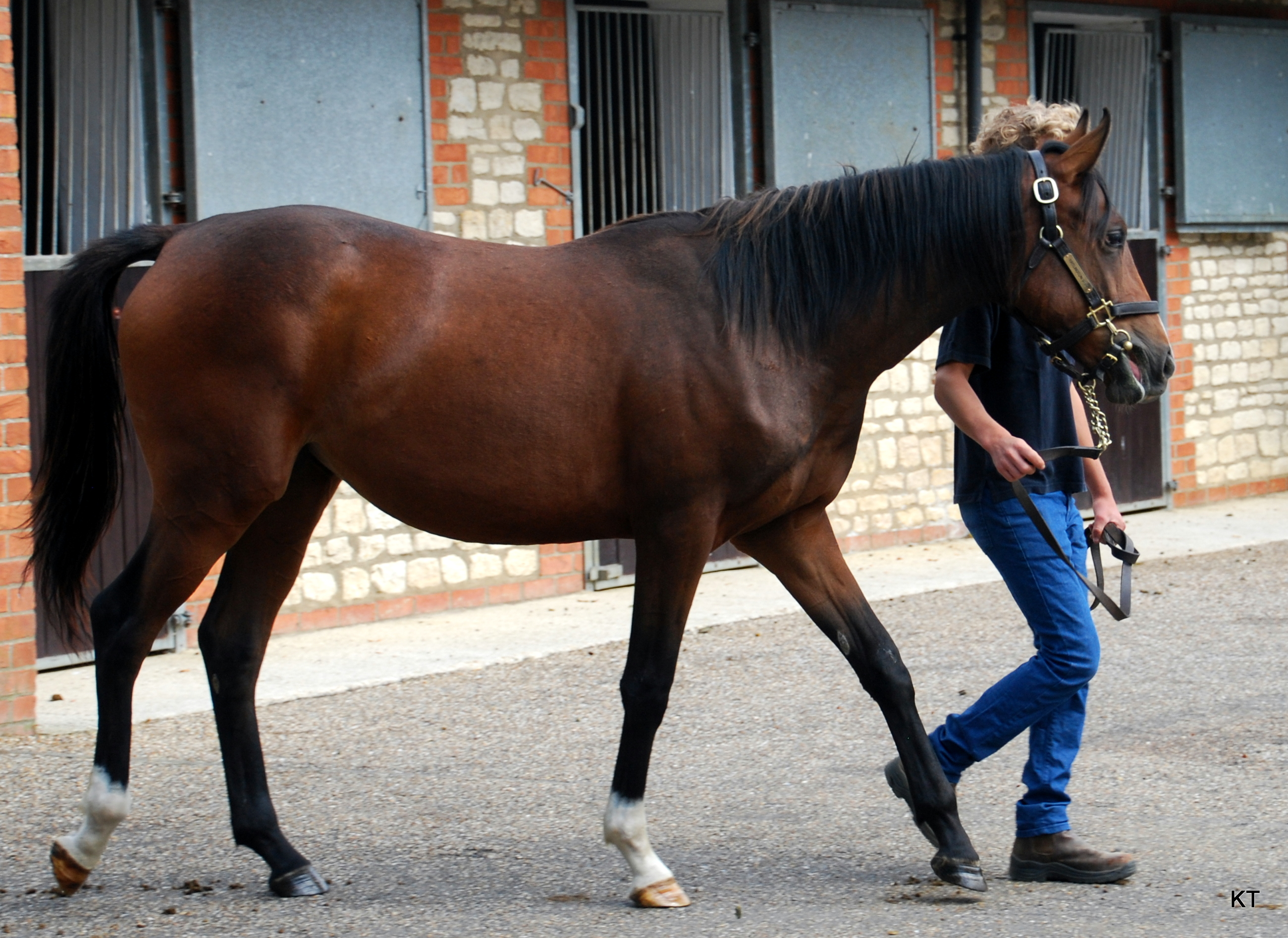
- Sire: Last Tycoon
- Grandsire: Try My Best
- Dam: Flame of Tara
- Damsire: Artaius
- Sex: Stallion
- Foaled: 1988
- Died: 11 October 2016 (aged 28)
- Country: Ireland
- Colour: Brown
- Breeder: Kilcarn Stud
- Owner: Hamdan bin Rashid Al Maktoum
- Trainer: John L. Dunlop
- Record: 7: 3-1-0
- Earnings: $471,029

Major wins
- Craven Stakes (1991); St. James's Palace Stakes (1991)
- Last updated on 26th of February, 2026

Marju (12 March 1988 – 11 October 2016) was a Thoroughbred racehorse and successful sire.

== Background ==
Marju was a dark bay or brown horse bred by Kilcarn Stud and owned by Hamdan Al Maktoum. He was sired by Last Tycoon out of Flame of Tara. He was a half-brother to Group One winner Salsabil.

Marju's sire Last Tycoon was a European champion sprinter and the winner of the Breeders' Cup Mile, the King's Stand Stakes, and the William Hill Sprint Championship, as well as being crowned English Champion Sprinter and French Champion Sprinter in 1986. He was a successful sire, siring Ezzoud, Bigstone, and successful sire O'Reilly. Flame of Tara was a group two winning mare in England and Ireland, as well as being the dam of Irish Derby winning filly Salsabil.

== Racing career ==
Trained by John Dunlop, Marju raced 7 times during his career and was ridden by Willie Carson each time. He won 3 races including the Craven Stakes and the St. James's Palace Stakes, as well as finishing second to Generous in the 1991 Epsom Derby. He won a total prize money of £282,640.

== Stud record ==
Retired to stud duty at Derrinstown Stud, Ireland in 1992, Marju was shuttled to New Zealand in 2000 and to Australia in 2001-02, and pensioned at Derrinstown Stud, Ireland in 2011. He sired 61 stakes winners, including Soviet Song, My Emma, Sil Sila, Satono Crown, Viva Pataca and Indigenous. He is the grandsire of Ramonti, Tastiera and Not So Sleepy. Marju died of natural causes at his owner's Derrinstown Stud in Ireland on 11 October 2016.

=== Notable progeny ===
Marju has sired 12 individual Group 1 winners, as well as being a successful broodmare sire.

c = colt, f = filly, g = gelding

Foaled	Name	Sex	Major wins
1993	Indigenous	g	Champions & Chater Cup, Hong Kong Gold Cup
1997	D'Anjou	g	Amethyst Stakes
2000	Soviet Song	f	Fillies' Mile, Ridgewood Pearl Stakes, Falmouth Stakes, Sussex Stakes, Matron Stakes, Windsor Forest Stakes
2001	Temple Hills	g	Eagle Technology Stakes
2002	Viva Pataca	g	Hong Kong Gold Cup, Champions & Chater Cup, Queen Elizabeth II Cup, International Cup Trial, Sha Tin Trophy
2002	Marju Snip	f	Australasian Oaks
2004	Fanjura	g	Easter Cup
2005	Chinchon	c	Prix Exbury
2005	Watar	c	Prix Maurice De Nieuil
2005	Raydiya	f	Lenebane Stakes
2006	Spirit of Sport	g	Premio Botticelli
2007	Bethrah	f	Irish 1000 Guineas, 1000 Guineas Trial
2007	Green Destiny	g	Strensall Stakes
2009	Lightening Pearl	f	Chevley Park Stakes
2012	Satono Crown	c	Tokyo Sports Hai Nisai Stakes, Kyoto Kinen, Hong Kong Vase, Takarazuka Kinen

== Pedigree ==
Pedigree of Marju (IRE), brown horse, 1998
Sire Last Tycoon (IRE) 1983	Try My Best (USA); 1975	Northern Dancer (CAN); 1961	Nearctic (CAN); 1954
Sire Last Tycoon (IRE) 1983	Try My Best (USA); 1975	Northern Dancer (CAN); 1961	Natalma (USA); 1957
Sire Last Tycoon (IRE) 1983	Try My Best (USA); 1975	Sex Appeal (USA); 1970	Buckpasser (USA); 1963
Sire Last Tycoon (IRE) 1983	Try My Best (USA); 1975	Sex Appeal (USA); 1970	Best in Show (USA); 1965
Sire Last Tycoon (IRE) 1983	Mill Princess (IRE); 1977	Mill Reef (USA); 1968	Never Bend (USA); 1960
Sire Last Tycoon (IRE) 1983	Mill Princess (IRE); 1977	Mill Reef (USA); 1968	Milan Mill (USA); 1962
Sire Last Tycoon (IRE) 1983	Mill Princess (IRE); 1977	Irish Lass (IRE); 1962	Sayajirao (GB); 1944
Sire Last Tycoon (IRE) 1983	Mill Princess (IRE); 1977	Irish Lass (IRE); 1962	Scollata (GB); 1952
Dam Flame of Tara (IRE) 1980	Artaius (USA); 1974	Round Table (USA); 1954	Princequillo (GB); 1940
Dam Flame of Tara (IRE) 1980	Artaius (USA); 1974	Round Table (USA); 1954	Knights Daughter (GB); 1941
Dam Flame of Tara (IRE) 1980	Artaius (USA); 1974	Stylish Pattern (USA); 1961	My Babu (FR); 1945
Dam Flame of Tara (IRE) 1980	Artaius (USA); 1974	Stylish Pattern (USA); 1961	Sunset Gun (GB); 1955
Dam Flame of Tara (IRE) 1980	Welsh Flame (GB); 1973	Welsh Pageant (FR); 1966	Tudor Melody (IRE); 1956
Dam Flame of Tara (IRE) 1980	Welsh Flame (GB); 1973	Welsh Pageant (FR); 1966	Picture Light (FR); 1954
Dam Flame of Tara (IRE) 1980	Welsh Flame (GB); 1973	Electric Flash (GB); 1962	Crepello (GB); 1954
Dam Flame of Tara (IRE) 1980	Welsh Flame (GB); 1973	Electric Flash (GB); 1962	Lightning (GB); 1950

- Marju is inbred 4 × 5 to Princequillo, meaning that this stallion appears once in the fourth generation of his pedigree and once in the fifth.
- Marju is also inbred 5 × 5 to both Nearco and Hyperion, meaning that they both appear twice in the fifth generation of his pedigree.
