= 2012 1000 Guineas =

199th 1000 Guineas Stakes
- 1000 Guineas
- Location: Newmarket Racecourse
- Date: 6 May 2012
- Winning horse: Homecoming Queen (IRE)
- Jockey: Ryan Moore
- Trainer: Aidan O'Brien (IRE)
- Owner: Susan Magnier, Michael Tabor and Derrick Smith

The 2012 1000 Guineas Stakes was a horse race held at Newmarket Racecourse on Sunday 6 May 2012. It was the 199th running of the 1000 Guineas.

The winner was Susan Magnier, Michael Tabor and Derrick Smith's Homecoming Queen, a three-year-old bay filly trained at Ballydoyle in Ireland by Aidan O'Brien and ridden by Ryan Moore. Homecoming Queen's victory was the first in the race for Moore, and the second for O'Brien after Virginia Waters (also owned by Magnier and Tabor) in 2005. Her nine length margin of victory was the widest since 1859.

== The contenders ==
The race attracted a field of seventeen runners, eleven trained in the United Kingdom, five in Ireland and one in France. The favourite was the Aidan O'Brien-trained Maybe, the European Champion Two-Year-Old Filly of 2011 whose wins included the Group One Moyglare Stud Stakes. She was accompanied by her stable companion Homecoming Queen, who had won three of her thirteen races, most notably the Leopardstown 1,000 Guineas Trial Stakes. The Godolphin stable was represented by the undefeated pair Lyric of Light (Fillies' Mile) and Discourse (Sweet Solera Stakes). The French challenger was Mashoora, the winner of the Prix Imprudence at Maisons-Laffitte on her most recent start. Other contenders included the Fred Darling Stakes winner Moonstone Magic and the Cheveley Park Stakes winner Lightening Pearl. Maybe headed the betting at odds of 13/8 ahead of Mashoora and Moonstone Magic (13/2), Lyric of Light (8/1) and Discourse (10/1). Homecoming Queen started a 25/1 outsider.

== The race ==
The start of the race was considerably delayed after Gray Pearl collapsed in the starting stalls, sustaining a fatal spinal injury. Homecoming Queen, the last filly to enter the stalls, broke very quickly and immediately took the lead from Alla Speranza, Lightening Pearl and Nayarra. After splitting into two groups across the wide, straight course, in the first quarter mile the field reunited and raced down the centre of the track. The order was maintained until three furlongs from the finish, at which point Ryan Moore increased the pace on Homecoming Queen and opened up a clear advantage. The Ballydoyle outsider never looked in any danger of defeat despite drifting to the right in the closing stages and steadily increased her lead to win by nine lengths. Another outsider, Starscope, chased her in vain throughout the final furlong and took second place by a length ahead of Maybe and The Fugue. None of the other fancied runners ever posed a threat, with Mashoora finishing twelfth, Moonstone Magic fifteenth, Discourse sixteenth and Lyric of Light seventeenth and last.

Lyric of Light, was subsequently disqualified after a post-race urine sample revealed traces of Propoxyphene, a prohibited analgesic substance.

== Race details ==
- Sponsor: QIPCO
- First prize: £213,513
- Surface: Turf
- Going: Good to Soft
- Distance: 8 furlongs
- Number of runners: 17
- Winner's time: 1:40.45

== Full result ==
Pos.	Marg.	Horse (bred)	Jockey	Trainer (Country)	Odds
1		Homecoming Queen (IRE)	Ryan Moore	Aidan O'Brien (IRE)	25/1
2	9	Starscope (GB)	Jimmy Fortune	John Gosden (GB)	33/1
3	1	Maybe (IRE)	Joseph O'Brien	Aidan O'Brien (IRE)	13/8 fav
4	¾	The Fugue (GB)	William Buick	John Gosden (GB)	22/1
5	¾	La Collina (IRE)	Declan McDonogh	Kevin Prendergast (IRE)	25/1
6	shd	Alla Speranza (GB)	Kevin Manning	Jim Bolger (IRE)	28/1
7	½	Lily's Angel (IRE)	Paul Hanagan	Richard Fahey (GB)	50/1
8	hd	Laugh Out Loud (GB)	Gerald Mosse	Mick Channon (GB)	50/1
9	nk	Nayarra (IRE)	Martin Dwyer	Mick Channon (GB)	50/1
10	2¼	Sunday Times (GB)	Jamie Spencer	Peter Chapple-Hyam (GB)	100/1
11	6	Diala (IRE)	Eddie Ahern	William Haggas (GB)	14/1
12	½	Mashoora (IRE)	Christophe Soumillon	Jean-Claude Rouger (FR)	13/2
13	3½	Lightening Pearl (IRE)	Johnny Murtagh	Ger Lyons (IRE)	20/1
14	9	Radio Gaga (GB)	Richard Mullen	Ed McMahon (GB)	100/1
15	14	Moonstone Magic (IRE)	Jim Crowley	Ralph Beckett (GB)	13/2
16	44	Discourse (USA)	Mickael Barzalona	Mahmood Al Zarooni (GB)	10/1
DSQ		Lyric of Light (GB)	Frankie Dettori	Mahmood Al Zarooni (GB)	8/1

- Abbreviations: nse = nose; nk = neck; shd = head; hd = head; dist = distance; UR = unseated rider; DSQ = disqualified

== Winner's details ==
Further details of the winner, Homecoming Queen

- Foaled: 23 April 2009
- Country: Ireland
- Sire: Holy Roman Emperor; Dam: Lagrion (Diesis)
- Owner: Susan Magnier, Michael Tabor and Derrick Smith
- Breeder: Tower Bloodstock
