= Shale (horse) =

Irish Thoroughbred racehorse

- Racing silks of Mr Derrick Smith
- Sire: Galileo
- Grandsire: Sadler's Wells
- Dam: Homecoming Queen
- Damsire: Holy Roman Emperor
- Sex: Filly
- Foaled: 26 March 2018
- Country: Ireland
- Colour: Bay
- Breeder: Coolmore Stud
- Owner: Derrick Smith, Susan Magnier & Michael Tabor
- Trainer: Donnacha O'Brien
- Record: 6: 3-1-0
- Earnings: £176,171

Major wins
- Silver Flash Stakes (2020); Moyglare Stud Stakes (2020)

Awards
- Top-rated European two-year-old filly (2020)

Shale (foaled 26 March 2018) is an Irish Thoroughbred racehorse. As a two-year-old in 2020 she made steady progress, winning a minor race on her second start and going on to take the Silver Flash Stakes and finish second in the Debutante Stakes before winning the Group 1 Moyglare Stud Stakes.

== Background ==
Shale is a bay filly with a large white star and a white sock on her left hind leg bred in Ireland by the Coolmore Stud. She raced in the colours of the Coolmore partners Derrick Smith, Susan Magnier and Michael Tabor. The filly was sent into training with Donnacha O'Brien at Goolds Cross, County Tipperary.

She was sired by Galileo, who won the Derby, Irish Derby and King George VI and Queen Elizabeth Stakes in 2001. Galileo became one of the world's leading stallions, earning his eleventh champion sire of Great Britain and Ireland title in 2019. His other progeny include Frankel, Nathaniel, New Approach, Rip Van Winkle, Found Minding, Love and Ruler of the World. Shale was the fourth foal of Homecoming Queen who won the 1000 Guineas in 2012. Homecoming Queen was a daughter of the outstanding broodmare Lagrion, making her a half-sister to Dylan Thomas, Queen's Logic and Remember When (the dam of Serpentine).

== Racing career ==
=== 2020: two-year-old season ===
Shale made her racing debut in a maiden race over seven furlongs at Leopardstown on 21 June in which she was ridden by the apprentice jockey Gavin Ryan and came home sixth of the seven runners behind Oodnadatta at odds of 10/1. Seventeen days later, with Ryan again in the saddle, she started joint-favourite for a similar event over one mile on soft to heavy ground at Gowran Park and recorded her first victory as she led for most of the way before drawing away in the final furlong to win "comfortably" by 3 1/4 lengths from High Heels. On 6 August at Leopardstown the filly was stepped up in class for the Group 3 Silver Flash Stakes and started a 14/1 outsider in a field of eight with Ryan again taking the ride despite being unable to claim his apprentice weight allowance. Shale raced in second place behind the pacemaker Finest before taking the lead a furlong out and holding off the challenge of the favourite Pretty Gorgeous (trained by Donnacha O'Brien's older brother Joseph) to win by one and a half lengths. After the race Donnacha O'Brien commented "She did it well. Obviously she improved from her maiden and her work was good. The race worked out nicely as they went a good gallop and she got a nice tow into it."

Sixteen days after her win in the Silver Flash Shale was made 7/4 favourite for the Group 2 Debutante Stakes over seven furlongs at the Curragh Racecourse but after taking the lead approaching the final furlong she was overtaken and beaten two and a half lengths into second place by Pretty Gorgeous. Ryan Moore took over from Ryan when Shale faced Pretty Gorgeous for the third time in the Group 1 Moyglare Stud Stakes at the Curragh on 13 September and started the 9/2 second favourite behind her rival. The other eleven contenders included Mother Earth (Fillies' Sprint Stakes), Oodnadatta and Teresa Mendoza (second in the Round Tower Stakes). Shale tracked the leaders in fourth place before moving up to take the lead inside the last quarter mile and repelled a sustained challenge from Pretty Gorgeous to win by three quarters of a length with a further 1 3/4 lengths back to Oodnadatta in third. Donnacha O'Brien said "It was a lovely performance. She was one of the first off the bridle and at halfway I didn't think she was going to do anything, but she found plenty for pressure. She was always a nice filly, but wasn't one we thought would be capable of winning a Moyglare at the start of the year – she's kept progressing the whole way".

On 9 October Shale was sent to England and moved up in distance for the Fillies' Mile at Newmarket Racecourse where she started 7/2 second favourite behind Pretty Gorgeous. She in mid-division but was unable to challenge the leaders and faded in the closing stages to come home sixth of the ten runners behind Pretty Gorgeous, finishing almost seven lengths behind her old rival.

In the official European classification of for 2020 Shale was given a rating of 113, making her the equal best two-year-old filly of the season alongside Pretty Gorgeous and Campanelle.

== Pedigree ==
Pedigree of Shale (IRE), bay filly, 2018
| Sire Galileo (IRE) 1998 | Sadler's Wells (USA); 1981 | Northern Dancer (CAN) | Nearctic |
| Sire Galileo (IRE) 1998 | Sadler's Wells (USA); 1981 | Northern Dancer (CAN) | Natalma (USA) |
| Sire Galileo (IRE) 1998 | Sadler's Wells (USA); 1981 | Fairy Bridge | Bold Reason |
| Sire Galileo (IRE) 1998 | Sadler's Wells (USA); 1981 | Fairy Bridge | Special |
| Sire Galileo (IRE) 1998 | Urban Sea (USA); 1989 | Miswaki | Mr Prospector |
| Sire Galileo (IRE) 1998 | Urban Sea (USA); 1989 | Miswaki | Hopespringseternal |
| Sire Galileo (IRE) 1998 | Urban Sea (USA); 1989 | Allegretta (GB) | Lombard (GER) |
| Sire Galileo (IRE) 1998 | Urban Sea (USA); 1989 | Allegretta (GB) | Anatevka (GER) |
| Dam Homecoming Queen (IRE) 2009 | Holy Roman Emperor (IRE); 2004 | Danehill (USA) | Danzig |
| Dam Homecoming Queen (IRE) 2009 | Holy Roman Emperor (IRE); 2004 | Danehill (USA) | Razyana |
| Dam Homecoming Queen (IRE) 2009 | Holy Roman Emperor (IRE); 2004 | L'On Vite (USA) | Secretariat |
| Dam Homecoming Queen (IRE) 2009 | Holy Roman Emperor (IRE); 2004 | L'On Vite (USA) | Fanfreluche (CAN) |
| Dam Homecoming Queen (IRE) 2009 | Lagrion (USA); 1989 | Diesis (GB) | Sharpen Up |
| Dam Homecoming Queen (IRE) 2009 | Lagrion (USA); 1989 | Diesis (GB) | Doubly Sure |
| Dam Homecoming Queen (IRE) 2009 | Lagrion (USA); 1989 | Wrap It Up (IRE) | Mount Hagen (FR) |
| Dam Homecoming Queen (IRE) 2009 | Lagrion (USA); 1989 | Wrap It Up (IRE) | Doc Nan (Family: 9-c) |
