= Satono Crown =

Japanese-bred Thoroughbred racehorse

Satono Crown サトノクラウン
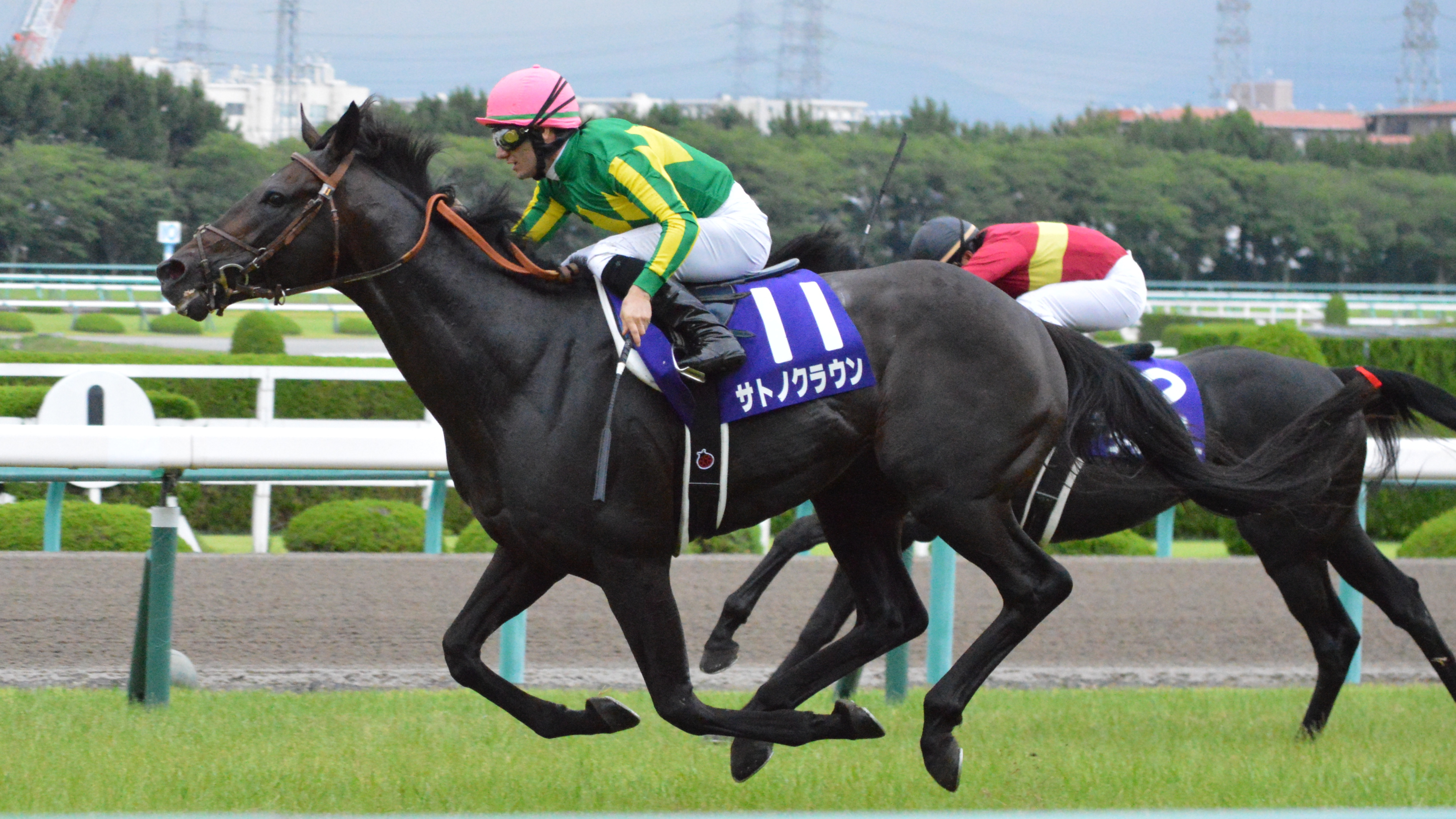
- Satono Crown at the 2017 Takarazuka Kinen.
- Breed: Thoroughbred
- Sire: Marju
- Grandsire: Last Tycoon
- Dam: Jioconda
- Damsire: Rossini
- Sex: Stallion
- Foaled: March 10, 2012 (age 14)
- Country: Japan
- Colour: Bay
- Breeder: Northern Racing
- Owner: Hajime Satomi
- Racing colours
- Trainer: Noriyuki Hori
- Jockey: Mirco Demuro
- Record: 20: 7-1-1
- Earnings: £3,852,093

Major wins
- Tokyo Sports Hai Nisai Stakes (2014); Yayoi Sho (2015); Kyoto Kinen (2016, 2017); Hong Kong Vase (2016); Takarazuka Kinen (2017)

Satono Crown (Japanese: サトノクラウン, Hepburn: Satono Kuraun; foaled 10 March 2012) is a Japanese retired Thoroughbred racehorse and breeding stallion. He showed promising form as a two-year-old in 2014, winning both of his races including the Grade 3 Tokyo Sports Hai Nisai Stakes. As a three-year-old he won the Yayoi Sho, finished sixth when favourite for the Satsuki Sho, and ran third in the Tokyo Yushun. In 2016 he won the Kyoto Kinen but then displayed indifferent form before defeating a top-class international field in the Hong Kong Vase to establish himself as one of the best horses in the world over 2,400 metres. He recorded another major victory in 2017 by taking the Takarazuka Kinen. He was retired from racing at the end of the 2018 season.

== Background ==
Satono Crown is a dark bay or brown horse bred in Japan by Northern Farm. In 2013 he was entered in the Japan Select Yearling Sale and was bought for 60,900,000 JPY by Hajime Satomi. The colt was sent into training with Noriyuki Hori.

He was sired by the Irish stallion Marju who finished second in The Derby and won the St James's Palace Stakes in 1991. Marju sired several other major winners including Soviet Song, My Emma, Viva Pataca and Indigenous.

Satono Crown's dam Jioconda showed good form as a racemare in Ireland, winning two of her eight races including the Listed Silken Glider Stakes in 2005. She was a descendant of Pato, a mare whose other foals included My Emma and Classic Cliche. Jioconda also produced Satono Crown's full sister Lightening Pearl.

== Racing career ==
=== 2014: two-year-old season ===
Satono Crown made a successful racecourse debut when he won a race for previously unraced two-year-olds over 1800 metres at Tokyo Racecourse on 25 October 2014. One month later the colt was stepped up in class for the Grade 3 Tokyo Sports Hai Nisai Stakes over the same course and distance. Ridden by Ryan Moore he started at odds of 7.1/1 and won by a neck from the favourite Avenir Marcher.

=== 2015: three-year-old season ===
On his 2015 debut Satono Crown started second favourite for the Yayoi Sho (a major trial race for the Satsuki Sho) over 2000 metres at Nakayama Racecourse on 8 March in which he was ridden by Yuichi Fukunaga. He won the race by one and a half lengths from Bright Emblem, with a gap of two and a half lengths back to Tagano Espresso in third place. His assistant trainer Atsunori Hashimoto commented "even though he wasn’t in tiptop shape he had an excellent race. I think it was utterly fantastic". The colt started favourite for the Satsuki Sho over the same course and distance on 19 April, but after starting slowly and being forced to the wide outside on the final turn he finished sixth of the fifteen runners behind Duramente (also trained by Hori), Real Steel, Kitasan Black, Bright Emblem and Clarity Sky. On 31 May he started third choice in the betting behind Duramente and Real Steel for the Tokyo Yushun over 2400 metres at Tokyo in which he was ridden as in his previous start by Christophe Lemaire. After being restrained in the early stages he stayed on well in the straight and finished third behind Duramente and Hajime Satomi's other runner Satono Rasen.

Satono Crown was given a long summer break before returning on 1 November when he was matched against older horses for the first time in the Tenno Sho over 2000 metres at Tokyo. After racing in fifth place for most of the way he weakened badly in the straight and finished seventeenth of the eighteen runners, ten lengths behind the winner Lovely Day.

In the 2015 edition of the World's Best Racehorse Rankings Satono Crown was given a rating of 115, making him the 139th best racehorse in the world and the fifteenth-best horse trained in Japan.

=== 2016: four-year-old season ===
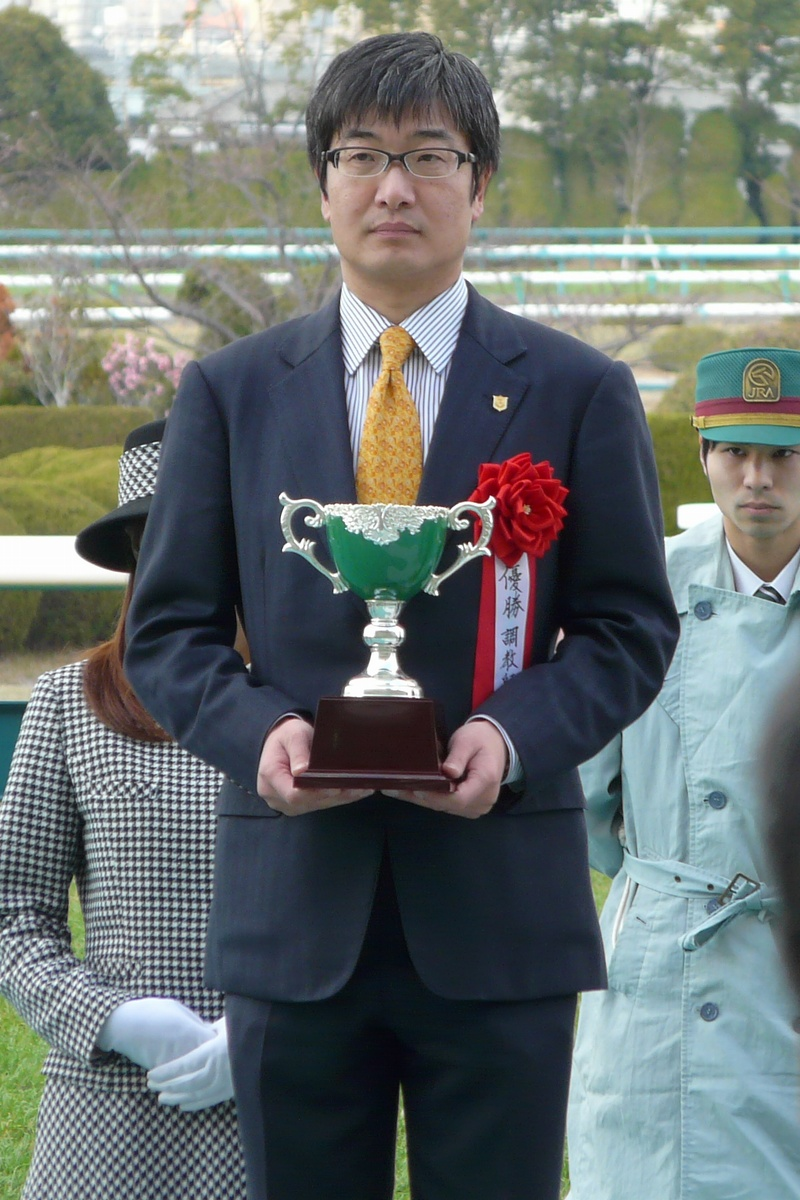
Satono Crown's trainer Noriyuki Hori

Satono Crown began his third campaign at Kyoto Racecourse on 14 February when he started at odds of 8.2/1 in a fifteen-runner field for the Grade 2 Kyoto Kinen. Ridden by Mirco Demuro he recorded his first success in eleven months as he won by three lengths and a neck from the filly Touching Speech and the five-year-old Admire Deus. He was then sent to Hong Kong to contest the Queen Elizabeth II Cup at Sha Tin Racecourse in April but made little impact and finished unplaced behind the locally trained Werther. His jockey Zac Purton commented "He jumped well and we were in a lovely spot, but when the pressure came he didn’t respond." Satono Crown was back in Japan for the Takarazuka Kinen at Hanshin Racecourse on 26 June in which he started a 28/1 outsider and finished sixth of the seventeen runners behind Marialite, Duramente, Kitasan Black, Lovely Day and Staphanos.

After a four-month break Satono Crown returned for a second attempt at the autumn edition of the Tenno Sho on 30 October. He was never in contention and finished twelfth of the thirteen runners behind Maurice. Satono Crown ended his season with a second trip to Sha Tin and started at odds of 19.5/1 for the Hong Kong Vase, a race in which he was ridden by the locally based João Moreira. The race attracted a strong international contingent headed by the Irish horse Highland Reel who was made the odds-on favourite. Other overseas contenders included Nuovo Record (Yushun Himba) and Smart Layer from Japan, Siverwave (Grand Prix de Saint-Cloud), One Foot In Heaven and Garlingari from France, Big Orange (Goodwood Cup) from England, Benzini from New Zealand an Quechua from Singapore, whilst the bet-fancied of the local runners was Helene Happy Star. After being restrained behind the leaders on the inside Satono Crown "weaved" his way through the field to move into second place behind Highland Reel approaching the final furlong. He was still three lengths behind the leader but reeled in the Irish horse in the closing stages, took the lead in the final strides and won by half a length. There was a gap of almost seven lengths back to One Foot In Heaven, who took third place ahead of Nuovo Record and Smart Layer. After the race Moreira said "I had to wait a little bit, get down to the fence, and track the French horse (Silverwave). When I got him in the open, he gave me everything". Highland Reel's trainer Aidan O'Brien offered no excuses saying "He's had a long season but he ran a great race". Commenting on Satono Crown's improvement since his previous run in Hong Kong Noriyuki Hori said "I think he has matured since the QE II Cup, but the big difference has not been physical but his mental maturity".

In the 2016 World's Best Racehorse Rankings he was rated on 123, making him the twelfth best racehorse in the world.

=== 2017: five-year-old season ===
On his first appearance of 2017 on 12 February, Satono Crown attempted to repeat his 2016 success in the Kyoto Kinen and started third choice in the betting behind the four-year-olds Makahiki and Mikki Rocket. After racing in third place he was produced with a strong run on the outside by Mirco Demuro and won by one and a quarter lengths from Smart Layer with Makahiki a neck away in third. In the Grade 1 Osaka Hai at Hanshin on 2 April he went off the 3.6/1 third choice in the betting but came home sixth of the fourteen runners behind Kitasan Black, beaten three lengths by the winner. His assistant trainer Kazutomo Mori later said "He ran a very strong race. He had lost weight for the Osaka Hai and was quiet but he was back to his usual unruly self". On 25 June on rain-softened ground at Hanshin the horse contested his second Takarazuka Kinen and started the 8/1 third choice in the betting behind Kitasan Black and Sciacchetra in an eleven-runner field which also included Mikki Queen, Cheval Grand, Gold Actor and Rainbow Line. Ridden by Demuro he raced in mid-division on the outside before making rapid progress as the field entered the straight. He took the lead 200 metres from the finish and saw off a challenge from Gold Actor on the inside to win by three quarters of a length. Demuro commented "We were able to race well while eyeing the strong Kitasan Black. He felt really good turning the fourth corner and exerted a remarkable kick in the straight. He's really a G1 horse. I think this type of ground suits him. I always had confidence in him".

After a break of over five months, Satono Crown returned to the track for the autumn edition of the Tenno Sho on 29 October. Starting the 3/1 second favourite he tracked the leaders before staying on strongly in the straight but failed to reel in the favoured Kitasan Black and finished second by a neck. He failed to reproduce his best form in two subsequent starts that year, finishing unplaced in the Japan Cup and the Arima Kinen.

In the 2017 World's Best Racehorse Rankings he was rated on 120, making him the twentieth best racehorse in the world.

=== 2018: six-year-old season ===
For his first appearance of 2018 Satono Crown was flown to the United Arab Emirates to contest the Sheema Classic over 2400 metres at Meydan Racecourse on 31 March but never looked likely to win and came home seventh of the ten runners behind Hawkbill. On his return to Japan he attempted to reproduce his success of the previous year in the Takarazuka Kinen but ran unplaced behind Mikki Rocket. Satono Crown ended his racing career in the Japan Cup at Tokyo on 25 November when he finished ninth behind Almond Eye, beaten twelve lengths by the winner.

== Stud career ==
At the end of his racing career, Satono Crown was retired to become a breeding stallion at the Shadai Stallion Station in Hokkaido.

Tastiera became the first horse sired by Satono Crown to win a graded race, the Yayoi Sho in 2023, the same race Satono Crown won 8 years earlier. After placing second in Satsuki Sho, he went on to win the Tokyo Yushun in his next start.

=== Notable progeny ===
Below data is based on JBIS Stallion Reports.

bold = grade 1 stakes

c = colt, f = filly

**Foaled**	**Name**	**Sex**	**Major Wins**
2020	Tastiera	c	Yayoi Sho, **Tokyo Yushun, Queen Elizabeth II Cup (HK)**

== In popular culture ==
An anthropomorphized version of Satono Crown appears as a character in the Japanese multimedia franchise Umamusume: Pretty Derby, voiced by Sayumi Suzushiro. She is depicted as a suave, sophisticated, and confident girl who enjoys theatrics and performing grandiose magic tricks. She is a member of the wealthy Satono family household alongside her younger sister, Satono Diamond, and shares the same dream of bringing honor to her family by becoming an accomplished racer and winning a G1 race. However, she accomplishes this feat overseas in Hong Kong, and has a notable ability to speak Cantonese, referencing her real-life counterpart's victory in the Hong Kong Vase.

== Racing form ==
Satono Crown won seven races out of 20 starts. This data available in JBIS, netkeiba and HKJC.

Date	Age	Race	Grade	Distance	Surface	Track	Entry	Finish	Time	Margin	Jockey	Winner (Runner-up)
Oct 25, 2014	2	2yo Newcomer		1800m	Turf	Tokyo	16	1st	1:50.0	–0.2	Yuichi Fukunaga	(Ontology)
Nov 24, 2014	2	Tokyo Sports Hai Nisai Stakes	3	1800m	Turf	Tokyo	16	1st	1:47.9	0.0	Ryan Moore	(Avenir Marcher)
Mar 8, 2015	3	Yayoi Sho	2	2000m	Turf	Nakayama	11	1st	2:01.8	–0.2	Yuichi Fukunaga	(Bright Emblem)
Apr 19, 2015	3	Satsuki Sho	1	2000m	Turf	Nakayama	15	6th	1:58.9	0.7	Christophe Lemaire	Duramente
May 31, 2015	3	Tokyo Yushun	1	2400m	Turf	Tokyo	18	3rd	2:23.5	0.3	Christophe Lemaire	Duramente
Nov 1, 2015	3	Tenno Sho (Autumn)	1	2000m	Turf	Tokyo	18	17th	1:59.9	1.5	Christophe Lemaire	Lovely Day
Feb 14, 2016	4	Kyoto Kinen	2	2200m	Turf	Kyoto	15	1st	2:17.7	–0.5	Mirco Demuro	(Touching Speech)
Apr 24, 2016	4	Queen Elizabeth II Cup	1	2000m	Turf	Sha Tin	13	12th	2:04.4	3.1	Zac Purton	Werther
Jun 26, 2016	4	Takarazuka Kinen	1	2200m	Turf	Hanshin	17	6th	2:13.5	0.7	Yasunari Iwata	Marialite
Oct 30, 2016	4	Tenno Sho (Autumn)	1	2000m	Turf	Tokyo	15	14th	2:00.8	1.5	Yuichi Fukunaga	Maurice
Dec 11, 2016	4	Hong Kong Vase	1	2400m	Turf	Sha Tin	14	1st	2:26.2	–0.1	Joao Moreira	(Highland Reel)
Feb 12, 2017	5	Kyoto Kinen	2	2200m	Turf	Kyoto	10	1st	2:14.1	–0.2	Mirco Demuro	(Smart Layer)
Apr 2, 2017	5	Osaka Hai	1	2000m	Turf	Hanshin	14	6th	1:59.3	0.4	Mirco Demuro	Kitasan Black
Jun 25, 2017	5	Takarazuka Kinen	1	2200m	Turf	Hanshin	11	1st	2:11.4	–0.1	Mirco Demuro	(Gold Actor)
Oct 29, 2017	5	Tenno Sho (Autumn)	1	2000m	Turf	Tokyo	18	2nd	2:08.3	0.0	Mirco Demuro	Kitasan Black
Nov 26, 2017	5	Japan Cup	1	2400m	Turf	Tokyo	17	10th	2:25.2	1.5	Mirco Demuro	Cheval Grand
Dec 24, 2017	5	Arima Kinen	1	2500m	Turf	Nakayama	16	13th	2:34.6	1.0	Ryan Moore	Kitasan Black
Mar 31, 2018	6	Dubai Sheema Classic	1	2410m	Turf	Meydan	10	7th	–	–	Joao Moreira	Hawkbill
Jun 24, 2018	6	Takarazuka Kinen	1	2200m	Turf	Hanshin	16	12th	2:12.8	1.2	Shu Ishibashi	Mikki Rocket
Nov 25, 2018	6	Japan Cup	1	2400m	Turf	Tokyo	14	9th	2:22.6	2.0	William Buick	Almond Eye

== Pedigree ==
Pedigree of Satono Crown (JPN), bay horse, 2012
Sire Marju (IRE) 1988	Last Tycoon (IRE); 1983	Try My Best	Northern Dancer
Sire Marju (IRE) 1988	Last Tycoon (IRE); 1983	Try My Best	Sex Appeal
Sire Marju (IRE) 1988	Last Tycoon (IRE); 1983	Mill Princess	Mill Reef
Sire Marju (IRE) 1988	Last Tycoon (IRE); 1983	Mill Princess	Irish Lass
Sire Marju (IRE) 1988	Flame of Tara (IRE); 1980	Artaius	Round Table
Sire Marju (IRE) 1988	Flame of Tara (IRE); 1980	Artaius	Stylish Pattern
Sire Marju (IRE) 1988	Flame of Tara (IRE); 1980	Welsh Flame	Welsh Pageant
Sire Marju (IRE) 1988	Flame of Tara (IRE); 1980	Welsh Flame	Electric Flash
Dam Jioconda (IRE) 2003	Rossini (USA); 1997	Miswaki	Mr. Prospector
Dam Jioconda (IRE) 2003	Rossini (USA); 1997	Miswaki	Hopespringseternal
Dam Jioconda (IRE) 2003	Rossini (USA); 1997	Touch of Greatness	Hero's Honor
Dam Jioconda (IRE) 2003	Rossini (USA); 1997	Touch of Greatness	Ivory Wand
Dam Jioconda (IRE) 2003	La Joconde (GB); 1999	Vettori	Machiavellian
Dam Jioconda (IRE) 2003	La Joconde (GB); 1999	Vettori	Air Distingue
Dam Jioconda (IRE) 2003	La Joconde (GB); 1999	Lust	Pursuit of Love
Dam Jioconda (IRE) 2003	La Joconde (GB); 1999	Lust	Pato (Family: 20-c)
