= 1991 Epsom Derby =

- Location: Epsom Downs Racecourse
- Date: 5 June 1991
- Winning horse: Generous
- Starting price: 9/1
- Jockey: Alan Munro
- Trainer: Paul Cole
- Owner: Fahd bin Salman bin Abdulaziz Al Saud

Epsom Derby 1991
1-2-3
Generous	Marju	Star Of Gdansk

Also Ran
4-5-6
Hector Protector	Hundra	Corrupt
7-8-9
Hokusai	Hailsham	Toulon
10-11-12
Mystiko	Environment Friend	Arokat
13
Mujaazif	13 Ran	2m 34.00s

The 1991 Epsom Derby was a horse race which took place at Epsom Downs on Wednesday 5 June 1991. It was the 212th running of the Derby, and it was won by Generous. The winner was ridden by Alan Munro and trained by Paul Cole. The pre-race joint favourites were Corrupt (sixth) and Toulon (ninth).

== Race details ==
- Sponsor: Ever Ready
- Winner's prize money: £355,000
- Going: Good to Firm
- Number of runners: 13
- Winner's time: 2m 34.00s

== Full result ==
	*	Horse	Jockey	Trainer ^{†}	SP
1		Generous	Alan Munro	Paul Cole	9/1
2	5	Marju	Willie Carson	John Dunlop	14/1
3	7	Star of Gdansk	Christy Roche	Jim Bolger (IRE)	14/1
4	½	Hector Protector	Freddy Head	François Boutin (FR)	6/1
5	shd	Hundra	Bruce Raymond	Paul Kelleway	66/1
6	½	Corrupt	Cash Asmussen	Neville Callaghan	4/1 jf
7	4	Hokusai	Lester Piggott	Henry Cecil	25/1
8	6	Hailsham	Steve Cauthen	Clive Brittain	28/1
9	½	Toulon	Pat Eddery	André Fabre (FR)	4/1 jf
10	7	Mystiko	Michael Roberts	Clive Brittain	5/1
11	10	Environment Friend	George Duffield	James Fanshawe	11/1
12	2	Arokat	Paul Eddery	Barry Hills	250/1
13	30	Mujaazif	Walter Swinburn	Michael Stoute	33/1

* The distances between the horses are shown in lengths or shorter. shd = short-head.
† Trainers are based in Great Britain unless indicated.

== Winner's details ==
Further details of the winner, Generous:

- Foaled: 8 February 1988, in Ireland
- Sire: Caerleon; Dam: Doff the Derby (Master Derby)
- Owner: Prince Fahd bin Salman
- Breeder: Barronstown Stud
- Rating in 1991 International Classifications: 137

== Form analysis ==
=== Two-year-old races ===
Notable runs by the future Derby participants as two-year-olds in 1990.

- Generous – 2nd Coventry Stakes, 3rd Vintage Stakes, 10th Prix Morny, 1st Dewhurst Stakes
- Star of Gdansk – 3rd Tyros Stakes, 2nd Futurity Stakes
- Hector Protector – 1st Prix La Flèche, 1st Prix de Cabourg, 1st Prix Morny, 1st Prix de la Salamandre, 1st Grand Critérium
- Corrupt – 4th Bernard van Cutsem Stakes, 5th Vintage Stakes
- Hokusai – 1st Bernard van Cutsem Stakes
- Hailsham – 7th Coventry Stakes, 7th Solario Stakes, 4th Royal Lodge Stakes
- Mystiko – 3rd Gimcrack Stakes
- Arokat – 2nd Champagne Stakes
- Mujaazif – 1st Royal Lodge Stakes, 4th Racing Post Trophy

=== The road to Epsom ===
Early-season appearances in 1991 and trial races prior to running in the Derby.

- Generous – 4th 2,000 Guineas
- Marju – 1st Craven Stakes, 11th 2,000 Guineas
- Star of Gdansk – 1st Tetrarch Stakes, 2nd Amethyst Stakes, 2nd Irish 2,000 Guineas
- Hector Protector – 1st Prix de Fontainebleau, 1st Poule d'Essai des Poulains
- Hundra – 1st Dee Stakes
- Corrupt – 1st Easter Stakes, 1st Lingfield Derby Trial
- Hokusai – 3rd Craven Stakes, 8th 2,000 Guineas, 4th Prix Jean Prat
- Hailsham – 4th Craven Stakes, 1st Sandown Classic Trial, 2nd Dante Stakes, 1st Derby Italiano
- Toulon – 3rd Prix Greffulhe, 1st Chester Vase
- Mystiko – 1st European Free Handicap, 1st 2,000 Guineas
- Environment Friend – 3rd Easter Stakes, 5th Craven Stakes, 1st Dante Stakes
- Arokat – 5th Feilden Stakes, 3rd Dee Stakes
- Mujaazif – 13th 2,000 Guineas

=== Subsequent Group 1 wins ===
Group 1 / Grade I victories after running in the Derby.

- Generous – Irish Derby (1991), King George VI and Queen Elizabeth Stakes (1991)
- Marju – St. James's Palace Stakes (1991)
- Hector Protector – Prix Jacques Le Marois (1991)
- Toulon – St. Leger (1991)
- Environment Friend – Eclipse Stakes (1991)

== Subsequent breeding careers ==
Leading progeny of participants in the 1991 Epsom Derby.

=== Sires of Classic winners ===
Generous (1st)

- Mystic Lips - 1st Preis der Diana (2007)
- Bahr - 2nd Epsom Oaks (1998)
- Highland Gift - Dam of Golan and Tartan Bearer
- Copeland - 1st Scottish Champion Hurdle (2004)

Marju (2nd)

- Sil Sila - 1st Prix de Diane (1996)
- Bethrah - 1st Irish 1,000 Guineas (2010)
- Soviet Song - Champion Older Horse (2004)
- Mrs Marsh - Dam of Canford Cliffs

=== Sires of Group/Grade One winners ===
Hector Protector (1st)

- Shiva - 1st Tattersalls Gold Cup (1999)
- Vanquished - 3rd The Metropolitan (2006)
- Limnos - 1st Prix Foy (1998)
- Shanty Star - 1st Queen's Vase (2003)

=== Sires of National Hunt horses ===
Toulon (9th)

- Kingscliff - 1st Betfair Chase (2005)
- Solerina - 1st Hatton's Grace Hurdle (2003, 2004, 2005)
- Too Forward - 1st River Don Novices' Hurdle (2002)
- Xenophon - 1st Coral Cup (2003)

=== Other Stallions ===
Environment Friend (11th) - Alfa Beat (1st Kerry National 2010, 2011)
Corrupt (6th) - Exported to New Zealand
Hailsham (8th) - Exported to Japan
Mystiko (10th) - Minor flat and jumps winners
Mujaazif (13th) - Exported to South Korea

== In popular culture ==
The 1991 Epsom Derby features in Whole Life Sentence (2024), a crime novel by Lynda La Plante in the Jane Tennison series. In the novel, Detective Chief Inspector Tennison is involved in policing the event, amid concerns about disruption by animal rights protesters.
