= Preseli (horse) =

Irish-bred Thoroughbred racehorse

- Sire: Caerleon
- Grandsire: Nijinsky
- Dam: Hill of Snow
- Damsire: Reference Point
- Sex: Mare
- Foaled: 10 February 1997
- Country: Ireland
- Colour: Bay
- Breeder: Abergwaun Farms
- Owner: Neil Jones
- Trainer: Michael Grassick; Michael Dickinson
- Record: 9: 4-1-0
- Earnings: £137,415

Major wins
- Debutante Stakes (1999); Moyglare Stud Stakes (1999); Derrinstown Stud 1,000 Guineas Trial (2000)

Preseli (foaled 10 February 1997) is an Irish-bred Thoroughbred racehorse and broodmare. She was one of the best two-year-olds in Ireland in 1999 when she was undefeated in three races including the Debutante Stakes and the Moyglare Stud Stakes. In the following spring she took her winning streak to four when she won the Derrinstown Stud 1,000 Guineas Trial but was beaten in her next three races that year, producing her best subsequent effort when narrowly beaten in the Pretty Polly Stakes. In 2001 she raced in North America, but failed to reproduce her European form. As a broodmare she has produced several minor winners.

== Background ==
Preseli is a bay mare bred by her owner, Neil Jones, at Pembrokeshire-based Abergwaun Farms and was named after the local Preseli Hills of west Wales. She was sent into training with Michael Grassick at the Curragh and was ridden in all of her European races by Eddie Ahern.

Her sire, Caerleon, won the Prix du Jockey Club and the Benson & Hedges Gold Cup in 1983 and went on to become an "excellent" breeding stallion, siring the winners of more than 700 races including Generous, Marienbard, Moonax and Warrsan. Preseli's was the first foal of her dam Hill of Snow who showed modest racing ability, winning one minor race from nine starts, but did better as broodmare, producing Snowfire (runner-up in the 1000 Guineas), Kong (Lingfield Derby Trial) and Mount Kilimanjaro (Further Flight Stakes). Hill of Snow was a daughter of the Kentucky Oaks winner White Star Line.

== Racing career ==
=== 1999: two-year-old season ===
Preseli made her racecourse debut in a maiden race over seven furlongs at Roscommon Racecourse on 4 July and started at odds of 7/1 in a ten-runner field. She was restrained by Ahern in the early running and was still in seventh place entering the last quarter mile but then made rapid progress, took the lead inside the final furlong and won by a length from the John Oxx-trained favourite Potentille. On 22 August the filly was moved up in class for the Listed Debutante Stakes over the same distance at Leopardstown Racecourse and started 7/1 second choice in the betting behind the Aidan O'Brien-trained Amethyst who was made the 1/4 favourite. After racing fourth of the six runners she made steady progress in the straight, caught the front-running Amethyst in the final strides, and won by three quarters of a length.

Preseli was stepped up to Group 1 class and started at odds of 9/1 for the Moyglare Stud Stakes over seven furlongs at the Curragh on 5 September. The British-trained Littlefeather started favourite after an impressive win at Chester, while the other ten runners included Amethyst, Torgau and Eurolink Raindance (second in the Sweet Solera Stakes). Torgau set the pace and opened up a clear lead approaching the final furlong as Preseli began to make rapid progress. Preseli caught Torgau in the closing stages and won by three quarters of a length with Littlefeather a length and a half away in third. After the race Eddie Ahern said "She travelled well all the way and really quickened when I asked her to go" while Michael Grassick commented "Preseli is in the Irish 1,000 guineas and the Irish Oaks next season, and I think she will stay a mile and a half because the further they went today the stronger she was finishing".

=== 2000: three-year-old season ===
On 14 May, Preseli began her second campaign in the Derrinstown Stud 1,000 Guineas Trial over one mile and, despite carrying a seven-pound weight penalty for her Group 1 win, started 7/4 favourite against eight opponents headed by the C L Weld Park Stakes winner Theoretically. After settling in second place she took the lead a furlong and a half from the finish and held off the late challenge of Storm Dream to win by a short head. At the Curragh two weeks later the filly attempted to take her unbeaten run to five when she started 5/1 second favourite for the Irish 1000 Guineas but never looked likely to win and finished unplaced behind Crimplene. Grassick later explained that the filly had been in season at the time.

Preseli was moved up in distance for the Pretty Polly Stakes (then a Group 2 race) over ten furlongs at the Curragh on 1 July in which she was matched against older fillies and mares. Starting at odds of 6/1 she finished strongly but failed by a short head to catch the Barry Hills-trained Lady Upstage, to whom she was conceding five pounds in weight. Ahern received a suspension for "excessive use of the whip" on the filly. In the Irish Oaks two weeks later Preseli raced in third place before fading badly in the straight and came home ninth of the ten runners in a race won by Petrushka.

=== 2001: four-year-old season ===
For the 2001 season, Preseli was transferred to the United States, where she was trained by the Englishman Michael Dickinson. She made little impact in her two races, finishing unplaced in the Waya Stakes at Pimlico Race Course in September and then running seventh in the Grade III Athenia Handicap at Belmont Park in the following month.

== Breeding record ==
At the end of her racing career Preseli was retired to become a broodmare for Abergwaun Farms. In November 2011 she was offered for sale at Keeneland and was bought for $50,000 by the bloodstock agent R J Bennett. Four years later she returned to the sales ring at Keeneland and was sold to Aaron Sones for $16,000. She has produced at least nine foals and six winners:

- Village Singer, a bay filly, foaled in 2004, sired by Rahy. Won one race.
- Arizona John, bay colt (later gelded), by Rahy. Won ten races.
- A Girl, bay filly, 2006, by Sadler's Wells. Won one race.
- Mountain Woman, bay filly, 2008, by Montjeu. Failed to win in 14 races.
- Echoes In The Wind, bay filly, 2009, by Montjeu. Unplaced in her only race.
- Hapiboy, bay colt (gelded), 2011, by A.P. Indy. Won one race.
- Preseli's Pulpit, bay filly, 2012, by Pulpit. Won one race.
- Tale of Preseli, bay filly, 2013, by Tale of Ekati. Won two races.
- Pretty Kitty, filly, 2016, by Tale of Ekati

== Pedigree ==
Pedigree of Preseli, bay mare, 1997
Sire Caerleon (USA) 1980	Nijinsky (CAN); 1967	Northern Dancer	Nearctic
Sire Caerleon (USA) 1980	Nijinsky (CAN); 1967	Northern Dancer	Natalma
Sire Caerleon (USA) 1980	Nijinsky (CAN); 1967	Flaming Page	Bull Page
Sire Caerleon (USA) 1980	Nijinsky (CAN); 1967	Flaming Page	Flaring Top
Sire Caerleon (USA) 1980	Foreseer (USA); 1969	Round Table	Princequillo
Sire Caerleon (USA) 1980	Foreseer (USA); 1969	Round Table	Knight's Daughter
Sire Caerleon (USA) 1980	Foreseer (USA); 1969	Regal Gleam	Hail To Reason
Sire Caerleon (USA) 1980	Foreseer (USA); 1969	Regal Gleam	Miz Carol
Dam Hill of Snow (GB) 1992	Reference Point (GB); 1984	Mill Reef	Never Bend
Dam Hill of Snow (GB) 1992	Reference Point (GB); 1984	Mill Reef	Milan Mill
Dam Hill of Snow (GB) 1992	Reference Point (GB); 1984	Home On The Range	Habitat
Dam Hill of Snow (GB) 1992	Reference Point (GB); 1984	Home On The Range	Great Guns
Dam Hill of Snow (GB) 1992	White Star Line (USA); 1975	Northern Dancer	Nearctic
Dam Hill of Snow (GB) 1992	White Star Line (USA); 1975	Northern Dancer	Natalma
Dam Hill of Snow (GB) 1992	White Star Line (USA); 1975	Fast Line	Mr Busher
Dam Hill of Snow (GB) 1992	White Star Line (USA); 1975	Fast Line	Throttle Wide (Family: 4-m)

- Preseli was inbred 3 × 3 to Northern Dancer, meaning that this stallion appears twice in the third generation of her pedigree.
