= 1997 Prix de l'Arc de Triomphe =

- Location: Longchamp Racecourse
- Date: October 5, 1997
- Winning horse: Peintre Celebre

The 1997 Prix de l'Arc de Triomphe was a horse race held at Longchamp on Sunday 5 October 1997. It was the 76th running of the Prix de l'Arc de Triomphe.

The winner was Peintre Celebre, a three-year-old colt trained in France by André Fabre. The winning jockey was Olivier Peslier.

The winning time of 2m 24.6s set a new record for the race. The previous record of 2m 26.3s was achieved by Trempolino in 1987.

== Race details ==
- Sponsor: no sponsor
- Purse: 7,000,000 F; First prize: 4,000,000 F
- Going: Good to Firm
- Distance: 2,400 metres
- Number of runners: 18
- Winner's time: 2m 24.6s (new record)

== Full result ==
Pos.	Marg.	Horse	Age	Jockey	Trainer (Country)
1		Peintre Celebre	3	Olivier Peslier	André Fabre (FR)
2	5	Pilsudski	5	Michael Kinane	Michael Stoute (GB)
3	2½	Borgia	3	Kieren Fallon	Bruno Schütz (GER)
4	shd	Oscar Schindler	5	Cash Asmussen	Kevin Prendergast (IRE)
5	shd	Predappio	4	John Reid	Saeed bin Suroor (GB)
6	snk	Helissio	4	Dominique Boeuf	Élie Lellouche (FR)
7	nk	Swain	5	Frankie Dettori	Saeed bin Suroor (GB)
8	1½	Que Belle	3	Kevin Woodburn	Harro Remmert (GER)
9	2½	Posidonas	5	Richard Quinn	Paul Cole (GB)
10	½	Busy Flight	4	Michael Hills	Barry Hills (GB)
11	2½	My Emma	4	Darryll Holland	Rae Guest (GB)
12	½	Ebadiyla	3	Johnny Murtagh	John Oxx (IRE)
13	nk	Gazelle Royale	3	Michael Roberts	John Hammond (FR)
14	5	Steward	4	Sylvain Guillot	Dominique Sépulchre (FR)
15	1½	Queen Maud	3	Thierry Jarnet	Jean de Roualle (FR)
16	2½	Le Destin	4	Thierry Gillet	Philippe Demercastel (FR)
17	½	Nothin' Leica Dane	5	Gérald Mossé	John Hammond (FR)
18	1½	Yokohama	6	Olivier Doleuze	Criquette Head (FR)

- Abbreviations: shd = short-head; snk = short-neck; nk = neck

== Winner's details ==
Further details of the winner, Peintre Celebre.

- Sex: Colt
- Foaled: 17 March 1994
- Country: United States
- Sire: Nureyev; Dam: Peinture Bleue (Alydar)
- Owner: Daniel Wildenstein
- Breeder: Allez France Stables
