= Ezzoud =

Irish-bred Thoroughbred racehorse

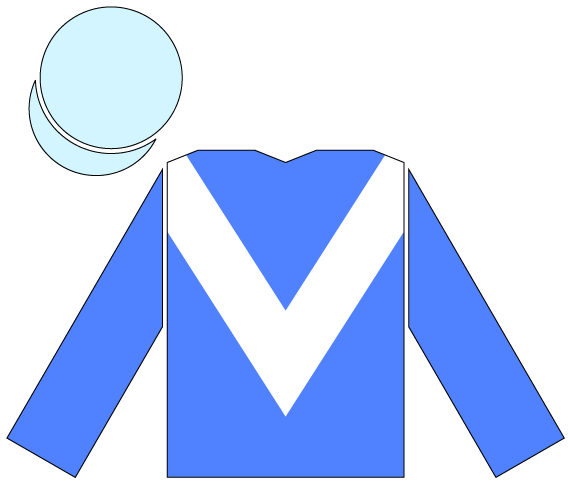
- Racing colours of Maktoum Al Maktoum
- Sire: Last Tycoon
- Grandsire: Try My Best
- Dam: Royal Sister
- Damsire: Claude
- Sex: Stallion
- Foaled: 6 May 1989
- Country: Ireland
- Colour: Bay
- Breeder: T J Monaghan
- Owner: Sheikh Maktoum Al Maktoum
- Trainer: Michael Stoute
- Record: 22: 6-5-2
- Earnings: $753,866

Major wins
- Earl of Sefton Stakes (1993); International Stakes (1993, 1994); Eclipse Stakes (1994)
- Last updated on October 12, 2006

Ezzoud (6 May 1989 – August 1998), was a Thoroughbred racehorse bred in Ireland and trained in the United Kingdom during a racing career which lasted from 1991 to 1994. He is best known for winning consecutive runnings of the International Stakes at York.

== Background ==
Ezzoud was bred in Ireland by T. J. Monaghan. Sired by the Nunthorpe Stakes and Breeders' Cup Mile winner Last Tycoon, he was out of the mare Royal Sister, making him a half-brother to the Sussex Stakes winner Distant Relative. His pedigree made him a valuable prospect and he fetched 360,000 guineas when put through the sales ring as a yearling. Bought by Sheikh Maktoum Al Maktoum, he was put into training with Michael Stoute at Newmarket.

He came to be regarded as a highly talented but unpredictable performer, who usually raced in a visor. His lack of consistency sometimes made him unpopular – according to Richard Edmondson, writing in the Independent, he was "called more names than the fat boy in the school playground" – and he was a notably lazy worker at home.

Ezzoud (ازود) is an Arabic term which can be translated as "provider" or "I provide".

== Racing career ==
=== 1991: two-year-old season ===
Ezzoud's two-year-old career was brief, beginning with a short-head win in a Doncaster graduation stakes (a race open to horses who have won no more than once previously). On his next start, he ran in the highly competitive Tiffany Highflyer Stakes. The field of 30 two-year-olds included the future Derby winner Dr. Devious, and the inexperienced Ezzoud finished well down the field after racing prominently for much of the way.

=== 1992: three-year-old season ===
At three, he began with a short-head defeat to Lucky Lindy in the Listed Easter Stakes, then won a minor stakes event at Sandown Park, beating the future July Cup winner Hamas. From this point on, he was campaigned at the highest level, beginning with a length defeat by Rodrigo de Triano in the Irish 2,000 Guineas. At Royal Ascot he produced another placed effort, finishing third to Brief Truce in the St James's Palace Stakes, ahead of Rodrigo de Triano and Arazi. After running unplaced behind St Jovite when attempting the mile-and-a-half distance in the Irish Derby his season was cut short by injury.

=== 1993: four-year-old season ===
At four Ezzoud had some successes, but began to acquire a reputation for unpredictability. His nervous demeanour and high, awkward head carriage led many observers to question his temperament. He began by recording his first Group win in the Earl of Sefton Stakes at Newmarket, beating Cloud of Dust by one and a half lengths. He was then sent to Ireland, where he was made favourite for the Tattersalls Gold Cup (then a Group 2 Race), but after taking the lead a furlong from the finish, he was caught in the last strides and beaten a short head by George Augustus. He was made favourite again in his next race, and again he disappointed his supporters, finishing unplaced in the Prince of Wales's Stakes at Royal Ascot.

In the International Stakes, he was ignored by the betting public and started the race as a 28-1 outsider whilst the inexperienced three-year-old Sabrehill was made favourite. He produced an upset, however, making a strong run in the straight he "swept past" Sabrehill inside the last furlong to win the Group 1 prize by one and a half lengths. After the race his trainer, Michael Stoute, explained his view that the horse had been misunderstood: "People think these horses with high head carriages are absolute crabs but that's not always the case. He's more lazy than anything else and he's answered the questions today".

Ezzoud's unpredictable form continued into the autumn. He made no impression in the Prix de l'Arc de Triomphe but then proved the best of the British horses in the Champion Stakes. He challenged for the lead a furlong from the finish, before finishing a good second to the French-trained filly Hatoof. As the first two were both owned by Maktoum al Maktoum, whose family sponsored the race, the prize money was donated to charity. Ezzoud ended the season by running unplaced in the Breeders' Cup Classic, behind the 133-1 winner Arcangues.

=== 1994: five-year-old season ===
At five, he began slowly, but improved throughout the first half of the season. He was unlucky in the Prix Ganay, finishing sixth after being bumped by one of his opponents in the Longchamp straight. He then finished third in his second attempt at the Tattersalls Gold Cup before a narrow defeat to Muhtarram in the Prince of Wales's Stakes.

Ezzoud's appearance was not impressive before the Eclipse Stakes at Sandown as he sweated profusely in the paddock, but he went on to record his second Group I victory. He raced in the middle of the field before making his challenge and defeated the St Leger winner Bob's Return by a length and a half, despite hanging right in the closing stages, with the Derby winner Erhaab in third. Michael Stoute praised his colt, whilst acknowledging his "cranky" nature: "he is sometimes a bit of a lad at home. But you can't fault him on the racecourse".

Ezzoud played a significant, but unexpected role in the King George VI and Queen Elizabeth Stakes three weeks later. He swerved leaving the starting-stalls, unseating his jockey Walter Swinburn, and then galloped alongside the leaders for the rest of the race, causing interference to several of his rivals, the effect being compared to "a bowling ball scattering tenpins".

He returned to his best, however, for his second attempt at the International Stakes. In this race, Ezzoud disproved those who had labelled him ungenuine, getting the better of Muhtarram by a neck, with the rest of a top quality field including King's Theatre and Grand Lodge finishing well-beaten. His rider, Walter Swinburn, celebrated with uncharacteristic emotion by throwing his whip into the crowd. In his second attempt at the Arc he produced his best performance over the mile-and-a-half distance, challenging strongly in the straight and taking fourth place in a driving finish, less than a length behind the winner Carnegie. After a final unplaced effort in the Breeders' Cup Classic he was retired to stud.

== Assessment ==
Timeform rated Ezzoud at 87p as a two-year-old, 120 as a three-year-old and 123 as a four-year-old, before awarding him a peak rating of 126 as a five-year-old in 1994.

== Stud career ==
Ezzoud stood as a stallion at the Royal Studs at Sandringham. He died after only four seasons, having suffered a series of complications following an operation for laminitis. His best offspring was the Lancashire Oaks winner, Ela Athena. His daughter Miracle produced the Champion Hurdle winner Katchit.

== Pedigree ==
Pedigree of Ezzoud (IRE), bay stallion, 1989
Sire Last Tycoon (IRE) 1983	Try My Best; 1975	Northern Dancer	Nearctic
Sire Last Tycoon (IRE) 1983	Try My Best; 1975	Northern Dancer	Natalma
Sire Last Tycoon (IRE) 1983	Try My Best; 1975	Sex Appeal	Buckpasser
Sire Last Tycoon (IRE) 1983	Try My Best; 1975	Sex Appeal	Best In Show
Sire Last Tycoon (IRE) 1983	Mill Princess; 1977	Mill Reef	Never Bend
Sire Last Tycoon (IRE) 1983	Mill Princess; 1977	Mill Reef	Milan Mill
Sire Last Tycoon (IRE) 1983	Mill Princess; 1977	Irish Lass	Sayajirao
Sire Last Tycoon (IRE) 1983	Mill Princess; 1977	Irish Lass	Scollata
Dam Royal Sister (IRE) 1977	Claude; 1964	Hornbeam	Hyperion
Dam Royal Sister (IRE) 1977	Claude; 1964	Hornbeam	Thicket
Dam Royal Sister (IRE) 1977	Claude; 1964	Aigue-Vive	Vatellor
Dam Royal Sister (IRE) 1977	Claude; 1964	Aigue-Vive	Vice-Versa
Dam Royal Sister (IRE) 1977	Ribasha; 1967	Ribot	Tenerani
Dam Royal Sister (IRE) 1977	Ribasha; 1967	Ribot	Romanella
Dam Royal Sister (IRE) 1977	Ribasha; 1967	Natasha	Nasrullah
Dam Royal Sister (IRE) 1977	Ribasha; 1967	Natasha	Vagrancy (Family: 13-c)
