= Cornelscourt Stakes =

Flat horse race in Ireland

- Class: Group 3
- Location: Leopardstown; County Dublin, Ireland
- Race type: Flat / Thoroughbred
- Website: Leopardstown

Race information
- Distance: 7 furlongs (1,408 metres)
- Surface: Turf
- Track: Left-handed
- Qualification: Three-years-old and up fillies and mares
- Weight: 9 st 2 lb Penalties; 3 lb for G1 / G2 winners
- Purse: €50,000 (2021); 1st: €29,500

Leopardstown 1,000 Guineas Trial
2026
City Of Memphis	Signora	Snellen

Previous years
2025
Vera's Secret	Fiery Lucy	Bella Isabella
2024
Wendla	Buttons	Vina Arana
2023
Zarinsk	Tarawa	Aspen Grove
2022
History	Agartha	Honey Girl
2021
Joan Of Arc	Flirting Bridge	Thinking Of You

2020-2011
2020
Know It All	Celestial Object	Ridenza
2019
Hamariyna	Dean Street Doll	Trethias
2018
Who's Steph	Ship Of Dreams	Alghabrah
2017
Bean Feasa	Asking	Shes Ranger
2016
Now Or Never	Radiantly	Emergent
2015
Kissed By Angels	Devonshire	Stormfly
2014
Afternoon Sunlight	Palace	Ballybacka Queen
2013
Just Pretending	Hint of A Tint	Mizzava
2012
Yellow Rosebud	Devotion	Coral Wave
2011
Ballybacka Lady	Sapphire Pendant	Dance Secretary

2010-2001
2010
Bethrah	Atasari	Hen Night
2009
Baliyana	Aaroness	Firey Red
2008
Carribean Sunset	Katiyra	Indiana Gal
2007
Alexander Tango	Nell Gwyn	Divine Night
2006
Queen Cleopatra	Modeeroch	Tamazug
2005
Belle Artiste	Sky High Flyer	Adaala
2004
Alexander Goldrun	Misty Heights	Miss Childrey
2003
Cat Belling	Flamelet	Hymn Of Love
2002
Marionnaud	Aqualina	Moon Safari
2001
Speirbhean	Najah	Saying Grace

2000-1991
2000
Preseli	Storm Dream	Theoretically
1999
Carambola	Apparatchik	Polaire
1998
Kitza	Brief Sentiment	Idle Rich
1997
Strawberry Roan	Welsh Queen	Magical Cliche
1996
Tossup	Asmara	Tirol Hope
1995
Mediation	Wild Bluebell	Park Charger
1994
Zavaleta	Low Key Affair	Common Rumpus
1993
Danse Royale	Eurostorm	Adolescence
1992
Khanata	Gdansk's Honour	French Flair
1991
Rua D'Oro	Pennine Music	Isle Of Glass

1990-1988
1990
The Caretaker	Free Thinker	Freezing Line
1989
Blasted Heath	Elegance In Design	Petite Ile
1988
Charmante	Impressive Lady	Triple Kiss

The Cornelscourt Stakes is a Group 3 flat horse race in Ireland open to thoroughbred fillies ages three years and olders. It is run over a distance of 7 furlongs (1,408 metres) at Leopardstown in May.

== History ==
The event was originally known as the Wassl Race and run over 1 mile. It was named after Wassl, the winner of the Irish 2,000 Guineas in 1983. For a period it held Listed status.

The name was changed to the Derrinstown Stud 1,000 Guineas Trial in 1990 when Derrinstown Stud began sponsoring the race. It was promoted to Group 3 level in 2002. In 2021 it was run without sponsorship as the Irish 1,000 Guineas Trial and it took on its present name in 2022. The race served as a trial for the Irish 1,000 Guineas. The last horse to win both races was Bethrah in 2010.

The race conditions changed in 2025 when the distance was reduced to 7 furlongs and the race was opened to older fillies.

== Records ==
Leading jockey since 1986 (5 wins):

- Kevin Manning – Zavaleta (1994), Speirbhean (2001), Marionnaud (2002), Alexander Goldrun (2004), Bean Feasa (2017)

Leading trainer since 1986 (9 wins):

- Aidan O'Brien – Strawberry Roan (1997), Kitza (1998), Carambola (1999), Belle Artiste (2005), Queen Cleopatra (2006), Just Pretending (2013), Kissed By Angels (2015), Joan of Arc (2021), History (2022)

== Winners since 1986 ==
Year	Winner	Jockey	Trainer	Time
1986	Lake Champlain	Michael Kinane	Dermot Weld
1987	Just Class	John Lowe	Steve Norton
1988	Charmante	Christy Roche	David O'Brien	1:44.40
1989	Blasted Heath	David Parnell	Michael Kauntze	1:41.70
1990	The Caretaker	Michael Kinane	Dermot Weld	1:41.20
1991	Rua d'Oro	Lester Piggott	Vincent O'Brien	1:41.30
1992	Khanata	Johnny Murtagh	John Oxx	1:46.00
1993	Eurostorm (Note: Danse Royale finished first in 1993, but she was relegated to second place following a stewards' inquiry)	Pat Gilson	Con Collins	1:42.00
1994	Zavaleta	Kevin Manning	Jim Bolger	1:41.50
1995	Mediation	Johnny Murtagh	John Oxx	1:44.90
1996	Tossup	Pat Shanahan	James Burns	1:40.80
1997	Strawberry Roan	Christy Roche	Aidan O'Brien	1:46.40
1998	Kitza	Christy Roche	Aidan O'Brien	1:41.70
1999	Carambola	Michael Kinane	Aidan O'Brien	1:43.40
2000	Preseli	Eddie Ahern	Michael Grassick	1:41.60
2001	Speirbhean	Kevin Manning	Jim Bolger	1:40.30
2002	Marionnaud	Kevin Manning	Jim Bolger	1:40.20
2003	Cat Belling	Pat Shanahan	Kevin Prendergast	1:43.00
2004	Alexander Goldrun (Note: The 2004 and 2005 races were run over 7 furlongs (1,408 metres))	Kevin Manning	Jim Bolger	1:31.40
2005	Belle Artiste	Kieren Fallon	Aidan O'Brien	1:36.70
2006	Queen Cleopatra	Seamie Heffernan	Aidan O'Brien	1:44.50
2007	Alexander Tango	Wayne Lordan	Tommy Stack	1:39.30
2008	Carribean Sunset	Pat Smullen	Dermot Weld	1:40.48
2009	Baliyana	Michael Kinane	John Oxx	1:39.96
2010	Bethrah	Pat Smullen	Dermot Weld	1:38.20
2011	Ballybacka Lady	Fran Berry	Pat Fahy	1:39.76
2012	Yellow Rosebud	Pat Smullen	Dermot Weld	1:42.94
2013	Just Pretending	Joseph O'Brien	Aidan O'Brien	1:41.46
2014	Afternoon Sunlight	Pat Smullen	Dermot Weld	1:43.84
2015	Kissed By Angels	Seamie Heffernan	Aidan O'Brien	1:50.73
2016	Now Or Never	Kieren Fallon	Michael O'Callaghan	1:42.09
2017	Bean Feasa	Kevin Manning	Jim Bolger	1:42.06
2018	Who's Steph	Colin Keane	Ger Lyons	1:41.64
2019	Hamariyna	Ronan Whelan	Michael Halford	1:42.99
2020	Know It All (Note: The 2020 race was run in July as the Derrinstown Stud Fillies Stakes due to the COVID-19 pandemic in the Republic of Ireland)	Ben Coen	Johnny Murtagh	1:42.41
2021	Joan of Arc	Ryan Moore	Aidan O'Brien	1:42.64
2022	History	Ryan Moore	Aidan O'Brien	1:41.74
2023	Zarinsk	Colin Keane	Ger Lyons	1:46.22
2024	Wendla	Colin Keane	Ger Lyons	1:45.12
2025	Vera's Secret	Seamie Heffernan	John Feane	1:31.21
2026	City Of Memphis	Billy Lee	Paddy Twomey	1:28:58

== See also ==
- Horse racing in Ireland
- List of Irish flat horse races
