= Kilbegnet Novice Chase =

Steeplechase horse race in Ireland

Kilbegnet E.B.F. Novice Chase
2026
A Snow White Park	Femme Magnifique	Miss Fourie

Previous years
2025
Westport Cove	Special Cadeau	King Of Kingsfield
2024
San Salvador	A Law Of Her Own	Thecompanysergeant
2023
Hercule Du Seuil	Calico	The Banger Doyle
2022
Enniskerry	Midnight Run	Sole Pretender
2021
Exit Poll	Embittered	Bold Enough

2020-2011
2020
Benruben	Razoul	Andalusa
2019
Djingle	Due Reward	Cliff House
2018
Ornua	Cadmium	Classic Theatre
2017
Landofhopeandglory	Rock On Fruity	Inis Meain
2016
Ridestan	Neverushacon	Baily Cloud
2015
The Game Changer	Sizing Platinum	King of The Picts
2014
Ted Veale	Un Beau Roman	The Black Russian
2013
Darwins Fox	Cootamundra	Ballyfinboy
2012
Baily Green	House Rules	Imperial Shabra
2011
St Devote	Nakajima Nate	De Valira

2010-2001
2010
Save My Blushes	Echo Bob	Beau Michael
2009
Emmpat	Fisher Bridge	Saddler's Native
2008
Kalderon	Holly Tree	Changing Course
2007
Conna Castle	Corrieann	Jubilant Note
2006
Ballyagran	Some Timbering	Rose N Alice
2005
Master Of the Chase	Kahuna	Cash And Carry
2004
Always	Old Flame	Doodle Addle
2003
Splendour	Golden Row	Say Again
2002
Fiery Ring	Ansar	Snob Wells
2001
Masalarian	Dark Magic	Why Bother

2000-1998
2000
Bushman's River	Mohera King	Sunshine Cabs
1998
Nuzum Road Makers	Cockney Lad	Spirit Dancer

The Kilbegnet Novice Chase is a Grade 3 National Hunt novice steeplechase in Ireland which is open to horses aged four years or older. It is run at Roscommon over a distance of about 2 miles and half a furlong (2 miles and 72 yards, or 3,284 metres), and it is scheduled to take place each year in late September or early October.

The race was awarded Grade 3 status in 2007.

== Records ==
Leading jockey (4 wins):

- Paul Carberry – Always (2004), Ballyagran (2006), Kalderon (2008), Save My Blushes (2010)

Leading trainer (4 wins):

- Henry de Bromhead - Darwins Fox (2013), Ridestan (2016), Ornua (2018), Benruben (2020)

== Winners since 1998 ==
Year	Winner	Age	Jockey	Trainer
1998	Nuzum Road Makers		Norman Williamson	Michael Cunningham
1999	no race 1999
2000	Bushman's River (Note: The 2000 running took place at Punchestown)	5	Ruby Walsh	Ted Walsh
2001	Masalarian	6	Conor O'Dwyer	Arthur Moore
2002	Fiery Ring (Note: The 2002 running took place at Limerick)	7	Ross Geraghty	John Fowler
2003	Splendour	8	Barry Geraghty	Suzanne Cox
2004	Always	5	Paul Carberry	Noel Meade
2005	Master Of the Chase	7	David Casey	Charlie Swan
2006	Ballyagran	6	Paul Carberry	Noel Meade
2007	Conna Castle	8	Davy Russell	James Joseph Mangan
2008	Kalderon	8	Paul Carberry	Tom Hogan
2009	Emmpat	11	David Casey	Charlie Swan
2010	Save My Blushes	4	Paul Carberry	Paul W Flynn
2011	St Devote	6	Barry Geraghty	Eoin Griffin
2012	Baily Green	6	David Casey	Mouse Morris
2013	Darwins Fox	7	Andrew Lynch	Henry de Bromhead
2014	Ted Veale	7	Barry Geraghty	Tony Martin
2015	The Game Changer	6	Bryan Cooper	Gordon Elliott
2016	Ridestan (Note: The 2016 running took place at Gowran Park)	6	David Mullins	Henry de Bromhead
2017	Landofhopeandglory	4	Mark Walsh	Joseph O'Brien
2018	Ornua	7	Dylan Robinson	Henry de Bromhead
2019	Djingle	6	Adrian Heskin	John Queally
2020	Benruben	7	Rachael Blackmore	Henry de Bromhead
2021	Exit Poll	7	Sean O'Keeffe	Jessica Harrington
2022	Enniskerry	8	Michael O'Sullivan	Barry Connell
2023	Hercule Du Seuil	6	Mark Walsh	Willie Mullins
2024	San Salvador	8	JJ Slevin	Joseph O'Brien
2025	Westport Cove	7	Paul Townend	Willie Mullins
2026	A Snow White Park	5	Danny Mullins	Margaret Mullins

== See also ==
- Horse racing in Ireland
- List of Irish National Hunt races
