= Lenebane Stakes =

Flat horse race in Ireland

- Class: Listed
- Location: Roscommon Racecourse - Roscommon, County Roscommon, Ireland
- Inaugurated: 2006
- Race type: Flat / Thoroughbred
- Website: Roscommon

Race information
- Distance: 1m 3f 149y (2,349 metres)
- Surface: Turf
- Track: Right-handed
- Qualification: Three-year-olds and up excluding G1 / G2 winners
- Weight: 8 st 12 lbs (3yo); 9 st 11 lbs (4yo+); Allowances; 5 lbs for fillies and mares Penalties; 3 lbs for G3/Listed winners * * since July 1 last year
- Purse: €35,250 (2022); 1st: €22,125

Lenebane Stakes
2026
| Bosphorus Rose | Abbey Actress | Starford |

Previous years
2025
Chally Chute | Cheeky Wink | Romzina
2024
La Isla Mujeres | Cristal Clere | Serious Challenge
2023
Espionage | Young Ireland | Jackfinbar
2022
Beamish | Yaxeni | Jason The Militant
2021
Layfayette | Hector De Maris | Haparanda

2020-2011
2020
Pondus | Camphor | Helvic Dream
2019
Downdraft | Massif Central | Masaff
2018
Kalaxana | Maths Prize | Family Tree
2017
Flying Fairies | Glamorous Approach | Savannah Storm
2016
Red Stars | Chemical Charge | Simannka
2015
Panama Hat | Altesse | Toe The Line
2014
Einsteins Folly | Belisarius | Ebeyina
2013
Bunairgead | El Salvador | Majenta
2012
Aklan | Massiyn | Eternal Bounty
2011
Quest For Peace | Haziyna | Banksters Bonus

2010-2006
2010
Karasiyra | Sense Of Purpose | Leo Gali
2009
Alaivan | Von Jawlensky | Via Galilei
2008
Raydiya | Arkadina | Honoria
2007
Princess Nala | Blackberry Boy | Arch Rebel
2006
Royal Intrigue | Blessyourpinksox | Kalderon

The Lenebane Stakes is a Listed flat horse race in Ireland open to thoroughbreds three-year-olds and older. It is run at Roscommon over a distance of 1 mile 3 furlongs and 175 yards (2,373 metres), and it is scheduled to take place each year on Ladies Day, the first day of Roscommon's July meeting. It is Roscommon's most prestigious flat race.

== History ==
The name Lenebane is derived from the townland in which Roscommon Racecourse is situated. The race was first run in 2006 and was given Listed status. It was originally contested over 10 furlongs, being lengthened to 12 furlongs the subsequent year. It has been run over this distance ever since.

== Records ==
Leading jockey (3 wins):

- Chris Hayes – Panama Hat (2015), Kalaxana (2018), Layfayette (2021)

Leading trainer (6 wins):

- John Oxx – Raydiya (2008), Alaivan (2009), Karasiyra (2010), Aklan (2012), Red Stars (2016), Flying Faries (2017)

== Winners ==
| Year | Winner | Age | Jockey | Trainer | Time |
|---|---|---|---|---|---|
| 2006 | Royal Intrigue | 3 | Pat Smullen | Dermot Weld | 2:14.30 |
| 2007 | Princess Nala | 5 | Rory Cleary | Mick Halford | 3:01.60 |
| 2008 | Raydiya | 3 | Niall McCullagh | John Oxx | 2:49.90 |
| 2009 | Alaivan | 3 | Michael Kinane | John Oxx | 2:49.62 |
| 2010 | Karasiyra | 3 | Niall McCullagh | John Oxx | 2:36.37 |
| 2011 | Quest For Peace | 3 | Colm O'Donoghue | Aidan O'Brien | 2:32.93 |
| 2012 | Aklan | 3 | Ben Curtis | John Oxx | 2:40.34 |
| 2013 | Bunairgead | 3 | Rory Cleary | Jim Bolger | 2:31.75 |
| 2014 | Einsteins Folly | 4 | Kevin Manning | Jim Bolger | 2:32.00 |
| 2015 | Panama Hat | 4 | Chris Hayes | Andrew Oliver | 2:33.73 |
| 2016 | Red Stars | 3 | Declan McDonogh | John Oxx | 2:45.26 |
| 2017 | Flying Faries | 4 | Gary Carroll | John Oxx | 2:33.73 |
| 2018 | Kalaxana | 3 | Chris Hayes | Michael Halford | 2:34.44 |
| 2019 | Downdraft | 4 | Donnacha O'Brien | Joseph O'Brien | 2:39.60 |
| 2020 | Pondus | 4 | Wayne Lordan | Joseph O'Brien | 2:57.68 |
| 2021 | Layfayette | 4 | Chris Hayes | Noel Meade | 2:41.33 |
| 2022 | Beamish | 4 | Declan McDonogh | Paddy Twomey | 2:44.22 |
| 2023 | Espionage | 3 | Ryan Moore | Aidan O'Brien | 2:39.07 |
| 2024 | La Isla Mujeres | 4 | Billy Lee | Paddy Twomey | 2:33.97 |
| 2025 | Chally Chute | 7 | Donagh O'Connor | Ross O'Sullivan | 2:40.16 |
| 2026 | Bosphorus Rose | 4 | Billy Lee | Paddy Twomey | 2:39.81 |

== See also ==
- Horse racing in Ireland
- List of Irish flat horse races
