= Round Tower Stakes =

Flat horse race in Ireland

- Class: Group 3
- Location: Curragh Racecourse; County Kildare, Ireland
- Race type: Flat / Thoroughbred
- Sponsor: Heider Family
- Website: Curragh

Race information
- Distance: 6f (1,207 metres)
- Surface: Turf
- Track: Straight
- Qualification: Two-year-olds
- Weight: 9 st 5 lb Allowances; 3 lb for fillies Penalties; 7 lb for Group 1 winners 5 lb for Group 2 winners 5 lb if two Group 3 wins 3 lb if one Group 3 win
- Purse: €55,000 (2022); 1st: €32,450

Round Tower Stakes
2026
Push The Boat Out	Great Barrier Reef	Velozee

Previous years
2025
Mission Central	The Publican's Son	Learntodiscover
2024
Ides Of March	Usdi Atohi	Rudi's Apple
2023
Letsbefrankaboutit	Mansa Musa	Chandigah
2022
Treasure Trove	Ocean Quest	Coralillo
2021
Sacred Bridge	Geocentric	Ladies Church

2020-2011
2020
New Treasure	Teresa Mendoza	Coulthard
2019
Lope Y Fernandez	Guildsman	Fort Myers
2018
Ten Sovereigns	Bruce Wayne	Fantasy
2017
U S Navy Flag	Landshark	Ball Girl
2016
Intelligence Cross	Holy Cat	De Boss Man
2015
Smash Williams	Rockaway Valley	Al Qahwa
2014
Cappella Sansevero	Rapid Applause	War Envoy
2013
Great White Eagle	Remember You	Expedition
2012
Leitir Mor	Cougar Ridge	Royal Empress
2011
Lightening Pearl	Experience	An Ghalanta

2010-2001
2010
Dingle View	Glor Na Mara	Big Issue
2009
Arctic	Air Chief Marshal	Sebastian Flyte
2008
Maoineach	Silver Shoon	Cristal Island
2007
Norman Invader	Perfect Polly	Great Barrier Reef
2006
Rabatash	Chivalrous	Dushinka
2005
Abigail Pett	Aussie Rules	Golden Arrow
2004
Cherokee	Lock And Key	Indesatchel
2003
Wathab	Simple Exchange	Troubadour
2002
Walayef	Mombassa	Daganya
2001
Steaming Home	Minashki	Stonemason

2000-1991
2000
Lady Of Kildare	Modigliani	Rose Gypsy
1999
Warrior Queen	Poco A Poco	Somerset
1998
Show Me The Money	Antinnaz	Super Goldluck
1997
Law Library	Kitza	Marigot Bay
1996
Desert Ease	Classic Park	Check The Band
1995
Thrilling Day	High Target	Nashcash
1994
Viaticum	Jahid	Ridgewood Pearl
1993
Morcote	Diligent Dodger	Miss Kristin
1992
Up And At 'Em	Staviski	Wangola
1991
Safety Tactic	Night Duty	Albenita

1990-1988
1990
Bufalino	Inishdalla	Heatintheplace
1989
Wedding Bouquet	Tanwi	Sir Arthur Hobbs
1988
Comfort And Style	Lem's Peace	So Tenderly

The Round Tower Stakes is a Group 3 flat horse race in Ireland open to two-year-old thoroughbreds. It is run at the Curragh over a distance of 6 furlongs (1,207 metres), and it is scheduled to take place each year in late August or early September.

The event was formerly contested over 5 furlongs, and it used to be classed at Listed level. It was extended to 6 furlongs in 1991, and promoted to Group 3 status in 2004.

The Round Tower Stakes was sponsored by Moyglare Stud from 1993 to 2013 and its full title included the name of Go and Go, a successful Moyglare racehorse. The 2014 running was sponsored by Nestlé, supporting the Irish Autism Action charity.

== Records ==
Leading jockey since 1988 (6 wins):

- Kevin Manning - Law Library (1997), Abigail Pett (2005), Maoineach (2008), Leitir Mor (2012), Smash Williams (2015), New Treasure (2020)

Leading trainer since 1988 (9 wins):

- Aidan O'Brien - Warrior Queen (1999), Cherokee (2004), Great White Eagle (2013), Intelligence Cross (2016), U S Navy Flag (2017), Ten Sovereigns (2018), Lope Y Fernandez (2019), Ides Of March (2024), Mission Central (2025)

== Winners since 1988 ==
Year	Winner	Jockey	Trainer	Time
1988	Comfort and Style	Michael Kinane	Dermot Weld	1:04.00
1989	Wedding Bouquet	John Reid	Vincent O'Brien	1:01.00
1990	Bufalino	Christy Roche	Jim Bolger	1:00.30
1991	Safety Tactic	Michael Kinane	Dermot Weld	1:12.20
1992	Up and at 'Em	Benjy Coogan	Jimmy Coogan	1:18.40
1993	Morcote	Michael Kinane	John Oxx	1:16.00
1994	Viaticum	Stephen Craine	Noel Meade	1:16.70
1995	Thrilling Day	Darryll Holland	Neil Graham	1:13.50
1996	Desert Ease	Michael Kinane	Dermot Weld	1:13.70
1997	Law Library	Kevin Manning	Jim Bolger	1:15.20
1998	Show Me the Money	Johnny Murtagh	Noel Meade	1:17.60
1999	Warrior Queen	Michael Kinane	Aidan O'Brien	1:12.60
2000	Lady of Kildare	Pat Smullen	Tom Taaffe	1:13.70
2001	Steaming Home	Pat Smullen	Dermot Weld	1:13.30
2002	Walayef	Declan McDonogh	Kevin Prendergast	1:12.50
2003	Wathab	Declan McDonogh	Kevin Prendergast	1:11.20
2004	Cherokee	Jamie Spencer	Aidan O'Brien	1:12.10
2005	Abigail Pett	Kevin Manning	Jim Bolger	1:15.30
2006	Rabatash	Wayne Lordan	David Wachman	1:11.30
2007	Norman Invader	Colm O'Donoghue	Ken Condon	1:12.12
2008	Maoineach	Kevin Manning	Jim Bolger	1:15.76
2009	Arctic	Pat Shanahan	Tracey Collins	1:20.10
2010	Dingle View	Cathy Gannon	David Evans	1:12.89
2011	Lightening Pearl	Johnny Murtagh	Ger Lyons	1:11.17
2012	Leitir Mor	Kevin Manning	Jim Bolger	1:12.90
2013	Great White Eagle	Joseph O'Brien	Aidan O'Brien	1:10.59
2014	Cappella Sansevero	Andrea Atzeni	Ger Lyons	1:13.49
2015	Smash Williams	Kevin Manning	Jim Bolger	1:14.54
2016	Intelligence Cross	Seamie Heffernan	Aidan O'Brien	1:12.06
2017	U S Navy Flag	Ryan Moore	Aidan O'Brien	1:12.73
2018	Ten Sovereigns	Donnacha O'Brien	Aidan O'Brien	1:12.02
2019	Lope Y Fernandez	Ryan Moore	Aidan O'Brien	1:12.76
2020	New Treasure	Kevin Manning	Jim Bolger	1:16.93
2021	Sacred Bridge	Colin Keane	Ger Lyons	1:12.60
2022	Treasure Trove	Billy Lee	Paddy Twomey	1:13.94
2023	Letsbefrankaboutit	Billy Lee	Paddy Twomey	1:11.70
2024	Ides Of March	Ryan Moore	Aidan O'Brien	1:12.75
2025	Mission Central	Wayne Lordan	Aidan O'Brien	1:12.36
2026	Push The Boat Out	Seamie Heffernan	Michael O'Callaghan	1:14.70

== See also ==
- Horse racing in Ireland
- List of Irish flat horse races
