= My Emma =

British-bred Thoroughbred racehorse

- Sire: Marju
- Grandsire: Last Tycoon
- Dam: Pato
- Damsire: High Top
- Sex: Mare
- Foaled: 19 March 1993
- Country: United Kingdom
- Colour: Bay
- Breeder: Victor Matthews, Baron Matthews
- Owner: Lord Matthews; Matthews Breeding and Racing
- Trainer: Rae Guest
- Record: 8: 3-0-2
- Earnings: £219,137

Major wins
- Prix Vermeille (1996); Yorkshire Oaks (1997)

My Emma (foaled 19 March 1993) was a British Thoroughbred racehorse and broodmare. She was lightly campaigned, making only eight racecourse appearances in three seasons. After finishing unplaced on her only start as a two-year-old she began her second season by finishing unplaced in the Lancashire Oaks before winning a minor race at Newmarket. She was then sent to France where she finished third in the Prix de Psyché before recording an upset win in the Group One Prix Vermeille. My Emma returned in 1997 and after finishing third on her seasonal debut she recorded a second Group One success in the Yorkshire Oaks. She was retired from racing at the end of the year and has had some success a broodmare.

== Background ==
My Emma is a bay mare with narrow white blaze bred in the United Kingdom by her owner Lord Matthews. She was sired by Marju, who won the St James's Palace Stakes and finished second in The Derby in 1991 before becoming a successful breeding stallion: his other offspring have included Viva Pataca, Soviet Song and Indigenous. My Emma's dam Pato was a moderate racehorse, winning four minor races from twenty-four starts between 1984 and 1986 but was better as a broodmare, producing Classic Cliche who won the St Leger in 1995 and the Ascot Gold Cup in the following year.

The filly was initially sent into training with Robert Williams but moved to the Chestnut Tree Stables of Rae Guest at Newmarket, Suffolk before her racing career began.

== Racing career ==
=== 1995: two-year-old season ===
My Emma did not appear on the racecourse until 9 October 1995 when she contested a maiden race over seven furlongs at Leicester Racecourse. Ridden by George Duffield, she started a 14/1 outsider and finished seventh of the eighteen runners behind the Paul Cole-trained Fairlight Down.

Lord Matthews died in December 1995 and his horses subsequently raced in the ownership of Matthews Breeding and Racing.

=== 1996: three-year-old season ===
In early 1996, My Emma developed a nasal polyp which required surgery and delayed the start of her season. On her first appearance as a three-year-old, My Emma, after an absence of almost nine months, was entered in the Group Three Lancashire Oaks at Haydock Park on 6 July. She started a 50/1 outsider, but ran well, taking the lead in the straight before finishing fifth of the ten runners behind Spout (winner of the John Porter Stakes), Phantom Gold (Ribblesdale Stakes), Ninotchka and Shemozzle. The filly was dropped in class for a maiden at Newmarket Racecourse later that month and won "easily" by two lengths from Flamands.

My Emma was then sent to France for the Prix de Psyché over 2000 metres at Deauville Racecourse on 10 August. Ridden for the first time Cash Asmussen she appeared to have every chance in the straight but finished third, beaten a short neck and three quarters of a length by the André Fabre-trained fillies Sangria and Binary. Despite her defeat, My Emma returned to France for the Group One Prix Vermeille (then a race confined to three-year-old fillies) over 2400 metres at Longchamp Racecourse on 15 September. The Prix Marcel Boussac winner Miss Tahiti started favourite whilst My Emma, with Asmussen again in the saddle was the 29/1 outsider in the ten-runner field. The other contenders included Luna Wells (Prix Saint-Alary), Papering (runner-up in the Nassau Stakes and the Yorkshire Oaks), Shamadara (Prix de Malleret), Zafzala (Ballyroan Stakes), Tulipa (Ribblesdale Stakes) and Bint Salsabil (Rockfel Stakes). Asmussen settled the filly in fifth as Papering set the pace before moving up on the inside in the straight. In a blanket finish, she took the lead inside the last 100 metres and won by a head from Papering with the subsequently disqualified Zafzala a head away in third. Miss Tahiti was a short neck away in fourth, just ahead of Leonila and Luna Wells.

=== 1997: four-year-old season ===
After an absence of more than ten months, My Emma returned to action as a four-year-old in the Prix Maurice de Nieuil over 2500 metres at Maisons-Laffitte Racecourse on 20 July 1997, in which she was matched against male opposition. Ridden by Darryll Holland, she started at odds of 11/2 and finished third of the five runners, beaten a head and half a length by Surgeon and Kutta. At York Racecourse on 20 August My Emma made her first appearance in England for over a year when she was one of eight fillies to contest the Yorkshire Oaks over one and a half miles. Reams of Verse started the 4/7 favourite after winning The Oaks with My Emma second choice in the betting alongside Whitewater Affair (Lupe Stakes, John Porter Stakes, Prix de Pomone). The other runners included Squeak, unbeaten in four races including the Lancashire Oaks, Papering, and Crown of Light (third in the Epsom Oaks). Holland restrained My Emma at the back of the field as Whitewater Affair set the pace, but began to make progress in the straight. My Emma overtook Whitewater Affair inside the final furlong and won "comfortably" by three quarters of a length, with Crown of Light taking third ahead of Reams of Verse.

My Emma's final race was the 1997 Prix de l'Arc de Triomphe, a race which had been her long-term target since the end of her three-year-old season. Her preparation for the race had been interrupted by a fall in a training session which left her with what Rae Guest described as "a great haematoma on her backside, a blood blister the size of half a football". Starting at odds of 16.1/1, she was restrained by Holland before moving forward in the straight but never looked likely to win and finished eleventh of the eighteen runners behind Peintre Celebre.

== Breeding record ==
My Emma was retired from racing to become a broodmare. In November 2005 she was offered for sale at Tattersalls and bought for 1,300,000 guineas by the Bloodstock agency BBA Ireland, acting for the Coolmore Stud. She has produced at least six winners from ten foals:

- First Exhibit, a bay filly, foaled in 1999, sired by Machiavellian. Unraced.
- Moments of Joy, bay filly, 2000, by Darshaan. Won two races including the Lillie Langtry Stakes.
- Light of Morn, grey filly, 2001, by Daylami. Won one race.
- Search for Royalty, chestnut colt, 2002, by Nashwan. Unplaced on only start.
- Eminencia, bay filly, 2003, by Sadler's Wells. Unraced.
- Love Bird, chestnut filly, 2006, by Pivotal. Won one race.
- Sword of Honour, bay colt (later gelded), 2007, by Montjeu. Won one race.
- Admiral of the Red, bay colt, 2008, by Galileo. Won one race.
- Red Rocks Point, bay colt, 2011, by Fastnet Rock. Won three races.
- Avyanna, filly, 2013, by Galileo

== Pedigree ==
Pedigree of My Emma (GB), bay mare, 1993
Sire Marju (IRE) 1988	Last Tycoon (IRE); 1983	Try My Best	Northern Dancer
Sire Marju (IRE) 1988	Last Tycoon (IRE); 1983	Try My Best	Sex Appeal
Sire Marju (IRE) 1988	Last Tycoon (IRE); 1983	Mill Princess	Mill Reef
Sire Marju (IRE) 1988	Last Tycoon (IRE); 1983	Mill Princess	Irish Lass
Sire Marju (IRE) 1988	Flame of Tara (IRE); 1980	Artaius	Round Table
Sire Marju (IRE) 1988	Flame of Tara (IRE); 1980	Artaius	Stylish Pattern
Sire Marju (IRE) 1988	Flame of Tara (IRE); 1980	Welsh Flame	Welsh Pageant
Sire Marju (IRE) 1988	Flame of Tara (IRE); 1980	Welsh Flame	Electric Flash
Dam Pato (GB) 1982	High Top (IRE); 1969	Derring-Do	Darius
Dam Pato (GB) 1982	High Top (IRE); 1969	Derring-Do	Sipsey Bridge
Dam Pato (GB) 1982	High Top (IRE); 1969	Camenae	Vimy
Dam Pato (GB) 1982	High Top (IRE); 1969	Camenae	Madrilene
Dam Pato (GB) 1982	Patosky (GB); 1969	Skymaster	Golden Cloud
Dam Pato (GB) 1982	Patosky (GB); 1969	Skymaster	Discipliner
Dam Pato (GB) 1982	Patosky (GB); 1969	Los Patos	Ballymoss
Dam Pato (GB) 1982	Patosky (GB); 1969	Los Patos	Patagonia (Family: 20-c)
