= Holy Roman Emperor (horse) =

Irish-bred Thoroughbred racehorse

- Sire: Danehill
- Grandsire: Danzig
- Dam: L'On Vite
- Damsire: Secretariat
- Sex: Stallion
- Foaled: 2004
- Country: Ireland
- Colour: Bay
- Breeder: Tower Bloodstock
- Owner: Sue Magnier
- Trainer: Aidan O'Brien
- Record: 7: 4-2-0
- Earnings: £414,496

Major wins
- Railway Stakes (2006); Phoenix Stakes (2006); Prix Jean-Luc Lagardère (2006)
- Last updated on June 21, 2007

Holy Roman Emperor is a retired Thoroughbred racehorse and a pensioned sire. He was a leading two-year-old racehorse, winning four races from seven runs in Europe in 2006.

== Background ==
Holy Roman Emperor was sired by Danehill out of L'On Vite, a daughter of Secretariat and Canadian Horse and Broodmare of the Year Fanfreluche. Holy Roman Emperor was trained by Aidan O'Brien at Ballydoyle.

== Racing career ==
In 2006 Holy Roman Emperor won two Group One races, the Phoenix Stakes where he defeated the Coventry Stakes winner Hellvelyn and subsequent Group One winning filly Miss Beatrix and the Prix Jean-Luc Lagardère where he defeated the useful French colt Battle Paint. He also defeated subsequent three-year-old mile champion Excellent Art producing a blistering turn of foot to win the Group Two Railway Stakes at the Curragh.

His greatest rival was Teofilo, to whom he finished runner-up twice, firstly in the National Stakes, and later in the Dewhurst Stakes. There was great anticipation of another year of races between the pair, but it was decided in March 2007 to retire Holy Roman Emperor to stud as a replacement for George Washington, who was suffering fertility problems (and was also a son of Danehill).

== Stud career ==
Holy Roman Emperor has been a "shuttle stallion" for Coolmore Stud, standing at Coolmore's main farm in Ireland during the Northern Hemisphere breeding season and travelling to Coolmore's Australia farm to cover mares during the Southern Hemisphere breeding season, but for the 2013 breeding season stands only in Ireland.

Holy Roman Emperor's first runner in the UK or Ireland, High Award trained by Tommy Stack won at the Curragh on March 21, 2010. On 6 May 2012, Holy Roman Emperor's daughter Homecoming Queen won the 1000 Guineas.

In the Year 2014, Designs On Rome, who was later voted as the Hong Kong Horse of the Year, won the Hong Kong Classic Cup, Hong Kong Derby and Queen Elizabeth II Cup.

=== Notable stock ===
Holy Roman Emperor is the sire of 16 individual Group 1 winners:

c = colt, f = filly, g = gelding

Foaled	Name	Sex	Major wins
2008	Rich Tapestry	g	Santa Anita Sprint Championship
2008	Smashing	f	Indian Oaks
2009	Homecoming Queen	f	1000 Guineas Stakes
2009	Rollout The Carpet	f	New Zealand 1000 Guineas
2010	Designs On Rome	g	Hong Kong Classic Cup; Hong Kong Derby; Queen Elizabeth II Cup; Hong Kong Gold Cup (twice)
2010	Morandi	c	Critérium de Saint-Cloud
2011	Beauty Only	g	Hong Kong Mile
2011	Be Safe	c	Indian Derby
2011	Glorious Empire	g	Sword Dancer Stakes
2011	Mongolian Khan	c	New Zealand Derby; Australian Derby; Caulfield Cup,
2011	Sheidel	f	Oakleigh Plate
2013	Maraton	c	Grande Prêmio Farwell; Grande Prêmio João Adhemar de Almeida Prado
2013	Salto Olímpico	c	Grande Prêmio Jockey Club de São Paulo
2015	Romanised	c	Irish 2,000 Guineas; Prix Jacques Le Marois
2015	Well Timed	f	German Oaks
2016	Rockemperor	c	Joe Hirsch Turf Classic Stakes
