= Homecoming Queen (horse) =

Irish-bred Thoroughbred racehorse

- Racing silks of Susan Magnier
- Sire: Holy Roman Emperor
- Grandsire: Danehill
- Dam: Lagrion
- Damsire: Diesis
- Sex: Mare
- Foaled: 23 April 2009
- Country: Ireland
- Colour: Bay
- Breeder: Tower Bloodstock
- Owner: Derrick Smith, Mrs John Magnier, Michael Tabor
- Trainer: Aidan O'Brien
- Record: 14: 4-1-2
- Earnings: £278,708

Major wins
- 1,000 Guineas Trial Stakes (2012); 1000 Guineas (2012)

Homecoming Queen is an Irish Thoroughbred racehorse. She showed moderate form as a two-year-old in 2011 but demonstrated dramatic improvement in the spring of 2012 and won the 1000 Guineas by nine lengths. She was beaten in her two subsequent races and was retired to stud in July 2012.

== Background ==
Homecoming Queen is a bay filly with a narrow white blaze and three white feet. She was sired by the Prix Jean-Luc Lagardère winner Holy Roman Emperor out of the mare Lagrion, making her a half-sister to the European Champions Dylan Thomas and Queen's Logic.

== Racing career ==
=== 2011: two-year-old season ===
Homecoming Queen was highly tried as a two-year-old, running eleven times. Racing in modest company, she lost her first seven races before winning a Nursery handicap race at Fairyhouse Racecourse in September. She then finished second in the Group Three C. L. Weld Park Stakes before winning the Listed Lanwades and Staffordstown Studs Stakes at the Curragh. On her final start of the season she was sent to Churchill Downs to contest the Breeders' Cup Juvenile Fillies in which she finished tailed off in last place behind My Miss Aurelia.

=== 2012: three-year-old season ===
On her three-year-old debut, Homecoming Queen finished unplaced in the Park Express Stakes at the Curragh on 25 March. In the Leopardstown 1000 Guineas Trial in April, Homecoming Queen led from the start and recorded her first Group Race win when beating Fire Lily by a neck. She was then sent to Newmarket on 6 May for the 1000 Guineas in which she started a 25/1 outsider and was regarded as a pacemaker for her better fancied stable companion Maybe, who started 13/8 favourite. Ridden by Ryan L. Moore, Homecoming Queen broke quickly and soon established a clear lead over the rest of the field. She was never seriously challenged and won very easily by nine lengths, the biggest winning margin since 1859. Three weeks after her win at Newmarket, Homecoming Queen started favourite for the Irish 1000 Guineas at the Curragh on much firmer ground but finished fourth of the eight runners behind the English-trained filly Samitar, having led until the final furlong.

At Royal Ascot in June, Homecoming Queen contested the Coronation Stakes. Racing on soft ground started 9/4 favourite in a field of ten fillies. Homecoming Queen led the race until the straight but weakened in the closing stages and finished eighth behind Fallen For You. In July it was announced that the filly was to be retired from racing. O'Brien said that "she was a brilliant filly and her performance at Newmarket was very special. She has a wonderful pedigree and did us all proud."

== Breeding record ==
Homecoming Queen was retired from racing to become a broodmare for the Coolmore Stus. Her first four foals were winners:

- First Of Spring, a chestnut filly, foaled in 2014, sired by Galileo. Won 2 races
- Berkeley Square, chestnut colt, 2015, by Galileo. Won 2 races
- Celtic High King, bay colt, 2017, by Galileo. Won 1 race.
- Shale, bay filly, 2018. Won Moyglare Stud Stakes

== Pedigree ==
Pedigree of Homecoming Queen (IRE), bay filly 2009
| Sire Holy Roman Emperor 2004 | Danehill; 1986 | Danzig | Northern Dancer |
| Sire Holy Roman Emperor 2004 | Danehill; 1986 | Danzig | Pas de Nom |
| Sire Holy Roman Emperor 2004 | Danehill; 1986 | Razyana | His Majesty |
| Sire Holy Roman Emperor 2004 | Danehill; 1986 | Razyana | Spring Adieu |
| Sire Holy Roman Emperor 2004 | L'On Vite; 1986 | Secretariat | Bold Ruler |
| Sire Holy Roman Emperor 2004 | L'On Vite; 1986 | Secretariat | Somethingroyal |
| Sire Holy Roman Emperor 2004 | L'On Vite; 1986 | Fanfreluche | Northern Dancer |
| Sire Holy Roman Emperor 2004 | L'On Vite; 1986 | Fanfreluche | Ciboulette |
| Dam Lagrion 1989 | Diesis; 1980 | Sharpen Up | Atan |
| Dam Lagrion 1989 | Diesis; 1980 | Sharpen Up | Rocchetta |
| Dam Lagrion 1989 | Diesis; 1980 | Doubly Sure | Reliance |
| Dam Lagrion 1989 | Diesis; 1980 | Doubly Sure | Soft Angels |
| Dam Lagrion 1989 | Wrap It Up; 1979 | Mount Hagen | Bold Bidder |
| Dam Lagrion 1989 | Wrap It Up; 1979 | Mount Hagen | Moonmadness |
| Dam Lagrion 1989 | Wrap It Up; 1979 | Doc Nan | Francis S |
| Dam Lagrion 1989 | Wrap It Up; 1979 | Doc Nan | Betty W (Family: 9-c) |
