= Roscommon Racecourse =

Horse racing venue in Ireland

Coordinates: 53°38′44.48″N 8°13′19.63″W

Roscommon Racecourse is a horse racing venue located in Roscommon, County Roscommon, Ireland, approximately 76 km north east of Galway and 136 km west of Dublin.

The course holds both flat and jump racing. Racing unofficially commenced in 1837, with the first official contests occurring in 1885. Apart from a 12-year hiatus between 1936 and 1948 racing has continued ever since. The feature race of the year at Roscommon is the €40,000 2 mile Grade 3 Kilbegnet Novice Chase, run at the end of September. The 1994 renewal saw top 2 mile chaser Sound Man beat Shawiya with subsequent Cheltenham Gold Cup winner Imperial Call back in third. The 2018 renewal was also strong. It was won by Ornua who went on to win the Grade 1 Doom Bar Maghull Novices Chase at Aintree from Cadmium who went on to win the Topham Trophy over the National fences also at Aintree. The course's most prestigious flat race is the Lenebane Stakes. There are nine meetings per year, all between May and September, and are run on either a Monday or a Tuesday.

The course is right-handed of about 1 mile 2 furlongs in length with an incline on approach to the winning post.

== Notable races ==
Month	DOW	Race Name	Type	Grade	Distance	Age/Sex
July	Tuesday	Lenebane Stakes	Flat	Listed	1m 3f	3yo +
September	Monday	Kilbegnet Novice Chase	Chase	Grade 3	2m	4yo +
