= Last Tycoon =

Irish-bred Thoroughbred racehorse (1983–2006)

- Sire: Try My Best
- Grandsire: Northern Dancer
- Dam: Mill Princess
- Damsire: Mill Reef
- Sex: Stallion
- Foaled: 1983
- Country: Ireland
- Colour: Bay
- Breeder: Kilfrush Stud Ltd.
- Owner: Richard C. Strauss
- Trainer: Robert Collet
- Record: 13: 8–0–0
- Earnings: US$683,438 (equivalent)

Major wins
- Prix d'Arenberg (1985); King's Stand Stakes (1986); Nunthorpe Stakes (1986); Prix de Saint-Georges (1986); Prix du Gros Chêne (1986); Breeders' Cup Mile (1986); Timeform rating: 131

Awards
- Leading sire in Australia (1994)
- Last updated on 11 October 2025

Last Tycoon (9 May 1983 – 27 May 2006) was an Irish-bred, French-trained Thoroughbred racehorse best known as a top-class sprinter and for winning the Breeders' Cup Mile. He was later as a leading sire in Australia.

== Background ==
Last Tycoon was bred in Ireland by his owner Richard C. Strauss's Kilfrush Stud Ltd. His sire was the 1978 Dewhurst Stakes winner Try My Best.

== Racing career ==
He was trained by Robert Collet from his base at Chantilly Racecourse. At age two Last Tycoon won three of his six starts, including the Prix d'Arenberg at Chantilly.

At age three the colt won two Group One five-furlong sprint races in England and two sprint conditions races in France. He was then sent to Santa Anita Park in Arcadia, California for the Breeders' Cup Mile over a distance well beyond any at which he had ever won. Lightly regarded by punters, who sent him off at 36:1 odds, under regular jockey Yves Saint-Martin Last Tycoon defeated thirteen runners to win the US$1 million event.

== Stud record ==
Retired to stud duty, Last Tycoon met with considerable success. He first stood in Ireland where he was third on the annual sires list in 1992 before being sent to Australia where he was the Leading sire in 1994. Overall, he sired 756 winners, including 48 stake/group winners, and nine champions. Last Tycoon's notable progeny includes:

- Bigstone, won Queen Elizabeth II Stakes and Prix d' Ispahan
- Ezzoud (1989) – won the G1 Eclipse Stakes (1994) and twice the G1 International Stakes in 1993 and 1994;
- Iglesia (1989)- Current 1200 metre record holder at Flemington(1.07.16).Sire of Written Tycoon.
- Knowledge (1994) – won Australia's G1 Blue Diamond Stakes;
- Lady Jakeo, won MVRC Australia Made Stakes and VATC Blue Diamond Stakes
- Le Zagaletta (1995 ) – multiple stakes winner in Australia.
- Lost World (IRE), won FR Grand Criterium
- Magic of Money, won AJC The Galaxy
- Mahogany – 1994 Australian Champion Racehorse of the Year, won the Australian Derby and Victoria Derby;
- Marju (1988) – winner of England's Craven Stakes and the Group One St. James's Palace Stakes. Sire of Soviet Song, Viva Pataca, Indigenous;
- O'Reilly (NZ) won the Levin Classic and Telegraph Handicap and had a successful stud career in New Zealand.
- Taipan (1992) – Italian Champion Older Horse (1997, 1998), German Champion Older Horse (1998);
- Tracy's Element (AUS) 1990, won SAF Computaform Sprint and SAF Star Sprint etc.
- Tycoon Lil won Canterbury Guineas and New Zealand Oaks.

Last Tycoon died on 27 May 2006 in Japan.
