= Try My Best =

American-bred, Irish-trained Thoroughbred racehorse

- Sire: Northern Dancer
- Grandsire: Nearctic
- Dam: Sex Appeal
- Damsire: Buckpasser
- Sex: Stallion
- Foaled: 28 April 1975
- Country: United States
- Colour: Bay
- Breeder: E. P. Taylor
- Owner: Robert Sangster
- Trainer: Vincent O'Brien
- Record: 5: 4-0-0
- Earnings: £48,389

Major wins
- Larkspur Stakes (1977); Dewhurst Stakes (1977); Vauxhall Trial Stakes (1978)

Awards
- Irish Champion Two-Year-Old Colt (1977); English Champion Two-year-old Colt (1977)
- Last updated on May 14, 2010

Try My Best (1975–1993) was an American-bred, Irish-trained Thoroughbred racehorse and sire. A son of Northern Dancer, he won the Dewhurst Stakes in 1978 and was the top-rated two-year-old in Britain and Ireland that year.

== Background ==
Try My Best was a bay horse with three white socks bred by E. P. Taylor. Try My Best was sired by Northern Dancer out of the mare Sex Appeal, who also produced his full brother El Gran Senor. The colt was conditioned for racing by the Irish trainer, Vincent O'Brien.

== Racing career ==
At age two Try My Best won the G III Larkspur Stakes at Leopardstown Racecourse in Ireland and the Group One Dewhurst Stakes at Newmarket Racecourse in England. The unbeaten 1977 Champion Two-Year-Old of England and Ireland won the Vauxhall Trial Stakes at Phoenix Park Racecourse at age three in 1978 following which owner Robert Sangster syndicated the colt for US$6 million. Try My Best then shocked his owners and the betting public when he finished last in the Classic 2,000 Guineas Stakes to winner, Roland Gardens. Injured, Try My Best never returned to racing.

== Stud record ==
Try My Best had limited fertility but was notably the sire of:

- Last Tycoon (b. 1983) – multiple stakes winner in France, England and the United States including the 1986 Group One Sprint Championship, King's Stand Stakes, and Breeders' Cup Mile. A successful sire and outstanding sire of sires.
- Waajib (b. 1983) – win Prix du Rond Point (1987), Diomed Stakes (1988), Queen Anne Stakes (1988) Sire of Royal Applause
- My Best Valentine (b. 1990) – durable Group race winner who competed for seven years in England and France. Wins include the Group One Prix de l'Abbaye de Longchamp at age eight.

Try My Best was sent to breeders in Japan in 1992.

== Pedigree ==
Pedigree of Try My Best (USA), bay stallion, 1975
| Sire Northern Dancer (CAN) 1961 | Nearctic (CAN); 1954 | Nearco | Pharos |
| Sire Northern Dancer (CAN) 1961 | Nearctic (CAN); 1954 | Nearco | Nogara |
| Sire Northern Dancer (CAN) 1961 | Nearctic (CAN); 1954 | Lady Angela | Hyperion |
| Sire Northern Dancer (CAN) 1961 | Nearctic (CAN); 1954 | Lady Angela | Sister Sarah |
| Sire Northern Dancer (CAN) 1961 | Natalma (USA); 1957 | Native Dancer | Polynesian |
| Sire Northern Dancer (CAN) 1961 | Natalma (USA); 1957 | Native Dancer | Geisha |
| Sire Northern Dancer (CAN) 1961 | Natalma (USA); 1957 | Almahmoud | Mahmoud |
| Sire Northern Dancer (CAN) 1961 | Natalma (USA); 1957 | Almahmoud | Arbitrator |
| Dam Sex Appeal (USA) 1970 | Buckpasser (USA); 1963 | Tom Fool | Menow |
| Dam Sex Appeal (USA) 1970 | Buckpasser (USA); 1963 | Tom Fool | Gaga |
| Dam Sex Appeal (USA) 1970 | Buckpasser (USA); 1963 | Busanda | War Admiral |
| Dam Sex Appeal (USA) 1970 | Buckpasser (USA); 1963 | Busanda | Businesslike |
| Dam Sex Appeal (USA) 1970 | Best In Show (USA); 1965 | Traffic Judge | Alibhai |
| Dam Sex Appeal (USA) 1970 | Best In Show (USA); 1965 | Traffic Judge | Traffic Court |
| Dam Sex Appeal (USA) 1970 | Best In Show (USA); 1965 | Stolen Hour | Mr Busher |
| Dam Sex Appeal (USA) 1970 | Best In Show (USA); 1965 | Stolen Hour | Late Date (Family: 8f) |
