= Strategic Choice =

American-bred Thoroughbred racehorse

- Racing silks of Martyn Arbib
- Sire: Alleged
- Grandsire: Hoist The Flag
- Dam: Danlu
- Damsire: Danzig
- Sex: Stallion
- Foaled: 4 March 1991
- Country: United States
- Colour: Bay
- Breeder: Martyn Arbib
- Owner: Martyn Arbib
- Trainer: Paul Cole
- Record: 34: 6-5-5
- Earnings: £792,661

Major wins
- John Porter Stakes (1995); Irish St. Leger (1995); Gran Premio di Milano (1996); Grand Prix de Deauville (1996); Bosphorus Trophy (1997)

Strategic Choice (4 March 1991 – after 2006) was an American-bred, British-trained Thoroughbred racehorse and stallion. In a racing career which lasted from April 1994 until July 2000 he competed in nine different countries – Britain, France, Italy, Germany, Ireland, Japan, Turkey, Canada and Hong Kong – and won six of his thirty-four races. Unraced as a two-year-old he won the John Porter Stakes and Irish St. Leger at four, the Gran Premio di Milano and Grand Prix de Deauville at five and the Bosphorus Trophy at six. He was also placed in the King George VI and Queen Elizabeth Stakes, Gran Premio del Jockey Club, Yorkshire Cup and St Simon Stakes. After his retirement from racing he had some success as a sire of National Hunt racing.

== Background ==
Strategic Choice was a bay stallion with a broad white blaze and two white socks bred in Kentucky by his owner Martyn Arbib, a British businessman who brought the colt back to the United Kingdom. The horse was trained by Paul Cole at Whatcombe, near Wantage in Oxfordshire and ridden in most of his races by Richard Quinn.

Strategic Choice was sired by Alleged who won the Prix de l'Arc de Triomphe in 1977 and 1978. Alleged later became a successful breeding stallion, and a strong influence for stamina: his best winners included Miss Alleged, Shantou, Law Society, Legal Case, Leading Counsel and Midway Lady. Strategic Choice's dam Danlu won only one minor race in Ireland as a two-year-old in 1987 but came from a good family, being a great-granddaughter of the CCA Oaks winner Levee whose other descendants included Shuvee and Meneval.

== Racing career ==
=== 1994: three-year-old season ===
After finishing second on his track debut in April, Strategic Choice started 4/7 a maiden race over ten furlongs at Newbury Racecourse on 14 May and won by one and a half lengths. He was then moved up very sharply in class for the Prix du Jockey Club at Chantilly Racecourse in June when he started a 49/1 outsider but finished fifth of the fifteen runners, three lengths behind the winner Celtic Arms. In his three remaining races as a three-year-old he finished last of seven in the Great Voltigeur Stakes at York, second in the Godolphin Stakes at Newmarket and second again in the St Simon Stakes at Newbury.

=== 1995: four-year-old season ===
Strategic Choice began his second season in the Group 3 John Porter Stakes at Newbury in April in which he started at odds of 12/1 in a ten-runner field which also included Broadway Flyer (Gordon Stakes), River North (Aral-Pokal), Linney Head (Sandown Classic Trial), Right Win (Gran Premio d'Italia) and Shambo (Geoffrey Freer Stakes). After tracking the leaders in the early stages he overtook Broadway Flyer inside the final furlong and won by a neck with a gap of three lengths back to Shambo in third.

In June he was sent to Italy and finished third behind the German champion Lando in the Gran Premio di Milano and then returned to England in July to contest Britain's most prestigious weight-for-age race the King George VI and Queen Elizabeth Stakes at Ascot Racecourse. He started a 25/1 outsider but exceeded expectations as he finished a close third behind Lammtarra and Pentire, with Winged Love, Carnegie and Environment Friend finishing behind.

After a six-week break Strategic Choice returned in the Grosser Preis von Baden and finished unplaced behind Germany. On 16 September the colt was sent to the Curragh Racecourse for the Irish St. Leger over fourteen furlongs and started the 6/1 third favourite behind Vintage Crop and Moonax. The best fancied of the other four runners were Oscar Schindler, who went on to win the race in 1996 and 1997 and the Michael Stoute-trained Zilzal Zamaan. Strategic Choice was restrained by Quinn in the early stages and turned into the straight in fourth place behind Zilzal Zamaan, Vintage Crop and Moonax before making "smooth headway" to contest the lead in the last quarter mile. He took the lead inside the furlong and fought off a sustained challenge from Moonax to win by a head. On his only subsequent start as a four-year-old the horse was sent to Paris for the Prix de l'Arc de Triomphe at Longchamp Racecourse in October but after racing prominently in the early stages he faded in the straight and finished unplaced behind Lammtarra.

=== 1996: five-year-old season ===
On his first appearance of 1996 Strategic Choice finished second to Classic Cliche in the Yorkshire Cup and was then sent to Italy for a second run in the Gran Premio di Milano. On this occasion he started favourite, went to the front before half way and won from his fellow British challengers Luso (Derby Italiano) and King's Theatre. Another run in Ascot's King George followed, but he was unable to reproduce his 1995 performance and finished last of the eight runners behind Pentire. In the Grand Prix de Deauville over 2500 metres in August he started the 7/1 fourth choice in the betting behind Tarator (Prix Hubert de Chaudenay), Water Poet (Prix de Reux) and High Baroque (Chester Vase). He took the lead after 1400 metres and despite running wide on the final turm he kept on well in the straight to win by a neck and a short head from Tarator and Percutant.

In October Strategic Choice returned to Milan for the Gran Premio del Jockey Club and finished third of the eight runners behind Shantou. On his final run of the year he was sent to Japan and started a 39/1 outsider for the Japan Cup at Tokyo Racecourse on 24 November. He produced one of his best performances as he dead-heated with Helissio for third behind Singspiel and Fabulous La Fouine: the horses who finished behind him included Awad, Pentire, Dance Partner and Bubble Gum Fellow.

=== 1997: six-year-old season ===
In the first half of 1997, Strategic Choice finished fifth to Helissio in the Prix Ganay and fourth behind Shantou in the Gran Premio de Milano. He ran in the King George at Ascot for a third time in July and finished sixth of the eight runners behind Swain. After finishing fourth in the Geoffrey Freer Stakes he was sent to Turkey to contest the Bosphorus Trophy over 2400 metres at Veliefendi Race Course on 14 September. He faced seven local runners including Bold Pilot as well as Aristid from Germany and Shavat (winner of the 1996 Russian Derby) from Russia. He took the lead 400 metres from the finish and won "very easily" by three lengths from Aristid and Bold Pilot despite being eased down by Quinn in the closing stages. On his final run of the season Strategic Choice was sent to Canada for the Canadian International Stakes at Woodbine Racetrack on 19 October in which he finished fourth to Chief Bearheart.

=== 1998–2000: later career ===
Strategic Choice remained in training for three more seasons but never won again. In 1998 he finished second in the Yorkshire Cup, third in the Grand Prix de Deauville and fourth in the Geoffrey Freer Stakes from five runs in Europe before ending the year with an unplaced effort in the Hong Kong Vase at Sha Tin Racecourse in December. His eight-year-old campaign was restricted to two races at Newmarket: he finished fourth in the Fred Archer Stakes in June and sixth in a minor event in the following month. He was back on the track but made no impact in two starts as he finished unplaced in handicap races at Haydock Park and Newmarket in July.

== Stud record ==
At the end of his racing career Strategic Choice was retired to stud. He was used primarily as a sire of National Hunt horses and was based at the Bracklynn Stud in Ireland. The best of his offspring included Bog Warrior (Drinmore Novice Chase, Galmoy Hurdle, Webster Cup Chase) and Grey Gold (winner of eight races).

== Pedigree ==
Pedigree of Strategic Choice (USA), bay stallion, 1991
Sire Alleged (USA) 1974	Hoist The Flag (USA); 1968	Tom Rolfe*	Ribot*
Sire Alleged (USA) 1974	Hoist The Flag (USA); 1968	Tom Rolfe*	Pocahontas*
Sire Alleged (USA) 1974	Hoist The Flag (USA); 1968	Wavy Navy	War Admiral*
Sire Alleged (USA) 1974	Hoist The Flag (USA); 1968	Wavy Navy	Triomphe
Sire Alleged (USA) 1974	Princess Pout (USA); 1966	Prince John	Princequillo
Sire Alleged (USA) 1974	Princess Pout (USA); 1966	Prince John	Not Afraid
Sire Alleged (USA) 1974	Princess Pout (USA); 1966	Determined Lady	Determine
Sire Alleged (USA) 1974	Princess Pout (USA); 1966	Determined Lady	Tumbling*
Dam Danlu (USA) 1985	Danzig (USA); 1977	Northern Dancer	Nearctic
Dam Danlu (USA) 1985	Danzig (USA); 1977	Northern Dancer	Natalma
Dam Danlu (USA) 1985	Danzig (USA); 1977	Pas de Nom	Admirals Voyage
Dam Danlu (USA) 1985	Danzig (USA); 1977	Pas de Nom	Petitioner
Dam Danlu (USA) 1985	Lulu Mon Amour (USA); 1980	Tom Rolfe*	Ribot*
Dam Danlu (USA) 1985	Lulu Mon Amour (USA); 1980	Tom Rolfe*	Pocahontas*
Dam Danlu (USA) 1985	Lulu Mon Amour (USA); 1980	Sister Shu	Nashua
Dam Danlu (USA) 1985	Lulu Mon Amour (USA); 1980	Sister Shu	Levee (Family:9-f)

* Strategic Choice is inbred 3S x 3D to the stallion Tom Rolfe, meaning that he appears third generation on the sire side of his pedigree and third generation on the dam side of his pedigree.

* Strategic Choice is inbred 4S x 5S to the stallion War Admiral, meaning that he appears fourth generation and fifth generation (via Tumbling) on the sire side of his pedigree.
