= Grand Prix de Deauville =

Flat horse race in France

- Class: Group 2
- Location: Deauville Racecourse; Deauville, France
- Inaugurated: 1866
- Race type: Flat / Thoroughbred
- Sponsor: Lucien Barrière
- Website: france-galop.com

Race information
- Distance: 2,500 metres (1m 4½f)
- Surface: Turf
- Track: Right-handed
- Qualification: Three-years-old and up
- Weight: 54½ kg (3yo); 58½ kg (4yo+); Allowances; 1½ kg for fillies and mares Penalties; 3 kg for Group 1 winners * 3 kg if two Group 2 wins * 1½ kg if one Group 2 win * 1½ kg if two Group 3 wins * * since October 1 last year
- Purse: €200,000 (2021); 1st: €114,000

Grand Prix de Deauville
2024
| Quantanamera | Arrest | Sacred Spirit |

Previous years
2023
Jack Darcy | Al Nayyir | Haya Zark
2022
Botanik | Stay Foolish | Fenelon
2021
Glycon | The Good Man | Sublimis

2020-2011
2020
Telecaster | Soft Light | Ziyad
2019
Ziyad | Soft Light | Nagano Gold
2018
Loxley | Master's Spirit | Salouen
2017
Tiberian | Doha Dream | Travelling Man
2016
Savoir Vivre | Siljan's Saga | Erupt
2015
Siljan's Saga | Cocktail Queen | Loresho
2014
Cocktail Queen | Gatewood | Going Somewhere
2013
Tres Blue | Penglai Pavilion | Slow Pace
2012
Masterstroke | Gatewood | Ok Coral
2011
Cirrus Des Aigles | Silver Pond | Marinous

2010–2001
2010
Marinous | Redwood | La Boum
2009
Jukebox Jury | Pouvoir Absolu | Kasbah Bliss
2008
Getaway | Doctor Dino | Poseidon Adventure
2007
Irish Wells | Poet Laureate | Champs Elysees
2006
Irish Wells | Groom Tesse | Marend
2005
Marend | Policy Maker | Fracassant
2004
Cherry Mix | Martaline | Bailador
2003
Policy Maker | Polish Summer | Craig's Falcon
2002
Polish Summer | Califet | Fair Mix
2001
Holding Court | Marienbard | Idaho Quest

2000–1991
2000
Russian Hope | Daring Miss | Mont Rocher
1999
Courteous | Bimbola | Public Purse
1998
Epistolaire | Sibling Rival | Strategic Choice
1997
Taipan | Camporese | Lord Of Men
1996
Strategic Choice | Tarator | Percutant
1995
Swain | Zilzal Zamaan | Sunrise Song
1994
White Muzzle | Bright Moon | Jackdidi
1993
Snurge | Petit Loup | Husband
1992
Modhish | Snurge | Djais
1991
Snurge | Crnagora | Pigeon Voyageur

1990–1986
1990
Robertet | Theatre Critic | French Glory
1989
Borromini | Norberto | Apache
1988
Ibn Bey | Sudden Victory | Luth Dancer
1987
Almaarad | Saronicos | Productive
1986
Baby Turk | Faburola | Night Line

The Grand Prix de Deauville is a Group 2 flat horse race in France open to thoroughbreds aged three years or older. It is run at Deauville over a distance of 2,500 metres (about 1 mile and 4½ furlongs), and it is scheduled to take place each year in August.

== History ==
The event was established in 1866, and it was originally called the Coupe de Deauville. It was initially contested over 2,400 metres.

The race was renamed the Grand Prix de Deauville in 1871. It was opened to foreign horses in 1872, and was subsequently won by international contenders such as Kincsem and Tristan. Its distance was increased to 2,500 metres in 1886, and to 2,600 metres in 1903.

The event was known as the Grand Prix de Trouville-Deauville from 1908 to 1911. It was abandoned throughout World War I, with no running from 1914 to 1918.

The Grand Prix de Deauville was cancelled once during World War II, in 1940. For the remainder of this period, while its regular venue was closed, it was switched between Longchamp (1941–42, 1945), Maisons-Laffitte (1943) and Le Tremblay (1944). The Longchamp and Maisons-Laffitte editions were contested over 2,500 metres.

The race's distance was extended to 2,700 metres in 1973. Its present length, 2,500 metres, was introduced in 1990.

== Records ==
Most successful horse (3 wins):

- Tristan – 1882, 1883, 1884

Leading jockey (5 wins):

- Yves Saint-Martin – Bounteous (1962), Val de Loir (1963), Ashmore (1976), Perrault (1981), Baby Turk (1986)
- Dominique Boeuf – Borromini (1989), Robertet (1990), Policy Maker (2003), Irish Wells (2006, 2007)

Leading trainer (10 wins):

- André Fabre – Zalataia (1983), Borromini (1989), Modhish (1992), Swain (1995), Epistolaire (1998), Polish Summer (2002), Cherry Mix (2004), Getaway (2008), Masterstroke (2012), Botanik (2022)

Leading owner (5 wins):

- Frédéric de Lagrange – Montgoubert (1867), Trocadero (1868), Mortemer (1869), Nougat (1876), Castillon (1881)
- Daniel Wildenstein – Schönbrunn (1970), Ashmore (1974, 1976), Air de Cour (1985), Robertet (1990)

== Winners since 1978 ==
| Year | Winner | Age | Jockey | Trainer | Owner | Time |
|---|---|---|---|---|---|---|
| 1978 | Santalino | 5 | Georges Doleuze | Alain Bruneteau | J. Bruneau de la Salle | 2:55.20 |
| 1979 | First Prayer | 5 | Maurice Philipperon | Robert Collet | Jacques de Hesdin |
| 1980 | Glenorum | 3 | Lester Piggott | David Smaga | Helen Stollery | 2:56.10 |
| 1981 | Perrault | 4 | Yves Saint-Martin | Pierre Pelat | Thierry van Zuylen | 2:58.60 |
| 1982 | Real Shadai | 3 | Maurice Philipperon | John Cunnington Jr. | Zenya Yoshida | 2:59.00 |
| 1983 | Zalataia | 4 | Freddy Head | André Fabre | Francis Baral | 3:01.60 |
| 1984 | Ti King | 3 | Cash Asmussen | François Boutin | Stavros Niarchos | 3:00.10 |
| 1985 | Air de Cour | 3 | Éric Legrix | Patrick Biancone | Daniel Wildenstein | 3:14.10 |
| 1986 | Baby Turk | 4 | Yves Saint-Martin | Alain de Royer-Dupré | Anne-Marie d'Estainville | 3:18.50 |
| 1987 | Almaarad | 4 | Willie Carson | John Dunlop | Hamdan Al Maktoum | 3:01.40 |
| 1988 | Ibn Bey | 4 | Michael Roberts | Paul Cole | Fahd Salman | 3:00.40 |
| 1989 | Borromini | 3 | Dominique Boeuf | André Fabre | Paul de Moussac | 3:10.50 |
| 1990 | Robertet | 4 | Dominique Boeuf | Élie Lellouche | Daniel Wildenstein | 2:48.50 |
| 1991 | Snurge | 4 | Richard Quinn | Paul Cole | Martyn Arbib | 2:46.30 |
| 1992 | Modhish | 3 | Thierry Jarnet | André Fabre | Sheikh Mohammed | 2:55.50 |
| 1993 | Snurge | 6 | Richard Quinn | Paul Cole | Martyn Arbib | 2:42.60 |
| 1994 | White Muzzle | 4 | John Reid | Peter Chapple-Hyam | Teruya Yoshida | 2:55.40 |
| 1995 | Swain | 3 | Thierry Jarnet | André Fabre | Sheikh Mohammed | 2:46.10 |
| 1996 | Strategic Choice | 5 | Richard Quinn | Paul Cole | Martyn Arbib | 2:44.30 |
| 1997 | Taipan | 5 | Pat Eddery | John Dunlop | 4th Baron Swaythling | 2:53.80 |
| 1998 | Epistolaire | 3 | Thierry Jarnet | André Fabre | Edouard de Rothschild | 2:41.60 |
| 1999 | Courteous | 4 | Pat Eddery | Paul Cole | Fahd Salman | 2:46.50 |
| 2000 | Russian Hope | 5 | Christophe Soumillon | Henri-Alex Pantall | Edouard de Rothschild | 2:40.50 |
| 2001 | Holding Court | 4 | Philip Robinson | Michael Jarvis | John Good | 2:41.30 |
| 2002 | Polish Summer | 5 | Olivier Peslier | André Fabre | Khalid Abdullah | 2:44.60 |
| 2003 | Policy Maker ^{[a]} | 3 | Dominique Boeuf | Élie Lellouche | Ecurie Wildenstein | 2:52.10 |
| 2004 | Cherry Mix | 3 | Thierry Gillet | André Fabre | Lagardère Family | 2:55.10 |
| 2005 | Marend | 4 | Stéphane Pasquier | Dominique Sépulchre | Mrs A. Elias de Proenca | 2:50.40 |
| 2006 | Irish Wells | 3 | Dominique Boeuf | François Rohaut | Berend van Dalfsen | 2:50.10 |
| 2007 | Irish Wells | 4 | Dominique Boeuf | François Rohaut | Berend van Dalfsen | 2:45.50 |
| 2008 | Getaway | 5 | Frankie Dettori | André Fabre | Georg von Ullmann | 2:48.20 |
| 2009 | Jukebox Jury | 3 | Royston Ffrench | Mark Johnston | Alan Spence | 2:49.70 |
| 2010 | Marinous | 4 | Davy Bonilla | Freddy Head | Saeed Al Romaithi | 2:46.80 |
| 2011 | Cirrus des Aigles | 5 | Franck Blondel | Corine Barande-Barbe | Jean-Claude Dupouy | 2:45.00 |
| 2012 | Masterstroke | 3 | Mickael Barzalona | André Fabre | Godolphin | 2:39.10 |
| 2013 | Tres Blue | 3 | Fabrice Veron | Henri-Alex Pantall | Horst Rapp | 2:44.49 |
| 2014 | Cocktail Queen | 4 | Alexis Badel | Myriam Bollack-Badel | Jeff Smith | 2:51.84 |
| 2015 | Siljan's Saga | 5 | Pierre-Charles Boudot | Jean-Pierre Gauvin | De Besset & Tassin | 2:49.19 |
| 2016 | Savoir Vivre | 3 | Maxime Guyon | Jean-Pierre Carvalho | Stall Ullmann | 2:51.73 |
| 2017 | Tiberian | 5 | Olivier Peslier | Alain Couetil | Earl Haras du Logis, H Volz & S Falk | 2:44.68 |
| 2018 | Loxley | 3 | William Buick | Charlie Appleby | Godolphin | 2:44.00 |
| 2019 | Ziyad | 4 | Olivier Peslier | Carlos Laffon-Parias | Wertheimer et Frère | 2:38.20 |
| 2020 | Telecaster | 4 | Christophe Soumillon | Hughie Morrison | Castle Down Racing | 2:48.29 |
| 2021 | Glycon | 5 | Cristian Demuro | Jean-Claude Rouget | Scea Haras De Saint Pair | 2:39.96 |
| 2022 | Botanik | 4 | Mickael Barzalona | André Fabre | Godolphin | 2:36.23 |
| 2023 | Jack Darcy | 4 | Cristian Demuro | Paul & Oliver Cole | Gascoigne, Williams, Vincent, Burns, 3d | 2:49.01 |
| 2024 | Quantanamera | 4 | Stephane Pasquier | Andreas Suborics | Jurgen Sartori | 2:46.29 |
| 2025 | Sibayan | 4 | Mickael Barzalona | Francis-Henri Graffard | Aga Khan Studs SCEA | 2:40.35 |
| 2026 | Al Aasy | 9 | Pierre-Charles Boudot | William Haggas | Shadwell Estate | 2:48.20 |

^{a} Polish Summer finished first in 2003, but he was relegated to second place following a stewards' inquiry.

== Earlier winners ==
- 1866: Affidavit
- 1867: Montgoubert
- 1868: Trocadero
- 1869: Mortemer
- 1870: Dutch Skater
- 1871: La Perichole
- 1872: Bivouac
- 1873: Sir John
- 1874: Perla
- 1875: Saint Cyr
- 1876: Nougat
- 1877: Vinaigrette
- 1878: Kincsem
- 1879: El Rey
- 1880: Le Destrier
- 1881: Castillon
- 1882: Tristan
- 1883: Tristan
- 1884: Tristan
- 1885: Althorp
- 1886: Polyeucte
- 1887: Pythagoras
- 1888: Galaor
- 1889: Le Sancy
- 1890: Le Sancy
- 1891: Yellow
- 1892: Naviculaire
- 1893: Galette
- 1894: Algarade
- 1895: Merlin
- 1896: Riposte
- 1897: Van Diemen
- 1898: Le Samaritain
- 1899: Fourire
- 1900: Monsieur Amedee
- 1901: Jacobite
- 1902: Maximum
- 1903: Shebdiz
- 1904: Turenne
- 1905: Ecots
- 1906: Maintenon
- 1907: Punta Gorda
- 1908: Cheikh
- 1909: Biniou
- 1910: Joie
- 1911: Basse Pointe
- 1912: Gorgorito
- 1913: Isard
- 1914–18: no race
- 1919: Verdier
- 1920: Tullamore
- 1921: Zagreus
- 1922: Bahadur
- 1923: São Paulo
- 1924: Swansea
- 1925: Dark Diamond
- 1926: Asteroide
- 1927: Le Polisson
- 1928: La Futelaye
- 1929: Charlemagne
- 1930: Rieur
- 1931: Celerina
- 1932: Confidence
- 1933: Queen of Scots
- 1934: Morvillars
- 1935: Ping Pong
- 1936: Fantastic
- 1937: Saint Preux
- 1938: Terre Rose
- 1939: Birikil
- 1940: no race
- 1941: Jock
- 1942: Adaris
- 1943: Cordon Rouge
- 1944: Verso II
- 1945: Basileus
- 1946: Kerlor
- 1947: Le Paillon
- 1948: Turmoil
- 1949:
- 1950: Alizier
- 1951: Coast Guard
- 1952: Damaka
- 1953: Flute Enchantee
- 1954: Doux Vert
- 1955: Rosa Bonheur
- 1956: Tall Chief
- 1957: Scot
- 1958: Chippendale
- 1959: Fils de Roi
- 1960: Wordpam
- 1961: Molvedo
- 1962: Bounteous
- 1963: Val de Loir
- 1964: Sailor
- 1965: Sailor
- 1966: Lionel
- 1967: Lionel
- 1968: Soyeux
- 1969: Djakao
- 1970: Schönbrunn
- 1971: Miss Dan
- 1972: Novius
- 1973: Card King
- 1974: Ashmore
- 1975: L'Ensorceleur *
- 1976: Ashmore
- 1977: Dom Alaric

* Duke of Marmalade finished first in 1975, but he was relegated to fifth place following a stewards' inquiry.

== See also ==
- List of French flat horse races
- Recurring sporting events established in 1866 – this race is included under its original title, Coupe de Deauville.
