= Pass the Peace =

Irish-bred Thoroughbred racehorse

- Sire: Alzao
- Grandsire: Lyphard
- Dam: Lover's Rose
- Damsire: King Emperor
- Sex: Mare
- Foaled: 30 April 1986
- Country: Ireland
- Colour: Bay
- Breeder: John Kent
- Owner: Brian Bell
- Trainer: Paul Cole; Michael Bell
- Record: 11: 5-3-1
- Earnings: £483,006

Major wins
- Debutante Stakes (1988); Cheveley Park Stakes (1988); Fred Darling Stakes (1989)

Pass the Peace (30 April 1986 – 2010) was an Irish-bred, British-trained Thoroughbred racehorse and broodmare. She was one of the best two-year-old fillies of her generation in Britain and Ireland in 1988, when she won four races including the Debutante Stakes and the Cheveley Park Stakes. After winning the Fred Darling Stakes on her three-year-old debut she failed to win again, although she was placed in both the Poule d'Essai des Pouliches and the Sun Chariot Stakes. She later became a successful broodmare.

== Background ==
Pass the Peace was a bay mare bred in Ireland by John Kent. She was sired by Alzao, a son of Lyphard who never won above Group Three level, but became a successful breeding stallion, his progeny including Alborada, Second Set and Shahtoush. Pass the Peace's dam Lover's Rose, was a minor winner in Ireland and a half-sister of the Geoffrey Freer Stakes winner Swell Fellow. She was descendant of the broodmare Grace Dalrymple, the female-line ancestor of the Australian champion Manikato.

As a yearling, Pass the Peace was offered for sale and bought by Brian Bell. The filly was initially sent into training with Paul Cole at Whatcombe in Oxfordshire. She was ridden in all but one of her races by Richard Quinn.

== Racing career ==
=== 1988: two-year-old season ===
Pass the Peace made her racecourse debut in a five furlong maiden race at Salisbury Racecourse on 24 May. She started the 9/4 favourite, led for most of the way and won by a length from Whisper the Wind. She started favourite again in the Acorn Stakes at Epsom Downs Racecourse on 4 June but was beaten four lengths into second place by Waki Rainbow. On her next appearance she won a minor event at Windsor Racecourse in July beating Memphis Blues by a length, with a six length gap back to the rest of the nine runners.

Pass the Peace was then moved up in class and sent to Ireland for the Group Three Debutante Stakes over six furlongs at Phoenix Park Racecourse on 20 August and started the 8/1 third favourite behind her fellow British challengers Miss Secreto and Shyoushka. She recorded her first major success as she won by two lengths from Blasted Heath with Miss Secreto a length away in third.

On 28 September Pass the Peace ended her season in the Cheveley Park Stakes (then the only British Group One race restricted to two-year-old fillies) over six furlongs at Newmarket Racecourse. The undefeated Dancing Tribute started the odds-on favourite with Pass the Peace the 5/1 second choice in the betting, whilst the other five runners were Jaljuli, Mrs Jenney, Gloriella (Queen Mary Stakes), Konbola and Bocas Rose (St Hugh's Stakes). Quinn settled the filly before overtaking the front-running Gloriella in the last quarter mile. She stayed on well in the closing stages to win by two lengths from Dancing Tribute with Jaljuli a length and a half away in third place.

=== 1989: three-year-old season ===
For the 1989 season, Brian Bell removed Pass the Peace from Cole's stable and sent her to be trained by his son Michael Bell, who had just begun training at Newmarket. Michael Bell had worked as an assistant to Cole who once told him "all you're going to do is pick my brains and pinch my owners".

Bell had not trained a winner before Pass the Peace appeared in the Fred Darling Stakes (a trial race for the 1000 Guineas) over seven furlongs at Newbury Racecourse on 14 April. Starting the 11/8 favourite against nine opponents, she took the lead approaching the final furlong and drew away to win by two and a half lengths from Russian Royal with five lengths and a short head back to Spring Sparkle and the Waterford Candelabra Stakes winner Life at the Top in third and fourth. In an unusually small field of seven for the 1000 Guineas on 4 May, she started the joint second favourite at odds of 7/2. She raced in second place for most of the way but was unable to quicken in the closing stages and finished fifth behind Musical Bliss.

Ten days after her defeat at Newmarket, Pass the Peace was sent to France for the Poule d'Essai des Pouliches over 1600 metres at Longchamp Racecourse. She was amongst the leaders from the start and kept on well in the straight and finished second of the sixteen runners, three quarters of a length behind Pearl Braceclet and the same distance ahead of Golden Opinion. The filly returned to France for the Prix de Diane over 2100 metres at Chantilly Racecourse on 11 June. She was in fourth place entering the straight but then faded and finished twelfth of the fourteen runners behind Lady in Silver.

After a break of almost four months, Pass the Peace returned in the Sun Chariot Stakes (then a Group Two race over ten furlongs) at Newmarket on 7 October. Ridden for the first and only time by George Duffield she finished third of the nine runners behind Braiswick and Life at the Top. On her final racecourse appearance, the filly was sent to Italy three weeks later to contest the Group Three Premio Bagutta over 1600 metres at the San Siro Racecourse in Milan. She was reunited with Quinn and finished second, one and a half lengths behind the locally trained Rosa de Caerleon.

== Breeding record ==
Pass the Peace was retired from racing to become a broodmare for Sheikh Mohammed's Darley Stud. She produced at least ten foals and six winners between 1992 and 2007:

- Puck's Castle, a bay filly, foaled in 1992, sired by Shirley Heights. Won one race.
- Nanshan, bay filly, 1993, sired by Nashwan. Failed to win in two races. Grand-dam of Atlantic Jewel.
- Embassy, bay filly, 1995, by Cadeaux Genereux. Won three races including the Princess Margaret Stakes and Cheveley Park Stakes. Grand-dam of King's Apostle (Prix Maurice de Gheest).
- Areen Alasad, bay colt, 1996, by Cadeaux Genereux. Failed to win in eight races.
- Tarfshi, bay filly, 1998, by Mtoto. Won five races including the Hoppings Stakes, Dahlia Stakes and Pretty Polly Stakes.
- Bayhirr, bay colt, 2001, by Selkirk. Won one race.
- Andorra, filly, 2003, by Cadeaux Genereux. Unraced.
- Malyana, bay filly, 2004, by Mtoto. Won three races.
- Two Pass, bay filly, 2005, by Mtoto. Unraced.
- Shelfah, brown filly, 2007, by Selkirk. Won one race.

Pass the Peace died in 2010.

== Pedigree ==
Pedigree of Pass the Peace (IRE), bay mare, 1986
Sire Alzao (USA) 1980	Lyphard (USA); 1969	Northern Dancer	Nearctic
Sire Alzao (USA) 1980	Lyphard (USA); 1969	Northern Dancer	Natalma
Sire Alzao (USA) 1980	Lyphard (USA); 1969	Goofed	Court Martial
Sire Alzao (USA) 1980	Lyphard (USA); 1969	Goofed	Barra
Sire Alzao (USA) 1980	Lady Rebecca (GB); 1971	Sir Ivor	Sir Gaylord
Sire Alzao (USA) 1980	Lady Rebecca (GB); 1971	Sir Ivor	Attica
Sire Alzao (USA) 1980	Lady Rebecca (GB); 1971	Pocahontas	Roman
Sire Alzao (USA) 1980	Lady Rebecca (GB); 1971	Pocahontas	How
Dam Lover's Rose (IRE) 1976	King Emperor (USA); 1966	Bold Ruler	Nasrullah
Dam Lover's Rose (IRE) 1976	King Emperor (USA); 1966	Bold Ruler	Miss Disco
Dam Lover's Rose (IRE) 1976	King Emperor (USA); 1966	Irish Jay	Double Jay
Dam Lover's Rose (IRE) 1976	King Emperor (USA); 1966	Irish Jay	Irish Witch
Dam Lover's Rose (IRE) 1976	Nonnie (GB); 1962	Dumbarnie	Dante
Dam Lover's Rose (IRE) 1976	Nonnie (GB); 1962	Dumbarnie	Lost Soul
Dam Lover's Rose (IRE) 1976	Nonnie (GB); 1962	Rossenhall	Chamossaire
Dam Lover's Rose (IRE) 1976	Nonnie (GB); 1962	Rossenhall	Grace Abounding (Family: 8-f)
