= Ibn Bey =

British-bred Thoroughbred racehorse

- Racing silks of Fahd Salman
- Sire: Mill Reef
- Grandsire: Never Bend
- Dam: Rosia Bay
- Damsire: High Top
- Sex: Stallion
- Foaled: 22 March 1984
- Country: United Kingdom
- Colour: Chestnut
- Breeder: Lord Porchester
- Owner: Fahd Salman; Yustane Sohma
- Trainer: Paul Cole
- Record: 29:10-3-4
- Earnings: $3,724,131

Major wins
- Predominate Stakes (1987); Gran Premio d'Italia (1987); Grand Prix de Deauville (1988); Prix Maurice de Nieuil (1989); Geoffrey Freer Stakes (1989); Silver Cup Stakes (1989); Preis von Europa (1989); Grosser Preis von Berlin (1990); Irish St. Leger (1990)

Ibn Bey (22 March 1984 – 10 December 2012) was a British-bred Thoroughbred racehorse and sire who won major races in the United Kingdom, France, Ireland, Italy and Germany as well as competing in the United States and Japan. After winning once as a two-year-old in 1986 he won the Predominate Stakes in 1987 before recording his first Group One success in the Gran Premio d'Italia. He continued to improve with age and developed into a formidable international campaigner over long distances winning the Grand Prix de Deauville, Prix Maurice de Nieuil, Geoffrey Freer Stakes, Preis von Europa, Grosser Preis von Berlin and Irish St. Leger. On his penultimate start he produced arguably his best performance when finishing second in the Breeders' Cup Classic. He was retired from racing to become a breeding stallion in Japan where he had limited impact as a sire of winners.

== Background ==
Ibn Bey was a big, powerful chestnut horse with a white star and white socks on his hind legs bred by Lord Porchester. He was sired by Mill Reef the 1971 Epsom Derby winner who went on to be Leading sire in Great Britain and Ireland in 1978 and 1987. Ibn Bey's dam, Rosia Bay, was a daughter of the broodmare Ouija, who was also the dam of Teleprompter, the grandam of Ouija Board and the great-grandam of Australia. Rosia Bay herself went on to produce the Yorkshire Oaks winner Roseate Tern.

As a yearling, Ibn Bey was sold for 210,000 guineas to the Saudi Fahd Salman. The colt was sent into training with Paul Cole at his stable at Whatcombe in Oxfordshire.

== Racing career ==
=== 1986: two-year-old season ===
Ibn Bey made his racecourse debut in the Danepak Bacon Stakes over one mile at Newmarket Racecourse in August. He stayed on well in the closing stages to finish fourth of the six runners behind Lack A Style. In October he recorded his first success by beating thirteen opponents in a maiden race at Haydock Park Racecourse.

=== 1987: three-year-old season ===
After finishing fifth behind Legal Bid in the Lingfield Derby Trial on his three-year-old debut, Ibn Bey contested the Predominate Stakes at Goodwood Racecourse, a trial race for The Derby and won by two lengths from Alwasmi and Classic Tale. In the Derby he started at odds of 40/1 and finished thirteenth of the nineteen runners behind Reference Point. He finished fourth at Goodwood in July and then ran third behind Moon Madness and Legal Bid in the Geoffrey Freer Stakes. In September, Ibn Bey was sent to Italy for the Group One Gran Premio d'Italia over 2400 metres at Milan and won the race by ten lengths form Jung. On his final appearance of the season, the colt ran poorly in the Irish St. Leger at the Curragh, finishing sixth of the eight runners behind Eurobird.

=== 1988: four-year-old season ===
Ibn Bey was beaten in his first four races of 1988. He finished third under top weight of 128 pounds in the Aston Park Stakes at Newbury, fourth behind Almaarad in the Hardwicke Stakes at Royal Ascot, fourth, beaten 26 lengths, by Unfuwain in the Princess of Wales's Stakes at Newmarket, and fourth again in the Geoffrey Freer Stakes in August. On his final appearance of the season, he was sent to France to contest the Grand Prix de Deauville over 2700 metres on 28 August. Ridden by Michael Roberts, he took the lead 400 metres from the finish and won by two lengths from the Barry Hills-trained Sudden Victory.

=== 1989: five-year-old season ===
As a five-year-old, Ibn Bey again began his season in the Aston Park Stakes and finished second to Albadr, to whom he was conceding six pounds. He was then moved up in distance for the Henry II Stakes over two miles at Sandown Park Racecourse and finished fifth, more than thirteen lengths behind the winner Sadeem. In July he was dropped in class and distance for a Listed race over fourteen furlongs at Lingfield Park Racecourse and defeated the odds-on favourite Mountain Kingdom (winner of the Ormonde Stakes and Yorkshire Cup) by two lengths. In this race he was ridden for the first time by Richard Quinn, who became his regular jockey. Later that month Ibn Bey was sent to France again and won the Group Two Prix Maurice de Nieuil and won by a short neck from the André Fabre-trained three-year-old Mardonius. Two weeks later, Ibn Bey made his third attempt to win the Geoffrey Freer Stakes. Starting at odds of 9/2, he raced in second before overhauling the favourite Apache in the final strides to win by a head.

In September, Ibn Bey was sent to Germany for the Group One Preis von Europa over 2400 metres at Cologne in which his opponents included Sheriff's Star (Coronation Cup, Grand Prix de Saint-Cloud) and Mondrian (German Derby, Grosser Preis von Berlin, Aral-Pokal, Grosser Preis von Baden). Ibn Bey took the lead soon after the start and drew away from his opponents in the straight to record his fourth consecutive victory, winning by six lengths from Mondrian. On his appearance of the season, Ibn Bey was sent to contest the Japan Cup at Tokyo Racecourse on 26 November. He led the field for most of the way, but was overtaken in the straight and finished sixth behind the New Zealand mare Horlicks who won in a world record time of 2:22.2.

=== 1990: six-year-old season ===
In 1990 Ibn Bey began by finishing third to Creator and In The Wings in the Prix Ganay and then ran third to In The Wings in the Coronation Cup. In June he was ridden by Mick Kinane in the Gran Premio di Milano, but finished fourth, more than twelve lengths behind the winner Tisserand. In July Ibn Bey was reunited with Quin and returned to Germany for the Grosser Preis von Berlin in which he faced a field which included Mondrian as well as the German Derby winner Karloff. He recorded his fourth Group One victory, beating Mondrian by four lengths. Ibn Bey and Mondrian met for the third time in the Grosser Preis von Baden in September and on this occasion the German horse won. Ibn Bey led for most of the race but was caught inside the final furlong and beaten by a length.

Three weeks after his defeat in Germany, Ibn Bey contested the Irish St. Leger over fourteen furlongs at the Curragh and started the 5/1 second favourite behind the 1989 St Leger Stakes winner Michelozzo. He raced in second place behind the three-year-old Thetford Forest (later to win the Sun Alliance Novices' Hurdle) before taking the lead two furlong from the finish. He was headed by the outsider Mr Pintips but rallied to regain the advantage 100 yards from the finish and won by a length. After this race he entered the ownership of Yustane Sohma.

Ibn Bey was sent to the United States to contest the seventh running of the Breeders' Cup Classic at Belmont Park on 27 October when he raced on dirt for the first time, and ran over a distance shorter than one and a half miles for the first time since 1986. His opponents included Unbridled, Go and Go, Izvestia, Opening Verse and Rhythm. Ibn Bey was positioned just behind the leaders before turning into the straight in second place. He caught the leader Thirty Six Red inside the final furlong but was immediately overtaken on the inside by Unbridled and finished second, beaten a length by the winner. On his final appearance, on 25 November, Ibn Bey made a second attempt to win the Japan Cup. Ridden by a local jockey, he was held up in the early stages and despite making some progress in the straight he never reached the leaders and finished eighth behind the Australian gelding Better Loosen Up.

== Assessment ==
In 1986, the independent Timeform organisation gave Ibn Bey a rating of 88p, the "p" indicating that the colt was likely to make more than normal improvement. In the following year he was given a rating if 117 by Timeform, whilst the official International Classification rated him on 118, seventeen pounds behind the top-rated Reference Point. Ibn Bey was later rated the best three-year-old colt to race in Italy in 1988.

== Stud record ==
Ibn Bey was retired to Japan where he stood as a breeding stallion at the Big Red Farm. He sired 79 winners, including the Group I Derby Grand Prix winner Taiki Herakles. He was pensioned from stud duty in 2007 and Died on 10 December 2012 at the age of 28.

== Pedigree ==
Pedigree of Ibn Bey, chestnut stallion, 1984
Sire Mill Reef (USA) 1968	Never Bend (USA); 1960	Nasrullah	Nearco
Sire Mill Reef (USA) 1968	Never Bend (USA); 1960	Nasrullah	Mumtaz Begum
Sire Mill Reef (USA) 1968	Never Bend (USA); 1960	Lalun	Djeddah
Sire Mill Reef (USA) 1968	Never Bend (USA); 1960	Lalun	Be Faithful
Sire Mill Reef (USA) 1968	Milan Mill (USA); 1962	Princequillo	Prince Rose
Sire Mill Reef (USA) 1968	Milan Mill (USA); 1962	Princequillo	Cosquilla
Sire Mill Reef (USA) 1968	Milan Mill (USA); 1962	Virginia Water	Count Fleet
Sire Mill Reef (USA) 1968	Milan Mill (USA); 1962	Virginia Water	Red Ray
Dam Rosia Bay (GB) 1977	High Top (IRE); 1969	Derring-Do	Darius
Dam Rosia Bay (GB) 1977	High Top (IRE); 1969	Derring-Do	Sipsey Bridge
Dam Rosia Bay (GB) 1977	High Top (IRE); 1969	Camenae	Vimy
Dam Rosia Bay (GB) 1977	High Top (IRE); 1969	Camenae	Madrilene
Dam Rosia Bay (GB) 1977	Ouija (GB); 1971	Silly Season	Tom Fool
Dam Rosia Bay (GB) 1977	Ouija (GB); 1971	Silly Season	Double Deal
Dam Rosia Bay (GB) 1977	Ouija (GB); 1971	Samanda	Alycidon
Dam Rosia Bay (GB) 1977	Ouija (GB); 1971	Samanda	Gradisca (Family:12-b)
