= Gran Premio di Milano =

- Class: Group 3
- Location: San Siro Racecourse; Milan, Italy
- Inaugurated: 1889
- Race type: Flat / Thoroughbred
- Website: San Siro

Race information
- Distance: 2,000 metres (1 1/4 miles)
- Surface: Turf
- Track: Right-handed
- Qualification: Three-years-old and up
- Weight: 53½ kg (3y); 60½ kg (4y+); Allowances; 1½ kg for fillies and mares
- Purse: €242,000 (2015); 1st: €114,750

The Gran Premio di Milano is a Group 3 flat horse race in Italy open to thoroughbreds aged three years or older. It is run at Milan over a distance of 2,000 metres (about 1¼ miles), and it is scheduled to take place each year in June.

The event was established in 1889, and during the early part of its history it was contested over 3,000 metres. It was run over 2,600 metres in 1971, and it reverted to its former length the following year. It was cut to 2400 metres in 1974 and again to 2000 metres (its present distance) in 2019. The race was formerly contested at Group 1 level before being downgraded from the 2016 running. After 2023, the race is contested at Group 3 level.

== Records ==
Most successful horse (2 wins):

- Sansonetto – 1895, 1896
- Keepsake – 1903, 1905
- Burne Jones – 1918, 1919
- Manistee – 1924, 1925
- Cranach – 1927, 1928
- Mexico – 1961, 1962
- Marco Visconti – 1966, 1967
- Tony Bin – 1987, 1988
- Quijano – 2008, 2009
- Dylan Mouth – 2015, 2016

Leading jockey since 1970 (3 wins):

- Frankie Dettori – Shantou (1997), Sudan (2007), Dylan Mouth (2016)

Leading trainer since 1986 (4 wins):

- Stefano Botti – Biz The Nurse (2013), Dylan Mouth (2015), Full Drago (2017), Flag's Up (2024)

Leading owner since 1986 (3 wins):

- Scuderia Effevi – Jakkalberry (2010), Dylan Mouth (2015, 2016)

== Winners since 1986 ==
Year	Winner	Age	Jockey	Trainer	Owner	Time
1986	Tommy Way	3	Willie Carson	John Dunlop	Scuderia Erasec	2:29.3
1987	Tony Bin	4	Michel Jerome	Luigi Camici	Allevamento White Star	2:27.0
1988	Tony Bin	5	Pat Eddery	Luigi Camici	Allevamento White Star	2:39.4
1989	Alwuhush	4	Willie Carson	John Dunlop	Hamdan Al Maktoum	2:26.3
1990	Tisserand	5	Vincenzo Mezzatesta	Mario Vincis	Agricola All. La Madia	2:26.4
1991	Snurge	4	Richard Quinn	Paul Cole	Martyn Arbib	2:29.8
1992	Mashaallah	4	Steve Cauthen	John Gosden	Ahmed Al Maktoum	2:31.5
1993	Platini	4	Mark Rimmer	Bruno Schütz	Stall Steigenberger	2:31.7
1994	Petit Loup	5	Walter Swinburn	Criquette Head	Maktoum Al Maktoum	2:29.7
1995	Lando	5	Michael Roberts	Heinz Jentzsch	Gestüt Ittlingen	2:24.8
1996	Strategic Choice	5	Richard Quinn	Paul Cole	Martyn Arbib	2:27.2
1997	Shantou	4	Frankie Dettori	John Gosden	Sheikh Mohammed	2:26.0
1998	Ungaro	4	Terence Hellier	Hans Blume	Gestüt Röttgen	2:29.0
1999	Dark Moondancer	4	Gérald Mossé	Alain de Royer-Dupré	Ben Arbib	2:30.8
2000	Endless Hall	4	Fernando Jovine	Luca Cumani	Il Paralupo SRL	2:28.6
2001	Paolini	4	Andreas Suborics	Andreas Wöhler	Carde Ostermann-Richter	2:34.8
2002	Falbrav	4	Dario Vargiu	Luciano d'Auria	Scuderia Rencati	2:24.9
2003	Leadership	4	Richard Hills	Saeed bin Suroor	Godolphin	2:28.3
2004	Senex	4	William Mongil	Hans Blume	Stall Meerbusch	2:28.7
2005	Electrocutionist	4	Edmondo Botti	Valfredo Valiani	Earle I. Mack	2:30.6
2006	Shamdala	4	Christophe Soumillon	Alain de Royer-Dupré	HH Aga Khan IV	2:28.7
2007	Sudan	4	Frankie Dettori	Élie Lellouche	Gary A. Tanaka	2:32.1
2008	Quijano	6	Andrasch Starke	Peter Schiergen	Gestüt Fährhof	2:34.7
2009	Quijano	7	Andrasch Starke	Peter Schiergen	Gestüt Fährhof	2:29.6
2010	Jakkalberry	4	Fabio Branca	Edmondo Botti	Scuderia Effevi	2:29.6
2011	Voila Ici	6	Mirco Demuro	Vittorio Caruso	Scuderia Incolinx	2:34.4
2012	Earl of Tinsdal	4	William Buick	Andreas Wöhler	Sunrace Stables	2:30.0
2013	Biz the Nurse	3	Cristian Demuro	Stefano Botti	Scuderia Aleali	2:27.4
2014	Benvenue	5	Federico Bossa	Raffaele Biondi	Scuderia Incolinx	2:26.4
2015	Dylan Mouth	4	Fabio Branca	Stefano Botti	Scuderia Effevi	2:26.7
2016	Dylan Mouth	5	Frankie Dettori	Marco Botti	Scuderia Effevi	2:35.9
2017	Full Drago	4	Dario Vargiu	Stefano Botti	Dioscuri Srl	2:29.1
2018	Night Music	5	Oisin Murphy	Sarah Steinberg	Stall Salzburg	2:27.3
2019	Assiro	4	Andrea Mezzatesta	Raffaele Biondi	Luigi Roveda	2:27.0
2020	Durance^{[a]}	4	Lukas Delozier	Peter Schiergen	Gestut Ebbesloh	2:01.4
2021	Wally^{[a]}	4	Cristian Demuro	Jean-Claude Rouget	Ecurie Jean-Pierre Barjon	1:59.3
2022	Cantocorale^{[a]}	4	Antonio Fresu	Grizzetti Galoppo SRL	Scuderia Blueberry SRL	2:02.9
2023	Best Of Lips ^{[a]}	5	Rene Piechulek	Andreas Suborics	Stall Lintec	2:02.9
2024	Flag's Up ^{[a]}	6	Mario Sanna	Stefano Botti	Roberto Saggini	2:06.7
2025	Arnis Master ^{[a]}	6	Adrie de Vries	Andreas Suborics	Stall Siepenblick	2:01.5
2026	Woodchuck ^{[a]}	6	Antonio Orani	N Bellanger	David Dromard	2:01.3

^{a} Start with 2020, the races distance was 2,000 Meters

== Earlier winners ==
- 1889: Amulio
- 1890: Fitz Hampton
- 1891: Clarisse
- 1892: Odin
- 1893: Ova
- 1894: Times
- 1895: Sansonetto
- 1896: Sansonetto
- 1897: Hira
- 1899: Spartivento
- 1900: Aigle Royal
- 1901: Marcantonio
- 1902: Montalbano
- 1903: Keepsake
- 1904: The Oak
- 1905: Keepsake
- 1906: Massena
- 1907: Pioniere
- 1908: Acacia
- 1909: Fidia
- 1910: Etoile de Feu
- 1911: Sablonnet
- 1912: Rembrandt
- 1913: Misraim
- 1914: Austerlitz
- 1915: Peerless
- 1916: Tronador
- 1917: Aristippo
- 1918: Burne Jones
- 1919: Burne Jones
- 1920: Ghiberti
- 1921: Valerius
- 1922: Lantorna
- 1923: Scopas
- 1924: Manistee
- 1925: Manistee
- 1926: Apelle
- 1927: Cranach
- 1928: Cranach
- 1929: Ortello
- 1930: Cavaliere d'Arpino
- 1931: Guernanville
- 1932: Sanzio
- 1933: Crapom
- 1934: Navarro
- 1935: Partenio
- 1936: Archidamia
- 1937: Donatello
- 1938: Nearco
- 1939: Vezzano
- 1940: Sirte
- 1941: Niccolo dell'Arca
- 1942: Arco
- 1943: Orsenigo
- 1944: Macherio
- 1945: Fante
- 1946: Gladiolo
- 1947: Tenerani
- 1948: Astolfina
- 1949: Antonio Canale
- 1950: Fiorillo
- 1951: Scai
- 1952: Neebisch
- 1953: Toulouse Lautrec
- 1954: Botticelli
- 1955: Oise
- 1956: Ribot
- 1957: Braque
- 1958: Sedan
- 1959: Exar
- 1960: Malhoa
- 1961: Mexico
- 1962: Mexico
- 1963: Veronese
- 1964: Prince Royal
- 1965: Accrale
- 1966: Marco Visconti
- 1967: Marco Visconti
- 1968: Stratford
- 1969: Epidendrum
- 1970: Beaugency
- 1971: Weimar
- 1972: Beau Charmeur
- 1973: Garvin
- 1974: Orsa Maggiore
- 1975: Star Appeal
- 1976: Rouge Sang
- 1977: Sirlad
- 1978: Stuyvesant
- 1979: Sortingo
- 1980: Marracci
- 1981: Lydian
- 1982: Terreno
- 1983: Diamond Shoal
- 1984: Esprit du Nord
- 1985: Shulich

== See also ==
- List of Italian flat horse races
