= Culture Vulture =

American-bred Thoroughbred racehorse

- Racing silks of Mr Christopher Wright
- Sire: Timeless Moment
- Grandsire: Damascus
- Dam: Perfect Example
- Damsire: Far North
- Sex: Mare
- Foaled: 23 April 1989
- Country: United States
- Colour: Chestnut
- Breeder: Holtsinger Inc.
- Owner: Chris Wright
- Trainer: Paul Cole
- Record: 18:6-2-4
- Earnings: £466,012

Major wins
- Lowther Stakes (1991); Fillies' Mile (1991); Prix Marcel Boussac (1991); Poule d'Essai des Pouliches (1992); Premio Emilio Turati (1993)

Awards
- European Champion Two-Year-Old Filly (1991)
- Last updated on 20 September 2006

Culture Vulture was an American-bred, British-trained champion Thoroughbred racehorse. At the inaugural Cartier Racing Awards in 1991, she was named European Champion Two-Year-Old Filly. In her championship season she won four of her six races including two at Group One level: the Fillies' Mile in England and the Prix Marcel Boussac in France. As a three-year-old she became the first British-trained filly to win the Poule d'Essai des Pouliches.

== Background ==
Although Culture Vulture was trained in England, her pedigree was entirely North American (see below). She was bred at Versailles, Kentucky by Holtsinger Inc. She was sired by Timeless Moment out of the Far North mare Perfect Example.

Timeless Moment was a sprinter who won the Princeton Handicap and the Nassau County Handicap. Apart from Culture Vulture, his progeny included the Breeders' Cup Juvenile winner Gilded Time and the Hollywood Oaks winner Moment To Buy. Perfect Example produced nine other winning foals including Purrfectly, the dam of the Hollywood Oaks winner Santa Catarina.

Culture Vulture was trained throughout her career by Paul Cole at Whatcombe, near Wantage, Oxfordshire. She was ridden in all but one of her races by Cole's stable jockey Richard Quinn. She was owned by Chris Wright, the founder of Chrysalis Records.

== Racing career ==
=== 1991: two-year-old season ===
Culture Vulture began her career in a maiden race at Newbury in May. She won by three and a half lengths after taking the lead a furlong out. She was immediately stepped up to Group class for the Queen Mary Stakes at Royal Ascot. Culture Vulture finished strongly after being unable to find a clear run in the last quarter mile to finish a length second to Marling, a filly who went on to win four Group One races.

Two months later, Culture Vulture was moved up to Group Two level for the Lowther Stakes at York. She was made second favourite behind the Molecomb Stakes winner Sahara Star but was never in danger of defeat, taking the lead at half way and pulling clear to win by four lengths.

In the Autumn Culture Vulture was stepped up in class and distance for the Group One Fillies' Mile at Ascot, for which she was made favourite, just ahead of the Henry Cecil-trained Midnight Air. The two fillies both made their challenges two furlongs out and Culture Vulture was "badly bumped" as Pat Eddery pulled Midnight Air to the outside. Midnight Air crossed the line three quarters of a length in front but a Stewards' Inquiry disqualified her for causing interference and awarded the race to Culture Vulture.

Culture Vulture's last European race of the season was the Prix Marcel Boussac at Longchamp in which she faced a strong field including the previous Group race winners Kenbu, Guislaine and Verveine, as well as other promising fillies such as Red Slippers and Hatoof. Quinn settled the filly in the early stages before taking the lead in the straight. Culture Vulture ran on under strong pressure to hold off a challenge from Hatoof by a short head. Kenbu, in fifth, was beaten a length further than she had been beaten by Arazi in the Prix Morny.

On her final start of the year, Culture Vulture was sent to America for her first start on dirt, and finished ninth of the fourteen runners in the Breeders' Cup Juvenile Fillies. Cole noted that Culture Vulture effectively "refused to race" on the surface.

=== 1992: three-year-old season ===
Culture Vulture began her three-year-old season by running third to the unbeaten Musicale in the Fred Darling Stakes at Newbury and then finished fifth behind Hatoof, Marling and Kenbu in the 1000 Guineas.

In her next race, she was sent back to France for the Poule d'Essai des Pouliches and produced what was probably her best performance. After turning into the straight in eighth place, she quickened to take the lead a furlong from the finish and was driven out by Richard Quinn to win the Group One race by half a length from Hydro Calido, with Hatoof and Kenbu sixth and seventh respectively. She was the first foreign-trained filly to win the race and her winning time of 1:37.00 was a race record. At around this time, Culture Vulture's owners reportedly turned down an offer of $1,500,000 for the filly from the Japanese owner Mitsuo Haga.

Although there were seven runners for the Coronation Stakes at Royal Ascot the betting suggested that the contest was effectively a match between Culture Vulture and Marling, and the two fillies dominated the race as expected. Marling took the lead a furlong out and held off Culture Vulture's persistent challenge to win by three-quarters of a length with the other runners at least six lengths further back.

Culture Vulture was then off the racecourse for almost four months, missing an intended run in the Prix du Moulin, before running a disappointing third in a Listed race at Ascot. Another unsuccessful attempt at the Breeders's Cup ended her year, as she finished unplaced behind Paseana in the Distaff at Gulfstream Park.

=== 1993: four-year-old season ===
Culture Vulture was kept in training at four and showed early promise by running third in the Lockinge Stakes on her debut. She followed up with her last important victory, beating Prospective Ruler by a neck in the Premio Emilio Turati in Milan.

She was the beaten favourite in a Group Two race at the Curragh three weeks later, and in July finished third to Niche in the Falmouth Stakes. She was fourth of ten behind Bigstone in the Sussex Stakes before ending her career by running unplaced in the Prix du Moulin.

== Race record ==
Date	Race	Dist (f)	Course	Class	Prize (£K)	Odds	Runners	Placing	Margin	Time	Jockey	Trainer
17 May 1991	Hatherden Maiden Stakes	6	Newbury	M	3	5/2	8	1	3.5	1:15.57	Richard Quinn	Paul Cole
19 June 1991	Queen Mary Stakes	5	Ascot	3	24	8/1	14	2	1	1:02.51	Richard Quinn	Paul Cole
22 August 1991	Lowther Stakes	6	York	2	38	85/40	4	1	4	1:12.44	Richard Quinn	Paul Cole
28 September 1991	Fillies' Mile	8	Ascot	1	91	5/2	7	1	0.75	1:46.11	Richard Quinn	Paul Cole
6 October 1991	Prix Marcel Boussac	8	Longchamp	1	81	4/1	14	1	short head	1:40.60	Richard Quinn	Paul Cole
2 November 1991	Breeders' Cup Juvenile Fillies	8.5	Churchill Downs	1	269	5.7/1	14	9	8.75	1:46.40	Richard Quinn	Paul Cole
10 April 1992	Fred Darling Stakes	7	Newbury	3	18	7/2	6	3	6	1:35.22	Richard Quinn	Paul Cole
30 April 1992	1000 Guineas	8	Newmarket Rowley	1	111	14/1	14	5	9.5	1:39.45	Richard Quinn	Paul Cole
17 May 1992	Poule d'Essai des Pouliches	8	Longchamp	1	102	13.1/1	9	1	0.5	1:37.00	Richard Quinn	Paul Cole
17 June 1992	Coronation Stakes	8	Ascot	1	107	9/2	7	2	0.75	1:39.01	Richard Quinn	Paul Cole
9 October 1992	October Stakes	8	Ascot	Listed	13	2/1	7	3	0.75	1:46.99	Richard Quinn	Paul Cole
31 October 1992	Breeders' Cup Distaff	9	Gulfstream Park	1	276	48/1	14	13	9.5	1:48.00	Richard Quinn	Paul Cole
14 May 1993	Lockinge Stakes	8	Newbury	2	38	15/2	10	3	1.25	1:39.31	Richard Quinn	Paul Cole
6 June 1993	Premio Emilio Turati	8	San Siro	2	43		9	1	neck	1:39.20	Richard Quinn	Paul Cole
27 June 1993	International Stakes	8	The Curragh	2	28	5/4	9	6	1.75	1:39.00	Richard Quinn	Paul Cole
7 July 1993	Falmouth Stakes	8	Newmarket July	2	38	13/2	11	3	6.5	1:37.08	Pat Eddery	Paul Cole
28 July 1993	Sussex Stakes	8	Goodwood	1	79	28/1	10	4	5.5	1:40.19	Richard Quinn	Paul Cole
5 September 1993	Prix du Moulin	8	Longchamp	1	107	9.2/1	11	9	8.5	1:37.60	Richard Quinn	Paul Cole

== Assessment ==
Culture Vulture was named European Champion Two-Year-Old Filly in the inaugural Cartier Racing Awards.

She was the highest-rated two-year-old filly to race in France in 1991.

As a four-year-old she was the highest-rated older filly or mare in England and Italy.

== Stud career ==
Culture Vulture produced three known foals and one winner, the filly Japan (by Caerleon). Her last known foal was born in 1998.

== Pedigree ==
Pedigree of Culture Vulture (USA), chestnut mare, 1989
Sire Timeless Moment (USA) 1970	Damascus(USA); 1964	Sword Dancer (USA)	Sunglow (USA)
Sire Timeless Moment (USA) 1970	Damascus(USA); 1964	Sword Dancer (USA)	Highland Fling (USA)
Sire Timeless Moment (USA) 1970	Damascus(USA); 1964	Kerala (USA)	My Babu (FRA)
Sire Timeless Moment (USA) 1970	Damascus(USA); 1964	Kerala (USA)	Blade of Time (USA)
Sire Timeless Moment (USA) 1970	Hour of Parting (USA); 1963	Native Dancer(USA)	Polynesian (USA)
Sire Timeless Moment (USA) 1970	Hour of Parting (USA); 1963	Native Dancer(USA)	Geisha (USA)
Sire Timeless Moment (USA) 1970	Hour of Parting (USA); 1963	Sweet Sorrow (USA)	Count Fleet (USA)
Sire Timeless Moment (USA) 1970	Hour of Parting (USA); 1963	Sweet Sorrow (USA)	Athene (USA)
Dam Perfect Example (USA) 1982	Far North (CAN); 1973	Northern Dancer (CAN)	Nearctic (CAN)
Dam Perfect Example (USA) 1982	Far North (CAN); 1973	Northern Dancer (CAN)	Natalma (USA)
Dam Perfect Example (USA) 1982	Far North (CAN); 1973	Fleur (CAN)	Victoria Park (CAN)
Dam Perfect Example (USA) 1982	Far North (CAN); 1973	Fleur (CAN)	Flaming Page (CAN)
Dam Perfect Example (USA) 1982	Bold Example (USA); 1969	Bold Lad (USA)	Bold Ruler (USA)
Dam Perfect Example (USA) 1982	Bold Example (USA); 1969	Bold Lad (USA)	Misty Morn (USA)
Dam Perfect Example (USA) 1982	Bold Example (USA); 1969	Lady Be Good (USA)	Better Self (USA)
Dam Perfect Example (USA) 1982	Bold Example (USA); 1969	Lady Be Good (USA)	Past Eight (USA) (Family: 8h)

- Apart from My Babu all of Culture Vulture's ancestors in the first four generations of her pedigree were bred in North America.
