= Bint Pasha =

American-bred Thoroughbred racehorse

- Sire: Affirmed
- Grandsire: Exclusive Native
- Dam: Icely Polite
- Damsire: Graustark
- Sex: Mare
- Foaled: 7 March 1984
- Country: United States
- Colour: Chestnut
- Breeder: Spendthrift Thoroughbred Breeding
- Owner: Fahd Salman
- Trainer: Paul Cole
- Record: 16: 4-4-0

Major wins
- Pretty Polly Stakes (1987); Yorkshire Oaks (1987); Prix Vermeille (1987)

Awards
- Timeform rating 102 (1986), 126 (1987)

Bint Pasha (7 March 1984 – 2006) was an American-bred British-trained Thoroughbred racehorse and broodmare. She showed promise as a juvenile in 1986 when she won once and finished fourth in the Fillies' Mile. In the following year she emerged as a top class performer when moved up in distance, finishing fourth in the Oaks Stakes before winning the Pretty Polly Stakes in Ireland, the Yorkshire Oaks in England and the Prix Vermeille in France. She failed to win in three starts in 1988 and was retired from racing. She had some success as a broodmare, producing at least eight winners.

== Background ==
Bint Pasha was a "rangy", dark-coated chestnut mare bred in Kentucky by Spendthrift Thoroughbred Breeding. She was from the fourth crop of foals sired by Affirmed, the winner of the American Triple Crown in 1978. The best of his other progeny included Flawlessly, Peteski and The Tin Man. Bint Pasha was the only foal produced by her dam, Icely Polite, a winner of four minor races who died in 1984 at the age of five. Icely Polite was a distant descendant of the American broodmare Judy O'Grady who was the ancestor of many important winners including Green Dancer, Authorized and Dream Well.

The filly was consigned as a yearling to the Fasig-Tipton Sale in August 1985 and was bought for $220,000 by the bloodstock agent Anthony Penfold on behalf of Fahd Salman. She was sent to Europe and entered training with Paul Cole at Whatcombe stables in Oxfordshire. She was ridden in most of her races by Richard Quinn.

== Racing career ==
=== 1986: two-year-old season ===
As a two-year-old in 1986 Bint Basha finished second in her first three races. In July at Sandown Park Racecourse she recorded her first success when she won a maiden race over seven furlongs by five lengths. She was then moved up in class for the Group Three May Hill Stakes over one mile at Doncaster Racecourse in September and finished seventh behind Laluche in a slowly-run race. Later that month she started a 33/1 outsider for the Group Two Fillies' Mile at Ascot Racecourse and produced her best effort of the year to finish fourth behind Invited Guest, Mountain Memory and Shining Water.

=== 1987: three-year-old season ===
After finishing unplaced over one mile on her three-year-old debut, Bint Pasha showed improved form when moved up in distance for the Lupe Stakes (a trial race for The Oaks) over ten furlongs at Goodwood Racecourse in May. She led for most of the way but was caught approaching the final furlong and beaten two lengths by the Henry Cecil-trained Scimitarra. On 6 June at Epsom Downs Racecourse Bint Pasha started a 66/1 outsider in an eleven-runner field the 209th running of the Oaks. After falling behind the leaders approaching the final turn (she was reportedly unsuited by the course) she stayed on in the straight to finish fourth behind Unite, Bourbon Girl and Three Tails. Scimitarra had started 5/2 favourite but sustained a career-ending injury in the last quarter mile. Later in June she was sent to Ireland for the Pretty Polly Stakes over ten furlongs at the Curragh. Racing on soft ground for the first time she recorded her first major success, beating the Barry Hills-trained Blessed Event by a head with the pair finishing well clear of the opposition.

Bint Pasha faced Blessed Event again in the Yorkshire Oaks over one and a half miles at York Racecourse on 18 August. Three Tails started favourite on 5/2 after winning the Lancashire Oaks with Bourbon Girl (who had finished second to Unite in the Irish Oaks) the second choice at 3/1. Bint Pasha and Blessed Event were next in the betting on 5/1 whilst the other runners were Eurobird (later to win the Irish St Leger), Island Lake (third in the Lancashire Oaks), Shining Water, Known Line and Debach Delight. Quinn tracked the leaders before sending the filly into the lead three furlongs out. Bint Pasha held off a sustained challenge from Blessed Event to win by one and a half lengths with a gap of six lengths back to Bourbon Girl in third.

On 13 September, Bint Pasha was sent to France and started favourite for the Prix Vermeille over 2400 metres at Longchamp Racecourse, a race which serves as a trial for the Prix de l'Arc de Triomphe. Three Tails and Blessed Event were again in opposition whilst the other runners included Teresa (the top three-year-old in Spain), Khariyda (later to win the E. P. Taylor Stakes and the Premio Lydia Tesio), River Memories (Prix Maurice de Nieuil, Prix de Pomone), Karmiska (Prix de la Nonette) and Swept Away (Prix Chloé). Ridden by Pat Eddery, she took the lead soon after the start and opened up a three length advantage entering the straight. She was never seriously challenged and won by two and a half lengths from Three Tails with the outsider Something True taking third ahead of Khariyda. Bint Pasha bypassed the Prix de l'Arc de Triomphe and ended her season with a trip to California for the Breeders' Cup Turf at Hollywood Park Racetrack on 21 November. She reportedly responded badly to the journey and finished last of the fourteen runners behind Theatrical.

=== 1988: four-year-old season ===
Bint Pasha remained in training as a four-year-old but failed to win in three races. She finished last of four behind Triptych in the Coronation Cup and eighth of ten behind Village Star in the Grand Prix de Saint-Cloud. On her final appearance she finished fourth of the seven runners behind Ela Romara in the Nassau Stakes at Goodwood on 30 July.

== Assessment ==
In 1986, Bint Pasha was given a rating of 102 by the independent Timeform organisation, making her 25 pounds inferior to their top-rated juvenile filly Forest Flower. In the official Free Handicap for the year, she was allotted a weight of 112 pounds, nineteen pounds behind Forest Flower. In the following yer she received a Timeform rating of 126, seven pounds behind the top-rated three-year-old filly Miesque. In the official International Classification she was rated the second-best three-year-old filly in Europe in the 11 furlongs plus division, two pounds below Unite. In their annual Racehorses of 1987, Timeform described her as "thoroughly genuine, and one of the leading middle-distance fillies of her year".

== Breeding record ==
Bint Pasha was retired from racing to become a broodmare for her owner's Newgate Stud. In December 2002 she was consigned to the Tattersalls sale and was bought for 170,000 guineas by the bloodstock agent Hugh Lascelles. Bint Pasha died in 2006. She produced at least twelve foals and eight winners between 1990 and 2003:

- Revere, a bay colt, foaled in 1990, sired by Dancing Brave. Won seven races including Premio Citta di Napoli, Foundation Stakes, Gala Stakes.
- Nadra, bay filly, 1991, by Sadler's Wells. Failed to win in seven races.
- Monarch, bay colt, 1992, by Sadler's Wells. Won two races.
- Lanasara, chestnut filly, 1993, by Generous. Unraced.
- Ovation, chestnut filly, 1994, by Generous. Won one race.
- Lila, bay filly, 1996, by Zafonic. Won one race.
- Zafonium, chestnut colt, 1997, by Zafonic. Won one race.
- Saudia, dark bay or brown mare, 1998, by Gone West. Won one race.
- Live, bay filly, 1999, by Storm Cat. Raced in Japan, won one race.
- Safeen, chestnut filly, 2000, by Storm Cat. Unraced.
- Brahy, chestnut colt, 2001, by Rahy. Unplaced on only start.
- Ermine Sea, bay colt (later gelded), 2003, by Rainbow Quest. Won one race.

== Pedigree ==
Pedigree of Bint Pasha (USA), chestnut mare, 1984
Sire Affirmed (USA) 1975	Exclusive Native (USA); 1965	Raise a Native	Native Dancer
Sire Affirmed (USA) 1975	Exclusive Native (USA); 1965	Raise a Native	Raise You
Sire Affirmed (USA) 1975	Exclusive Native (USA); 1965	Exclusive	Shut Out
Sire Affirmed (USA) 1975	Exclusive Native (USA); 1965	Exclusive	Good Example
Sire Affirmed (USA) 1975	Won't Tell You (USA); 1962	Crafty Admiral	Fighting Fox
Sire Affirmed (USA) 1975	Won't Tell You (USA); 1962	Crafty Admiral	Admiral's Lady
Sire Affirmed (USA) 1975	Won't Tell You (USA); 1962	Careless Ribbon	Volcanic
Sire Affirmed (USA) 1975	Won't Tell You (USA); 1962	Careless Ribbon	Native Valor
Dam Icely Polite (USA) 1979	Graustark (USA); 1963	Ribot	Tenerani
Dam Icely Polite (USA) 1979	Graustark (USA); 1963	Ribot	Romanella
Dam Icely Polite (USA) 1979	Graustark (USA); 1963	Flower Bowl	Alibhai
Dam Icely Polite (USA) 1979	Graustark (USA); 1963	Flower Bowl	Flower Bed
Dam Icely Polite (USA) 1979	Royal Kin (USA); 1969	Sir Gaylord	Turn-To
Dam Icely Polite (USA) 1979	Royal Kin (USA); 1969	Sir Gaylord	Somethingroyal
Dam Icely Polite (USA) 1979	Royal Kin (USA); 1969	Myth	Olympia
Dam Icely Polite (USA) 1979	Royal Kin (USA); 1969	Myth	Kinfolks (Family: 16-c)
