= Premio Carlo Vittadini =

- Class: Group 3
- Location: San Siro Racecourse; Milan, Italy
- Race type: Flat / Thoroughbred
- Website: San Siro

Race information
- Distance: 1,600 metres (1 mile)
- Surface: Turf
- Track: Right-handed
- Qualification: Three-years-old and up
- Weight: 54 kg (3yo); 59½ kg (4yo+); Allowances; 1½ kg for fillies and mares Penalties; 2 kg for Group 1 winners * 1 kg for Group 2 winners * * since August 1 last year
- Purse: €121,000 (2015); 1st: €59,500

The Premio Carlo Vittadini is a Group 3 flat horse race in Italy open to thoroughbreds aged three years or older. It is run at Milan over a distance of 1,600 metres (about 1 mile), and it is scheduled to take place each year in late May or early June.

The event was formerly known as the Premio Emilio Turati. It was renamed in memory of Carlo Vittadini (1915–2007), a successful racehorse owner, in 2008.

The Premio Carlo Vittadini is currently held at the same meeting as the Oaks d'Italia. The race was downgraded from Group 2 to Group 3 in 2016.

== Records ==
Most successful horse since 1960 (2 wins):

- Chiese – 1965, 1966
- Misil – 1991, 1992
- Pressing – 2009, 2010
- Kaspersky - 2015, 2016
- Aria Importante - (2021, 2022)
- Arnis Master - (2023, 2024)

Leading jockey since 1986 (4 wins):

- Gianfranco Dettori – Svelt (1987), Jurado (1988), Misil (1991, 1992)
- Mirco Demuro – Stanott (1999), Marbye (2004), Nordhal (2005), Worthadd (2011)

Leading trainer since 1986 (5 wins):

- Alduino Botti – Svelt (1987), Jurado (1988), Ramonti (2006), Aria Importante (2021, 2022)

== Winners since 1986 ==
Year	Winner	Age	Jockey	Trainer	Time
1986	Efisio	4	Pat Eddery	John Dunlop	1:39.7
1987	Svelt	4	Gianfranco Dettori	Alduino Botti	1:37.4
1988	Jurado	5	Gianfranco Dettori	Alduino Botti	1:42.7
1989	Squill	4	Guy Guignard	Criquette Head	1:38.1
1990	Dordone	5	Vincenzo Mezzatesta	Mario Vincis	1:38.3
1991	Misil	3	Gianfranco Dettori	Vittorio Caruso	1:38.5
1992	Misil	4	Gianfranco Dettori	Vittorio Caruso	1:40.8
1993	Culture Vulture	4	Richard Quinn	Paul Cole	1:39.2
1994	Alflora	5	Michael Roberts	Clive Brittain	1:37.9
1995	Les Boyer	4	Edmondo Botti	Giuseppe Botti	1:42.1
1996	Morigi	5	Massimiliano Tellini	Ildo Tellini	1:38.8
1997	Gothenburg	4	Jason Weaver	Mark Johnston	1:41.8
1998	Waky Nao	5	Andrasch Starke	Andreas Schütz	1:38.7
1999	Stanott	4	Mirco Demuro	Luca Cumani	1:36.9
2000	Muhtathir	5	Frankie Dettori	Saeed bin Suroor	1:35.4
2001	Nicobar	4	Kevin Darley	Ian Balding	1:39.4
2002	Cornelius	5	Jimmy Fortune	Paul Cole	1:37.9
2003	Walzerkoenigin	4	Andreas Suborics	Peter Schiergen	1:38.3
2004	Marbye	4	Mirco Demuro	Bruno Grizzetti	1:40.1
2005	Nordhal	6	Mirco Demuro	Bruno Grizzetti	1:39.0
2006	Ramonti	4	Edmondo Botti	Alduino Botti	1:38.7
2007	Apollo Star	5	Andreas Suborics	Mario Hofer	1:41.7
2008	King Jock	7	Robert Burke	Robbie Osborne	1:40.9
2009	Pressing	6	Neil Callan	Michael Jarvis	1:36.6
2010	Pressing	7	Neil Callan	Michael Jarvis	1:36.5
2011	Worthadd	4	Mirco Demuro	Vittorio Caruso	1:36.8
2012	Vedelago	3	Mario Esposito	Luigi Polito	1:35.0
2013	Principe Adepto	5	Mario Esposito	Edmondo Botti	1:40.8
2014	Priore Philip	3	Cristian Demuro	Stefano Botti	1:35.1
2015	Kaspersky	4	Umberto Rispoli	Edmondo Botti	1:36.2
2016	Kasperksy	5	Umberto Rispoli	Edmondo Botti	1:41.9
2017	Circus Couture	5	Fabio Branca	Stefano Botti	1:36.8
2018	Poeta Diletto	5	Carlo Fiocchi	Alessandro Botti	1:36.8
2019	Anda Muchacho	5	Antonio Fresu	Nicolo Simondi	1:35.8
2020	Runnymede	4	Rene Piechulek	Sarah Steinberg	1:35.2
2021	Aria Importante	3	Mario Sanna	Alduino Botti	1:34.6
2022	Aria Importante	4	Dario Vargiu	Alduino Botti	1:35.1
2023	Arnis Master	4	Adrie de Vries	A. Kleinkorres	1:36.8
2024	Arnis Master	5	M. Cadeddu	M. Klug	1:39.9
2025	Interstellar	4	Alessio Satta	Endo Botti	1:35.6
2026	Kabir	4	Cristian Demuro	Endo Botti	1:36.4

== Earlier winners ==
- 1956: Barbara Sirani
- 1960: Malhoa
- 1961: Rio Marin
- 1962: Angri
- 1963: Rockstone
- 1964: Doney
- 1965: Chiese
- 1966: Chiese
- 1967: Prince Tady
- 1968: Ognon
- 1969: Montevideo
- 1970: Stefano di Cracovia
- 1971: Lascro
- 1972: Alcamo
- 1973: Brook
- 1974: Wayne
- 1975: Baly Rockette
- 1976: Shamsan
- 1977: Kronenkranich
- 1978: Capo Bon
- 1979: Fatusael
- 1980: Isopach
- 1981: Peloponnes
- 1982: Stifelius
- 1983: Bold Run
- 1984: Mount Bidder
- 1985: King of Clubs

== See also ==
- List of Italian flat horse races
