= Aston Park Stakes =

Flat horse race in Britain

Aston Park Stakes
2026
Kalpana	West Wind Blows	Arabian Force

Previous years
2025
Eydon	Tabletalk	El Cordobes
2024
Middle Earth	King Of Conquest	Cemhaan
2023
Haskoy	Israr	Bolshoi Ballet
2022
Ilaraab	Scope	Without A Fight
2021
Al Aasy	Thunderous	Logician

2020-2011
2019
Crystal Ocean	Laraaib	Raymond Tusk
2018
Crystal Ocean	Second Step	Scarlet Dragon
2017
Hawkbill	My Dream Boat	Midterm
2016
Astronereus	Ayrad	Carnachy
2015
Telescope	Dubday	Windshear
2014
Mount Athos	Forgotten Voice	First Mohican
2013
Willing Foe	Harris Tweed	Jehannedarc
2012
Hawaafez	Meganisi	Nehaam
2011
Drunken Sailor	Polly's Mark	Akmal

2010-2001
2010
Claremont	Sabotage	Petara Bay
2009
Tastahil	All The Aces	The Betchworth Kid
2008
Tranquil Tiger	Regal Flush	Spanish Hidalgo
2007
Peppertree Lane	Day Flight	Group Captain
2006
Distinction	Balkan Knight	Avalon
2005
Wolfe Tone	Gulf	High Accolade
2004
The Whistling Teal	Delsarte	Gulf
2003
Gamut	Fight Your Corner	Swing Wing
2002
High Pitched	Warrsan	Arctic Owl
2001
Water Jump	Sandmason	Sacred Song

2000-1991
2000
Sea Wave	Lightning Arrow	Zaajer
1999
Dark Shell	Kadaka	Raise A Prince
1998
Yorkshire	Ferny Hill	Bina Gardens
1997
Persian Punch	Further Flight	Sweetness Herself
1996
Election Day	Minds Music	Posidonas
1995
Escarpment	Sadler's Image	Linney Head
1994
Right Win	Persian Brave	Corrouge
1993
Brier Creek	Shuailaan	Linpac West
1992
Endoli	Mashaallah	Hebridean
1991
Snurge	Sardegna	Hateel

1990-1988
1990
Sesame	Rudjig	Landyap
1989
Albadr	Ibn Bey	Green Adventure
1988
Merce Cunningham	Shimshek	Ibn Bey

The Aston Park Stakes is a Group 3 flat horse race in Great Britain open to horses aged four years or older. It is run at Newbury over a distance of 1 mile and 4 furlongs (2,414 metres). Up until 2014 it was run over a distance of 1 mile 5 furlongs and 61 yards (2,671 metres), and it is scheduled to take place each year in May. The race was upgraded to Group 3 level from the 2016 running, having previously been a run as a Listed race. Since the 2016 running the race has been sponsored by Al Rayyan and run as the Al Rayyan Stakes.

== Winners ==
Year	Winner	Age	Jockey	Trainer	Time
1966	Zend Avesta	4	Lester Piggott	Bill Payne	2:57.20
1967	Black Prince	4	Taffy Thomas	Geoffrey Barling	3:06.40
1968	Chicago	4	Ron Hutchinson	Harry Wragg	2:52.40
1969	Rangong	4	Sandy Barclay	Noel Murless	2:57.80
1970	High Line	4	Joe Mercer	Derrick Candy	2:49.90
1971	Random Shot	4	Geoff Lewis	Arthur Budgett	2:53.59
1972	Selhurst	4	Geoff Lewis	Noel Murless	2:58.78
1973	Hakodate	4	Lester Piggott	Fulke Johnson Houghton	3:01.38
1974	Ragstone	4	Ron Hutchinson	John Dunlop	2:47.78
1975	Rouser	4	Geoff Lewis	Bruce Hobbs	2:57.92
1976	Major Green	5	Brian Taylor	John Winter	2:51.98
1977	Orange Bay	5	Pat Eddery	Peter Walwyn	3:05.65
1978	Paico	4	Pat Eddery	Peter Walwyn	2:56.68
1979	Vital Season	5	Pat Eddery	Herbert Blagrave	Not taken
1980	Balinger	4	Willie Carson	Dick Hern	2:48.34
1981	Derring Rose	6	John Reid	Fred Winter	3:08.77
1982	Easter Sun	5	Bruce Raymond	Michael Jarvis	2:52.02
1983	Ore	5	Lester Piggott	Willie Musson	3:09.09
1984	Jupiter Island	5	Lester Piggott	Clive Brittain	2:52.27
1985	Gold And Ivory	4	Steve Cauthen	Ian Balding	2:52.53
1986	Kaytu	5	Michael Roberts	Clive Brittain	3:03.12
1987	Orban	4	Steve Cauthen	Henry Cecil	2:47.44
1988	Merce Cunningham	4	Willie Carson	Neil Graham	2:47.35
1989	Albadr	4	Michael Roberts	Robert Armstrong	2:47.83
1990	Sesame	5	Walter Swinburn	David Morley	2:48.87
1991	Snurge	4	Richard Quinn	Paul Cole	2:54.15
1992	Endoli	5	Michael Roberts	Clive Brittain	2:45.15
1993	Brier Creek	4	Ray Cochrane	John Gosden	2:55.01
1994	Right Win	4	Pat Eddery	Richard Hannon Sr.	2:53.19
1995	Escarpment	4	John Reid	Peter Chapple-Hyam	2:47.26
1996	Election Day	4	Willie Carson	Michael Stoute	2:56.66
1997	Persian Punch	4	Ray Cochrane	David Elsworth	2:58.07
1998	Yorkshire	4	Richard Quinn	Paul Cole	2:48.52
1999	Dark Shell	4	Olivier Peslier	Michael Stoute	2:56.05
2000	Sea Wave	5	Frankie Dettori	Saeed bin Suroor	2:50.23
2001	Water Jump	4	Pat Eddery	John Dunlop	3:07.96
2002	High Pitched	4	Richard Quinn	Henry Cecil	2:50.68
2003	Gamut	4	Kieren Fallon	Sir Michael Stoute	2:48.64
2004	The Whistling Teal	8	Darryll Holland	Geoff Wragg	2:48.97
2005	Wolfe Tone	4	Kieren Fallon	Aidan O'Brien	2:48.96
2006	Distinction	7	Michael Kinane	Sir Michael Stoute	3:03.45
2007	Peppertree Lane	4	Kevin Darley	Mark Johnston	2:52.03
2008	Tranquil Tiger	4	Ted Durcan	Henry Cecil	2:52.31
2009	Tastahil	5	Richard Hills	Barry Hills	2:52.42
2010	Claremont	4	William Buick	Mahmood Al Zarooni	2:50.90
2011	Drunken Sailor	6	Kieren Fallon	Luca Cumani	2:47.91
2012	Hawaafez	4	K T O'Neill	Marcus Tregoning	2:58.44
2013	Willing Foe	6	Silvestre De Sousa	Saeed bin Suroor	2:50.15
2014	Mount Athos	7	Jamie Spencer	Marco Botti	2:48.72
2015	Telescope	5	Ryan Moore	Sir Michael Stoute	2:34.11
2016	Astronereus	5	Pat Dobbs	Amanda Perrett	2:38.41
2017	Hawkbill	4	William Buick	Charlie Appleby	2:42.75
2018	Crystal Ocean	4	Ryan Moore	Sir Michael Stoute	2:35.69
2019	Crystal Ocean	5	Ryan Moore	Sir Michael Stoute	2:33.78
	no race 2020 (Note: The 2020 running was cancelled because of the COVID-19 pandemic in the United Kingdom)
2021	Al Aasy	4	Jim Crowley	William Haggas	2:39.11
2022	Ilaraab	5	Tom Marquand	William Haggas	2:30.55
2023	Haskoy	4	Frankie Dettori	Ralph Beckett	2:32.33
2024	Middle Earth	4	Oisin Murphy	John & Thady Gosden	2:33.43
2025	Eydon	6	Oisin Murphy	Andrew Balding	2:31.27
2026	Kalpana	5	Colin Keane	Andrew Balding	2:28.71

== See also ==
- Horse racing in Great Britain
- List of British flat horse races
