= Fred Darling Stakes =

Flat horse race in Britain

Fred Darling Stakes (Dubai Duty Free Stakes)
- Class: Group 3
- Location: Newbury Racecourse; Newbury, England
- Inaugurated: 1949
- Race type: Flat / Thoroughbred
- Sponsor: Dubai Duty Free
- Website: Newbury

Race information
- Distance: 7f (1,408 metres)
- Surface: Turf
- Track: Straight
- Qualification: Three-year-old fillies
- Weight: 9 st 0 lb
- Purse: £83,615 (2025); 1st: £48,203

Fred Darling Stakes
2026
Sukanya	Touleen	Domina Ignis

Previous years
2025
Duty First	Hey Boo	Time For Sandals
2024
Folgaria	Regal Jubilee	Elmalka
2023
Remarquee	Stenton Glider	Swingalong
2022
Wild Beauty	Jumbly	Majestic Glory
2021
Alcohol Free	Statement	Vadream

2020-2011
2019
Dandhu	Iconic Choice	So Perfect
2018
Dan's Dream	Tajaanus	Dance Diva
2017
Dabyah	Urban Fox	Promising
2016
Marenko	Light Up Our World	Besharah
2015
Redstart	Jellicle Ball	Tiggy Wiggy
2014
J Wonder	Al Thakhira	Joyeuse
2013
Maureen	Agent Allison	Melbourne Memories
2012
Moonstone Magic	Radio Gaga	Electrelane
2011
Rimth	Sharnberry	Eucharist

2010-2001
2010
Puff	Habaayib	Lady Of The Desert
2009
Lahaleeb	Super Sleuth	Danehill Destiny
2008
Muthabara	Dream Day	Lady Deauville
2007
Majestic Roi	Indian Ink	Elusive Flash
2006
Nasheej	Cantabria	Short Dance
2005
Penkenna Princess	Royal Alchemist	Echelon
2004
Majestic Desert	Nyramba	Nataliya
2003
Tante Rose	Crystal Star	Rag Top
2002
Queen's Logic	Roundtree	Shiny
2001
Rolly Polly	Fatwa	Alshadiyah

2000-1991
2000
Iftiraas	Glen Rosie	Crimplene
1999
Wince	Golden Silca	Capistrano Day
1998
Daunting Lady	Wenda	Hoh Chi Min
1997
Dance Parade	Seebe	Well Warned
1996
Bosra Sham	Keepers Dawn	Sil Sila
1995
Aqaarid	Hoh Magic	Autumn Affair
1994
Bulaxie	Pen Point	Risky
1993
Sueboog	Ribbonwood	Secrage
1992
Musicale	Wiedniu	Central City
1991
Shadayid	Silver Braid	Chicarica

1990-1982
1990
Salsabil	Haunting Beauty	London Pride
1989
Pass The Peace	Russian Royal	Spring Sparkle
1988
Bluebook	Thaidah	Timely
1987
Littlefield	Blessed Event	Stay Low
1986
Maysoon	Asteroid Field	Tanouma
1985
Top Socialite	Al Bahathri	Merle
1984
Mahogany	Shoot Clear	Coulee Queen
1983
Goodbye Shelley	Nibabu	Habibti
1982
Slightly Dangerous	Zinzara	Ecstatica

The Fred Darling Stakes is a Group 3 flat horse race in Great Britain open to three-year-old fillies. It is run over a distance of 7 furlongs (1,408 metres) at Newbury in April.

== History ==
The event was established in 1949, and it was initially called the Lambourn Stakes. It was named after Lambourn, a nearby village associated with racehorse training.

For a period the race was contested over 7 furlongs and 60 yards. It continued with its original name until 1954, and was given its present title in 1955. It was renamed in memory of Fred Darling, a successful local trainer who died two years earlier.

The Dubai Duty Free company started to sponsor the Fred Darling Stakes in 1996. From this point the race was also known as the Dubai Duty Free Stakes. It used to be run on a left-handed course, but it was switched to a straight 7 furlongs in 1999.

The race can serve as a trial for various fillies' Classics in Europe. The last participant to win the 1,000 Guineas was Elmalka, the third-placed horse in 2024.

== Records ==
Leading jockey (4 wins):

- Lester Piggott – Sijui (1957), Royal Saint (1967), Durtal (1977), Millingdale Lillie (1980)
- Jimmy Lindley – Soldier's Song (1960), Anassa (1962), Night Appeal (1965), Highest Hopes (1970)
- Walter Swinburn – Marwell (1981), Top Socialite (1985), Maysoon (1986), Sueboog (1993)
- Willie Carson – Salsabil (1990), Shadayid (1991), Bulaxie (1994), Aqaarid (1995)

Leading trainer (6 wins):

- Noel Murless – Serocco (1950), Refreshed (1952), Sijui (1957), Royal Saint (1967), Sea Lavender (1969), Mysterious (1973)
- John Dunlop – Salsabil (1990), Shadayid (1991), Bulaxie (1994), Aqaarid (1995), Iftiraas (2000), Muthabara (2008)

== Winners ==
Year	Winner	Jockey	Trainer	Time
1949	Vale of Towy	Charlie Elliott	E Williams	1:32.00
1950	Serocco	Gordon Richards	Noel Murless	1:34.20
1951	Abandoned due to waterlogging
1952	Refreshed	Gordon Richards	Noel Murless	1:31.00
1953	Rose Coral	J Egan	Geoffrey Brooke	1:32.60
1954	Felise	Bill Rickaby	Jack Jarvis	1:33.20
1955	Feria	Scobie Breasley	Noel Cannon	1:32.00
1956	None Fairer	Bill Snaith	Harry Cottrill	1:37.40
1957	Sijui	Lester Piggott	Noel Murless	1:31.80
1958	Nicaria	Joe Mercer	Jack Colling	1:31.60
1959	Rosalba	Joe Mercer	Jack Colling	1:39.80
1960	Soldier's Song	Jimmy Lindley	Jeremy Tree	1:35.80
1961	Who Can Tell	Bobby Elliott	Dick Hern	1:37.80
1962	Anassa	Jimmy Lindley	Towser Gosden	1:30.20
1963	Gazpacho	Garnie Bougoure	Paddy Prendergast	1:35.60
1964	Ela Marita	Garnie Bougoure	Paddy Prendergast	1:34.40
1965	Night Appeal	Jimmy Lindley	Arthur Budgett	1:36.00
1966	Abandoned due to snow
1967	Royal Saint	Lester Piggott	Noel Murless	1:33.60
1968	Raymonda	Greville Starkey	John Oxley	1:33.80
1969	Sea Lavender	Sandy Barclay	Noel Murless	1:29.80
1970	Highest Hopes	Jimmy Lindley	Dick Hern	1:39.60
1971	Rotisserie	Tony Murray	Doug Smith	1:34.78
1972	Miss Paris	Eric Eldin	Doug Smith	1:58.90
1973	Mysterious	Geoff Lewis	Noel Murless	1:33.39
1974	Northern Gem	Eric Eldin	Doug Smith	1:32.19
1975	Carnauba	Georges Doleuze	L Turner	1:39.09
1976	Rowantree	Greville Starkey	Ian Balding	1:31.37
1977	Durtal	Lester Piggott	Barry Hills	1:32.42
1978	Shapina	Geoff Baxter	Paul Cole	1:39.30
1979	Topsy	Steve Cauthen	Harry Wragg	1:35.92
1980	Millingdale Lillie	Lester Piggott	Charlie Nelson	1:31.08
1981	Marwell	Walter Swinburn	Michael Stoute	1:32.87
1982	Slightly Dangerous	Steve Cauthen	Barry Hills	1:31.09
1983	Goodbye Shelley	John Lowe	Steve Norton	1:35.32
1984	Mahogany	Joe Mercer	Charlie Nelson	1:30.48
1985	Top Socialite	Walter Swinburn	Michael Stoute	1:33.17
1986	Maysoon	Walter Swinburn	Michael Stoute	1:39.16
1987	Littlefield	Tony Ives	Ian Balding	1:41.73
1988	Bluebook	Steve Cauthen	Henry Cecil	1:29.94
1989	Pass the Peace	Richard Quinn	Michael Bell	1:35.76
1990	Salsabil	Willie Carson	John Dunlop	1:31.63
1991	Shadayid	Willie Carson	John Dunlop	1:32.18
1992	Musicale	Pat Eddery	Henry Cecil	1:35.22
1993	Sueboog	Walter Swinburn	Clive Brittain	1:35.22
1994	Bulaxie	Willie Carson	John Dunlop	1:36.40
1995	Aqaarid	Willie Carson	John Dunlop	1:28.37
1996	Bosra Sham	Pat Eddery	Henry Cecil	1:33.46
1997	Dance Parade	Richard Quinn	Paul Cole	1:31.99
1998	Daunting Lady	Richard Hughes	Richard Hannon Sr.	1:36.95
1999	Wince	Kieren Fallon	Henry Cecil	1:24.20
2000	Iftiraas	Pat Eddery	John Dunlop	1:33.24
2001	Rolly Polly	Richard Quinn	Henry Cecil	1:31.00
2002	Queen's Logic	Steve Drowne	Mick Channon	1:24.74
2003	Tante Rose	Michael Hills	Barry Hills	1:23.92
2004	Majestic Desert	Kieren Fallon	Mick Channon	1:29.51
2005	Penkenna Princess	Seb Sanders	Ralph Beckett	1:30.32
2006	Nasheej	Ryan Moore	Richard Hannon Sr.	1:24.61
2007	Majestic Roi	Jamie Spencer	Mick Channon	1:23.67
2008	Muthabara	Richard Hills	John Dunlop	1:28.67
2009	Lahaleeb	Darryll Holland	Mick Channon	1:27.87
2010	Puff	Jim Crowley	Ralph Beckett	1:23.80
2011	Rimth	Christophe Soumillon	Paul Cole	1:25.34
2012	Moonstone Magic	Jim Crowley	Ralph Beckett	1:31.56
2013	Maureen	Richard Hughes	Richard Hannon Sr.	1:25.45
2014	J Wonder	Jimmy Fortune	Brian Meehan	1:28.83
2015	Redstart	Pat Dobbs	Ralph Beckett	1:22.13
2016 (Note: The 2016 running took place at Chelmsford City)	Marenko	Ryan Moore	Richard Hannon Jr.	1:25.64
2017	Dabyah	Frankie Dettori	John Gosden	1:24.54
2018	Dan's Dream	Silvestre de Sousa	Mick Channon	1:27.09
2019	Dandhu	Gerald Mosse	David Elsworth	1:28.88
	no race 2020 (Note: The 2020 running was cancelled because of the COVID-19 pandemic in the United Kingdom)
2021	Alcohol Free	Oisin Murphy	Andrew Balding	1:24.44
2022	Wild Beauty	William Buick	Charlie Appleby	1:24.93
2023	Remarquee	Rob Hornby	Ralph Beckett	1:31.13
2024	Folgaria	Hollie Doyle	Marco Botti	1:26.35
2025	Duty First	Hollie Doyle	Archie Watson	1:23.95
2026	Sukanya	David Probert	Jack Channon	1:24.82

== See also ==
- Horse racing in Great Britain
- List of British flat horse races
- Recurring sporting events established in 1949 – this race is included under its original title, Lambourn Stakes.
