= Snurge =

Irish-bred Thoroughbred racehorse

- Sire: Ela-Mana-Mou
- Grandsire: Pitcairn
- Dam: Finlandia
- Damsire: Faraway Son
- Sex: Stallion
- Foaled: 12 March 1987
- Country: Ireland
- Colour: Chestnut
- Breeder: Kilcarn Stud
- Owner: Martyn Arbib
- Trainer: Paul Cole
- Record: 34: 7-10-5
- Earnings: £1,281,535 (approximate)

Major wins
- Critérium de Saint-Cloud (1989) disqualified St. Leger Stakes (1990); Aston Park Stakes (1991); Gran Premio di Milano (1991); Grand Prix de Deauville (1991, 1993); Premio Roma Vecchia (1991); Canadian International Stakes (1992)

Snurge (12 March 1987 – November 2006), was an Irish-bred British-trained Thoroughbred racehorse and sire. In a career which lasted from September 1989 until September 1994, he ran thirty-four times and won seven races. He recorded his most important success when winning the Classic St. Leger Stakes as a three-year-old maiden in 1990. In the following seasons he won major races in France, Italy and Canada, before retiring as a seven-year-old. At the time of his retirement he held the record for prize money won by a European-trained horse, although the precise total of his earnings was difficult to determine because of the number of different currencies involved.

== Background ==
Snurge was a chestnut horse with a narrow white blaze bred at the Kilcarn Stud near Navan in County Meath, Ireland. Before his racing career began he entered the ownership of the British businessman Martyn Arbib, who named the colt after a nickname he received while in school. Snurge was sired by the King George VI and Queen Elizabeth Stakes winner Ela-Mana-Mou out of the French-bred mare Finlandia. The horse was trained by Paul Cole at Whatcombe, near Wantage in Oxfordshire and ridden in all but two of his races by Richard Quinn.

== Racing career ==
=== 1989: two-year-old season ===
Snurge made his first appearance in the Haynes, Hanson and Clark Conditions Stakes over one mile at Newbury Racecourse on 22 September and finished third of the nine runners behind Tanfith. A month later he ran in a ten furlong maiden race at Nottingham. He took the lead briefly before finishing second to Blue Stag, a horse who went on to be the runner-up in the 1990 Epsom Derby. In November, Snurge was sent to France and moved up in class to contest the Group One Critérium de Saint-Cloud. He finished first by three lengths from Intimiste, but was "controversially" disqualified and placed second by the racecourse stewards.

=== 1990: three-year-old season ===
Snurge missed the early part of the 1990 season before reappearing at the Ascot Heath meeting after Royal Ascot in which he contested the Churchill Stakes, finishing second by a head to Middle Kingdom. After a break of two months, Snurge returned to the racecourse in the Great Voltigeur Stakes at York. He started the 22/1 outsider of the five horse field, which was headed by the King George VI and Queen Elizabeth Stakes winner Belmez. Snurge took the lead in the straight and stayed on strongly before being caught in the last strides and beaten a head by Belmez.

On 15 September at Doncaster, Snurge started second favourite for the St Leger at odds of 7/2, with the filly Hellenic, the winner of the Ribblesdale Stakes and the Yorkshire Oaks starting favourite at 2/1. The two leading horses in the betting dominated the closing stages of the race with Snurge taking the lead from Hellenic in the straight and running on strongly to beat the filly by three quarters of a length. He was recording his first ever win, becoming the first maiden to win the St Leger for seventy-seven years. In October, Snurge contested the Prix de l'Arc de Triomphe at Longchamp, the most prestigious race of the European flat-racing season. In a finish dominated by three-year-old colts he finished third, beaten three quarters of a length and half a length by Saumarez and Epervier Bleu.

=== 1991: four-year-old season ===
Snurge began his four-year-old season by winning the Listed Aston Park Stakes at Newbury and was then sent to Italy where he won the Group One Gran Premio di Milano. After a mid-summer break, Snurge started favourite for the Grand Prix de Deauville and won by a neck.

Snurge's three victories led to his being considered a serious contender for the 1991 Prix de l'Arc de Triomphe and he started the 8/1 fourth favourite behind the three-year-olds Generous, Suave Dancer and Pistolet Bleu. He failed to produce his best form and finished last of the fourteen runners. Later in October, Snurge was sent to Italy where he finished third in the Gran Premio del Jockey Club in Milan before winning the Premio Roma Vecchia in Rome.

=== 1992: five-year-old season ===
Snurge began his five-year-old season by finishing third in Yorkshire Cup before running unplaced in the Coronation Cup and the Gran Premio di Milano. He then ran second in four successive races, finishing runner-up in the Grosser Preis von Berlin, the Aral-Pokal, the Grand Prix de Deauville and the Irish St. Leger. He was then sent to Canada to contest the Canadian International Stakes at Woodbine Racetrack on 18 October. Snurge finished second by half a length to the French-trained colt Wiorno, but was awarded the race on a disqualification, after the racecourse stewards' found that Wiorno had repeatedly bumped the third place Ghazi in an "incredibly tight finish". The beaten horses included Urban Sea and Mashaallah. The disqualification was appealed but Snurge's victory was confirmed by the Ontario Racing Commission in November. On his final appearance of the season he returned to Europe and finished unplaced in the Premio Roma Vecchia.

=== 1993–1994: later career ===
Snurge ran six times as a six-year-old in 1993. His progress was hindered by a viral infection in the early part of the season. His only success came in August when he defeated Petit Loup by a short head to win the Grand Prix de Deauville for a second time. He finished sixth behind Vintage Crop when favourite for the Irish St. Leger three weeks later.

In 1994, Snurge continued to compete in major middle-distance races but failed to win. His best performances came when he finished second in the Gran Premio di Milano and the Prix Maurice de Nieuil and third in the Aral-Pokal. He was injured when finishing last of the six runners in the Cumberland Lodge Stakes at Ascot in September and was retired to stud.

== Stud career ==
Snurge stood as a stallion in France at the Haras du Val Henry and before being moved to Ireland. He was based at the Arctic Tack Stud in County Wexford and then the Grange Stud in County Cork where he represented the Coolmore Stud as a National Hunt stallion. Snurge sired the winners of more than 300 National Hunt races, but none at the highest level. He died of colic at the age of nineteen in November 2006.

== Pedigree ==
Pedigree of Snurge (IRE), chestnut stallion, 1987
Sire Ela-Mana-Mou (IRE) 1976	Pitcairn (IRE); 1971	Petingo	Petition
Sire Ela-Mana-Mou (IRE) 1976	Pitcairn (IRE); 1971	Petingo	Alcazar
Sire Ela-Mana-Mou (IRE) 1976	Pitcairn (IRE); 1971	Border Bounty	Bounteous
Sire Ela-Mana-Mou (IRE) 1976	Pitcairn (IRE); 1971	Border Bounty	B Flat
Sire Ela-Mana-Mou (IRE) 1976	Rose Bertin (GB); 1970	High Hat	Hyperion
Sire Ela-Mana-Mou (IRE) 1976	Rose Bertin (GB); 1970	High Hat	Madonna
Sire Ela-Mana-Mou (IRE) 1976	Rose Bertin (GB); 1970	Wide Awake	Major Portion
Sire Ela-Mana-Mou (IRE) 1976	Rose Bertin (GB); 1970	Wide Awake	Wake Island
Dam Finlandia (FR) 1977	Faraway Son (USA); 1967	Ambiopoise	Ambiorix
Dam Finlandia (FR) 1977	Faraway Son (USA); 1967	Ambiopoise	Bull Poise
Dam Finlandia (FR) 1977	Faraway Son (USA); 1967	Locust Time	Spy Song
Dam Finlandia (FR) 1977	Faraway Son (USA); 1967	Locust Time	Snow Goose
Dam Finlandia (FR) 1977	Musical (GB); 1961	Prince Chevalier	Prince Rose
Dam Finlandia (FR) 1977	Musical (GB); 1961	Prince Chevalier	Chevalerie
Dam Finlandia (FR) 1977	Musical (GB); 1961	Musidora	Nasrullah
Dam Finlandia (FR) 1977	Musical (GB); 1961	Musidora	Painted Vale (Family:1-m)
