= Geoffrey Freer Stakes =

Flat horse race in Britain

- Class: Group 3
- Location: Newbury Racecourse; Newbury, England
- Inaugurated: 1949
- Race type: Flat
- Sponsor: Highclere Thoroughbred Racing
- Website: Newbury

Race information
- Distance: 1m 5f 61y (2,671 m)
- Surface: Turf
- Track: Left-handed
- Qualification: Three-years-old and up
- Weight: 8 st 12 lb (3yo); 9 st 7 lb (4yo+); Allowances; 3 lb for fillies and mares Penalties; 7 lb for Group 1 winners * 5 lb for Group 2 winners * 3 lb for Group 3 winners * *after 2024
- Purse: £90,000 (2025); 1st: £51,309

Geoffrey Freer Stakes
2026
Wine Dark Sea	Tabletalk	Dubai Honour

Previous years
2025
Furthur	Epic Poet	Candleford
2024
Al Aasy	Al Qareem	Go Daddy
2023
Arrest	Ching Shih	Shandoz
2022
Zechariah	Universal Order	Outbox
2021
Hukum	Rodrigo Diaz	Pablo Escobarr

2020-2011
2020
Hukum	Max Vega	Alignak
2019
Technician	Morando	Durston
2018
Hamada	Raymond Tusk	Walton Street
2017
Defoe	Wall of Fire	Frontiersman
2016
Kings Fete	Ormito	Red Cardinal
2015
Agent Murphy	Windshear	Red Cadeaux
2014
Seismos	Willing Foe	Seal Of Approval
2013
Royal Empire	Red Cadeaux	Lost In The Moment
2012
Mount Athos	Brown Panther	Modun
2011
Census	Brown Panther	Times Up

2010-2001
2010
Sans Frontieres	Laaheb	Saptapadi
2009
Kite Wood	Halicarnassus	Age Of Reason
2008
Sixties Icon	Tempelstern	Donegal
2007
Papal Bull	Shahin	Land 'n Stars
2006
Admiral's Cruise	Guadalajara	Munsef
2005
Lochbuie	Mubtaker	Self Defense
2004
Mubtaker	Dubai Success	Compton Bolter
2003
Mubtaker	Systematic	Mamool
2002
Mubtaker	High Pitched	Persian Punch
2001
Mr Combustible	Millenary	Kuwait Trooper

2000-1991
2000
Murghem	Savoire Vivre	Yorkshire
1999
Silver Patriarch	Craigsteel	Sadian
1998
Multicoloured	Silver Patriarch	Memorise
1997
Dushyantor	Panama City	Shantou
1996
Phantom Gold	Posidonas	Song Of Tara
1995
Presenting	Midnight Legend	Don Corleone
1994
Red Route	Shareek	Shambo
1993
Azzilfi	Assessor	Sonus
1992
Shambo	Sapience	Rock Hopper
1991
Drum Taps	Spinning	Another Bob

1990-1988
1990
Charmer	Sesame	Mountain Kingdom
1989
Ibn Bey	Apache	Alphabel
1988
Top Class	Melodist	Waterfield

The Geoffrey Freer Stakes is a Group 3 flat horse race in Great Britain open to horses aged three years or older. It is run at Newbury over a distance of 1 mile, 5 furlongs and 61 yards (2,671 metres), and it is scheduled to take place each year in August.

== History ==
The event was established in 1949, and it was originally called the Oxfordshire Stakes. It was founded by Geoffrey Freer, a Jockey Club handicapper who served as the manager of Newbury Racecourse. The venue had been used as an American military supply depot during World War II, and Freer restored the course in the post-war period. The race was renamed in his honour in 1969, the year after his death.

For a period the Geoffrey Freer Stakes was classed at Group 2 level. It was relegated to its current status, Group 3, in 2006.

The leading three-year-olds from the race sometimes go on to compete in the following month's St. Leger Stakes.

== Records ==
Most successful horse (3 wins):

- Mubtaker – 2002, 2003, 2004

Leading jockey (5 wins):

- Frankie Dettori – Charmer (1990), Drum Taps (1991), Phantom Gold (1996), Kite Wood (2009), Arrest (2023)

Leading trainer (5 wins):

- Noel Murless – Ridge Wood (1949), Court Command (1956), Hopeful Venture (1967), Rangong (1969), Attica Meli (1973)

== Winners ==
Year	Winner	Age	Jockey	Trainer	Time
1949	Ridge Wood	3	Gordon Richards	Noel Murless	2:53.40
1950	Tilloy	3	Edgar Britt	Sam Armstrong	2:57.00
1951	Le Sage	3	Gordon Richards	Tommy Carey	3:18.20
1952	Westinform	3	Tommy Gosling	Ron Smyth	2:59.40
1953	Harwin	3	Harry Carr	Joseph Dines	2:53.40
1954	Umberto	3	Ken Gethin	Peter Thrale	3:04.40
1955	True Cavalier	3	Eph Smith	Harvey Leader	2:49.60
1956	Court Command	3	Lester Piggott	Noel Murless	2:59.00
1957	Court Harwell	3	Scobie Breasley	Sir Gordon Richards	2:57.80
1958	Owen Glendower	3	Geoff Lewis	Peter Hastings-Bass	3:20.20
1959	Kalydon	3	Eph Smith	Bernard van Cutsem	2:55.00
1960	High Hat	3	Harry Carr	Walter Nightingall	2:59.20
1961	Sagacity	3	Eph Smith	Cecil Boyd-Rochfort	2:52.40
1962	Sovrango	4	Bill Williamson	Harry Wragg	2:57.60
1963	Sovrango	5	Bill Williamson	Harry Wragg	3:04.00
1964	Sunseeker	3	Jack Purtell	Vincent O'Brien	2:54.40
1965	Court Gift	3	Stan Clayton	Bruce Hobbs	2:54.00
1966	Charlottown	3	Jimmy Lindley	Gordon Smyth	2:58.40
1967	Hopeful Venture	3	George Moore	Noel Murless	2:56.00
1968	Levmoss	3	Brian Taylor	Seamus McGrath	3:02.20
1969	Rangong	4	Sandy Barclay	Noel Murless	2:56.80
1970	High Line	4	Joe Mercer	Derrick Candy	2:48.12
1971	High Line	5	Jimmy Lindley	Derrick Candy	2:55.53
1972	Sol'Argent	5	Jimmy Lindley	Tommy Gosling	2:55.49
1973	Attica Meli	4	Geoff Lewis	Noel Murless	2:53.07
1974	Realistic	5	Pat Eddery	Herbert Blagrave	3:07.34
1975	Consul	3	Pat Eddery	Peter Walwyn	2:52.00
1976	Swell Fellow	5	Tony Kimberley	Jeremy Hindley	2:53.21
1977	Valinsky	3	Lester Piggott	Vincent O'Brien	2:50.11
1978	Ile de Bourbon	3	John Reid	Fulke Johnson Houghton	2:57.50
1979	Niniski	3	Willie Carson	Dick Hern	2:53.35
1980	Nicholas Bill	5	Philip Waldron	Henry Candy	3:01.56
1981	Ardross	5	Lester Piggott	Henry Cecil	3:04.71
1982	Ardross	6	Lester Piggott	Henry Cecil	2:54.24
1983	Khairpour	4	John Reid	Fulke Johnson Houghton	2:52.58
1984	Baynoun	3	Steve Cauthen	Fulke Johnson Houghton	2:55.68
1985	Shernazar	4	Walter Swinburn	Michael Stoute	2:57.01
1986	Bakharoff	3	Willie Carson	Guy Harwood	2:50.82
1987	Moon Madness	4	Pat Eddery	John Dunlop	2:47.16
1988	Top Class	3	Michael Roberts	Clive Brittain	2:54.57
1989	Ibn Bey	5	Richard Quinn	Paul Cole	2:50.62
1990	Charmer	5	Frankie Dettori	Clive Brittain	2:55.24
1991	Drum Taps	5	Frankie Dettori	Lord Huntingdon	2:45.16
1992	Shambo	5	Michael Roberts	Clive Brittain	3:01.98
1993	Azzilfi	3	Willie Carson	John Dunlop	2:56.75
1994	Red Route	3	Willie Ryan	Henry Cecil	2:50.38
1995	Presenting	3	John Reid	John Gosden	2:47.43
1996	Phantom Gold	4	Frankie Dettori	Lord Huntingdon	2:46.18
1997	Dushyantor	4	Kieren Fallon	Henry Cecil	2:55.33
1998	Multicoloured	5	Willie Ryan	Sir Michael Stoute	2:49.61
1999	Silver Patriarch	5	Pat Eddery	John Dunlop	2:50.62
2000	Murghem	5	Darryll Holland	Mark Johnston	2:50.24
2001	Mr Combustible	3	Michael Hills	Barry Hills	2:46.36
2002	Mubtaker	5	Richard Hills	Marcus Tregoning	2:45.46
2003	Mubtaker	6	Richard Hills	Marcus Tregoning	2:47.76
2004	Mubtaker	7	Richard Hills	Marcus Tregoning	2:50.69
2005	Lochbuie	4	John Egan	Geoff Wragg	2:51.97
2006	Admiral's Cruise	4	Ryan Moore	Brian Meehan	2:52.42
2007	Papal Bull	4	Ryan Moore	Sir Michael Stoute	2:53.89
2008	Sixties Icon	5	Johnny Murtagh	Jeremy Noseda	2:51.55
2009	Kite Wood	3	Frankie Dettori	Saeed bin Suroor	2:48.87
2010	Sans Frontieres	4	Johnny Murtagh	Jeremy Noseda	2:52.22
2011	Census	3	Richard Hughes	Richard Hannon Sr.	2:48.46
2012	Mount Athos	5	Ryan Moore	Luca Cumani	2:49.20
2013	Royal Empire	4	Kieren Fallon	Saeed bin Suroor	2:50.43
2014	Seismos	6	Martin Harley	Marco Botti	2:54.77
2015	Agent Murphy	4	Jimmy Fortune	Brian Meehan	2:54.39
2016	Kings Fete	5	Pat Smullen	Sir Michael Stoute	2:52.97
2017	Defoe	3	Andrea Atzeni	Roger Varian	2:51.50
2018	Hamada	4	James Doyle	Charlie Appleby	2:51.63
2019	Technician	3	Rob Hornby	Martyn Meade	2:55.70
2020	Hukum	3	Jim Crowley	Owen Burrows	2:53.42
2021	Hukum	4	Jim Crowley	Owen Burrows	2:55.14
2022	Zechariah	3	Tom Marquand	Freddie & Martyn Meade	2:46.99
2023	Arrest	3	Frankie Dettori	John & Thady Gosden	2:53.79
2024	Al Aasy	7	Jim Crowley	William Haggas	2:46.34
2025	Furthur	3	Oisin Murphy	Andrew Balding	2:51.96
2026	Wine Dark Sea	4	Hector Crouch	Harry Charlton	2:47.81

== See also ==
- Horse racing in Great Britain
- List of British flat horse races
- Recurring sporting events established in 1949 – this race is included under its original title, Oxfordshire Stakes.
