= Urs Schwarzenbach =

Swiss businessman and financier (born 1948)

Urs Schwarzenbach CStJ
- Born: Urs Ernst Schwarzenbach; 17 September 1948 (age 77); Thalwil, Switzerland
- Occupations: Businessman; trader; financier; art collector
- Spouse: Francesca Mulhall
- Children: 2
- Relatives: Clifton Wrottesley, 6th Baron Wrottesley (son-in-law)

Urs Ernst Schwarzenbach, CStJ (born 17 September 1948) is a Swiss billionaire, financier and art collector. He is the founder of Interexchange, the largest foreign exchange agency, in Switzerland. His fortune is estimated between 1.5 and 2 billion Swiss francs as of 2022 by Handelszeitung.

Schwarzenbach was a long-time resident of Aston, Berkshire, where he owned Culham Court. He moved back to Switzerland, where he currently resides in Küsnacht on Lake Zurich.

Most recently he was sentenced by Swiss courts for importing 83 art pieces without customs clearance into Switzerland. He was fined 6 million Swiss francs. In 2022, he was ordered by the Federal Supreme Court of Switzerland to pay 160 million Swiss francs in back taxes.

== Early life and education ==
Schwarzenbach was born 17 September 1948 in Thalwil at Lake Zurich, to Heinrich Ernst Schwarzenbach (1916–2013), a print shop owner, who was known by his second first name Ernst. He had a modest upbringing in a working class family. He is very distantly related to the silk manufacturing branch of the Schwarzenbach family.

== Career ==
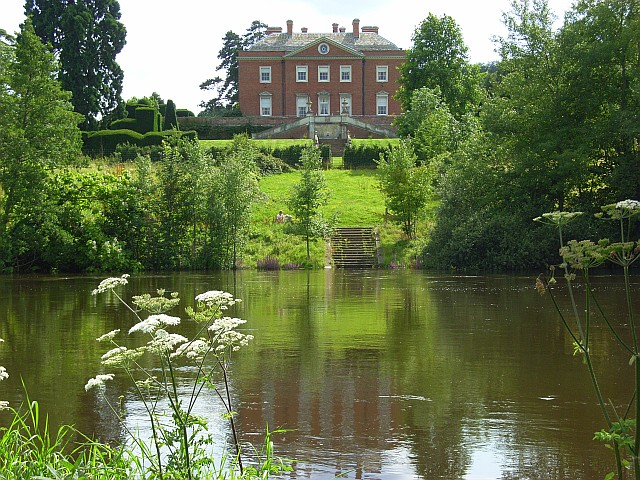
Culham Court, 2007

Schwarzenbach set up Interexchange, the largest foreign exchange dealership in Switzerland. Through its success, he has bought well over £300m of property in the UK, 123,000 acres (500 km^{2}) in Australia, a palace in Morocco, £17m of assets in the aviation field and the Grand Hotel Dolder in Zurich. He has his own polo team, the Black Bears, which has some 600 ponies, with 350 in Australia and 250 in the UK.

He backed the racing-themed restaurant Café Grand Prix in Mayfair, London, but this went into liquidation in 2004. In 2005, Schwarzenbach was estimated to be worth around £900m but, according to The Sunday Times Rich List 2012, he was ranked 87th with an estimated worth of circa £850m.

In 2007, Schwarzenbach outbid other foreign buyers to acquire Culham Court, a 650-acre (2.6 km^{2}) riverside estate downstream of Henley-on-Thames on the Berkshire bank. Schwarzenbach bought the estate from Paddy and Annabel Nicoll for £35 million. Mrs Nicoll's father is Sir Martyn Arbib, former head of the Perpetual fund management company, who bought the estate as a wedding present for her in 1997 for £12 million. Coincidentally, Culham's connections with the world of finance run deeper still; Arbib acquired the property from Felicity Behrens, wife of the banker Michael Behrens, who lived there for nearly half a century from 1949 to 1996.

Schwarzenbach's development of the Culham Court estate still continues with the extension of the existing 90-acre (36 ha) deer park with over 4 kilometres of wrought iron deer fencing, a mile long "London" drive through beech woodland to the main road, the 2010 £8 million acquisition of three cottages and the original walled gardens which will be reinstated to provide fresh fruit and vegetables for the main house, a new ha-ha, and a security system including a "hard" room.

The latest creation is a maze requiring the planting of 20,000 mature yew bushes; this part of the 20-year plan that has been devised for the gardens and grounds. Another property acquired for £2m in 2010, and situated on raised ground that overlooks Culham Court, has been demolished and Culham Chapel was built in its place. Symm, the Oxford-based building company undertaking all the work on the Culham estate, now sponsors the Hambleden Horse Trials.

In 2008, it was reported in the press that Schwarzenbach had bought nearby Fawley Court for £22 million. Another substantial riverside property on the outskirts of Henley-on-Thames and once owned in the nineteenth century by a Scottish banker, it was sold in controversial circumstances by the Congregation of Marian Fathers, a Polish religious community which had no further use for it. During 2012, extensive building works continue on the main house yet again with Symms continuing to be the main beneficiary of the contract and work at the two lodges adjacent to the A4130 at the main entrance to the "London drive" are being completed after well over a year and some interesting underground developments. In 2012 the Schwarzenbachs revoked their consent for the permissive footpath that had run alongside the Thames in front of Culham Court as part of the Thames Path for many years.

Schwarzenbach has paid for the high and low voltage overhead electricity network within the boundaries of Culham estate to be placed underground.

== VAT fraud and art trafficking with Galerie Gmurzynska ==
In 2013/14, Schwarzenbach was investigated by the FCA (Federal Customs Administration) for alleged VAT fraud totalling some ten million Swiss francs and art trafficking. Under Swiss law, owners of artworks do not have to pay import charges until works of art are formally brought into the country, i.e. they come out of storage and are officially transferred. On Tuesday 16 April 2013, Schwarzenbach's Hotel Dolder in Zurich, which had been displaying a lavish art collection, was raided by Swiss customs officials. This action was simultaneous with a raid on nearby Galerie Gmurzynska on the suspicion of supplying the five-star Hotel Dolder with imported artworks valuing 75M Swiss francs without paying duty.

The Swiss authorities seized a large number of documents during their raid. Gmurzynska filed a complaint to prevent their inspection, but the Federal Court has ruled that in a criminal investigation of this kind where there is reasonable suspicion, the prosecuting FCA can demand to see papers it considers relevant to the case.

The case has been covered in several international outlets including 'Die Welt'.

In October 2016 the Swiss Customs Directorate finalised a compelling case that Schwarzenbach in effect had legally exported artefacts for a value of at least 130 million CHF and smuggled them back into Switzerland. Schwarzenbach eventually admitted the charge and also accepted to pay the VAT amounting to ten million CHF. However, by October 2016 he was still objecting to pay the fine of 4 million Swiss francs.

== Real estate holdings ==
The Dolder Grand Hotel, Zurich

=== Switzerland ===
Schwarzenbach owns the Dolder Grand, a 5-star Zurich hotel, which cost him SFr 440 million in 2001. In 2017, Swiss customs officials entered the hotel and seized around 30 paintings, worth approximately $50 million, in a dispute over Schwarzenbach's back taxes and VAT evasion.

=== Australia ===
Schwarzenbach owns about 50,000 hectares of farmland in New South Wales, Australia, through his Romani Pastoral Company. Most of this is between Harden and Jugiong, and includes the polo estate Garangula, as well as Redbank, a house once owned by the impresario Robert Stigwood.

=== Morocco ===
He bought part of Palais Layadi, a 19th-century palace set in a 4,000 square meter compound in Marrakesh, since at least 2008. The main parts of Palais Layadi (Palais Soleiman) which include the reception area still belong to the moroccan Segueni's family.

== Philanthropy ==
Schwarzenbach has supported the internal and external refurbishment of the Venerable English College in Rome, as well as its engagement of a research fellow and project archivist.

== Personal life ==
Schwarzenbach is married to Francesca Schwarzenbach (née Mulhall), a former Miss Australia, born in Sydney. She is a godmother of Lady Louise Windsor, the daughter of Prince Edward, Duke of Edinburgh. They have two children:

- Guy Vivian Ernst Schwarzenbach (born March 1982)
- Sascha Schwarzenbach, who is married to Irish Olympian Clifton Wrottesley, 6th Baron Wrottesley. They live in St Moritz, Switzerland, and London, England, and have four children.

Schwarzenbach was a long-time resident Culham Court near Henley-on-Thames and sponsored the rowing gallery of the River and Rowing Museum in Henley which is named after him. He owns other estates and farms in England, a 10,000 acre sporting estate in Scotland and the largest country estate on the Isle of Wight. In 2017, he permanently relocated back to Küsnacht, Switzerland.
