= Culham Court, Berkshire =

House in Berkshire, England

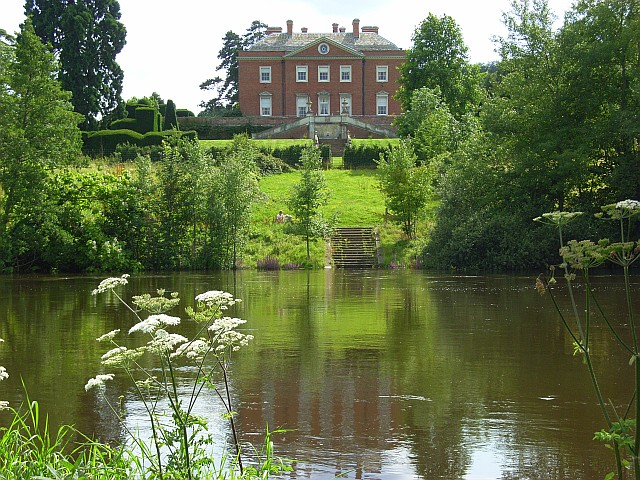
- View from the Thames

- Location of Culham Court in Berkshire
- 51°32′51″N 0°51′47″W
- Type: Country house
- Location: Remenham
- OS grid reference: SU 78929 83800

History
- Built: 1771

Site notes
- Area: Berkshire
- Architect: Sir William Chambers
- Owner: Private

Listed Building – Grade II*
- Official name: Culham Court
- Designated: 1 Aug 1952
- Reference no.: 1118167

Culham Court is a Grade II* listed house and estate beside the River Thames at Remenham in the English county of Berkshire.

== History ==
The estate on which Culham Court stands was held by the Bishop of Winchester during the medieval period. It later became the property of the Barons Lovelace, but was sold by John Lovelace to Richard Stevens. His son, Henry Stevens, built a house on the site in 1706. In the late 1760s, the original house was bought by London lawyer, Richard Michell, whose personal fortune was based on his marriage to an Antiguan sugar heiress, but it burnt down whilst being repaired. The current house was built in 1771 by the architect Sir William Chambers, for Robert Mitchell.

In 1893, the house was tenanted by Sir Henry Barber, 1st Baronet and his wife. He died in 1927 and she in 1933. Later owners included the newspaper owner Cecil Harmsworth King.

In 1949, the house was bought by the financier Michael Behrens, later co-owner of Ionian Bank, and his wife Felicity. Their artist son Timothy Behrens grew up there, and would entertain friends including Hugh Casson and Edward Ardizzone. Behrens died in 1989, but Felicity lived there until 1996. In 1997, the house was bought by Sir Martyn Arbib for his daughter, Annabel (married to businessman Paddy Nicoll). Arbib bought it for £12 million, and in 2006, they sold it to Swiss-born British billionaire Urs Schwarzenbach for £35 million, £10 million above the asking price.

The Christ the Redeemer Chapel at Culham Court, designed by Craig Hamilton Architects and completed in 2010, was consecrated with a performance of James MacMillan’s The Culham Motets (2015).
