= Pretty Polly Stakes =

Horse race in Ireland

- Class: Group 1
- Location: Curragh Racecourse; County Kildare, Ireland
- Race type: Flat / Thoroughbred
- Sponsor: Paddy Power
- Website: Curragh

Race information
- Distance: 1m 2f (2,012 metres)
- Surface: Turf
- Track: Right-handed
- Qualification: Three-years-old and up fillies & mares
- Weight: 8 st 12 lb (3yo); 9 st 8lb (4yo+)
- Purse: €300,000 (2022); 1st: €180,000

Pretty Polly Stakes
2026
Estrange	One Look	Red Letter

Previous years
2025
Whirl	Kalpana	Survie
2024
Bluestocking	Emily Upjohn	Content
2023
Via Sistina	Stay Alert	Above The Curve
2022
La Petite Coco	My Astra	Thunder Kiss
2021
Thundering Nights	Santa Barbara	Cayenne Pepper

2020-2011
2020
Magical	Cayenne Pepper	Fleeting
2019
Iridessa	Magic Wand	Pink Dogwood
2018
Urban Fox	Forever Together	Athena
2017
Nezwaah	Rain Goddess	Turret Rocks
2016
Minding	Bocca Baciata	Lucida
2015
Diamondsandrubies	Legatissimo	Ribbons
2014
Thistle Bird	Venus de Milo	Just The Judge
2013
Ambivalent	Was	Shirocco Star
2012
Izzi Top	Sapphire	I'm A Dreamer
2011
Misty For Me	Midday	Chrysanthemum

2010-2001
2010
Chinese White	Flying Cloud	Akdarena
2009
Dar Re Mi	Beach Bunny	Look Here
2008
Promising Lead	Mad About You	Anna Pavlova
2007
Peeping Fawn	Speciosa	West Wind
2006
Alexander Goldrun	Chelsea Rose	Red Bloom
2005
Alexander Goldrun	Red Bloom	Elopa
2004
Chorist	Alexander Goldrun	Ivowen
2003
Hanami	Snippets	Zee Zee Top
2002
Tarfshi	Wrong Key	Fraulein
2001
Rebelline	Molomo	Golden Apples

2000-1991
2000
Lady Upstage	Preseli	Alluring
1999
Polaire	Lady In Waiting	Calando
1998
Alborada	Attractive Crown	Idle Rich
1997
Dance Design	Chania	Caiseal Ros
1996
Dance Design	Zafzala	Theano
1995
Flagbird	Russian Snows	Ballykett Nancy
1994
Del Deya	Ballykett Nancy	Kayfa
1993
Takarouna	Market Booster	Danse Royale
1992
Market Booster	Ruby Tiger	Khanata
1991
Ruby Tiger	High Pressure	Julie La Rousse

1990-1988
1990
Game Plan	Caerless Writing	Braiswick
1989
Noora Abu	Mamaluna	Slender Style
1988
Dark Lomond	Skating	Ardglen

The Pretty Polly Stakes is a Group 1 flat horse race in Ireland open to thoroughbred fillies and mares aged three years or older. It is run at the Curragh over a distance of 1 mile and 2 furlongs (2,012 metres), and it is scheduled to take place each year in late June or early July.

== History ==
The event is named after Pretty Polly, a successful filly foaled in Ireland in 1901. It was originally restricted to fillies aged three, but it was later opened to older horses. For a period it was classed at Group 2 level, and it was promoted to Group 1 status in 2004.

The Pretty Polly Stakes was part of the Breeders' Cup Challenge series from 2009 to 2012. The winner earned an automatic invitation to compete in the same year's Breeders' Cup Filly & Mare Turf.

== Records ==
Most successful horse (2 wins):

- Dance Design – 1996, 1997
- Alexander Goldrun – 2005, 2006

Leading jockey since 1950 (3 wins):

- Liam Ward – Atlantida (1956), Iskereen (1967), Rimark (1968)
- Bill Williamson – Icy Look (1961), Hibernia (1963), Pidget (1972)
- Johnny Roe – Place d'Etoile (1970), Hurry Harriet (1973), Miss Toshiba (1975)
- Lester Piggott – Mariel (1971), Godetia (1979), Calandra (1980)
- Christy Roche – Alydar's Best (1985), Fleur Royale (1986), Noora Abu (1989)
- Michael Kinane – Market Booster (1992), Dance Design (1996, 1997)
- Seamie Heffernan - Misty For Me (2011), Diamondsandrubies (2015), Magical (2020)

Leading trainer since 1950 (7 wins):

- Vincent O'Brien – Little Mo (1959), Ancasta (1964), Iskereen (1967), Rimark (1968), Godetia (1979), Calandra (1980), Dark Lomond (1988)

Leading owner since 1978 (5 wins) includes joint wins:

- Susan Magnier - Peeping Fawn (2007), Misty For Me (2011), Diamondsandrubies (2015), Minding (2016), Magical (2020)

== Winners since 1978 ==
Year	Winner	Age	Jockey	Trainer	Owner	Time
1978	Jinkitis	3	Dermot Hogan	Stephen Quirke	W. Fennin	2:10.00
1979	Godetia	3	Lester Piggott	Vincent O'Brien	Robert Sangster	2:04.80
1980	Calandra	3	Lester Piggott	Vincent O'Brien	Robert Sangster	2:13.50
1981	Happy Bride	3	Declan Gillespie	Jim Bolger	Mrs E. McMahon	2:06.90
1982	Prince's Polly	3	Wally Swinburn	Dermot Weld	Kerry Fitzpatrick
1983	Flame of Tara	3	Declan Gillespie	Jim Bolger	Patricia O'Kelly	2:05.70
1984	Princess Pati	3	Pat Shanahan	Con Collins	Meg Mullion	2:12.10
1985	Alydar's Best	3	Christy Roche	David O'Brien	Alan Clore
1986	Fleur Royale	3	Christy Roche	David O'Brien	Stavros Niarchos
1987	Bint Pasha	3	Richard Quinn	Paul Cole	Fahd Salman	2:12.10
1988	Dark Lomond	3	John Reid	Vincent O'Brien	Stavros Niarchos	2:07.50
1989	Noora Abu	7	Christy Roche	Jim Bolger	Catherine Shubotham	2:10.20
1990	Game Plan	3	Basil Marcus	Clive Brittain	Mrs Harold Phillips	2:06.80
1991	Ruby Tiger	4	Richard Quinn	Paul Cole	Mrs Philip Blacker	2:10.60
1992	Market Booster	3	Michael Kinane	Dermot Weld	Moyglare Stud Farm	2:00.60
1993	Takarouna	3	Johnny Murtagh	John Oxx	HH Aga Khan IV	2:06.00
1994	Del Deya	4	Frankie Dettori	John Gosden	Ahmed Al Maktoum	2:10.70
1995	Flagbird	4	Cash Asmussen	Saeed bin Suroor	Godolphin	2:07.10
1996	Dance Design	3	Michael Kinane	Dermot Weld	Moyglare Stud Farm	2:04.20
1997	Dance Design	4	Michael Kinane	Dermot Weld	Moyglare Stud Farm	2:09.00
1998	Alborada	3	George Duffield	Sir Mark Prescott	Kirsten Rausing	2:25.60
1999	Polaire	3	Declan McDonogh	Kevin Prendergast	Jim Halligan	2:05.10
2000	Lady Upstage	3	Michael Hills	Barry Hills	Bunny Roberts	2:07.70
2001	Rebelline	3	Declan McDonogh	Kevin Prendergast	Lady O'Reilly	2:08.60
2002	Tarfshi	4	Philip Robinson	Michael Jarvis	Ahmed Al Maktoum	2:04.60
2003	Hanami	3	Christophe Soumillon	James Toller	G. B. Partnership	2:05.30
2004	Chorist	5	Darryll Holland	William Haggas	Cheveley Park Stud	2:02.80
2005	Alexander Goldrun	4	Kevin Manning	Jim Bolger	Miriam O'Callaghan	2:05.70
2006	Alexander Goldrun	5	Kevin Manning	Jim Bolger	Miriam O'Callaghan	2:04.80
2007	Peeping Fawn	3	Kieren Fallon	Aidan O'Brien	Tabor / Magnier	2:10.63
2008	Promising Lead	4	Ryan Moore	Sir Michael Stoute	Khalid Abdullah	2:06.82
2009	Dar Re Mi	4	Jimmy Fortune	John Gosden	Lord Lloyd-Webber	2:14.04
2010	Chinese White	5	Pat Smullen	Dermot Weld	Lady O'Reilly	2:03.84
2011	Misty for Me	3	Seamie Heffernan	Aidan O'Brien	Tabor / Magnier / Smith	2:13.37
2012	Izzi Top	4	William Buick	John Gosden	Helena Springfield Ltd	2:15.05
2013	Ambivalent	4	Johnny Murtagh	Roger Varian	Ali Saeed	2:04.83
2014	Thistle Bird	6	George Baker	Roger Charlton	Lady Rothschild	2:05.58
2015	Diamondsandrubies	3	Seamie Heffernan	Aidan O'Brien	Roisin Henry & Sue Magnier	2:07.38
2016	Minding	3	Ryan Moore	Aidan O'Brien	Tabor / Magnier / Smith	2:09.94
2017	Nezwaah	4	Andrea Atzeni	Roger Varian	Ahmed Al Maktoum	2:06.19
2018	Urban Fox	4	Daniel Tudhope	William Haggas	Barnane Stud Ltd	2:06.98
2019	Iridessa	3	Wayne Lordan	Joseph O'Brien	Chantal Regalado-Gonzalez	2:06.46
2020	Magical	5	Seamie Heffernan	Aidan O'Brien	Smith / Magnier / Tabor	2:12.29
2021	Thundering Nights	4	Shane Crosse	Joseph O'Brien	Shapoor Mistry	2:08.72
2022	La Petite Coco	4	Billy Lee	Paddy Twomey	Team Valor	2:13.86
2023	Via Sistina	5	Jamie Spencer	George Boughey	Mrs R G Hillen	2:06.17
2024	Bluestocking	4	Rossa Ryan	Ralph Beckett	Juddmonte	2:10.90
2025	Whirl	3	Ryan Moore	Aidan O'Brien	Tabor / Magnier / Smith	2:04.95
2026	Estrange	5	Daniel Tudhope	David O'Meara	Cheveley Park Stud	2:02.89

== Earlier winners ==
- 1948: Cobaltic
- 1949: Circus Lady
- 1950: Lonely Maid
- 1951: Ash Plant
- 1952: Nashua
- 1953: Northern Gleam
- 1954: Belle Collette
- 1955: Free Model
- 1956: Atlantida
- 1957: After the Show
- 1958: Owenello
- 1959: Little Mo
- 1960: Young Empress
- 1961: Icy Look
- 1962: Tropic Star
- 1963: Hibernia
- 1964: Ancasta
- 1965: Messene
- 1966: Black Gold
- 1967: Iskereen
- 1968: Rimark
- 1969: Borana
- 1970: Place d'Etoile
- 1971: Mariel
- 1972: Pidget
- 1973: Hurry Harriet
- 1974: Northern Gem
- 1975: Miss Toshiba
- 1976: Lady Singer
- 1977: Claire's Slipper

== See also ==
- Pretty Polly Stakes (Great Britain)
- Horse racing in Ireland
- List of Irish flat horse races
