= Generous (horse) =

Irish-bred Thoroughbred racehorse

- Racing silks of Fahd Salman
- Sire: Caerleon
- Grandsire: Nijinsky
- Dam: Doff the Derby
- Damsire: Master Derby
- Sex: Stallion
- Foaled: 8 February 1988
- Died: 15 January 2013 Craigavon, County Armagh, Northern Ireland
- Country: Ireland
- Colour: Chestnut
- Breeder: Barronstown Stud
- Owner: Fahd bin Salman
- Trainer: Paul Cole
- Record: 11: 6-1-1
- Earnings: £1,119,944

Major wins
- Dewhurst Stakes (1990); Epsom Derby (1991); Irish Derby (1991); King George VI and Queen Elizabeth Stakes (1991)

Awards
- Timeform rating: 139

Honours
- British Horse of the Year (1991); Irish Horse of the Year (1991); Timeform top-rated horse (1991)
- Last updated on 26 February 2007

Generous (8 February 1988 – 15 January 2013) was an Irish-bred, British-trained Thoroughbred racehorse who in 1991 won both the Epsom and the Irish Derby. As a two-year-old he won three of his six races, most notably the Dewhurst Stakes as a 50/1 outsider. He finished fourth in the 2000 Guineas on his three-year-old debut, but showed vastly improved form when moved up to longer distances in summer. In a period of seven weeks he won the Derby by five lengths, the Irish Derby by three lengths and the King George VI and Queen Elizabeth Stakes by a record seven lengths. His performances established him as one of the outstanding British racehorses of his era. After running poorly in the Prix de l'Arc de Triomphe he was retired to stud, where his record was disappointing.

== Background ==
Generous was a flaxen chestnut horse with a white star and snip bred by the Barronstown Stud in County Wicklow, Ireland. He was foaled on 8 February 1988.

Generous was sired by Caerleon, an American-bred colt who won the Prix du Jockey Club and the Benson and Hedges Gold Cup in 1983 when trained in Ireland by Vincent O'Brien. Caerleon sired many other good winners including Marienbard, Lady Carla, Cape Verdi and Warrsan. The success of Generous enabled Caerleon to claim his only British sires' championship in 1991. Generous' dam, Doff The Derby a daughter of the Preakness Stakes winner Master Derby who was a son of the 1970 Kentucky Derby winner, Dust Commander. Doff the Derby later produced The Oaks winner Imagine. As a daughter of Margarethen, Doff The Derby was closely related to the outstanding racemares Trillion and Triptych.

Generous was sold as a foal to the bloodstock agent Hamish Alexander for 80,000 Irish guineas. In the following year he was sent to the Goff's sale where he was bought for 200,000 Irish guineas by Fahd Salman. Then he was trained by Paul Cole at his stable at Whatcombe in Oxfordshire. Generous was ridden in six of his first seven races by Richard Quinn. In his last four races he was ridden by Alan Munro.

== Racing career ==
=== 1990: two-year-old season ===
Generous made his racecourse debut on 2 May at Ascot Racecourse when he contested a Graduation race (restricted to horses who had won no more than once) over five furlongs. Starting at odds of 6/1 against five opponents, he took the lead a furlong from the finish and won by half a length from Les Animaux Nuages with the future Diomed Stakes winner Sylva Honda in fourth.

In June, Generous was moved up in class to contest the Coventry Stakes over six furlongs at Royal Ascot. Ridden by Willie Carson he finished second to Mac's Imp. In August he was sent to Goodwood Racecourse for the Vintage Stakes in which he finished third behind Mukaddamah. Seventeen days later he was sent to Deauville Racecourse in France and made no impression in the Prix Morny, finishing tenth behind Hector Protector.

Generous was dropped in class on his return to England, where he was an easy winner of a minor stakes race at Sandown Park Racecourse on 18 September. Generous' final appearance of the season was in Britain's most prestigious race for two-year-olds, the Dewhurst Stakes at Newmarket Racecourse on 19 October. He was given little chance and was sent off at odds of 50/1 in a field of eight runners. Quinn restrained the colt in the early stages before producing a strong late run to overtake Bog Trotter inside the final furlong and record an upset victory by three-quartes of a length.

=== 1991: three-year-old season ===
On his first appearance of 1991, Generous, whose preparation had been delayed by a hoof injury, contested the 2000 Guineas over Newmarket's Rowley Mile on 4 May. He started at odds of 11/1 and finished fourth of the fourteen runners behind Mystiko, Lycius and Ganges. After the Guineas, Paul Cole's stable jockey was replaced as Generous's rider by Alan Munro, reportedly at the insistence of the colt's owner.

On 5 June 1991 Generous, ridden for the first time by Munro, started the 9/1 fifth favourite in a field of thirteen for the 211th running of the Derby. Toulon and Corrupt started joint-favourites ahead of Mystiko and Hector Protector. Generous was settled in third place behind Mystiko before moving up to take the lead early in the straight. He quickly went clear of the field and won by five lengths from Marju, who finished seven lengths clear of Star of Gdansk and Hector Protector.

On 30 June Generous was sent to contest the Irish Derby at the Curragh in which he was matched against the leading French-trained colt Suave Dancer, the winner of the Prix du Jockey Club. Generous took the lead half a mile from the finish and held off the challenge of Suave Dancer in the straight to win by three lengths. A month later, Generous was tested against older horses for the first time in Britain's most prestigious all-aged race, the King George VI and Queen Elizabeth Stakes at Ascot. Starting the 4/6 favourite he took the lead early in the straight and pulled clear of the field to win by seven lengths from Sanglamore. The winning margin was the widest ever recorded in the race, surpassing Mill Reef's six length win in 1971.

On 6 October Generous started odds-on favourite for the Prix de l'Arc de Triomphe at Longchamp Racecourse. He pulled hard in the early stages and faded in the straight, finishing eighth of the fourteen runners behind Suave Dancer.

== Assessment ==
Generous was given a rating of 139 by the independent Timeform organisation, making him the highest-rated racehorse of the year. In their book A Century of Champions, John Randall and Tony Morris rated Generous a “great” Derby winner, the sixteenth best British or Irish racehorse of the 20th century and the best racehorse in the world in 1991.

== Stud career ==
Generous was retired after the 1991 racing season to stud duty at Salman's Banstead Manor stud in England where he remained until 1995. He was sent to a breeder in Japan in 1996, where he sired 147 runners, then to New Zealand in 1999. In 2002, he returned to Europe, where he spent time at the Scarvagh Stud in Northern Ireland and the Sandley Stud in Dorset.

Generous was not a particularly successful breeding stallion. The best of his progeny was probably Catella, a German-bred filly who won the Group One Grosser Erdgas-Preis in 2000. His other good winners included Bahr (Ribblesdale Stakes), Copeland (Scottish Champion Hurdle), and Blueprint (Jockey Club Stakes).

He died on 15 January 2013 at the age of twenty-five and was buried at Buller's Stud Farm Grounds, Craigavon, County Armagh, Northern Ireland Alfie Buller, the owner of the Scarvagh Stud, described him as "unbelievably intelligent for a horse, kind and truly regal... he will be sadly missed."

== Pedigree ==
Pedigree of Generous (IRE), chestnut stallion, 1988
Sire Caerleon (USA) 1980	Nijinsky (CAN); 1967	Northern Dancer	Nearctic
Sire Caerleon (USA) 1980	Nijinsky (CAN); 1967	Northern Dancer	Natalma
Sire Caerleon (USA) 1980	Nijinsky (CAN); 1967	Flaming Page	Bull Page
Sire Caerleon (USA) 1980	Nijinsky (CAN); 1967	Flaming Page	Flaring Top
Sire Caerleon (USA) 1980	Foreseer (USA); 1969	Round Table	Princequillo
Sire Caerleon (USA) 1980	Foreseer (USA); 1969	Round Table	Knight's Daughter
Sire Caerleon (USA) 1980	Foreseer (USA); 1969	Regal Gleam	Hail To Reason
Sire Caerleon (USA) 1980	Foreseer (USA); 1969	Regal Gleam	Miz Carol
Dam Doff the Derby (USA) 1981	Master Derby (USA); 1972	Dust Commander	Bold Commander
Dam Doff the Derby (USA) 1981	Master Derby (USA); 1972	Dust Commander	Dust Storm
Dam Doff the Derby (USA) 1981	Master Derby (USA); 1972	Madam Jerry	Royal Coinage
Dam Doff the Derby (USA) 1981	Master Derby (USA); 1972	Madam Jerry	Our Kretchen
Dam Doff the Derby (USA) 1981	Margarethen (USA); 1962	Tulyar	Tehran
Dam Doff the Derby (USA) 1981	Margarethen (USA); 1962	Tulyar	Neocracy
Dam Doff the Derby (USA) 1981	Margarethen (USA); 1962	Russ-Marie	Nasrullah
Dam Doff the Derby (USA) 1981	Margarethen (USA); 1962	Russ-Marie	Marguery (Family:4-n)
