= Martyn Arbib =

British businessman

Sir Martyn Arbib
- Born: Martyn Arbib; 29 June 1939 (age 85); Hendon, London
- Education: Felsted School
- Occupation: Businessman

Sir Martyn Arbib (born 27 June 1939) is a British businessman who founded and led the Perpetual fund management company during the late 20th century.

== Early life ==
Arbib was born in Hendon on 29 June 1939, and attended Felsted School, Essex. His family is Jewish.

== Career ==
Arbib founded Perpetual Limited in 1973 in a small office at Hart Street, Henley-on-Thames, Oxfordshire. The company remained in the town as it expanded into newly built headquarters in 1994.

He sold Perpetual to the fund manager AMVESCAP in 2001 for more than £1 billion, receiving £113m together with AMVESCAP shares worth £300m, and the company became known as Invesco Perpetual. He is a director of the Perpetual Japanese Investment Trust plc. He stepped down from Perpetual's board in 2015.

In January 2008, Swindon Town Holdings Limited, where Arbib is an investor but not a director, took control of Swindon Town FC.

The Arbib Foundation, established in 1987, sponsors schools in Slough, Berkshire which include the Langley Academy. Arbib was a major benefactor in the establishment of the River and Rowing Museum at Henley, which opened in 1998. He was knighted in 2003 for services to charities, especially in education.

=== Political activity ===
Arbib is a Conservative Party donor. During the 2019 general election, he donated £10,000 to the central party and £5,000 each to Conservative candidates Danny Kruger and Dominic Raab.

== Personal life ==
In his spare time, Arbib is interested in horse racing. His horse Snurge won the St. Leger Stakes in 1990. As well as Henley, he also has a home in Barbados.

His daughter Annabel is married to businessman Paddy Nicoll. Her father bought Culham Court for her in 1997 for £12 million, and in 2006, the Swiss-born British financier Urs Schwarzenbach bought it for £35 million, £10 million above the asking price.
