= Paul Cole =

British racehorse trainer

Paul F. I. Cole (born 11 September 1941) is a British racehorse trainer. Since 1987 he has been based at Whatcombe Estate in Berkshire, the former stables of Dick Dawson and Arthur Budgett.

He was British flat racing Champion Trainer in 1991, the year in which he trained Generous to win the Epsom Derby. Notable owners he has trained for include Prince Fahd bin Salman and Martyn Arbib, and regular jockeys have been Richard Quinn and Alan Munro. In March 2020 Cole took out a joint training licence with his son, Oliver, who had previously been his assistant trainer.

== Major wins ==
(United Kingdom) Great Britain

- Ascot Gold Cup – (1) – Mr Dinos (2003)
- Cheveley Park Stakes – (1) – Pass the Peace (1988)
- Derby – (1) – Generous (1991)
- Dewhurst Stakes – (1) – Generous (1990)
- Fillies' Mile – (1) – Culture Vulture (1991)
- King George VI and Queen Elizabeth Stakes – (1) – Generous (1991)
- Lockinge Stakes – (1) – Broken Hearted (1988)
- Nassau Stakes – (2) – Ruby Tiger (1991, 1992)
- St. Leger – (1) – Snurge (1990)
- Sun Chariot Stakes – (1) – Lady in Waiting (1999)
- Yorkshire Oaks – (1) – Bint Pasha (1987)

Canada

- Canadian International Stakes – (1) – Snurge (1992)
- E. P. Taylor Stakes – (1) – Ruby Tiger (1990)

France

- Poule d'Essai des Pouliches – (1) – Culture Vulture (1992)
- Prix de la Forêt – (1) – Sarab (1986)
- Prix d'Ispahan – (1) – Zoman (1992)
- Prix Marcel Boussac – (1) – Culture Vulture (1991)
- Prix Royal-Oak – (1) – Mr Dinos (2002)
- Prix de la Salamandre – (1) – John de Coombe (1977)
- Prix Vermeille – (1) – Bint Pasha (1987)

Germany

- Grosser Preis von Berlin – (1) – Ibn Bey (1990)
- Preis von Europa – (1) – Ibn Bey (1989)

(Republic of Ireland) Ireland

- Irish Derby – (1) – Generous (1991)
- Irish Oaks – (1) – Knight's Baroness (1990)
- Irish St. Leger – (2) – Ibn Bey (1990), Strategic Choice (1995)
- Pretty Polly Stakes – (2) – Bint Pasha (1987), Ruby Tiger (1991)
- Tattersalls Gold Cup – (1) – Zoman (1991)

Italy

- Derby Italiano – (2) – Zaizoom (1987), Time Star (1994)
- Gran Criterium – (1) – Torrismondo (1993)
- Gran Premio d'Italia – (1) – Posidonas (1995)
- Gran Premio di Milano – (2) – Snurge (1991), Strategic Choice (1996)
- Oaks d'Italia – (1) – Bright Generation (1993)
- Premio Lydia Tesio – (1) – Ruby Tiger (1990)
- Premio Presidente della Repubblica – (1) – Great Palm (1993)

United States

- Washington, D.C. International Stakes – (1) – Zoman (1992)
