= Richard Quinn (jockey) =

Scottish jockey

Thomas Richard Quinn, better known as Richard Quinn (born 2 December 1961) is a Scottish jockey.

== Life and career ==
After leaving Bannockburn High School in 1977, aged 15, he moved to York to work as a stable lad. This career led to Quinn moving to work for Paul Cole in Lambourn for 17 years (1981–1998). After some years as a freelance jockey, he joined Henry Cecil in Newmarket (2000–2004). Quinn has raced with owners Prince Fahd bin Salman (1990–1991) and John L. Dunlop. Among other victories, Quinn has achieved 26 victories at Goodwood Racecourse. He briefly retired in 2006, only to return to racing early the next year.

Quinn now lives in Stirling Scotland

== Selected victories ==
- 1987 - Derby Italiano (riding Zaizoom)
- 1990 - Irish St. Leger (riding Ibn Bey)
- 1990 - Irish Oaks (riding Knight's Baroness)
- 1990 - St. Leger Stakes (riding Snurge)
- 1994 - Derby Italiano (riding Time Star)
- 1994 - Goodwood Cup (riding Tioman Island)
- 2000 - Epsom Oaks (riding Love Divine)
- 2000 - St. Leger Stakes (riding Millenary)
- 2001 - Goodwood Cup (riding Persian Punch)
