= 1992 Epsom Derby =

- Location: Epsom Downs Racecourse
- Date: 3 June 1992
- Winning horse: Dr Devious
- Starting price: 8/1
- Jockey: John Reid
- Trainer: Peter Chapple-Hyam
- Owner: Luciano Gaucci & Sidney Craig

Epsom Derby 1992
1-2-3
Dr Devious	St Jovite	Silver Wisp

Also Ran
4-5-6
Muhtarram	Twist And Turn	Alflora
7-8-9
Alnasr Alwasheek	Great Palm	Rodrigo De Triano
10-11-12
Thourios	Rainbow Corner	Well Saddled
13-14-15
Assessor	Paradise Navy	Lobilio
16-17-18
Pollen Count	Ninja Dancer	Young Freeman

The 1992 Epsom Derby was a horse race which took place at Epsom Downs on Wednesday 3 June 1992. It was the 213th running of the Derby, and it was won by Dr Devious. The winner was ridden by John Reid and trained by Peter Chapple-Hyam. The pre-race favourite Rodrigo de Triano finished ninth.

== Race details ==
- Sponsor: Ever Ready
- Winner's prize money: £355,000
- Going: Good (Good to Soft in last 4 furlongs)
- Number of runners: 18
- Winner's time: 2m 36.19s

== Full result ==
	*	Horse	Jockey	Trainer ^{†}	SP
1		Dr Devious	John Reid	Peter Chapple-Hyam	8/1
2	2	St Jovite	Christy Roche	Jim Bolger (IRE)	14/1
3	shd	Silver Wisp	Paul Eddery	Geoff Lewis	11/1
4	3½	Muhtarram	Willie Carson	John Gosden	9/1
5	2½	Twist and Turn	Michael Kinane	Henry Cecil	12/1
6	2½	Alflora	Richard Quinn	Clive Brittain	200/1
7	hd	Alnasr Alwasheek	Steve Cauthen	Michael Stoute	9/1
8	1	Great Palm	Alan Munro	Paul Cole	10/1
9	2	Rodrigo de Triano	Lester Piggott	Peter Chapple-Hyam	13/2 fav
10	2½	Thourios	Michael Roberts	Guy Harwood	50/1
11	nk	Rainbow Corner	Pat Eddery	André Fabre (FR)	9/1
12	2	Well Saddled	John Williams	David Elsworth	150/1
13	6	Assessor	Walter Swinburn	Richard Hannon, Sr.	9/1
14	10	Paradise Navy	George Duffield	Clive Brittain	250/1
15	2	Lobilio	Richard Hills	Clive Brittain	250/1
16	1½	Pollen Count	Frankie Dettori	John Gosden	14/1
17	¾	Ninja Dancer	Michael Hills	Julie Cecil	100/1
18	20	Young Freeman	Bruce Raymond	Guy Harwood	66/1

* The distances between the horses are shown in lengths or shorter. shd = short-head; hd = head; nk = neck.
† Trainers are based in Great Britain unless indicated.

== Winner's details ==
Further details of the winner, Dr Devious:

- Foaled: 10 March 1989, in Ireland
- Sire: Ahonoora; Dam: Rose of Jericho (Alleged)
- Owner: Sidney H. Craig
- Breeder: Lyonstown Stud
- Rating in 1992 International Classifications: 125

== Form analysis ==
=== Two-year-old races ===
Notable runs by the future Derby participants as two-year-olds in 1991.

- Dr Devious – 2nd Coventry Stakes, 1st Superlative Stakes, 1st Vintage Stakes, 1st Dewhurst Stakes
- St Jovite – 1st Anglesey Stakes, 1st Futurity Stakes, 4th Grand Critérium
- Twist and Turn – 3rd Royal Lodge Stakes
- Alflora – 4th Washington Singer Stakes
- Great Palm – 2nd Dewhurst Stakes
- Rodrigo de Triano – 1st Washington Singer Stakes, 1st Champagne Stakes, 1st Middle Park Stakes
- Thourios – 5th Vintage Stakes, 3rd Dewhurst Stakes, 7th Racing Post Trophy
- Rainbow Corner – 2nd Prix La Rochette, 2nd Grand Critérium
- Assessor – 3rd Washington Singer Stakes, 3rd Racing Post Trophy
- Ninja Dancer – 1st Autumn Stakes, 5th Racing Post Trophy

=== The road to Epsom ===
Early-season appearances in 1992 and trial races prior to running in the Derby.

- Dr Devious – 2nd Craven Stakes, 7th Kentucky Derby
- St Jovite – 4th Gladness Stakes, 1st Derrinstown Stud Derby Trial
- Silver Wisp – 3rd Easter Stakes, 4th 2,000 Guineas
- Muhtarram – 4th Craven Stakes, 5th 2,000 Guineas
- Twist and Turn – 1st Feilden Stakes, 1st Chester Vase
- Alflora – 5th Greenham Stakes, 7th Sandown Classic Trial, 5th Dante Stakes
- Alnasr Alwasheek – 1st Craven Stakes, 9th 2,000 Guineas, 1st Dante Stakes
- Great Palm – 2nd Dante Stakes
- Rodrigo de Triano – 4th Greenham Stakes, 1st 2,000 Guineas, 1st Irish 2,000 Guineas
- Thourios – 7th 2,000 Guineas
- Rainbow Corner – 1st Prix de Fontainebleau, 2nd Poule d'Essai des Poulains
- Assessor – 3rd Sandown Classic Trial, 1st Lingfield Derby Trial
- Pollen Count – 1st Sandown Classic Trial
- Ninja Dancer – 8th Feilden Stakes, 5th Predominate Stakes
- Young Freeman – 4th Predominate Stakes

=== Subsequent Group 1 wins ===
Group 1 / Grade I victories after running in the Derby.

- Dr Devious – Irish Champion Stakes (1992)
- St Jovite – Irish Derby (1992), King George VI and Queen Elizabeth Stakes (1992)
- Muhtarram – Irish Champion Stakes (1993), Premio Presidente della Repubblica (1994)
- Great Palm – Premio Presidente della Repubblica (1993)
- Rodrigo de Triano – International Stakes (1992), Champion Stakes (1992)
- Assessor – Prix Royal-Oak (1992), Prix du Cadran (1993)

== Subsequent breeding careers ==
Leading progeny of participants in the 1992 Epsom Derby.

=== Sires of Group/Grade One winners ===
Dr Devious (1st) – Stood in Japan, Ireland and Italy

- Collier Hill – 1st Irish St. Leger (2005)
- Kinnaird – 1st Prix de l'Opéra (2005) Dam of Berkshire (1st Royal Lodge Stakes 2013)
- London Bridge – 2nd Oka Sho (1998) Dam of Daiwa El Cielo (1st Yushun Himba 2004)
- Demophilos – 2nd St Leger Stakes (2001)

St Jovite (2nd)

- Amerique – 1st San Juan Capistrano Handicap (1998)
- Saint's Honor – 1st San Fernando Breeders' Cup (2000)
- Equerry – 3rd Eclipse Stakes (2002)
- Baranja – 3rd Premio Regina Elena (2001)

=== Sires of National Hunt horses ===
Alflora (6th)

- Wishfull Thinking – 1st Old Roan Chase (2014)
- What A Friend – 1st totesport Bowl (2010)
- Farmer Jack – 1st Aon Chase (2005)
- Central House – 1st Paddy Power Dial-A-Bet Chase (2004)

Great Palm (8th)

- Great Love – 1st Prix Alain du Breil (2002)
- Rock And Palm – 1st Prix La Barka (2005)
- Donnas Palm – 1st Tara Hurdle (2009)
- Great Jane – Dam of Galop Marin (1st Grand Prix d'Automne 2018,2019)

Assessor (13th)

- Anibale Fly – 2nd Cheltenham Gold Cup (2019)
- My Way de Solzen – 1st Long Walk Hurdle (2005)
- Reve de Sivola – 1st Long Walk Hurdle (2012, 2013, 2014)
- Coo Star Sivola – 1st Ultima Handicap Chase (2018)

=== Other Stallions ===
Rodrigo De Triano (9th) – Erimo Excel (1st Yushun Himba 1998), Super Hornet (2nd Mile Championship 2007, 2008), Rodrigo Rose (3rd Winter Stakes 2004)
Muhtarram (4th) – Fight Your Corner (1st Henry II Stakes 2005), Muakaad (1st Meld Stakes 2001), Maycocks Bay (Dam of Sariska)
Twist and Turn (5th) – Exported to India
Alnasr Alwasheek (7th) – Minor flat winners – Exported to India
Rainbow Corner (11th) – Exported to Argentina – Exported to Brazil (sperm used for polo horses)
Pollen Count (16th) – Exported to Zimbabwe
