= 1991 King George VI and Queen Elizabeth Stakes =

41st King George VI and Queen Elizabeth Stakes
- King George VI and Queen Elizabeth Stakes
- Location: Ascot Racecourse
- Date: 27 July 1991
- Winning horse: Generous (IRE)
- Jockey: Alan Munro
- Trainer: Paul Cole (GB)
- Owner: Fahd Salman

The 1991 King George VI and Queen Elizabeth Stakes was a horse race held at Ascot Racecourse on Saturday 27 July 1991. It was the 41st running of the King George VI and Queen Elizabeth Stakes.

The winner was Fahd Salman's Generous, a three-year-old chestnut colt trained at Whatcombe in Oxfordshire by Paul Cole and ridden by Alan Munro. Generous's victory gave his owner, trainer and jockey their first win in the race.

== The race ==
The race attracted a field of nine runners, all trained in the United Kingdom. The favourite was Generous, who had won the Epsom Derby by five lengths before defeating Suave Dancer in the Irish Derby. Two of Generous's best regarded challengers were trained by Michael Stoute: Saddler's Hall was a three-year-old colt who had bypassed the Derby but won the King Edward VII Stakes at Royal Ascot by six lengths, whilst the four-year-old Rock Hopper had won the Hardwicke Stakes and the 1991 Princess of Wales's Stakes. Another major contender was Sanglamore, the Henry Cecil-trained winner of the Prix du Jockey Club and the Prix d'Ispahan. Clive Brittain's Newmarket stable had three runners: the dual Earl of Sefton Stakes winner Terimon, the Chester Vase runner-up Luchiroverte and the Derby Italiano winner Hailsham. The other runners were Tiger Flower, the only female contender, and Sapience, the winner of the Ebor Handicap and the 1990 Princess of Wales's Stakes. Generous headed the betting at odds of 4/6 ahead of Saddler's Hall (6/1), Sanglamore (7/1) and Rock Hopper (8/1).

Hailsham went into the lead from the start and set a strong pace from Saddler's Hall, Luchiroverte and Generous. When Hailsham began to weaken with five furlongs left to run, Saddler's Hall took the advantage and led the field into the straight ahead of Generous, Luchiroverte and Rock Hopper, with Sanglamore making progress on the outside. Two furlongs from the finish, Generous accelerated past Saddler's Hall and quickly went several lengths clear of the field. Sanglamore moved into second place but could make no impression on the leader. Generous won easily by seven lengths from Sanglamore, with Rock Hopper and Terimon in third and fourth places. Sapience came home fifth ahead of Saddler's Hall, with long gaps back to Luchiroverte, Tiger Flower and Hailsham.

== Race details ==
- Sponsor: De Beers
- Purse: £451,600; First prize: £278,480
- Surface: Turf
- Going: Good
- Distance: 12 furlongs
- Number of runners: 9
- Winner's time: 2:28.99

== Full result ==
Pos.	Marg.	Horse (bred)	Age	Jockey	Trainer (Country)	Odds
1		Generous (IRE)	3	Alan Munro	Paul Cole (GB)	4/6 fav
2	7	Sanglamore (IRE)	4	Pat Eddery	Roger Charlton (GB)	7/1
3	1	Rock Hopper (GB)	4	Bruce Raymond	Michael Stoute (GB)	7/1
4	1½	Terimon (GB)	5	Michael Roberts	Clive Brittain (GB)	18/1
5	2	Sapience (IRE)	5	Willie Carson	Jimmy Fitzgerald (GB)	40/1
6	3½	Saddlers' Hall (IRE)	3	Lester Piggott	Michael Stoute (GB)	6/1
7	10	Luchiroverte (IRE)	3	Frankie Dettori	Clive Brittain (GB)	66/1
8	15	Tiger Flower (GB)	4	Steve Cauthen	Henry Cecil (GB)	10/1
9	30	Hailsham (CAN)	3	Ray Cochrane	Clive Brittain (GB)	100/1

- Abbreviations: nse = nose; nk = neck; shd = head; hd = head; dist = distance; UR = unseated rider

== Winner's details ==
Further details of the winner, Generous

- Sex: Colt
- Foaled: 8 February 1988
- Country: Ireland
- Sire: Caerleon; Dam: Doff The Derby (Master Derby)
- Owner: Fahd Salman
- Breeder: Barronstown Stud
