= Sikeston (horse) =

American-bred Thoroughbred racehorse

- Sire: Lear Fan
- Grandsire: Roberto
- Dam: Small Timer
- Damsire: Lyphard
- Sex: Stallion
- Foaled: 9 April 1986
- Country: United States
- Colour: Bay
- Breeder: J R Gaines & H R Hart & W Simon
- Owner: Allevamento White Star; V Gaucci Del Bono; Luciano Gaucci
- Trainer: John Dunlop; Clive Brittain
- Record: 34: 11-5-4
- Earnings: £723,471

Major wins
- Gran Criterium (1988); Premio Parioli (1989); Premio Natale di Roma (1990); Premio Ribot (1990); Premio Vittorio di Capua (1990, 1991); Premio Presidente della Repubblica (1991, 1992); Queen Anne Stakes (1991); Premio Roma (1991); Irish International Stakes (1992)

Sikeston (foaled 9 April 1986 – after 2003) was an American-bred, British-trained Thoroughbred racehorse who had his greatest success in Italy. In five years on the track, he ran 34 times and won 11 races, seven of them at Group 1 level, three at Group 2 and one at Group 3 and was also placed in several major races. He produced most of his best performances on soft or heavy going. He won the Gran Criterium as a two-year-old in 1988 and the Premio Parioli in the following spring. As a four-year-old in 1990 he won the Premio Natale di Roma, Premio Ribot and Premio Vittorio di Capua. In the following season he took the Premio Vittorio di Capua for a second time as well as the Premio Presidente della Repubblica, Queen Anne Stakes and Premio Roma. In his final season on the track he won a second Premio Presidente della Repubblica and the Irish International Stakes.

== Background ==
Sikeston was a bay horse bred in Kentucky by John R Gaines, H R Hart & W Simon. As a yearling he was put up for auction at the Fasig-Tipton Kentucky Summer Yearling Sale and bought for $25,000 by V M Zuco. The colt entered the ownership of the Italian entrepreneur Luciano Gaucci's Allevamento White Star and was sent into training with John Dunlop at Arundel, West Sussex.

He was sired by Lear Fan, an American stallion who raced in Europe, winning the Prix Jacques le Marois in 1984. His other progeny included Good Ba Ba and Ryafan. Sikeston's dam Small Timer was unraced but produced several other winners including Klokka (Magic Night Stakes). She was a female-line descendant of Top Flight.

== Racing career ==
=== 1988: two-year-old season ===
Sikeston made his racecourse debut in a maiden race over seven furlongs on good to firm ground at Newmarket Racecourse in which he started at odds of 16/1 and finished second, beaten two lengths by the Henry Cecil-trained Samoan. The colt ran second when odds-on favourite for a minor race at York Racecourse in July and then finished third at Chepstow in September. On his final run of the season Sikeston made his first appearance in Italy when he contested the Group 1 Gran Criterium over 1600 metres on soft ground at San Siro Racecourse in Milan. Ridden by Gianfranco Dettori he won by eight lengths from Lacbell and Star Shareef (also trained by Dunlop).

=== 1989: three-year-old season ===
On his debut as a three-year-old Sikeston started a 33/1 outsider for the Greenham Stakes at Newbury Racecourse on 15 April and finished tenth of the twelve runners behind Zayyani. Fifteen days after his poor run at Newbury, the colt was sent to Italy again for the Premio Parioli at Capannelle Racecourse in Rome in which he was again partnered by Dettori. After racing towards the rear of the nineteen-runner field he took the lead 100 metres from the finish and won by a length from the French-trained Lioubovnik. In May he was stepped up in distance for the Derby Italiano over 2400 metres at Capanelle and ran unplaced behind the Michael Jarvis-trained Prorutori.

=== 1990: four-year-old season ===
After a break of well over ten months, Sikeston returned in April 1990 for the Group 3 Premio Natale di Roma over 1600 metres at Capannelle. Racing on heavy ground, and partnered by Michael Roberts he won by one and a half lengths from Irgaim.

For his second run of the season he was sent to France for the Prix Jacques le Marois at Deauville Racecourse in August and came home unplaced behind Priolo. After this race he was transferred to the stable of Clive Brittain at Newmarket, Suffolk. In September he produced arguably his best performance up to that time when he contested the Phoenix Champion Stakes in Ireland for which he started a 66/1 outsider and finished second, beaten half a length by Elmaamul. In October he ran unplaced in both the Prix de l'Arc de Triomphe and the Champion Stakes.

Sikeston's last three races of 1990 were in Italy. On 4 November he came home five lengths clear of Irgaim to win the Group 2 Premio Ribot over 1600 metres on heavy ground at Capannelle and a week later, at the same track he ran third to Legal Case and the Premio Parioli winner Candy Glen in the Group 1 Premio Roma over 2000 metres. On his final run of the year he contested the Group 1 Premio Vittorio di Capua over 1600 metres at Milan on 16 November. With Roberts in the saddle he won by three lengths and a neck from Candy Glen and Zoman.

=== 1991: five-year-old season ===
In April in Paris Sikeston began his fourth season with two starts at Longchamp, finishing second to Panoramic in the Prix d'Harcourt and fourth behind Kartajana in the Prix Ganay. The Premio Presidente della Repubblica over 2000 metres on heavy ground at Capannelle on 12 May saw Sikeston matched against eight opponents. After turning into the straight in fifth place he took the lead 400 metres from the finish and kept on well to win by half a length from Fleeting Wish.

After finishing sixth to Sanglamore in the Prix d'Ispahan at Chantilly Racecourse on 2 June, Sikeston was sent to Royal Ascot sixteen days later for the Queen Anne Stakes (then a Group 2 race open to three-year-olds) over the straight mile course. In a nine-runner field he started the 9/1 fifth choice in the betting behind Candy Glen, Bold Russian, Lord Charmer and Rami. After tracking the leaders, he went to the front approaching the final furlong and "held on gamely" to win by a head from Rami.

In his next three races Sikeston finished fourth to Second Set in the Sussex Stakes at Goodwood in July, seventh to Priolo in the Prix du Moulin at Longchamp and seventh behind Selkirk in the Queen Elizabeth II Stakes at Ascot on 28 September. On 13 October Sikeston attempted to repeat his 1990 success in the Premio Vittorio di Capua and faced nine opponents on heavy ground. He took the lead 300 metres out, and opened up a clear lead before being eased down by Roberts in the final strides to by one and a half lengths from the Premio Parioli winner Misil.

After being beaten by Misil in the Premio Ribot, Sikeston ended his campaign in the Premio Roma on 10 November when he faced ten opponents including Legal Case, Zoman, Passing Sale (Gran Premio del Jockey Club) and Lara's Idea (Premio Lydia Tesio). He turned into the straight in second place, went to the front 400 metres from the finish and won by two lengths from Lara's Idea, with Zoman in third.

=== 1992: six-year-old season ===
Sikeston made no impact on his first two starts as a six-year-old, finishing towards the rear in the Prix d'Harcourt on 5 April and the THF Mile at Sandown Park later that month. On 17 May in Rome the horse's bid to land back-to-back editions of the Premio Presidente della Repubblica saw him opposed by six rivals including Lara's Idea and the Prix Jean Prat winner Sillery. After being restrained by Robert in the early running he took the lead in the last 300 metres and held off a late challenge from Sillery to win by half a length. Sikeston's victory was his tenth Group race win and his seventh at Group 1 level.

In his next two races, Sikeston ran third to Misil in the Premio Emilio Turati in Rome on 7 June and third again in the Queen Anne Stakes at Royal Ascot nine days later. In the latter event he produced one of his best efforts in defeat as he was beaten a head and half a length by Lahib and Second Set with Exit To Nowhere in fourth. On 28 June ran in Ireland for the first time in almost two years when he started 3/1 second favourite for the Group 2 Sea World International Stakes over one mile at the Curragh. Carrying a weight of 140 pounds, he won by two lengths and a head from Sure Sharp and Rami.

In his last two races, Sikeston finished fifth to Marling in the Sussex Stakes and then ran unplaced behind Exit To Nowhere in the Prix Jacques le Marois at Deauville Racecourse on 16 August.

== Stud record ==
At the end of his racing career, Sikeston was retired to become a breeding stallion in Italy. He sired several minor winners, but no horses of any consequence. His last foals were born in 2004.

== Pedigree ==
Pedigree of Sikeston (USA), bay stallion, 1986
Sire Lear Fan (USA) 1986	Roberto; 1969	Hail to Reason	Turn-To (IRE)
Sire Lear Fan (USA) 1986	Roberto; 1969	Hail to Reason	Nothirdchance
Sire Lear Fan (USA) 1986	Roberto; 1969	Bramalea	Nashua
Sire Lear Fan (USA) 1986	Roberto; 1969	Bramalea	Rarelea
Sire Lear Fan (USA) 1986	Wac; 1969	Lt Stevens	Nantallah
Sire Lear Fan (USA) 1986	Wac; 1969	Lt Stevens	Rough Shod (GB)
Sire Lear Fan (USA) 1986	Wac; 1969	Belthazar	War Admiral
Sire Lear Fan (USA) 1986	Wac; 1969	Belthazar	Blinking Owl
Dam Small Timer (USA) 1980	Lyphard; 1969	Northern Dancer (CAN)	Nearctic
Dam Small Timer (USA) 1980	Lyphard; 1969	Northern Dancer (CAN)	Natalma (USA)
Dam Small Timer (USA) 1980	Lyphard; 1969	Goofed	Court Martial (GB)
Dam Small Timer (USA) 1980	Lyphard; 1969	Goofed	Barra (FR)
Dam Small Timer (USA) 1980	Watch Fob; 1965	Tompion	Tom Fool
Dam Small Timer (USA) 1980	Watch Fob; 1965	Tompion	Sunlight
Dam Small Timer (USA) 1980	Watch Fob; 1965	Pet Child	Revoked
Dam Small Timer (USA) 1980	Watch Fob; 1965	Pet Child	White Lady (Family: 4-m)
