= Premio Ribot =

- Class: Group 3
- Location: Capannelle Racecourse; Rome, Italy
- Race type: Flat / Thoroughbred
- Website: Capannelle

Race information
- Distance: 1,600 metres (1 mile)
- Surface: Turf
- Track: Right-handed
- Qualification: Three-years-old and up
- Weight: 57½ kg (3yo); 58 kg (4yo+); Allowances; 1½ kg for fillies and mares Penalties; 2 kg for Group 1 winners * 1 kg for Group 2 winners * * since January 1
- Purse: 77,000 (2015); 1st: €40,375

The Premio Ribot is a Group 3 flat horse race in Italy open to thoroughbreds aged three years or older. It is run at Capannelle over a distance 1,600 metres (about 1 mile), and it is scheduled to take place each year in late October or early November.

The event is named after Ribot, a successful Italian-trained racehorse in the mid-1950s. It was given Group 2 status in the 1970s. It was downgraded to Group 3 from 2015.

The Premio Ribot was usually held on the first or second Sunday in November and staged on the same day as the Premio Roma. Since 2015 it has been held a week earlier than usual, at the same meeting as the Premio Lydia Tesio.

== Records ==
Most successful horse:

- no horse has won this race more than once since 1976

Leading jockey since 1982 (4 wins):

- Dario Vargiu - Duca d'Atri (2003), Porsenna (2014), Greg Pass (2016), Out of Time (2019)

Leading trainer since 1982 (4 wins):

- Endo Botti – Kaspersky (2015), Fulminix (2020), Mr Darcy (2024), Kabir (2025)

== Winners since 1982 ==
Year	Winner	Age	Jockey	Trainer	Time
1982	Commodore Blake	5	Walter Swinburn	Michael Stoute	1:45.60
1983	Nandino	3	Bruce Raymond	Antonio Aiello	1:37.90
1984	King of Clubs	3	Paul Cook	Ian Balding	1:44.00
1985	Laura Knight	4	Marco Paganini	Mario Vincis	1:44.30
1986	Lucky Ring	4	Willie Carson	Dick Hern	1:35.50
1987	Patriach	5	John Reid	John Dunlop	1:39.40
1988	Miswaki Tern	3	Gérald Mossé	François Boutin	1:38.50
1989	Tibullo ^{[a]}	4	Gianfranco Dettori	Luca Cumani	1:41.60
1990	Sikeston	4	Michael Roberts	Clive Brittain	1:44.60
1991	Misil	3	Gianfranco Dettori	Vittorio Caruso	1:42.70
1992	Stubass	3	Santiago Soto	Alduino Botti	1:42.40
1993	Alhijaz	4	Willie Carson	John Dunlop	1:41.70
1994	Pater Noster	5	Paul Eddery	Julie Cecil	1:41.20
1995	Welsh Liberty	6	Armando Corniani	David Ducci	1:36.50
1996	Taxi de Nuit	4	Frankie Dettori	Alberto Verdesi	1:35.30
1997	Crimson Tide	3	Richard Hills	John Hills	1:40.60
1998	Midyan Call	4	Otello Fancera	Ovidio Pessi	1:37.00
1999	Oriental Fashion	3	Frankie Dettori	Saeed bin Suroor	1:42.70
2000	Dane Friendly	4	Mirco Demuro	Ovidio Pessi	1:44.00
2001	Giovane Imperatore	3	Maurizio Pasquale	Lorenzo Brogi	1:39.70
2002	Altieri	4	Frankie Dettori	Vittorio Caruso	1:38.90
2003	Duca d'Atri	4	Dario Vargiu	Armando Renzoni	1:37.10
2004	Eagle Rise	4	Andreas Suborics	Andreas Schütz	1:37.30
2005	Distant Way	4	Maurizio Pasquale	Lorenzo Brogi	1:40.00
2006	Ramonti	4	Edmondo Botti	Alduino Botti	1:35.40
2007	Santiago	5	Edmondo Botti	Hans Blume	1:38.00
2008	Pressing	5	Michael Kinane	Michael Jarvis	1:39.80
2009	Silver Arrow	4	Carlo Fiocchi	Riccardo Menichetti	1:43.20
2010	Worthadd	3	Mirco Demuro	Vittorio Caruso	1:35.80
2011	Vanjura	4	Alexander Pietsch	Roland Dzubasz	1:37.80
2012	King Air	5	Stéphane Pasquier	Rupert Pritchard-Gordon	1:39.03
2013	Saint Bernard	4	Gabriele Bietolini	Daniele Camuffo	1:35.17
2014	Porsenna	4	Dario Vargiu	Stefano Botti	1:36.00
2015	Kaspersky	4	Umberto Rispoli	Endo Botti	1:37.90
2016	Greg Pass	4	Dario Vargiu	Il Cavallo In Testa	1:39.00
2017	Time To Choose	4	Fabio Branca	Stefano Botti	1:36.10
2018	Masham Star	4	Joe Fanning	Mark Johnston	1:46.25
2019	Out of Time	3	Dario Vargiu	Alduino Botti	1:38.00
2020	Fulminix	5	Dario Di Tocco	Endo Botti	1:35.33
2021	Cantocorale	3	Fabio Branca	Grizzetti Galoppo SRL	1:39.13
2022	Rubaiyat	5	Clement Lecoeuvre	Henk Grewe	1:35.65
2023	Westminster Night	4	Rene Piechulek	A Wohler	1:37.70
2024	Mr Darcy	3	Salvatore Sulas	Endo Botti	1:37.60
2025	Kabir	3	Alessio Satta	Endo Botti	1:35.20

^{a} Mirror Black finished first in 1989, but he was relegated to third place following a stewards' inquiry.

== Earlier winners ==
- 1976: Ovac
- 1977: Isabella Moretti
- 1978: Capo Bon
- 1979: Costly Wave
- 1980: Peloponnes
- 1981: Vargas Llosa

== See also ==
- List of Italian flat horse races
