= Gran Criterium =

Flat horse race in Italy

- Class: Group 3
- Location: San Siro Racecourse; Milan, Italy
- Race type: Flat / Thoroughbred
- Website: San Siro

Race information
- Distance: 1,500 metres
- Surface: Turf
- Track: Right-handed
- Qualification: Two-year-olds excluding geldings
- Weight: 56 kg Allowances; 1½ kg for fillies
- Purse: €275,000 (2016); 1st: €80,750

The Gran Criterium is a Group 3 flat horse race in Italy open to two-year-old thoroughbred Colt (horse) entire colts only . It is run at Milan over a distance of 1,500 metres (slightly under 1 mile), and it is scheduled to take place each year in October.

The event held Group 2 status for a period in the 1970s. It was subsequently promoted, and was Italy's only Group 1 race for juvenile horses. It was downgraded back to Group 2 from 2014. It was downgraded to Group 3 from 2025.

== Records ==
Leading jockey since 1970 (6 wins):

- Gianfranco Dettori – Gay Lussac (1971), El Muleta (1977), Stouci (1978), Pareo (1979), Anguillo (1982), Sikeston (1988)

Leading trainer since 1980 (4 wins):

- John Dunlop – Sanam (1986), Sikeston (1988), Alhijaz (1991), Hello (1996)
- Alduino Botti - Anguillo (1982), Will Dancer (1984), Mission Boy (2018), Vis A Vis (2020)

Leading owner since 1980 (3 wins):

- Prince A. A. Faisal – Sanam (1986), Alhijaz (1991), Nayarra (2011)

== Winners since 1980 ==
Year	Winner	Jockey	Trainer	Owner	Time
1980	Glint of Gold	John Matthias	Ian Balding	Paul Mellon	1:44.00
1981	Grease	Antonio di Nardo	Gaetano Benetti	Antonio Boesso	1:44.80
1982	Anguillo	Gianfranco Dettori	Alduino Botti	Scuderia Cieffedi	1:43.40
1983	Northern Tempest	Walter Swinburn	Michael Stoute	Sheikh Mohammed	1:38.20
1984	Will Dancer	Sergio Fancera	Alduino Botti	Scuderia Siba	1:40.80
1985	Tanque Verde	Steve Cauthen	Frank Turner	Scuderia Beta	1:40.70
1986	Sanam	Willie Carson	John Dunlop	Prince A. A. Faisal	1:39.90
1987	Tibullo	Marco Paganini	G. Maggi	Scuderia Cieffedi	1:47.10
1988	Sikeston	Gianfranco Dettori	John Dunlop	Allevamento White Star	1:44.20
1989	Candy Glen	Guy Guignard	Chris Wall	Antonio Balzarini	1:39.10
1990	Steamer Duck	Guy Guignard	Criquette Head	Maktoum Al Maktoum	1:47.70
1991	Alhijaz	Lester Piggott	John Dunlop	Prince A. A. Faisal	1:42.40
1992	Pelder	Santiago Soto	Luciano d'Auria	Lady M Stable	1:47.60
1993	Torrismondo	Richard Quinn	Paul Cole	9th Viscount Portman	1:50.70
1994	Golden Glenstal	Mario Esposito	Giuliano Fratini	Scuderia Golden Horse	1:48.00
1995	Glory of Dancer	Olivier Peslier	Fabio Brogi	Scuderia General Horse	1:39.10
1996	Hello	Fernando Jovine	John Dunlop	Philip Wroughton	1:44.60
1997	Lend a Hand	Jason Weaver	Mark Johnston	Maktoum Al Maktoum	1:37.20
1998	Noble Pearl	Stephen Davies	Wilfried Kujath	Stall Haferkasten	1:43.30
1999	Night Style	Gary Carter	Ed Dunlop	Mohammed Jaber	1:37.30
2000	Count Dubois	Basil Marcus	William Haggas	Wentworth Racing Ltd	1:44.70
2001	Sholokhov	Michael Kinane	Aidan O'Brien	Magnier / Tabor	1:45.80
2002	Spartacus	Michael Kinane	Aidan O'Brien	Sue Magnier	1:44.50
2003	Pearl of Love	Darryll Holland	Mark Johnston	Mick Doyle	1:40.10
2004	Königstiger	Filip Minařík	Peter Schiergen	Gestüt Schlenderhan	1:42.30
2005	Lateral	William Mongil	Peter Schiergen	Gestüt Fährhof	1:42.70
2006	Kirklees	Frankie Dettori	Mark Johnston	Sheikh Mohammed	1:39.90
2007	Scintillo	Ryan Moore	Richard Hannon Sr.	White Beech Farm	1:38.20
2008	no race ^{[a]}
2009	Hearts of Fire	Olivier Peslier	Pat Eddery	Pat Eddery Racing	1:38.90
2010	Biondetti	Ahmed Ajtebi	Mahmood Al Zarooni	Godolphin	1:41.50
2011	Nayarra	Martin Dwyer	Mick Channon	Prince A. A. Faisal	1:35.70
2012	Law Enforcement	Stéphane Pasquier	Richard Hannon Sr.	M. S. Al Shahi	1:37.10
2013	Priore Philip	Umberto Rispoli	Stefano Botti	Scuderia Ste Ma	1:36.60
2014	Hero Look	Fabio Branca	Stefano Botti	Scuderia Effevi	1:38.40
2015	Biz Heart	Carlo Fiocchi	Stefano Botti	We Bloodstock Srl	1:46.00
2016	Skarino Gold	Michael Cadeddu	Jean-Pierre Carvalho	Phoenix Stable	1:33.00
2017	Royal Youmzain	Eduardo Pedroza	Andreas Wöhler	Jaber Abdullah	1:34.00
2018	Mission Boy	Carlo Fiocchi	Alduino Botti	Scuderia Blueberry SRL	1:33.90
2019	Rubaiyat	Clement Lecoeuvre	Henk Grewe	Darius Racing	1:36.40
2020	Vis A Vis	Fabio Branca	Alduino Botti	Stefano Botti	1:37.50
2021	Don Chicco^{[b]}	Claudio Colombi	Agostino Affe'	Luigi Colasanti	1:38.50
2022	Vero Atleta	Dario Vargiu	Grizzetti Galoppo	Scuderia Incolinx & Diego Romeo	1:42.80
2023	Wintertraum	Martin Seidl	Waldemar Hickst	Stall Lucky Owner	1:41.80
2024	Lazio	Bauyrzhan Murzabayev	Waldemar Hickst	Stall Lucky Owner	1:43.90
2025	Gaga Mate	Billy Loughnane	George Scott	Victorious Forever	1:33.00

^{a} The 2008 running was cancelled because of a strike.
^{b} The 2021 races took place at Capannelle.

== Earlier winners ==
- 1925: Scopello
- 1926: Francavilla
- 1927: Erba
- 1928: Aruntius
- 1929: Gerard
- 1930: Alena
- 1931: Jacopa del Sellaio
- 1932: Dossa Dossi
- 1933: Osimo
- 1934: Fiume
- 1935: Archidamia
- 1936: Donatello
- 1937: Nearco
- 1938: Bautta
- 1939: Sabla
- 1940: Niccolo dell'Arca
- 1941: Donatella
- 1943: Liston
- 1944: Accorta
- 1945: Campiello
- 1946: Este
- 1947: Trevisana
- 1948: Mignard
- 1949: Stigliano
- 1950: Daumier
- 1951: Arson
- 1952: Dacia
- 1953: Orvieto
- 1954: Ribot
- 1955: Hidalgo
- 1956: Antony
- 1957: Pier Capponi
- 1958: Rio Marin
- 1959: Marguerite Vernaut
- 1960: Molvedo
- 1961: Olimpio
- 1962: Vinteuil
- 1963: Crylor
- 1964: Tadolina
- 1965: Prince Tady
- 1966: Amynthas
- 1967: Caspoggio
- 1968: Toupet
- 1969: Viani
- 1970: Lascro
- 1971: Gay Lussac
- 1972: New Model
- 1973: Anquetil
- 1974: Start
- 1975: Northern Spring
- 1976: Sirlad
- 1977: El Muleta
- 1978: Stouci
- 1979: Pareo

== See also ==
- List of Italian flat horse races
