= Premio Parioli =

Flat horse race in Italy

Premio Parioli (Italian 2,000 Guineas)
- Class: Group 3
- Location: Capannelle Racecourse; Rome, Italy
- Inaugurated: 1907
- Race type: Flat / Thoroughbred
- Sponsor: Shadwell Racing
- Website: Capannelle

Race information
- Distance: 1,600 metres (1 mile)
- Surface: Turf
- Track: Right-handed
- Qualification: Three-year-old colts
- Weight: 58 kg
- Purse: €106,768 (2020); 1st: €59,316

The Premio Parioli is a Group 3 flat horse race in Italy open to three-year-old thoroughbred colts. It is run over a distance of 1,600 metres (about 1 mile) at Capannelle in April.

It is Italy's equivalent of the 2000 Guineas, a famous race in England.

== History ==
The event is named after Parioli, an area of Rome to the north of the racecourse. It was established in 1907, and the inaugural running was won by Gostaco.

The race was originally open to both colts and fillies. The first filly to win was Wistaria in 1910, and the last was Saccaroa in 1950.

For a period the Premio Parioli held Group 1 status. It was downgraded to Group 2 level in 1996, and to Group 3 in 2007.

The Premio Parioli is currently run on the same day as its fillies' counterpart, the Premio Regina Elena.

== Records ==
Leading jockey (5 wins):

- Paolo Caprioli – Lauco (1924), Varedo (1927), Nogara (1931), Crapom (1933), Archidamia (1936)

Leading trainer (13 wins):

- Federico Tesio – Guido Reni (1911), Burne Jones (1918), Canova (1919), Delleana (1928), Nogara (1931), Jacopa del Sellaio (1932), Bernina (1934), Niccolo da Foligno (1935), Nearco (1938), Niccolo dell'Arca (1941), Simone da Bologna (1943), Astolfina (1948), Botticelli (1954)

Leading owner (12 wins): (includes part ownership)

- Federico Tesio – Guido Reni (1911), Burne Jones (1918), Canova (1919), Delleana (1928), Nogara (1931), Jacopa del Sellaio (1932), Bernina (1934), Niccolo da Foligno (1935), Nearco (1938), Niccolo dell'Arca (1941), Astolfina (1948), Botticelli (1954)

- The twelve winners owned by Federico Tesio include six owned outright, three owned by Tesio-Incisa and three by Razza Dormello-Olgiata.
- Razza Dormello-Olgiata, founded by Tesio, owned four more winners after his death in 1954.

== Winners since 1985 ==
Year	Winner	Jockey	Trainer	Owner	Time
1985	Again Tomorrow	Michael Kinane	Dermot Weld	Moyglare Stud Farm	1:40.20
1986	Svelt	Jacques Heloury	Alduino Botti	Scuderia Rencati
1987	Lucratif	Paul Cook	Ian Balding	Mrs J. A. McDougald	1:39.90
1988	Gay Burslem	Michael Kinane	Dermot Weld	Michael Smurfit	1:43.40
1989	Sikeston	Gianfranco Dettori	John Dunlop	Allevamento White Star	1:41.10
1990	Candy Glen	Gary W. Moore	Chris Wall	Antonio Balzarini	1:38.60
1991	Misil	Gianfranco Dettori	Vittorio Caruso	Scuderia Laghi	1:41.30
1992	Alhijaz	Willie Carson	John Dunlop	Prince A. A. Faisal	1:39.90
1993	Pelder	Santiago Soto	Luciano d'Auria	Lady M Stable	1:41.30
1994	Poliuto	Fernando Jovine	Lorenzo Brogi	Scuderia Cieffedi	1:39.10
1995	Prince Arthur	John Reid	Peter Chapple-Hyam	Michael Tabor	1:38.50
1996	Dancer Mitral	Vincenzo Mezzatesta	Lorenzo Brogi	All. La Nuova Sbarra	1:40.60
1997	Air Express	Brett Doyle	Clive Brittain	Mohamed Obaida	1:39.50
1998	Crisos Il Monaco (Note: Trans Island finished first in 1998, but he was relegated to second place following a stewards' inquiry)	Vincenzo Mezzatesta	Luigi Camici	Luciano Biancolini	1:37.20
1999	Alabama Jacks	Massimiliano Tellini	Kevin Prendergast	James McEvoy	1:40.70
2000	Davide Umbro	Sergio Dettori	Emanuele Russo	Scuderia Colle Papa	1:39.00
2001	Giovane Imperatore	Maurizio Pasquale	Lorenzo Brogi	All. La Nuova Sbarra	1:37.50
2002	Dupont	Darryll Holland	William Haggas	Wentworth Racing Ltd	1:37.80
2003	Le Vie dei Colori	Dario Vargiu	Roberto Brogi	Scuderia Archi Romani	1:40.20
2004	Spirit of Desert	Maurizio Pasquale	Lorenzo Brogi	All. La Nuova Sbarra	1:41.20
2005	Ramonti	Edmondo Botti	Alduino Botti	Scuderia Antezzate	1:36.60
2006	Rattle and Hum	Stefano Landi	Luigi Camici	Scuderia San Valentino	1:36.90
2007	Golden Titus	Stefano Landi	Armando Renzoni	Scuderia Millennium	1:39.30
2008	Senlis	Alberto Sanna	Emilio Borromeo	Scuderia Pieffegi	1:38.10
2009	Libano	Marco Monteriso	Luigi Polito	Scuderia Lucrezia	1:39.80
2010	Worthadd	Mirco Demuro	Vittorio Caruso	Scuderia Incolinx	1:38.90
2011	Al Rep (Note: The 2011 winner Al Rep was later exported to Hong Kong and renamed Packing Whiz)	Salvatore Sulas	Daniele Camuffo	Scuderia Colle Papa	1:38.10
2012	Malossol	Fabio Branca	Giuseppe Botti	Selim Blanga Moghrabi	1:38.50
2013	Best Tango	Umberto Rispoli	Gianluca Bietolini	Elia Tanghetti	1:38.40
2014	Salford Secret	Djorde Perovic	Riccardo Santini	Carlo Lanfranchi	1:39.63
2015	Hero Look	Fabio Branca	Stefano Botti	Scuderia Effevi	1:39.80
2016	Poetta Diletto	Andrea Atzeni	Stefano Botti	Scuderia Blueberry	1:35.80
2017	Anda Muchacho	Dario Vargiu	Il Cavallo In Testa	Incolinx / Romeo	1:36.60
2018	Wait Forever	Dario Vargiu	A Botti	Scuderia Effevi	1:35.60
2019	Out Of Time	Andrea Atzeni	A Botti	Scuderia Del Giglio Sardo	1:34.90
2020	Cima Emergency (Note: The 2020 race was run in June due to the COVID-19 pandemic in Italy)	Gérald Mossé	Grizzetti Galoppo	Scuderia Cocktail	1:36.00
2021	Fayathaan	Alberto Sanna	Roberto Biondi	Luigi Roveda	1:38.00
2022	See Hector	Alberto Sanna	Henk Grewe	Cometica Ag	1:36.10
2023	Vero Atleta	Frankie Dettori	Grizzetti Galoppo	Scuderia Incolinx & Diego Romeo	1:37.50
2024	Melfi	Dario Di Tocco	Endo Botti	Chelsea Srls	1:35.30
2025	Lao Tzu	Maikol Arras	Stefano Botti	Stefano Botti	1:35.50
2026	Grand Son Of Dark	Alessio Satta	Endo Botti	Fabio Manservigi	1:35.40

== Earlier winners ==
- 1907: Gostaco
- 1908: Demetrio
- 1909: Frack
- 1910: Wistaria
- 1911: Guido Reni
- 1912: Makufa
- 1913: Nettuno
- 1914: Chumvi
- 1915: Aquilone
- 1916: Idolo
- 1917: Alcione
- 1918: Burne Jones *
- 1919: Canova
- 1920: Vespisedda
- 1921: Torcicollo
- 1922: Fiorello
- 1923: Rapido
- 1924: Lauco
- 1925: Ansac
- 1926: Toce
- 1927: Varedo
- 1928: Delleana
- 1929: Zuho
- 1930: Manganello
- 1931: Nogara
- 1932: Jacopa del Sellaio
- 1933: Crapom
- 1934: Bernina
- 1935: Niccolo da Foligno
- 1936: Archidamia
- 1937: Sinni
- 1938: Nearco
- 1939: Vello
- 1940: Jesolo
- 1941: Niccolo dell'Arca
- 1942: Brignano
- 1943: Simone da Bologna
- 1944: Macherio
- 1945: no race
- 1946: Gladiolo
- 1947: Zaratustra
- 1948: Astolfina
- 1949: Zagarolo
- 1950: Saccaroa
- 1951: Morengo
- 1952: Marcantonio
- 1953: Alberigo
- 1954: Botticelli
- 1955: Vasco de Gama
- 1956: Magabit
- 1957: Gioviano
- 1958: Peveron
- 1959: Vestro
- 1960: Asopo
- 1961: Adrasto
- 1962: Aernen
- 1963: Haseltine
- 1964: Crivelli
- 1965: Bauto
- 1966: Ciacolesso
- 1967: Raeburn
- 1968: Over
- 1969: Bonconte di Montefeltro
- 1970: Antelio
- 1971: Arnaldo da Brescia
- 1972: Fernet
- 1973: Bahadir
- 1974: Mannsfeld
- 1975: Start
- 1976: Ovac
- 1977: Capo Bon
- 1978: Fatusael
- 1979: Good Times
- 1980: Red Rocket
- 1981: Timur Lang
- 1982: Sorabancies
- 1983: Drumalis
- 1984: Southern Arrow

* The 1918 running took place at Milan.

== See also ==
- List of Italian flat horse races
