= Premio Regina Elena =

Flat horse race in Italy

Premio Regina Elena (Italian 1,000 Guineas)
- Class: Group 3
- Location: Capannelle Racecourse; Rome, Italy
- Inaugurated: 1907
- Race type: Flat / Thoroughbred
- Sponsor: Shadwell Racing
- Website: Capannelle

Race information
- Distance: 1,600 metres (1 mile)
- Surface: Turf
- Track: Right-handed
- Qualification: Three-year-old fillies
- Weight: 56 kg
- Purse: €106,768 (2020); 1st: €59,316

The Premio Regina Elena is a Group 3 flat horse race in Italy open to three-year-old thoroughbred fillies. It is run over a distance of 1,600 metres (about 1 mile) at Capannelle in April or May.

It is Italy's equivalent of the 1000 Guineas, a famous race in England.

== History ==
The event is named after Elena of Montenegro, who became Queen of Italy when her husband acceded to the throne in 1900. It was established in 1907, and the inaugural running was won by Madree.

The title of the race was shortened to Premio Elena in 1943. It reverted to its original name in 1965.

For a period the Premio Regina Elena held Group 1 status. It was downgraded to Group 2 level in 1988, and to Group 3 in 2007.

Several winners of the Premio Regina Elena have gone on to win the Oaks d'Italia. The first was Makufa in 1912, and the most recent was Cherry Collect in 2012.

The race is currently run on the same day as its colts' counterpart, the Premio Parioli.

== Records ==
Leading jockey (6 wins):

- Enrico Camici – Astolfina (1948), Giambellina (1954), Theodorica (1955), Angela Rucellai (1957), Rossellina (1960), Tadolina (1965)
- Sergio Fancera – Anticlea (1963), Brioche (1968), Azzurrina (1978), Martin's Girl (1979), Right Bank (1983), Miss Gris (1985)

Leading trainer since 1985 (6 wins):

- Bruno Grizzetti – Shenck (1999), Xua (2000), Sadowa (2002), Rumba Loca (2004), Lokaloka (2007), Stay Alive (2011)

Leading owner (16 wins): (includes part ownership)

- Federico Tesio – Veronesa (1908), Angelica Kauffmann (1909), Claudia Lorena (1915), Gianpietrina (1917), Duccia di Buoninsegna (1923), Gherarda delle Notti (1926), Delleana (1928), Nannoccia (1930), Nogara (1931), Jacopa del Sellaio (1932), Dossa Dossi (1933), Bernina (1934), Dagherotipia (1939), Tokamura (1943), Astolfina (1948), Giambellina (1954)

- The sixteen winners owned by Federico Tesio include eleven owned outright, three owned by Tesio-Incisa and two by Razza Dormello-Olgiata.
- Razza Dormello-Olgiata, founded by Tesio, owned six more winners after his death in 1954.

== Winners since 1985 ==
Year	Winner	Jockey	Trainer	Owner	Time
1985	Miss Gris	Sergio Fancera	Alduino Botti	Scuderia Siba	1:38.50
1986	Danzica	Willie Carson	Emilio Borromeo	Emilio Borromeo	1:40.80
1987	Fedora Grey	Gianfranco Dettori	Alduino Botti	Scuderia Siba	1:40.30
1988	Lonely Bird	Luca Sorrentino	Emilio Borromeo	The Green Valley SRL	1:43.90
1989	Miss Secreto	Steve Cauthen	John Dunlop	Allevamento White Star	1:42.10
1990	Atoll	Gary W. Moore	Barry Hills	Antonio Balzarini	1:42.90
1991	Arranvanna	Eddie Maple	Armando Renzoni	Antonio Balzarini	1:42.60
1992	Treasure Hope	Willie Supple	Jim Bolger	Carlo Bascape	1:38.50
1993	Ancestral Dancer	Michael Hills	Michael Bell	Innlaw Racing	1:39.90
1994	Erin Bird	Edmondo Botti	Giuseppe Botti	Scuderia Siba	1:40.00
1995	Olimpia Dukakis	Giovanni Forte	Giuseppe Botti	Scuderia Siba	1:39.10
1996	Beauty to Petriolo	Maurizio Pasquale	Luigi Camici	Scuderia Ri-Ma	1:39.30
1997	Nicole Pharly	Frankie Dettori	Alberto Verdesi	Scuderia Blue Horse	1:39.10
1998	Sopran Londa	Mirco Demuro	Luigi Camici	Az. Agricola San Uberto	1:42.40
1999	Shenck	Sylvain Guillot	Bruno Grizzetti	Scuderia Il Poggio	1:43.60
2000	Xua	Massimiliano Tellini	Bruno Grizzetti	Scuderia Sagittario	1:40.00
2001	Bugia	Maurizio Pasquale	Lorenzo Brogi	Scuderia Nordovest	1:38.50
2002	Sadowa	Mirco Demuro	Bruno Grizzetti	Scuderia Blueberry	1:38.50
2003	Golden Nepi	Dario Vargiu	Giuliano Fratini	Scuderia Golden Horse	1:40.20
2004	Rumba Loca	Dario Vargiu	Bruno Grizzetti	Mack Ferrer SRL	1:42.60
2005	Silver Cup	Marco Monteriso	Alduino Botti	Martin Schwartz	1:37.20
2006	Windhuk	Stefano Landi	Pierluigi Giannotti	Pierluigi Giannotti	1:37.00
2007	Lokaloka	Dario Vargiu	Bruno Grizzetti	Razza del Terminillo	1:35.80
2008	Love of Dubai	Darryll Holland	Clive Brittain	Mohammed Al Shafar	1:37.10
2009	My Sweet Baby	Carlo Fiocchi	Riccardo Menichetti	Razza dell'Olmo	1:38.30
2010	Evading Tempete	Jean-Bernard Eyquem	François Rohaut	Mouknass / Forde	1:38.30
2011	Stay Alive	Dario Vargiu	Bruno Grizzetti	Scuderia Vittadini	1:39.60
2012	Cherry Collect	Fabio Branca	Stefano Botti	Scuderia Effevi	1:38.00
2013	Dancer Destination	Dario Vargiu	Bruno Grizzetti	Scuderia Blueberry	1:37.96
2014	Vague Nouvelle	Mirco Demuro	Raffaele Biondi	Incolix	1:42.52
2015	Sound Of Freedom	Cristian Demuro	Stefano Botti	Scuderia Effevi	1:38.20
2016	Conselice	Silvano Mulas	Stefano Botti	Stefano Botti	1:36.40
2017	Mi Raccomando	Fabio Branca	Stefano Botti	Scuderia Effevi	1:36.10
2018	Act Of War	Antonio Fresu	Endo Botti	Dioscuri	1:36.60
2019	Fullness Of Life	Gerald Mosse	A Botti	Scuderia New Age	1:35.90
2020	Granatina (Note: The 2020 race was run in June due to the COVID-19 pandemic in Italy)	Pasquale Borrelli	Andrea Renzi	Fabio Antonini	1:36.60
2021	Wakanaka	Luca Maniezzi	Diego Dettori	S Dettori & A R Maccioni	1:37.20
2022	Swipe Up	Claudio Colombi	E. C. Racing Stables	Scuderia Sagam Srls	1:35.40
2023	Shavasana	Cristian Demuro	Stefano Botti	Mario Sansoni	1:37.60
2024	Beenham	Germano Marcelli	Fabio Boccardelli	Matteo Belluscio	1:36.10
2025	Klaynn	Dario Di Tocco	Endo Botti	Sandro Cardaioli	1:35.10
2026	Just Call Me Angel	Jason Hart	Ed Dunlop	Cayton Park Stud Limited	1:36.60

== Earlier winners ==
- 1907: Madree
- 1908: Veronesa
- 1909: Angelica Kauffmann
- 1910: La Matchiche
- 1911: Androclea
- 1912: Makufa
- 1913: Sigma
- 1914: Ten
- 1915: Claudia Lorena
- 1916: Vanetta
- 1917: Gianpietrina
- 1918: Ardea *
- 1919: Alcimaca
- 1920: Alciope
- 1921: Ellera
- 1922: Fraschetta
- 1923: Duccia di Buoninsegna
- 1924: Pomella
- 1925: Bilitis
- 1926: Gherarda delle Notti
- 1927: Maja
- 1928: Delleana
- 1929: Arcibella
- 1930: Nannoccia
- 1931: Nogara
- 1932: Jacopa del Sellaio
- 1933: Dossa Dossi
- 1934: Bernina
- 1935: Colibri
- 1936: Archidamia
- 1937: Amerina
- 1938: Brunellesca
- 1939: Dagherotipia
- 1940: Peruviana
- 1941: Beatrice
- 1942: Venere
- 1943: Tokamura
- 1944: Dalmazia *
- 1945: no race
- 1946: Odola
- 1947: Zambra
- 1948: Astolfina
- 1949: Meda
- 1950: Saccaroa
- 1951: Baronessa
- 1952: Sannita
- 1953: Mezzegra
- 1954: Giambellina
- 1955: Theodorica
- 1956: Moleca
- 1957: Angela Rucellai
- 1958: Algaiola
- 1959: Cesaproba
- 1960: Rossellina
- 1961: Ninabella
- 1962: Alibella
- 1963: Anticlea
- 1964: Bronzina
- 1965: Tadolina
- 1966: Alhambra
- 1967: Dolina
- 1968: Brioche
- 1969: Volsini
- 1970: Alea
- 1971: Adelaide Adams
- 1972: Kerkenna
- 1973: La Zanzara
- 1974: Grande Nube
- 1975: Synthesis
- 1976: Dir el Gobi
- 1977: Roman Blue
- 1978: Azzurrina
- 1979: Martin's Girl
- 1980: Tibalda
- 1981: Val d'Erica
- 1982: Rosananti
- 1983: Right Bank
- 1984: Honey

* The race took place at Milan in 1918 and 1944.

== See also ==
- List of Italian flat horse races
