= Premio Vittorio di Capua =

Flat horse race in Italy

- Class: Group 2
- Location: San Siro Racecourse; Milan, Italy
- Race type: Flat / Thoroughbred
- Website: San Siro

Race information
- Distance: 1,600 metres (1 mile)
- Surface: Turf
- Track: Right-handed
- Qualification: Three-years-old and up
- Weight: 56 kg (3yo); 58 kg (4yo+); Allowances; 1½ kg for fillies and mares
- Purse: €275,000 (2016); 1st: €80,750

The Premio Vittorio di Capua is a Group 2 flat horse race in Italy open to thoroughbreds aged three years or older. It is run at Milan over a distance of 1,600 metres (about 1 mile), and it is scheduled to take place each year in September or October.

The event is named in memory of Vittorio di Capua, a former president of San Siro Racecourse, who was kidnapped and murdered in the 1970s.

For several years the Premio Vittorio di Capua held Group 2 status. It was promoted to Group 1 level in 1988 and downgraded back to Group 2 in 2017.

== Records ==
Most successful horse since 1980 (2 wins):

- Sikeston – 1990, 1991
- Alhijaz – 1992, 1993
- Slickly – 2001, 2002
- Out Of Time - 2019, 2020

Leading jockey since 1980 (5 wins):

- Frankie Dettori – Muhtathir (1999), Slickly (2001, 2002), Ancient World (2004), Rio de la Plata (2010)

Leading trainer since 1980 (6 wins):

- Saeed bin Suroor – Muhtathir (1999), Slickly (2001, 2002), Ancient World (2004), Gladiatorus (2009), Rio de la Plata (2010)

Leading owner since 1980 (6 wins):

- Godolphin – Muhtathir (1999), Slickly (2001, 2002), Ancient World (2004), Gladiatorus (2009), Rio de la Plata (2010)

== Winners since 1988 ==
Year	Winner	Age	Jockey	Trainer	Owner	Time
1988	Jurado	5	Gianfranco Dettori	Alduino Botti	Scuderia Siba	1:37.90
1989	Just a Flutter	5	Michael Roberts	Heinz Jentzsch	Gestüt Ittlingen	1:37.30
1990	Sikeston	4	Michael Roberts	Clive Brittain	Luciano Gaucci	1:44.10
1991	Sikeston	5	Michael Roberts	Clive Brittain	Luciano Gaucci	1:43.30
1992	Alhijaz	3	Willie Carson	John Dunlop	Prince A. A. Faisal	1:46.10
1993	Alhijaz	4	Willie Carson	John Dunlop	Prince A. A. Faisal	1:47.90
1994	Port Lucaya	4	Kevin Darley	David Loder	Lucayan Stud	1:49.70
1995	Nicolotte	4	Michael Hills	Geoff Wragg	Mollers Racing	1:39.60
1996	Mistle Cat	6	Richard Hughes	Sean Woods	Peter Chu	1:40.30
1997	Devil River Peek	5	Andrasch Starke	Bruno Schütz	Stall Hoppegarten	1:36.30
1998	Waky Nao	5	Andrasch Starke	Andreas Schütz	Helmut von Finck	1:45.40
1999	Muhtathir	4	Frankie Dettori	Saeed bin Suroor	Godolphin	1:35.20
2000	Faberger	4	L. Hammer-Hansen	Erika Mäder	Gestüt Etzean	1:42.00
2001	Slickly	5	Frankie Dettori	Saeed bin Suroor	Godolphin	1:40.50
2002	Slickly	6	Frankie Dettori	Saeed bin Suroor	Godolphin	1:42.30
2003	Le Vie dei Colori	3	Dario Vargiu	Roberto Brogi	Scuderia Archi Romani	1:38.20
2004	Ancient World	4	Frankie Dettori	Saeed bin Suroor	Godolphin	1:37.80
2005	Anna Monda	3	Torsten Mundry	Peter Rau	Teruya Yoshida	1:41.10
2006	Ramonti	4	Edmondo Botti	Alduino Botti	Scuderia Antezzate	1:37.80
2007	Linngari	5	Jimmy Fortune	Alain de Royer-Dupré	Peter Walichnowski	1:37.50
2008	no race ^{[a]}
2009	Gladiatorus	4	Ahmed Ajtebi	Saeed bin Suroor	Godolphin	1:38.00
2010	Rio de la Plata	5	Frankie Dettori	Saeed bin Suroor	Godolphin	1:38.20
2011	Dick Turpin	4	Christophe Soumillon	Richard Hannon Sr.	John Manley	1:33.20
2012	Amaron	3	Mirco Demuro	Andreas Löwe	Gestüt Winterhauch	1:39.70
2013	Shamalgan	6	Maxime Guyon	Xavier T. Demeaulte	Ardak Amirkulov	1:35.10
2014	Priore Philip	3	Dario Vargiu	Stefano Botti	Scuderia Ste Ma	1:36.50
2015	Red Dubawi	7	Andreas Suborics	Erika Mader	Zilam Bifov	1:36.90
2016	Waikika	5	Gérald Mossé	Yann Barberot	Philippe Bellaiche	1:34.00
2017	Amore Hass^{[b]}	3	Cristian Demuro	Stefano Botti	Scuderia Rencati Srl	1:37.40
2018	Anda Muchacho	4	Fabio Branca	Nicolo Simondi	Scuderia Incolinx & Diego Romeo	1:35.70
2019	Out of Time	3	Dario Vargiu	Alduino Botti	Scuderia del Giglio Sardo	1:39.90
2020	Out of Time	4	Fabio Branca	Alduino Botti	Scuderia del Giglio Sardo	1:42.90
2021	Rubaiyat^{[c]}	4	Clement Lecoeuvre	Henk Grewe	Darius Racing	1:36.10
2022	Bounce The Blues	5	David Probert	Andrew Balding	Barbara Keller	1:39.90
2023	Brave Emperor	3	Luke Morris	Archie Watson	Middleham Park Racing LX	1:42.90
2024	Woodchuck	4	Ludovic Boisseau	Nicolas Bellanger	David Dromard	1:40.80
2025	Next Mine	3	Thore Hammer Hansen	Waldemar Hickst	Eckhard Sauren	1:46.30
2026	Crown Board	6	Marco Ghiani	Jane Chapple-Hyam	Laurence Holder	1:39.6

^{a} The 2008 running was cancelled because of a strike.
^{b} The 2017 winner Amore Hass was later exported to Hong Kong and renamed Xiang Bai Qi.
^{c} The 2021 running took place at Capannelle.

== Earlier winners ==
- 1980: Isopach
- 1981: Esclavo
- 1982: Kilian
- 1983: Coquelin
- 1984: King of Clubs
- 1985: Capo Nord
- 1986: Star Cutter
- 1987: Paris-Turf

== See also ==
- List of Italian flat horse races
