= Ramonti =

French-bred Thoroughbred racehorse

- Racing colours of Godolphin
- Sire: Martino Alonso
- Grandsire: Marju
- Dam: Fosca
- Damsire: El Gran Senor
- Sex: Stallion
- Foaled: 28 March 2002
- Country: France
- Colour: Bay
- Breeder: Scuderia Siba
- Owner: Scuderia Antezzate; Godolphin Racing
- Trainer: Alduino Botti; Saeed Bin Suroor
- Record: 20: 12-5-1
- Earnings: £1,951,582

Major wins
- Premio Parioli (2005); Premio Emilio Turati (2006); Premio Vittorio di Capua (2006); Premio Ribot (2006); Queen Anne Stakes (2007); Sussex Stakes (2007); Queen Elizabeth II Stakes (2007); Hong Kong Cup (2007)

Ramonti (28 March 2002 – 16 July 2019) is a retired French-bred Thoroughbred racehorse and active sire. He was originally trained in Italy, where he won eight races at the ages of three and four including the Group One Premio Vittorio di Capua. He was then bought by Godolphin Racing and was trained in Britain and the United Arab Emirates by Saeed Bin Suroor. For his new connections Ramonti won three of Britain's most important mile races in 2007, before winning the ten furlong Hong Kong Cup. At the end of the season he was one of the highest-ranked racehorses in the world over one mile. Ramonti was retired to stud after a single unsuccessful start in 2008.

== Background ==
Ramonti is a dark-coated bay horse with a small white star standing 16.2½ hands high. He was bred in France by Emilio Balzarini's Scuderia Siba, a breeding organisation based near Brescia in Italy, and originally raced in the colours of Balzarini's Scuderia Antezzate. Ramonti was sent into training with the brothers Giuseppe and Alduino Botti and was ridden in his early career by Giuseppe's son Endo. During the most successful period of his career, Ramonti raced with a tongue-tie.

Ramonti's sire, Martino Alonso, won six races and finished placed in the Premio Roma and the Premio Vittorio di Capua before retiring to stand at the Siba stud. In his first season at stud, he attracted little interest, and sired only nineteen foals, including Ramonti. After Ramonti's success made Martino Alonso a more popular stallion he was kidnapped in November 2009 and recovered by police six months later. He died following a paddock accident on 18 March 2012. Ramonti's dam, Fosca was an American-bred daughter of El Gran Senor and a direct descendant of the Fillies Triple Crown winner Meld.

== Racing career ==
=== 2005: three-year-old season ===
Ramonti was unraced as a two-year-old and began his career by winning a 1400m race at Milan's San Siro Racecourse on 30 March 2005. Eleven days later he was moved up to Listed class and won the Premio Daumier over 1600m at the Capannelle Racecourse in Rome. Two weeks later over the same course and distance he was raised in class again for the Group Two Premio Parioli, Italy's equivalent of the 2000 Guineas. Ridden by Edmondo Botti, he took the lead 200m from the finish and drew clear to win "comfortably" by two lengths from Le Giare.

Ramonti was then moved up in class and distance for the Group One Derby Italiano at the Capannelle on 22 May. Despite racing over a distance 800m further than he had previously attempted, he was made favourite at odds of 1/2 against fourteen opponents. Botti sent Ramonti to the front from the start and he continued to lead into the straight. In the last 200m however, he appeared to tire and was caught in the closing stages and beaten a head by De Sica. Ramonti did not run again that season.

=== 2006: four-year-old season ===
In April 2006, Ramonti made his first appearance for more than ten months when he won a minor stakes race over 1600m at San Siro. In May he finished second in a Listed race at the Capannelle and then won a similar event in Milan by five lengths, suggesting that he was returning to his best form. In June Ramonti returned to Group class to win the Premio Emilio Turati by two and a half lengths from Ryono. Two months later, his first race in international company ended in failure as he finished seventh of the ten runners behind Librettist and Manduro in the Prix Jacques le Marois at Deauville Racecourse.

Returning to Italy, Ramonti was surprisingly beaten at odds of 1/4 in a Listed race in Milan and then contested the Group One Premio Vittorio di Capua at the same course in October. Ridden as usual by Botti, Ramonti led from the start and pulled clear of his opponents in the straight to record his first Group One win by beating the British-trained favourite Notability by two and a half lengths. The Racing Post described Ramonti's win as "a brilliant front-running performance". On his final European start of the year, Ramonti started at odds of 2/5 in the Premio Ribot and won by five lengths from Mullins Bay, having led from the start. He was then sent to Sha Tin Racecourse for the Hong Kong Mile in which he made the running and then stayed on after being headed in the straight to finish third to the locally trained runners The Duke and Armada. At the end of the year, Ramonti was sold to the Godolphin Racing organisation and transferred to the stable of Saeed Bin Suroor, spending the winters in Dubai and the rest of the year based at Newmarket in England.

=== 2007: five-year-old season ===
Ramonti's first start for his new connections came in the Group One Lockinge Stakes over one mile at Newbury on 19 May. Before the race Saeed Bin Suroor had expressed his satisfaction with Ramonti, describing him as a "nice and honest" horse. Ridden for the first time by Frankie Dettori he was restrained in the early stages and raced just behind the leaders until making his challenge a furlong from the end of the race. In a closely contested finish, he failed by a head to catch the four-year-old filly Red Evie.

A month later, Ramonti appeared at Royal Ascot where he contested the Queen Anne Stakes on the first day of the meeting. On this occasion, Dettori allowed the horse to make the running and he held the lead into the straight. Two furlongs from the finish he was headed by the Michael Stoute-trained Jeremy, but rallied "gamely" in the closing stages to regain the lead and win by a short head. The previous year's leading three-year-old George Washington finished fourth, with Red Evie in seventh. After the race Godolphin's spokesman Simon Crisford admitted that the team were surprised by Ramonti's performance, saying that "we didn't anticipate he'd be winning this - we thought he would be a horse who we would campaign abroad." Dettori was subsequently disciplined by the Jockey Club stewards for excessive use of the whip on the winner. On 1 August Ramonti and Jeremy were matched against each other again in the Sussex Stakes at Goodwood. Ramonti raced in fifth place before moving forward to take the lead two furlongs from the finish. He quickly opened up a clear lead and stayed on strongly to hold the late challenge of the favourite Excellent Art by a head, with Jeremy third and Asiatic Boy in fourth.

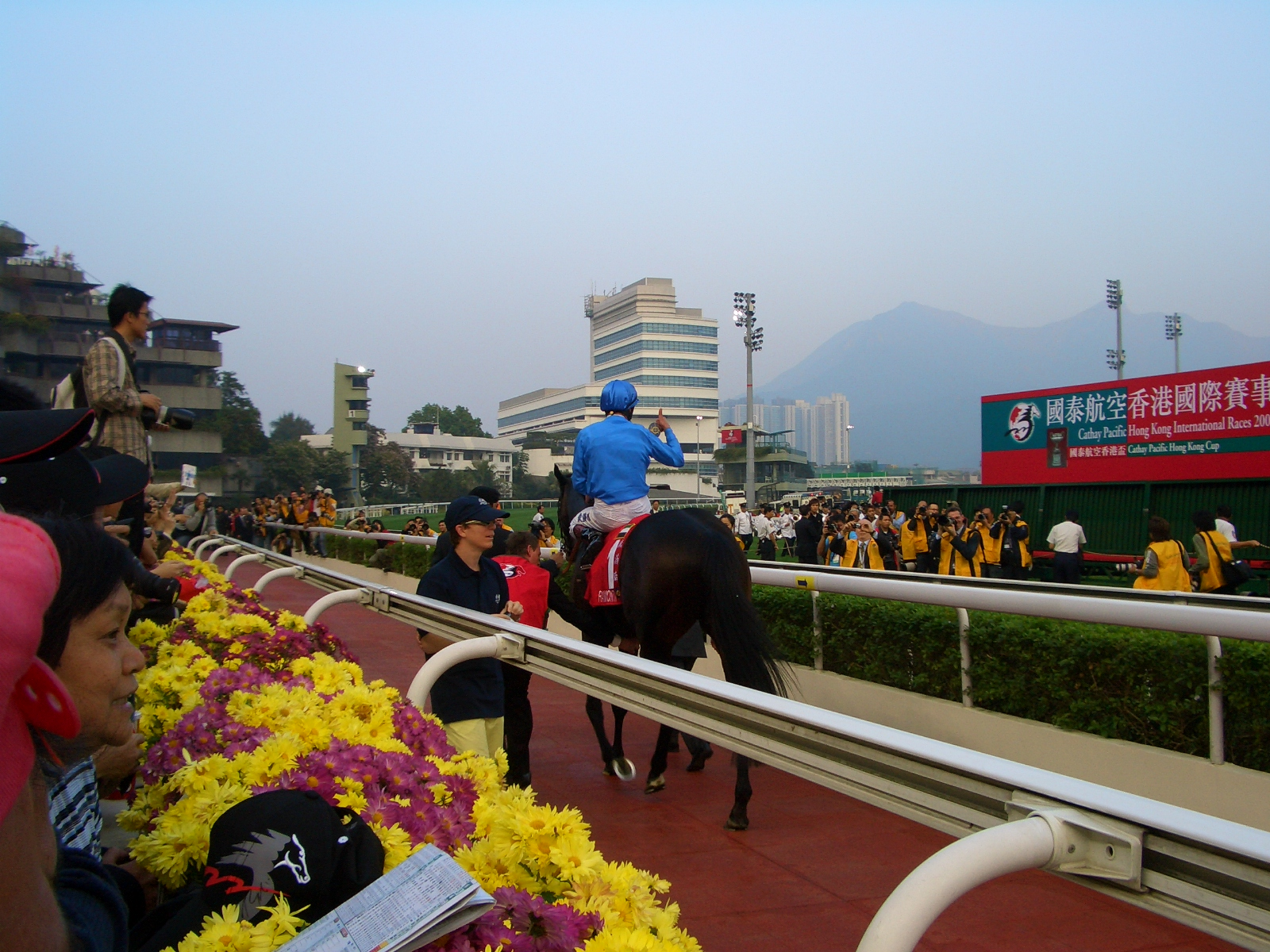
Ramonti and Frankie Dettori return after winning the Hong Kong Cup

In September, Ramonti was sent to France for the Prix du Moulin at Longchamp. He led 400m from the finish but was overtaken and beaten two lengths by the three-year-old filly Darjina. Three weeks later, Ramonti ran in the Queen Elizabeth II Stakes at Ascot and started at odd of 5/1 in a field which included Excellent Art, Darjina and Duke of Marmalade. Ramonti tracked the leaders in until moving into the lead in the straight. He went two lengths clear and was driven out by Dettori to win by half a length from Excellent Art. On his final appearance of the year, he traveled to Hong Kong to run in the Cathay Pacific Hong Kong Cup over ten furlongs, the longest distance he had attempted since his defeat in the Derby Italiano two and a half years earlier. In the Cup he was pitted against the leading local runners Viva Pataca, who started odds on favourite, and Vengeance of Rain. He raced in third before taking the lead in the straight and held the late challenge of Viva Pataca to win by half a length. Mick Kinane on the runner-up was unable to obtain a clear run and lodged a formal objection to the winner, but the racecourse stewards allowed Ramonti to keep the race after an inquiry. Dettori called Ramonti "probably one of the bravest horses I've ever ridden."

Ramonti remained in training as a six-year-old, but a leg infection delayed his preparation and he missed the first half of the season. In July he reappeared in the Group Two Summer Mile at Ascot in which he finished a disappointing fifth to Archipenko. A recurrence of his leg problems ruled him out for the rest of the season and he was retired to stud.

== Assessment ==
Timeform described Ramonti as "most genuine and consistent", and awarded him a rating of 126.

In the 2006 edition of the World Thoroughbred Racehorse Rankings, Ramonti was given a rating of 116, the highest for any Italian-trained horse that year, placing him just outside the world's top one hundred racehorses. A year later, he was rated on 123, placing him equal thirteenth in the world ratings, level with Rags to Riches and Notnowcato. He was the third highest-rated horse over one mile on turf, behind Manduro and Admire Moon.

In the 2007 Cartier Racing Awards, Ramonti was nominated for the titles of Best Older Horse and Horse of the Year, but lost out in both categories to Dylan Thomas. The awards were made in mid-November, meaning that Ramonti's win in Hong Kong was not taken into consideration.

== Stud record ==
Entered Stud in 2009 at Darley's Kildangan Stud in County Kildare, Ireland At Stud in 2010-17 Allevamento di Besnate near Mornago in Italy. At Stud in 2018-19 at SK Moszna in Poland. He died on 16 July 2019.

== Pedigree ==
Pedigree of Ramonti (FRA), bay horse, 2002
Sire Martino Alonso (IRE) 1994	Marju; 1988	Last Tycoon	Try My Best
Sire Martino Alonso (IRE) 1994	Marju; 1988	Last Tycoon	Mill Princess
Sire Martino Alonso (IRE) 1994	Marju; 1988	Flame of Tara	Artaius
Sire Martino Alonso (IRE) 1994	Marju; 1988	Flame of Tara	Welsh Flame
Sire Martino Alonso (IRE) 1994	Cheerful Note; 1987	Cure the Blues	Stop The Music
Sire Martino Alonso (IRE) 1994	Cheerful Note; 1987	Cure the Blues	Quick Cure
Sire Martino Alonso (IRE) 1994	Cheerful Note; 1987	Strident Note	The Minstrel
Sire Martino Alonso (IRE) 1994	Cheerful Note; 1987	Strident Note	Furioso
Dam Fosca (USA) 1995	El Gran Senor; 1981	Northern Dancer	Nearctic
Dam Fosca (USA) 1995	El Gran Senor; 1981	Northern Dancer	Natalma
Dam Fosca (USA) 1995	El Gran Senor; 1981	Sex Appeal	Buckpasser
Dam Fosca (USA) 1995	El Gran Senor; 1981	Sex Appeal	Best In Show
Dam Fosca (USA) 1995	La Locandiera; 1986	Alleged	Hoist The Flag
Dam Fosca (USA) 1995	La Locandiera; 1986	Alleged	Princess Pout
Dam Fosca (USA) 1995	La Locandiera; 1986	Moon Ingraver	Kalamoun
Dam Fosca (USA) 1995	La Locandiera; 1986	Moon Ingraver	Engraving (Family: 2-i)
