= Sanglamore =

American-bred Thoroughbred racehorse

- Sire: Sharpen Up
- Grandsire: Atan
- Dam: Ballinderry
- Damsire: Irish River
- Sex: Stallion
- Foaled: 1 March 1987
- Country: United States
- Colour: Chestnut
- Breeder: Juddmonte Farms
- Owner: Khalid Abdullah
- Trainer: Jeremy Tree; Roger Charlton
- Record: 8: 4-3-1
- Earnings: £529,048

Major wins
- Dante Stakes (1990); Prix du Jockey Club (1990); Prix d'Ispahan (1991)

Sanglamore (1 March 1987 – after 2007) was an American-bred, British-trained Thoroughbred racehorse and sire. In a racing career disrupted by injury, he won four of his eight races between November 1989 and July 1991. After finishing second in his only race as a juvenile in 1989, he emerged as one of the leading colts of his generation in the first half of the following year, winning the Dante Stakes in England and the Prix du Jockey Club in France. After a lengthy break, he returned as a four-year-old to win the Prix d'Ispahan and place in both the Eclipse Stakes and the King George VI & Queen Elizabeth Stakes. He was retired to stud at the end of the year but made little impact as a breeding stallion.

== Background ==
Sanglamore was a chestnut horse with a white blaze and a long white sock on his left hind leg bred in Kentucky by Juddmonte Farms the breeding organisation of his owner Khalid Abdullah. He was sired by Sharpen Up, a British racehorse who won the Middle Park Stakes in 1971 before becoming a successful breeding stallion. His other progeny included Pebbles, Kris, Trempolino, and Diesis. Sanglamore's dam Ballinderry was a high-class racemare who won the Ribblesdale Stakes at Royal Ascot and finished third in the Yorkshire Oaks. In addition to Sanglamore, she produced the Predominate Stakes winner Opera Score. As a descendant of the broodmare Miss Glasso, she was closely related to Azeri and the Poule d'Essai des Pouliches winners River Lady and Matiara.

Sanglamore was sent to Europe and went into training with Jeremy Tree at Beckhampton in Wiltshire.

== Racing career ==
=== 1989: two-year-old season ===
Sanglamore showed very little early promise, with Tree describing him as "absolutely useless" after his first serious training gallop. On his racecourse debut, the colt contested a maiden race over one mile at Leicester Racecourse on 7 November. Ridden by Steve Cauthen, he started the 5/1 third favourite behind the Guy Harwood-trained Lover's Moon and the filly Hellenic (later winner of the Yorkshire Oaks) in a field of seventeen runners. He raced in second place before being outpaced by Lover's Moon and finished second, three lengths behind the winner.

=== 1990: three-year-old season ===
In February 1990, Jeremy Tree retired, and his assistant Roger Charlton took over the Beckhampton Stable. Charlton inherited a crop of three-year-olds which also included the promising maiden Quest for Fame.

Sanglamore began his second season in a minor event over ten furlongs at Nottingham Racecourse on 16 April in which he was ridden by Pat Eddery, who became his regular jockey. Starting the 5/2 second favourite in a fifteen-runner field, he took the lead approaching the final furlong and won by two and a half lengths from the filly Helen's Guest. In the May Stakes at Newmarket Racecourse on 3 May, Sanglamore took the lead a quarter of a mile from the finish but was caught in the closing stages and beaten half a length by the 33/1 outsider Anvari. Nine days later, Anvari defeated a field which included the subsequent Belmont Stakes winner Go And Go in the Derrinstown Stud Derby Trial at Leopardstown Racecourse. On 16 May, Sanglamore was moved up in class for the Group Two Dante Stakes, a major trial race for The Derby. He started the 11/2 second favourite behind Anshan, a John Gosden-trained colt who had won the European Free Handicap before finishing third to Tirol and Machiavellian in the 2000 Guineas. Eddery tracked the leaders before turning into the straight in fourth behind Anshan, Karinga Bay, and Raj Waki. Sanglamore moved up to take the lead a furlong out and won by one and a half lengths from Karinga Bay, with Anshan the same distance away in third.

With Quest For Fame representing the Charlton stable in the Epsom Derby on 6 June, Sanglamore was aimed at the French equivalent, the Prix du Jockey Club over 2400 metres at Chantilly Racecourse three days earlier. He started at odds of 9.5/1 against eleven opponents including Anvari, Epervier Bleu (winner of the Prix Greffulhe and the Prix Lupin), Intimiste (Critérium de Saint-Cloud, Prix Noailles), Top Waltz (Prix Hocquart), Roi de Rome (Prix de Guiche), and Theatrical Charmer (Newmarket Stakes). Sanglamore was restrained by Eddery in the early stages before making headway in the straight. He overtook the leader, Epervier Bleu, inside the last 200 metres and won by half a length, with Erdelistan taking third ahead of Top Waltz and Panoramic. Sanglamore was then sidelined with injury and missed the rest of the season.

=== 1991: four-year-old season ===
Almost a year after his last racecourse appearance, Sanglamore returned to Chantilly for the Group One Prix d'Ispahan over 1800 metres on 2 June. He started the 4.4/1 fourth choice in the betting behind Zoman (Tattersalls Gold Cup), Priolo, and Kartajana (Prix Ganay), with the other three runners being Colour Chart (Prix de l'Opéra), Candy Glen (Gran Criterium), and Sikeston (Premio Presidente della Repubblica). In a change of tactics, Eddery sent Sanglamore into the lead from the start before going clear of the field in the straight. In the final 200 metres, he faced several challenges but held on to win by half a length from Priolo, with Zoman and Candy Glen just behind.

Five weeks later, Sanglamore contested the Eclipse Stakes over ten furlongs at Sandown Park Racecourse in which the Charlton stable also entered Greene's Ferneley to act as a pacemaker. He started at odds of 7/2 in a seven-runner field which included Stagecraft, In the Groove, Marju, and Terimon. Sanglamore tracked Greene's Ferneley before taking the lead in the straight but was soon overtaken and finished third behind the 28/1 outsider Environment Friend. On 27 July, Sanglamore was moved up in distance to contest Britain's most prestigious weight-for-age race, the King George VI & Queen Elizabeth Stakes over one and a half miles at Ascot Racecourse. He started third favourite behind the three-year-olds Generous (winner of The Derby) and Saddlers' Hall (King Edward VII Stakes). He proved no match for Generous, who won by seven lengths, but finished second ahead of Rock Hopper, Terimon and Sapience.

Following a recurrence of his previous injury, Sanglamore was retired on 20 October.

== Stud record ==
Sanglamore was retired from racing at the end of 1991 to become a breeding stallion for Juddmonte. By 1998, he was standing at Besnate, near Varese in Italy, and later stood as a National Hunt stallion in Ireland. The most successful of his progeny was Bangalore whose wins included the Chester Cup and the Northumberland Plate, whilst his other offspring included Lexa (Prix Corrida), and Redemption (West Yorkshire Hurdle).

== Pedigree ==
Pedigree of Sanglamore (USA), chestnut stallion, 1987
Sire Sharpen Up (GB) 1969	Atan (USA); 1961	Native Dancer	Polynesian
Sire Sharpen Up (GB) 1969	Atan (USA); 1961	Native Dancer	Geisha
Sire Sharpen Up (GB) 1969	Atan (USA); 1961	Mixed Marriage	Tudor Minstrel
Sire Sharpen Up (GB) 1969	Atan (USA); 1961	Mixed Marriage	Persiaan Maid
Sire Sharpen Up (GB) 1969	Rocchetta (GB); 1961	Rockefella	Hyperion
Sire Sharpen Up (GB) 1969	Rocchetta (GB); 1961	Rockefella	Rockfel
Sire Sharpen Up (GB) 1969	Rocchetta (GB); 1961	Chambiges	Majano
Sire Sharpen Up (GB) 1969	Rocchetta (GB); 1961	Chambiges	Chanterelle
Dam Ballinderry (GB) 1981	Irish River (FR); 1976	Riverman	Never Bend
Dam Ballinderry (GB) 1981	Irish River (FR); 1976	Riverman	River Lady
Dam Ballinderry (GB) 1981	Irish River (FR); 1976	Irish Star	Klairon
Dam Ballinderry (GB) 1981	Irish River (FR); 1976	Irish Star	Botany Bay
Dam Ballinderry (GB) 1981	Miss Manon (FR); 1970	Bon Mot	Worden
Dam Ballinderry (GB) 1981	Miss Manon (FR); 1970	Bon Mot	Djebel Idra
Dam Ballinderry (GB) 1981	Miss Manon (FR); 1970	Miss Molly	Molvedo
Dam Ballinderry (GB) 1981	Miss Manon (FR); 1970	Miss Molly	MIss Glasso (Family:1-l)
