= Premio Presidente della Repubblica (horse race) =

- Class: Group 3
- Location: Capannelle Racecourse; Rome, Italy
- Inaugurated: 1879
- Race type: Flat / Thoroughbred
- Website: Capannelle

Race information
- Distance: 1,800 m (1.1 mi; 8.9 furlongs)
- Surface: Turf
- Track: Right-handed
- Qualification: Four-years-old and up
- Weight: 58 kg Allowances; 1 1/2 kg for fillies and mares
- Purse: €163,800 (2022); 1st: €91,000

The Premio Presidente della Repubblica is a Group 3 flat horse race in Italy open to thoroughbreds aged four years or older. It is run over a distance of 1,800 m (1.1 mi) at Capannelle in May.

== History ==
The event was established in 1879, and it was originally called the Premio Omnium. It was initially open to horses aged three or older and contested over 3,500 metres. The first running was won by Macedonie. It was cut to 2,400 metres in 1882.

The race continued as the Premio Omnium until 1955. It was renamed the Premio Presidente della Repubblica in 1956. This was to commemorate the tenth anniversary of Italy becoming a republic.

The Premio Presidente della Repubblica was run over 2,200 metres in 1966. It was extended to 2,300 metres in 1967 and reduced to 2,000 metre in 1968. In 2016 it was reduced to 1,800 metres and downgraded to Group 2 having previously been contested at Group 1 level. It was downgraded to Group 3 in 2024.

The race was closed to three-year-olds in 1988.

== Records ==
Most successful horse (3 wins):

- Sansonetto – 1895, 1896 (dead-heat), 1898

Leading jockey (5 wins):

- Silvio Parravani – Murghab (1949), Alberigo (1953, 1955), Falerno (1954), Sedan (1959)

Leading trainer since 1985 (4 wins):

- Stefano Botti - Crackerjack King (2012), Vedelago (2013), Cleo Fan (2015), Time To Choose (2017)

Leading owner (12 wins):

- Razza Dormello-Olgiata – Bellini (1941), Tenerani (1948), Adam (1950), Tissot (1957), Antelami (1963), Haseltine (1965), Ben Marshall (1966), Appiani (1967), Hogarth (1970), Mannsfeld (1974, 1975), Maffei (1982)

== Winners since 1985 ==
Year	Winner	Age	Jockey	Trainer	Owner	Time
1985	Bob Back	4	Bruce Raymond	Michael Jarvis	Antonio Balzarini	2:00.50
1986	Malevic	5	Marco Paganini	Lorenzo Brogi	Scuderia Cieffedi	2:01.40
1987	Tony Bin	4	Michel Jerome	Luigi Camici	Allevamento White Star	2:03.60
1988	Tony Bin	5	Pat Eddery	Luigi Camici	Allevamento White Star	2:06.10
1989	Alwuhush	4	Willie Carson	John Dunlop	Hamdan Al Maktoum	2:02.60
1990	Tisserand	5	Vincenzo Mezzatesta	Mario Vincis	Agricola All. La Madia	2:04.50
1991	Sikeston	5	Michael Roberts	Clive Brittain	Luciano Gaucci	2:10.70
1992	Sikeston	6	Michael Roberts	Clive Brittain	Luciano Gaucci	2:01.40
1993	Great Palm	4	Alan Munro	Paul Cole	Fahd Salman	2:02.40
1994	Muhtarram	5	Willie Carson	John Gosden	Hamdan Al Maktoum	2:01.80
1995	Flagbird	4	Kevin Darley	Saeed bin Suroor	Godolphin	2:05.60
1996	Hollywood Dream	5	John Reid	Uwe Ostmann	Gestüt Ittlingen	2:06.40
1997	Artan	5	Ray Cochrane	Martin Rölke	Stall Brandenburg	2:02.70
1998	Polar Prince	5	Philip Robinson	Michael Jarvis	Christine Stevenson	2:01.20
1999	Central Park	4	Daragh O'Donohoe	Saeed bin Suroor	Godolphin	2:02.20
2000	Timboroa	4	Mirco Demuro	Roberto Brogi	Roberto Brogi	2:00.60
2001	Paolini	4	Andreas Suborics	Andreas Wöhler	Carde Ostermann-Richter	1:59.80
2002	Falbrav	4	Dario Vargiu	Luciano d'Auria	Scuderia Rencati	1:57.80
2003	Rakti	4	Philip Robinson	Michael Jarvis	Gary Tanaka	2:00.10
2004	Altieri	6	Mario Esposito	Vittorio Caruso	Scuderia Incolinx	1:58.70
2005	Altieri	7	Mario Esposito	Vittorio Caruso	Scuderia Incolinx	2:00.50
2006	Distant Way	5	Mirco Demuro	Lorenzo Brogi	All. La Nuova Sbarra	2:00.90
2007	Distant Way	6	Mirco Demuro	Lorenzo Brogi	All. La Nuova Sbarra	2:00.40
2008	Saddex	5	Kerrin McEvoy	Peter Rau	Stall Avena	2:02.60
2009	Selmis	5	Mirco Demuro	Vittorio Caruso	Scuderia Incolinx	2:02.90
2010	Querari	4	Eduardo Pedroza	Andreas Wöhler	Gestüt Fährhof	2:06.00
2011	Estejo	7	Umberto Rispoli	Ralf Rohne	Giovanne Martone	2:00.60
2012	Crackerjack King	4	Fabio Branca	Stefano Botti	Scuderia Effevi et al.	2:01.30
2013	Vedelago	4	Mario Esposito	Stefano Botti	G T A	2:01.50
2014	Refuse To Bobbin	4	Djorde Perovic	Attilio Giorgi	Scuderia Chimax	2:03.78
2015	Cleo Fan	4	Umberto Rispoli	Stefano Botti	Dioscuri Srl	1:59.50
2016	Diplomat	5	Dario Vargu	Mario Hofer	Eckhard Sauren	1:48.30
2017	Time To Choose	4	Fabio Branca	Stefano Botti	Scuderia Effevi	1:48.20
2018	Royal Julius	5	Gérald Mossé	Jérôme Reynier	Jade Prescillia Angelini	1:48.50
2019	Stormy Antarctic	6	Frankie Dettori	Ed Walker	P K Siu	1:53.20
2020	Thunderman (Note: The 2020 race was run in July due to the COVID-19 pandemic in Italy)	4	Salvatore Sulas	Alduino Botti	Scuderia Del Giglio Sardo Srl	1:48.75
2021	Attimo Fuggente	4	Fabio Branca	Alduino Botti	Scuderia Incolinx & Diego Romeo	1:47.90
2022	Cantocorale	4	Antonio Fresu	Grizzetti Galoppo SRL	Scuderia Blueberry SRL	1:53.00
2023	Skalleti	8	Antonio Orani	Jerome Reynier	Jean-Claude Seroul	1:50.30
2024	Woodchuck	4	Simon Planque	Nicolas Bellanger	David Dromard	1:50.20
2025	Woodchuck	5	Antonio Orani	Nicolas Bellanger	David Dromard	1:46.80
2026	Best Lightning	8	Benjamin Marie	Andreas Suborics	Stall Ad Episas	1:51.00

== Earlier winners ==
- 1879: Macedonie
- 1880: Don Pasquale
- 1881: Arc
- 1882: Sensation
- 1883: Fakir / Poeonia ^{1}
- 1884: Andreina
- 1885: Andreina
- 1886: Mantle
- 1887: Pythagoras
- 1888: Filiberto
- 1889: Rabicano
- 1890: Fitz Hampton
- 1891: Beppina
- 1892: Lucifer
- 1893: Caio
- 1894: Greco
- 1895: Sansonetto
- 1896: Pistenhuit / Sansonetto ^{1}
- 1897: Hareng
- 1898: Sansonetto
- 1899: Serpentina
- 1900: Marcantonio
- 1901: Marcantonio
- 1902: Tarantella
- 1903: Tarantella
- 1904: Marzio
- 1905: Cesar
- 1906: Ulpiano
- 1907: Olivo
- 1908: Demetrio
- 1909: Moroldo
- 1910: Sambar
- 1911: Badajoz
- 1912: Makufa
- 1913: Sigma
- 1914: Prometeo
- 1915: Giulio Romano
- 1916–20: no race
- 1921: Lord Allan
- 1922: Marcus
- 1923: Fiorello
- 1924: Scopas
- 1925: Manistee
- 1926: Manistee
- 1927: Paulo
- 1928: Varedo
- 1929: Nesiotes
- 1930: Cavaliere d'Arpino
- 1931: Sans Crainte
- 1932: Rumex
- 1933: Kennebe
- 1934: Pilade
- 1935: Partenio
- 1936: Nipissing
- 1937: De Albertis
- 1938: El Greco
- 1939: Gaio
- 1940: Sabla
- 1941: Bellini
- 1942: Scire
- 1943: Cola d'Amatrice
- 1944: De Nittis ^{2}
- 1945: no race
- 1946: Grifone
- 1947: Scanno
- 1948: Tenerani
- 1949: Murghab
- 1950: Adam
- 1951: Nuccio
- 1952: Iroquois
- 1953: Alberigo
- 1954: Falerno
- 1955: Alberigo
- 1956: Vittor Pisani
- 1957: Tissot
- 1958: Ismone
- 1959: Sedan
- 1960: Surdi
- 1961: Surdi
- 1962: Faenza
- 1963: Antelami
- 1964: Veronese
- 1965: Haseltine
- 1966: Ben Marshall
- 1967: Appiani
- 1968: Caspoggio
- 1969: Light Wind
- 1970: Hogarth
- 1971: Maestrale
- 1972: Hoche
- 1973: Moulton
- 1974: Mannsfeld
- 1975: Mannsfeld
- 1976: Shamsan
- 1977: Capo Bon
- 1978: Stone
- 1979: Rolle
- 1980: Deauville
- 1981: Ladislao di Oppelm
- 1982: Maffei
- 1983: Jalmood
- 1984: Bater

^{1} The 1883 and 1896 races were dead-heats and have joint winners.
^{2} The 1944 running took place at Milan.

== See also ==
- List of Italian flat horse races
- Recurring sporting events established in 1879 – this race is included under its original title, Premio Omnium.
