= Spartacus (horse) =

Irish-bred Thoroughbred racehorse

- Sire: Danehill
- Grandsire: Danzig
- Dam: Teslemi
- Damsire: Ogygian
- Sex: Stallion
- Foaled: 4 March 2000
- Country: Ireland
- Colour: Bay
- Breeder: Ron Con Ltd
- Owner: Susan Magnier
- Trainer: Aidan O'Brien
- Record: 8: 3-1-0
- Earnings: £244,399

Major wins
- Phoenix Stakes (2002); Gran Criterium (2002)

Spartacus (4 March 2000 – November 2012) was an Irish-bred Thoroughbred racehorse and sire. He showed his best form as a two-year-old in 2002 when he ran in four different countries and recorded Group 1 victories in the Phoenix Stakes and the Gran Criterium. He failed to show any worthwhile form in the following year and was retired to stud. He stood as a breeding stallion in Ireland, New Zealand and Australia and had modest success as a sire of winners. He died in 2012 at the age of twelve.

== Background ==
Spartacus was a bay horse bred in Ireland by Ron Con Ltd, a breeding company associated with John Magnier's Coolmore organisation. He was sent into training with Aidan O'Brien at Ballydoyle and raced in the colours of Susan Magnier.

Spartacus was sired by Danehill, a sprinter who won the Cork and Orrery Stakes and Haydock Sprint Cup in 1989. He went on to become a highly successful breeding stallion, producing the winners of more than one thousand races including 156 at Group One/Grade I level. Among his best offspring were Dylan Thomas, Duke of Marmalade, Rock of Gibraltar George Washington and North Light. Spartacus's dam Teslemi showed modest racing ability, winning one minor race from eight starts but did better as a broodmare, producing several other winners including the Hong Kong Derby winner Johann Cruyff.

== Racing career ==
=== 2002: two-year-old season ===
Spartacus made his debut on 15 May in a maiden race over seven furlongs at Gowran Park in which he started 4/5 favourite against nine opponents. Ridden by Mick Kinane he took the lead approaching the final furlong and quickly drew away to win "easily" by three lengths. In June the colt was dropped in distance and moved up sharply in class when he was sent to England for the Group 3 Coventry Stakes over six furlongs at Royal Ascot. He never looked likely to trouble the leaders and finished ninth behind his stablemate Statue of Liberty. He produced a much better effort at the Curragh in July when he finished second to Oratorio (another O'Brien trainee) in the Anglesey Stakes.

On 11 August at the Curragh the colt was stepped up again in class for the Group 1 Phoenix Stakes in which he was partnered by Colm O'Donoghue. He was the least fancied of the Ballydoyle quartet, starting ay 16/1 whereas Hold That Tiger was made 11/10 favourite with Marino Marini (Marble Hill Stakes) on 7/2 and Oratorio on 9/1. The best fancied of the other five runners were the fillies Cassis (runner-up in the Cherry Hinton Stakes) and Luminata (Silver Flash Stakes). Spartacus led from the start before giving way to Marino Marini a quarter mile from the finish but then rallied to regain the advantage inside the final furlong. He kept on well in the closing stages to win by half a length from Marino Marini with the outsider Polar Force a short head away in third. After the race Aidan O'Brien aid "It's not a huge surprise. We've always thought very highly of him. He went from winning a seven-furlong maiden at Gowran Park to the Coventry at Royal Ascot, where he was all at sea back to six furlongs on very fast ground which he had never worked or raced on. Johnny Murtagh rode him that day and said it was like riding a horse in his first piece of work. He's obviously an improving colt and should stay further."

After missing a scheduled run in the National Stakes Spartacus was sent to France for the Grand Critérium at Longchamp on 8 October and finished seventh of the fourteen runners behind Hold That Tiger. Two weeks after his defeat in Paris attempted to end his season with a second Group 1 success when he travelled to Italy ad started 1.3/1 favourite for the Gran Criterium over 1600 metres at San Siro Racecourse in Milan. The best of his rivals appeared to be the British challengers Excelsius and Tacitus (second in the July Stakes) and the locally trained and Balkenhol. The twelve runners were reduced to nine after 400 metres when Chippolino fell and brought down Winning Dash and Silverboat. Spartacus led early before settling in third and then regained the lead in the straight. He stayed on well and won by three lengths from the Mick Channon-trained outsider Checkit.

=== 2003: three-year-old season ===
Spartacus missed the spring of 2003 and returned after an absence of eight months in the Grand Prix de Paris over 2000 metres at Longchamp on 22 June. He raced in third place for most of the way but faded badly in the straight and finished last of the eleven runners. In the Sussex Stakes at Goodwood a month later he disputed the lead in the early stages before dropping away in the straight and finishing last of the nine runners, ten lengths behind the winner Reel Buddy.

== Stud record ==
Spartacus was retired from racing to become a breeding stallion for the Coolmore Stud. After standing for four years in County Tipperary was sold and exported to New Zealand where he was based at The Oaks Stud. In 2012 he was transferred to the Cangon Stud in New South Wales. In late November 2012 he was found dead in his paddock at Cangon Stud after suffering a ruptured aorta.

His best winners included All The Aces (Fred Archer Stakes), Rastignano (Gran Premio d'Italia) and Strait of Mewsina (Hawthorne Derby) and Spare A Fortune (Group 3 Metric Mile Handicap). He was champion first-season sire in New Zealand.

== Pedigree ==
Pedigree of Spartacus (IRE), bay stallion, 2000
Sire Danehill (USA) 1986	Danzig (USA); 1977	Northern Dancer	Nearctic
Sire Danehill (USA) 1986	Danzig (USA); 1977	Northern Dancer	Natalma
Sire Danehill (USA) 1986	Danzig (USA); 1977	Pas de Nom	Admiral's Voyage
Sire Danehill (USA) 1986	Danzig (USA); 1977	Pas de Nom	Petitioner
Sire Danehill (USA) 1986	Rayzana (USA); 1981	His Majesty	Ribot
Sire Danehill (USA) 1986	Rayzana (USA); 1981	His Majesty	Flower Bowl
Sire Danehill (USA) 1986	Rayzana (USA); 1981	Spring Adieu	Buckpasser
Sire Danehill (USA) 1986	Rayzana (USA); 1981	Spring Adieu	Natalma
Dam Teslemi (USA) 1989	Ogygian (USA); 1983	Damascus	Sword Dancer
Dam Teslemi (USA) 1989	Ogygian (USA); 1983	Damascus	Kerala
Dam Teslemi (USA) 1989	Ogygian (USA); 1983	Gonfalon	Francis S.
Dam Teslemi (USA) 1989	Ogygian (USA); 1983	Gonfalon	Grand Splendor
Dam Teslemi (USA) 1989	Martha Queen (USA); 1983	Nijinsky	Northern Dancer
Dam Teslemi (USA) 1989	Martha Queen (USA); 1983	Nijinsky	Flaming Page
Dam Teslemi (USA) 1989	Martha Queen (USA); 1983	Rosetta Stone	Round Table
Dam Teslemi (USA) 1989	Martha Queen (USA); 1983	Rosetta Stone	Rose Coral (Family: 26)

- Like all of Danehill's offspring Spartacus inbred 4 x 4 to the mare Natalma. This means that she occurs twice in the fourth generation of her pedigree.
