= Premio Lydia Tesio =

- Class: Group 2
- Location: Capannelle Racecourse; Rome, Italy
- Race type: Flat / Thoroughbred
- Website: Capannelle

Race information
- Distance: 2,000 metres (1¼ miles)
- Surface: Turf
- Track: Right-handed
- Qualification: Three-years-old and up fillies and mares
- Weight: 55 kg (3yo); 57 kg (4yo+)
- Purse: €275,000 (2016); 1st: €80,750

The Premio Lydia Tesio is a Group 2 flat horse race in Italy open to thoroughbred fillies and mares aged three years or older. It is run at Capannelle over a distance of 2,000 metres (about 1¼ miles), and it is scheduled to take place each year in late October.

== History ==
The event is named in memory of Lydia Tesio, the wife of Federico Tesio. For a period it was restricted to fillies aged three or four. It was given Group 2 status in 1975.

The race was first promoted to Group 1 level in 1977, but it was relegated back to Group 2 in 1988. It was opened to five-year-old mares in 1990, and its upper age limit became unrestricted in 1992.

The Premio Lydia Tesio regained Group 1 status in 2004. Its recent sponsors have included Darley, Shadwell and Longines.

From 2017 to 2018 the Premio Lydia Tesio is Italy's only remaining Group 1 race. It downgraded to Group 2 at 2019.

== Records ==
Most successful horse:

- no horse has won this race more than once since 1968

Leading jockey since 1968 (5 wins):

- Fabio Branca - Quiza Quiza Quiza (2011), Charity Line (2013), Final Score (2014), Sound Of Freedom (2016), Call Me Love (2019)

Leading trainer since 1968 (4 wins):

- Sergio Cumani – Dobrowa (1969), Dudinka (1973), Grande Nube (1975), Time and Life (1976)

Leading owner since 1968 (4 wins):

- Scuderia Effevi - Charity Line (2013), Final Score (2014), Sound Of Freedom (2016), Call Me Love (2019)

== Winners since 1980 ==
Year	Winner	Age	Jockey	Trainer	Owner	Time
1980	Marmolada	3	C. Forte	Enrico Camici	Scuderia Gabriella	2:02.80
1981	Oraston	3	John Reid	Fulke Johnson Houghton	P. Kerr
1982	Friendswood	3	Ovidio Pessi	Luigi Turner	Nelson Bunker Hunt	2:00.40
1983	Right Bank	3	Marcel Depalmas	John Cunnington, Jr.	Paul de Moussac	2:06.10
1984	Stufida	3	Sandro Atzori	Alduino Botti	Scuderia Rencati
1985	Jemifa	3	Jacques Heloury	Patrick Biancone	Ecurie Jules Ouaki	2:05.00
1986	Dubian	4	Michael Roberts	Alec Stewart	Mohamed Obaida	2:05.80
1987	Khariyda	3	Olivier Poirier	Alain de Royer-Dupré	HH Aga Khan IV	2:05.80
1988	Medi Flash	4	A. Luongo	Ovidio Pessi	Allevamento White Star	2:05.30
1989	Miss Secreto	3	Michael Roberts	John Dunlop	Allevamento White Star	2:02.90
1990	Ruby Tiger	3	Richard Quinn	Paul Cole	Mrs Philip Blacker	2:00.60
1991	Lara's Idea	3	Gianfranco Dettori	Luigi Camici	Scuderia Ri-Ma	2:02.60
1992	Oumaldaaya	3	Willie Carson	John Dunlop	Hamdan Al Maktoum	2:01.30
1993	Pracer	3	Olivier Poirier	Alain de Royer-Dupré	Razza Montalbano	2:04.20
1994	Alpride	3	Peo Perlanti	Mario Ciciarelli	Scuderia Briantea	2:03.70
1995	Pourquoi Pas	3	A. Herrera	Marco Gasparini	Francesca Turri	2:00.90
1996	Grey Way	3	Edmondo Botti	Giuseppe Botti	Carlo Vittadini	2:02.10
1997	Papering	4	Fernando Jovine	Luca Cumani	Sheikh Mohammed	2:00.50
1998	Lomita	4	Edmondo Botti	Andreas Schütz	Gestüt Wittekindshof	2:05.70
1999	Zomaradah	4	Fernando Jovine	Luca Cumani	M. Obaid Al Maktoum	2:02.30
2000	Claxon	4	Richard Quinn	John Dunlop	Hesmonds Stud	2:07.20
2001	Najah	3	Willie Supple	Saeed bin Suroor	Godolphin	2:02.10
2002	Marotta	3	Thierry Jarnet	Richard Gibson	Antoinette Oppenheimer	2:05.10
2003	Whortleberry	3	Franck Blondel	François Rohaut	Jacques Berès	2:09.90
2004	Lune d'Or	3	Thierry Jarnet	Richard Gibson	Mrs Paul de Moussac	2:02.40
2005	Dubai Surprise	3	Ted Durcan	Saeed bin Suroor	Godolphin	2:06.30
2006	Floriot	4	Karoly Kerekes	Werner Glanz	Clarissa Hiddemann	2:06.40
2007	Turfrose	3	Mario Sanna	Pierluigi Giannotti	Pierluigi Giannotti	2:02.60
2008	no race ^{[a]}
2009	Eva's Request	4	Alan Munro	Mick Channon	Liam Mulryan	2:04.30
2010	Aoife Alainn	3	Umberto Rispoli	Maurizio Guarnieri	Maurizio Guarnieri	2:04.30
2011	Quiza Quiza Quiza	5	Fabio Branca	Luigi Riccardi	Riccardo Cantoni	2:03:50
2012	Sortilege	4	Andrea Atzeni	Andreas Wöhler	Gestüt Karlshof	2:07:70
2013	Charity Line	3	Fabio Branca	Stefano Botti	Scuderia Effevi	2:03.06
2014	Final Score	3	Fabio Branca	Stefano Botti	Scuderia Effevi	2:02.00
2015	Odeliz	5	Adrie de Vries	Karl Burke	Barbara M Keller	2:00.60
2016	Sound Of Freedom	4	Fabio Branca	Stefano Botti	Scuderia Effevi	2:03.70
2017	Laganore	5	Colin Keane	Tony Martin	Newtown Anner Stud	1:58.80
2018	God Given	4	Jason Watson	Luca Cumani	St Albans Bloodstock Limited	2:16.40
2019	Call Me Love	3	Fabio Branca	Alduino Botti	Scuderia Effevi	2:06.00
2020	Angel Power	3	Gérald Mossé	Roger Varian	King Power Racing Co Ltd	2:03.20
2021	Sopran Basilea	3	Carlo Fiocchi	Grizzetti Galoppo SRL	Leonardo Ciampoli	2:06.05
2022	Romagna Mia	3	Alberto Sanna	Luigi Di Dio	Scuderia Dell'Avvocato	1:59.83
2023	La Gite	3	Carlo Fiocchi	Paolo Aragoni	Luigi Ginobbi	2:03.70
2024	Sioux Life	3	Dario Di Tocco	Endo Botti	La Tesa Spa	2:04.70
2025	Charlotte's Web	4	Jack Mitchell	Simon & Ed Crisford	Sheikh Hamdan bin Mohammed Al Maktoum	2:00.90

^{a} The 2008 running was cancelled because of a strike.

== Earlier winners ==
- 1968: Atala
- 1969: Dobrowa
- 1970: Croda Rossa
- 1971: Black Dragoness
- 1972: Ciacoleta
- 1973: Dudinka
- 1974: Orsa Maggiore
- 1975: Grande Nube
- 1976: Time and Life
- 1977: Zabarella
- 1978: Giustizia
- 1979: Azzurrina

== See also ==
- List of Italian flat horse races
