= Muhtarram =

American-bred Thoroughbred racehorse

- Racing silks of Hamdan Al Maktoum
- Sire: Alleged
- Grandsire: Hoist The Flag
- Dam: Ballet de France
- Damsire: Northern Dancer
- Sex: Stallion
- Foaled: 22 February 1989
- Country: United States
- Colour: Bay
- Breeder: Cotswold Farm 1985 Ltd
- Owner: Hamdan Al Maktoum
- Trainer: John Gosden
- Record: 20: 8-3-2
- Earnings: £562,031

Major wins
- Irish Champion Stakes (1993); Premio Presidente della Repubblica (1994); Prince of Wales's Stakes (1994, 1995)

Muhtarram was (22 February 1989 – 7 March 2009) an American-bred, British-trained Thoroughbred race horse. He won the Prince of Wales's Stakes at Ascot twice, in addition to the Irish Champion Stakes and the Premio Presidente della Repubblica in Italy.

== Background ==
Muhtarram was a bay horse bred in the United States by Cotswold Farm 1985 Ltd. He was sired by the dual Prix de l'Arc de Triomphe winner Alleged. He was trained throughout his racing career by John Gosden and was ridden in all but one of his races by Willie Carson.

== Racing career ==
As a two-year-old in 1991, Muhtarram won both of his races, winning a maiden race at Leicester Racecourse in July and the Pytchley Stakes at the same course in October.

In the following year, Muhtarram ran three times. He finished fourth behind Alnasr Alwasheek in the Craven Stakes, fifth behind Rodrigo de Triano in the 2000 Guineas and fourth behind Dr Devious in The Derby.

Muhtarram did not race again until August 1993 when he won a minor stakes race at Sandown and followed up by winning the Listed Strensall Stakes at Doncaster on 2 September. Nine days after his win at Doncaster, Muhtarram was moved up in class to contest the Irish Champion Stakes at Leopardstown. Ridden by the veteran Willie Carson he took the lead inside the final furlong and won by half a length from the favourite Opera House. On his final appearance of the season he finished seventh behind Hatoof in the Champion Stakes.

As a five-year-old, Muhtarram began his season by travelling to Italy, where he won the Premio Presidente della Repubblica in Rome on 15 May. Ten days later in Paris he was beaten a neck by Bigstone in the Prix d'Ispahan. He returned to England in June for the Prince of Wales's Stakes at Royal Ascot where he defeated Ezzoud by a neck. Muhtarram did not win again in 1994, but ran consistently well in major middle-distance races: he finished second in the Grand Prix de Saint-Cloud, second in the International Stakes, third in the Arlington Million, fourth in the Irish Champion Stakes and third in the Champion Stakes.

Muhtarram remained in training as a six-year-old and ran three times. After finishing fifth in the Lockinge Stakes at Newbury in May he returned to Royal Ascot in June for the Prince of Wales's Stakes. He won the race for the second time, defeating Eltish by a short-head with the odds-on favourite Balanchine in fifth place. On his final appearance, Muhtarram finished sixth behind Halling in the Eclipse Stakes at Sandown.

== Stud career ==
Muhtarram was retired to stud at the end of 1995. He had limited success as a sire of winners and died on 7 March 2009. His best winners were the Henry II Stakes winner Fight Your Corner, and the Meld Stakes winner Muakaad. He was also the damsire of dual Oaks winner Sariska.

== Pedigree ==
Pedigree of Muhtarram (USA), bay stallion, 1989
Sire Alleged (USA) 1974	Hoist The Flag; 1968	Tom Rolfe	Ribot
Sire Alleged (USA) 1974	Hoist The Flag; 1968	Tom Rolfe	Pocahontas
Sire Alleged (USA) 1974	Hoist The Flag; 1968	Wavy Navy	War Admiral
Sire Alleged (USA) 1974	Hoist The Flag; 1968	Wavy Navy	Triomphe
Sire Alleged (USA) 1974	Princess Pout; 1966	Prince John	Princequillo
Sire Alleged (USA) 1974	Princess Pout; 1966	Prince John	Not Afraid
Sire Alleged (USA) 1974	Princess Pout; 1966	Determined Lady	Determine
Sire Alleged (USA) 1974	Princess Pout; 1966	Determined Lady	Tumbling
Dam Ballet de France (USA) 1981	Northern Dancer; 1961	Nearctic	Nearco
Dam Ballet de France (USA) 1981	Northern Dancer; 1961	Nearctic	Lady Angela
Dam Ballet de France (USA) 1981	Northern Dancer; 1961	Natalma	Native Dancer
Dam Ballet de France (USA) 1981	Northern Dancer; 1961	Natalma	Almahmoud
Dam Ballet de France (USA) 1981	Fabulous Native; 1974	Le Fabuleux	Wild Risk
Dam Ballet de France (USA) 1981	Fabulous Native; 1974	Le Fabuleux	Anguar
Dam Ballet de France (USA) 1981	Fabulous Native; 1974	Alyne Que	Raise a Native
Dam Ballet de France (USA) 1981	Fabulous Native; 1974	Alyne Que	Mellow Marsh (Family:10-a)
