= Premio Roma =

- Class: Group 2
- Location: Capannelle Racecourse; Rome, Italy
- Inaugurated: 1911
- Race type: Flat / Thoroughbred
- Website: Capannelle

Race information
- Distance: 2,000 metres (1¼ miles)
- Surface: Turf
- Track: Right-handed
- Qualification: Three-years-old and up
- Weight: 57 kg (3yo); 58 kg (4yo+); Allowances; 1½ kg for fillies and mares
- Purse: €242,000 (2016); 1st: €80,750

The Premio Roma is a Group 2 flat horse race in Italy open to thoroughbreds aged three years or older. It is run at Capannelle over a distance 2,000 metres (about 1¼ miles), and it is scheduled to take place each year in November.

== History ==
The event was established in 1911, and it was originally contested over 2,700 metres. The inaugural running had prize money of 50,000 lire.

The race was shortened to 2,100 metres in 1913. It was extended to 2,200 metres in 1919, and increased to 2,800 metres in 1925.

The Premio Roma was given Group 1 status in the 1970s. It was cut to 2,000 metres in 1988. It was downgraded to Group 2 status in 2017.

== Records ==
Most successful horse (2 wins):

- Pampino – 1933, 1934
- Grifone – 1947, 1949
- Surdi – 1961, 1962
- Bacuco – 1969, 1970
- Duke of Marmalade – 1975 (dead-heat), 1976
- Taipan – 1997, 1998
- Elle Danzig – 1999, 2000
- Soldier Hollow – 2004, 2005

Leading jockey (6 wins):

- Paolo Caprioli – Adelmo (1923), Old Master (1924), Ravioli (1925), Lui (1926), Vimarino (1932), Gaio (1939)

Leading trainer since 1974 (4 wins):

- John Dunlop – High Hawk (1983), Highland Chieftain (1989), Taipan (1997, 1998)

Leading owner (4 wins): (includes part ownership)

- Federico Tesio – Salvator Rosa (1912), Brunelleschi (1914), Nicophana (1935), Attalo (1938)
- Frank Turner – Apulejo (1915), Adelmo (1923), Old Master (1924), Ravioli (1925)
- Razza del Soldo – Vimarino (1932), Gaio (1939), Falerno (1954), Chitet (1957)
- Scuderia Mantova – Galea (1940), Piavola (1946), Carolina (1960), Astese (1966)

== Winners since 1979 ==
Year	Winner	Age	Jockey	Trainer	Owner	Time
1979	Noble Saint	3	Lester Piggott	Robert Armstrong	Raymond Guest	3:22.00
1980	Mariella	3	Philippe Paquet	François Boutin	Gerry Oldham	3:13.10
1981	Dentz ^{[a]}	3	Vittorio Panici	Federico Regoli	Razza di Vedano	3:04.50
1982	Campero	5	Alain Lequeux	David Smaga	Ignacio Correas	3:11.50
1983	High Hawk	3	Willie Carson	John Dunlop	Sheikh Mohammed	3:03.90
1984	Yawa	4	Joe Mercer	Geoff Lewis	Elisha Holding	3:03.00
1985	Old Country	6	Lester Piggott	Luca Cumani	Mrs O. Abegg	3:05.40
1986	Fire of Life	4	Michel Jerome	Luigi Camici	Allevamento White Star	2:58.60
1987	Orban	4	Steve Cauthen	Henry Cecil	Prince A. A. Faisal	2:55.50
1988	Welsh Guide	3	Michael Kinane	Michael Jarvis	L. Monaldi	2:02.70
1989	Highland Chieftain	6	Willie Carson	John Dunlop	Derek Hunnisett	2:02.60
1990	Legal Case	4	Frankie Dettori	Luca Cumani	Sir Gordon White	2:02.30
1991	Sikeston	5	Michael Roberts	Clive Brittain	Luciano Gaucci	2:06.50
1992	Misil	4	Frankie Dettori	Vittorio Caruso	Scuderia Laghi	2:07.40
1993	Knifebox	5	Pat Eddery	John Gosden	Sheikh Mohammed	2:07.60
1994	Big Tobin	5	Maurizio Pasquale	Luigi Camici	Lady Costanza Stable	2:07.50
1995	Slicious	3	Mario Esposito	Vittorio Caruso	Scuderia Laghi	2:00.80
1996	Flemensfirth	4	Frankie Dettori	John Gosden	Sheikh Mohammed	2:00.80
1997	Taipan	5	John Reid	John Dunlop	4th Baron Swaythling	2:06.40
1998	Taipan	6	Pat Eddery	John Dunlop	Exors of Lord Swaythling	2:03.30
1999	Elle Danzig	4	Andrasch Starke	Andreas Schütz	Gestüt Wittekindshof	2:07.10
2000	Elle Danzig	5	Andrasch Starke	Andreas Schütz	Gestüt Wittekindshof	2:09.30
2001	Shibuni's Falcon	4	Mario Esposito	Maurizio Guarnieri	Scuderia Athena	2:05.90
2002	Sunstrach	4	Frankie Dettori	Emilio Borromeo	Scuderia Rencati	2:02.70
2003	Imperial Dancer	5	Ted Durcan	Mick Channon	Imperial Racing	2:01.60
2004	Soldier Hollow	4	William Mongil	Peter Schiergen	Gestüt Park Wiedingen	2:02.70
2005	Soldier Hollow	5	William Mongil	Peter Schiergen	Gestüt Park Wiedingen	2:04.20
2006	Cherry Mix	5	Ted Durcan	Saeed bin Suroor	Godolphin	1:59.40
2007	Pressing	4	Neil Callan	Michael Jarvis	Gary Tanaka	2:02.10
2008	Estejo	4	Daniele Porcu	Ralf Rohne	Giovanne Martone	2:06.70
2009	Voila Ici	4	Mirco Demuro	Vittorio Caruso	Scuderia Incolinx	2:10.40
2010	Rio de la Plata	5	Frankie Dettori	Saeed bin Suroor	Godolphin	2:02.70
2011	Zazou	4	Mickael Barzalona	Waldemar Hickst	WH Sport International	2:03.40
2012	Hunter's Light	4	Silvestre de Sousa	Saeed bin Suroor	Godolphin	2:03.38
2013	Feuerblitz	4	Thierry Thulliez	Michael Figge	Stall Evissa	1:59.14
2014	Priore Philip	3	Dario Vargiu	Stefano Botti	Scuderia Ste Ma	1:58.40
2015	Dylan Mouth	4	Fabio Branca	Stefano Botti	Scuderia Effevi	1:59.70
2016	Potemkin	5	Eduardo Pedroza	Andreas Wöhler	Allofs & Stiftung Gestut Fahrhof	2:06.80
2017	Anda Muchacho	3	Dario Vargiu	Nicolo Simondi	Scuderia Incolinx & Diego Romeo	2:03.60
2018	Va Bank	6	Eduardo Pedroza	Andreas Wöhler	Team Valor Int. & J P Zienkiewicz	2:14.60
2019	Skalleti	4	Pierre-Charles Boudot	Jerome Reynier	Jean-Claude Seroul	2:07.50
2020	Thunderman	4	Salvatore Sulas	Alduino Botti	Scuderia Del Giglio Sardo Srl	1:58.99
2021	Skalleti	6	Antonio Orani	Jerome Reynier	Jean-Claude Seroul	2:05.09
2022	Cantocorale	4	Andrea Atzeni	Grizzetti Galoppo SRL	Scuderia Blueberry SRL	2:00.17
2023	Flag's Up	5	Mario Sanna	Stefano Botti	Roberto Saggini	2:01.00
2024	Petit Marin	5	Dario Di Tocco	Marcel Weiss	Dirk Von Mitzlaff	2:03.90
2025	Woodchuck	5	Antonio Orani	Nicolas Bellanger	David Dromard	2:02.00

^{a} The 1981 winner Dentz was later renamed Looking For.

== Earlier winners ==
- 1911: Dedalo
- 1912: Salvator Rosa
- 1913: Sigma
- 1914: Brunelleschi
- 1915: Apulejo
- 1916: Aristippo
- 1917: no race
- 1918: Hollebeck
- 1919: Alcione
- 1920: Talaat Basa
- 1921: Marcus
- 1922: Pompea
- 1923: Adelmo
- 1924: Old Master
- 1925: Ravioli
- 1926: Lui
- 1927: Paulo
- 1928: Moltrasio
- 1929: Tigliano
- 1930: Emanuele Filiberto
- 1931: Eucaliptolo
- 1932: Vimarino
- 1933: Pampino
- 1934: Pampino
- 1935: Nicophana
- 1936: Ahmed
- 1937: Sinni
- 1938: Attalo
- 1939: Gaio
- 1940: Galea
- 1941: Zuccarello
- 1942–44: no race
- 1945: Buonarrota
- 1946: Piavola
- 1947: Grifone
- 1948: Eldorado
- 1949: Grifone
- 1950: Saccaroa
- 1951: Bandinella
- 1952: Worden
- 1953: Neebisch
- 1954: Falerno
- 1955: Bewitched
- 1956: Tissot
- 1957: Chitet
- 1958: Terma
- 1959: Feria
- 1960: Caorlina
- 1961: Surdi
- 1962: Surdi
- 1963: Veronese
- 1964: Haseltine
- 1965: Demi Deuil
- 1966: Astese
- 1967: Carlos Primero
- 1968: Chicago
- 1969: Bacuco
- 1970: Bacuco
- 1971: Fidyi
- 1972: Irvine
- 1973: Sang Bleu
- 1974: Orsa Maggiore
- 1975: Duke of Marmalade / Henri le Balafre *
- 1976: Duke of Marmalade
- 1977: Montorselli
- 1978: Nizon

* The 1975 race was a dead-heat and has joint winners.

== See also ==
- List of Italian flat horse races
