= Antonio Balzarini =

Italian racehorse owner

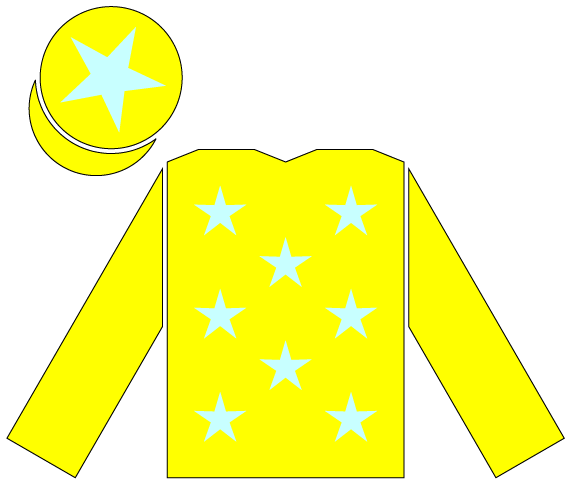
Racing colours of Antonio Balzarini

Antonio Balzarini (born c. 1933) is a businessman and was a successful Italian racehorse owner (stable AJB) that bought the racehorse Carroll House from Gerald Carroll. The horse was trained by Michael Jarvis at Newmarket, and won the Prix de l'Arc de Triomphe in 1989.

Balzarini also owned Creaking Board (Hollywood Starlet Stakes G1 (USA), Bob Back (Prince of Wales's Stakes 1985) ( and Atoll, winner of the Italian 1000 Guineas (Premio Regina Elena) and Oaks in 1990. He also won, as owner, all the most important classics in Italy, including the Derby in 1989 with Prorutori. Balzarini won in total more than 40 Groups and about 100 Listed.

Best Horses:

Carroll House, Prix de Arc the Triomphe G1 1989, Irish Champion Stakes G1 1989, Princess of Wales's Stakes G2 1989, Grosser Preis Von Baden G1 1988, Furstenberg Renner G3

Bob Back, Prince of Wales's Stakes G2 1985, Premio Presidente della Repubblica G1 1985

Creacking Board, Hollywood Starlet Stakes G1 1992

Prorutori, Derby Italiano G1 1989

Atoll, Italian Oaks G1 1990, Premio Regina Elena G2 1990, 2° Irish Oaks G1 1990

Candy Glen, Premio Parioli G1 1990, Gran Criterium G1 1989, Grand Prix Daphis G3

Southern Arrow, Premio Parioli G1 1984

Glory of Dancer, Dante Stakes G2 1996

Lucky Lionel, Prix Robert Papin G2 Norfolk S. G3 1995

Victory Piper, Beresford Stakes G2 1989

Future Storm, Baldwin Stakes G3 1993 Will Rogers H G3 1993

Softly Tread, Gladness Stakes G3 2001

Sheridan, Beresford Stakes G3 1993

Island Magic, Solario Stakes G3 1993

Arranvanna, Premio Regina Elena G2 1991

Treasure Hope, Italian 1000 ghinee G2 1992

Capo Nord, Premio Vittorio Di Capua G2 1985
