= Alan Munro (jockey) =

English jockey

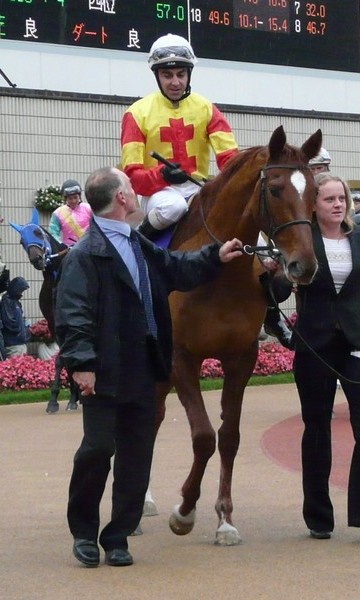

Personal information
- Born: 14 January 1967 (age 59)
- Occupation: Jockey

Horse racing career
- Sport: Horse racing

Major racing wins
- British Classic Races: Derby Stakes (1991); Other major races: British Champions Fillies' and Mares' Stakes (1991); Irish 2,000 Guineas (2006); Irish Derby (1991); King George VI and Queen Elizabeth Stakes (1991); Phoenix Stakes (1990); Prix d'Ispahan (1992); St. James's Palace Stakes (2006); Tattersalls Gold Cup (1991)

Significant horses
- Araafa, Generous, Mac's Imp
- Updated on 28 January 2022

Alan Munro (born 14 January 1967) is an English flat racing jockey.

He has won many major races including The Derby and the Irish Derby in 1991. He also rode Sergeant Cecil to win the Northumberland Plate, the Ebor Handicap and the Cesarewitch in the same season, a feat never achieved before.

== Major wins ==
(United Kingdom) Great Britain

- Derby – Generous (1991)
- King George VI and Queen Elizabeth Stakes – Generous (1991)
- St. James's Palace Stakes – Araafa (2006)

France

- Prix d'Ispahan – Zoman (1992)

Hong Kong

- Hong Kong Champions & Chater Cup) – Indigenous (1997)
- Hong Kong Gold Cup – Industrialist (2000)
- Queen Elizabeth II Cup – Industrialist (2000)

(Republic of Ireland) Ireland

- Irish 2,000 Guineas – Araafa (2006)
- Irish Derby – Generous (1991)
- Phoenix Stakes – Mac's Imp (1990)
- Tattersalls Gold Cup – Zoman (1991)

Italy

- Oaks d'Italia – Bright Generation (1993)
- Premio Lydia Tesio – Eva's Request (2009)
- Premio Presidente della Repubblica – Great Palm (1993)

United States

- Washington, D.C. International Stakes – Zoman (1992)
