= Willie Carson =

Scottish jockey (born 1942)

Willie Carson OBE
- Born: William Fisher Hunter Carson; 16 November 1942 (age 83); Stirling, Scotland
- Occupation: Jockey
- Spouses: Carol Spares (m. 1963; div. 1979) Elaine Williams (m. 1982)
- Children: 4

1000 Guineas (2)
1990
Salsabil	Heart Of Joy	Negligent
1991
Shadayid	Kooyonga	Crystal Gazing

2000 Guineas (4)
1972
High Top	Roberto	Sun Prince
1980
Nureyev	Known Fact	Posse
1987
Don't Forget Me	Bellotto	Midyan
1989
Nashwan	Exbourne	Danehill

Derby (4)
1979
Troy	Dickens Hill	Northern Baby
1980
Henbit	Master Willie	Rankin
1989
Nashwan	Terimon	Cacoethes
1994
Erhaab	King's Theatre	Colonel Collins

Oaks (4)
1977
Dunfermline	Freeze the Secret	Vaguely Deb
1980
Bireme	Vielle	The Dancer
1983
Sun Princess	Acclimatise	New Coins
1990
Salsabil	Game Plan	Knight's Baroness

St Leger (3)
1977
Dunfermline	Alleged	Classic Example
1983
Sun Princess	Esprit du Nord	Carlingford Castle
1988
Minster Son	Diminuendo	Sheriff's Star

William Fisher Hunter Carson (born 16 November 1942) is a Scottish retired Thoroughbred horse racing jockey. At only five feet tall and riding at an easily maintained weight of 7 stone 10 pounds (49 kg), Carson was much in demand as a jockey up to his retirement in 1996 at the age of 54.

== Life and career ==
Willie Carson was born in Stirling, Scotland, in 1942. He was apprenticed to Captain Gerald Armstrong at his stables at Tupgill, North Yorkshire. His first winner in Britain was Pinker's Pond in a seven-furlong apprentice handicap at Catterick Bridge Racecourse on 19 July 1962.

He was British champion jockey five times (1972, 1973, 1978, 1980 and 1983), won 17 British Classic Races and passed 100 winners in a season 23 times. His total of 3,828 wins makes him the fourth most successful jockey in Great Britain.

Carson's best season as a jockey came in 1990 when he rode 187 winners. This included six victories at Newcastle Racecourse on 30 June, making him one of only four jockeys to ride six winners at one meeting during the twentieth century. However, he came second in the 1990 jockeys' championship to Pat Eddery.

Carson had a long association with trainer Major Dick Hern, for whom he rode his first three Derby winners.

In 1980, Carson took over the Minster House Stud at Ampney Crucis near Cirencester and he and his wife Elaine have developed it into a state-of-the-art stud complex. He is the only known jockey since 1900 to have ridden a horse that he bred, Minster Son, to victory in one of the Classic races, the St Leger 1988. He and his then wife Carol had three sons Anthony, Neil and Ross.

In the 1983 New Years Honours List, Carson was made an Officer of the Order of the British Empire in the Civil Division for his services to horse racing. This entitled him to the Post Nominal Letters "OBE" for life.

From 1982 to 1983 Carson joined Bill Beaumont as one of the team captains for A Question of Sport. With Clare Balding, Carson co-presented BBC horse racing on BBC1 until the BBC ended their racing coverage at the end of the 2012 season.

He was chairman of Swindon Town FC from 2001 until August 2007.

In November 2010, he was awarded the Honorary degree of Doctor of Science (DSc) by the University of Chester.

In 2011, Carson came fifth in the eleventh series of ITV1's reality television show I'm a Celebrity...Get Me Out of Here!.

== Major wins ==
- 1,000 Guineas – (2) – Salsabil (1990), Shadayid (1993)
- 2,000 Guineas – (4) – High Top (1972), Known Fact (1980), Don't Forget Me (1987), Nashwan (1989)
- Ascot Gold Cup – (3) – Little Wolf (1983), Longboat (1986), Sadeem (1989)
- Champion Stakes – (1) – Rose Bowl (1975)
- Cork and Orrery Stakes (Diamond Jubilee Stakes) – (5) – Parsimony (1972), Swingtime (1975), Dafayna (1985), Danehill (1989), Atraf (1996)
- Derby – (4) – Troy (1979), Henbit (1980), Nashwan (1989), Erhaab (1994)
- Dewhurst Stakes – (3) – Prince of Dance (1988, dead heat), Dr Devious (1991), Alhaarth (1995)
- Eclipse Stakes – (3) – Ela-Mana-Mou (1980), Nashwan (1989), Elmaamul (1990)
- Falmouth Stakes – (2) – Cistus (1978), Rose Above (1979)
- Fillies' Mile – (2) – Quick As Lightning (1979), Aqaarid (1994)
- Haydock Sprint Cup – (3) – Boldboy (1977), Habibti (1983), Dayjur (1990)
- International Stakes – (3) – Relkino (1977), Troy (1979), Shady Heights (1988)
- July Cup – (2) – Habibti (1983), Hamas (1993)
- King George VI and Queen Elizabeth Stakes – (4) – Troy (1979), Ela-Mana-Mou (1980), Petoski (1985), Nashwan (1989)
- King's Stand Stakes – (3) – Habibti (1984), Chilibang (1988), Dayjur (1990)
- Lockinge Stakes – (2) – Relkino (1977), Wassl (1984, dead heat)
- Middle Park Stakes – (4) – Sharpen Up (1971), Known Fact (1979), Rodrigo de Triano (1991), Fard (1994)
- Nassau Stakes – (1) – Cistus (1978)
- Nunthorpe Stakes – (3) – Bay Express (1975), Habibti (1983), Dayjur (1990)
- Oaks – (4) – Dunfermline (1977), Bireme (1980), Sun Princess (1983), Salsabil (1990)
- Prince of Wales's Stakes – (4) – Ela-Mana-Mou (1980), Morcon (1984), Muhtarram (1994 & 1995)
- Queen Anne Stakes – (1) – Lahib (1992)
- Queen Elizabeth II Stakes – (8) – Rose Bowl (1975 & 1976), Trusted (1977), Homing (1978), Known Fact (1980), Teleprompter (1984), Lahib (1992), Bahri (1995)
- Racing Post Trophy – (3) – High Top (1971), Emmson (1987), Al Hareb (1988)
- St. James's Palace Stakes – (2) – Marju (1991), Bahri (1995)
- St. Leger – (3) – Dunfermline (1977), Sun Princess (1983), Minster Son (1988)
- Sun Chariot Stakes – (4) – Duboff (1975), Dusty Dollar (1986), Ristna (1991), Talented (1993)
- Sussex Stakes – (1) – Distant Relative (1990)
- Yorkshire Oaks – (5) – Dibidale (1974), Sun Princess (1983), Circus Plume (1984), Roseate Tern (1989), Hellenic (1990)

France

- Poule d'Essai des Pouliches – (1) – Ta Rib (1996)
- Prix de l'Abbaye de Longchamp – (2) – Habibti (1983), Dayjur (1990)
- Prix de Diane – (1) – Rafha (1990)
- Prix de la Forêt – (2) – Roan Star (1975), Salse (1988)
- Prix du Jockey Club – (1) – Policeman (1980)
- Prix Marcel Boussac – (3) – Ashayer (1987), Salsabil (1989), Shadayid (1990)
- Prix Morny – (1) – Deep Roots (1982)
- Prix de l'Opéra – (2) – Cistus (1978), Dione (1982)
- Prix Royal-Oak – (1) – Niniski (1979)
- Prix de la Salamandre – (1) – Deep Roots (1982, dead heat)
- Prix Vermeille – (1) – Salsabil (1990)

Germany

- Bayerisches Zuchtrennen – (2) – Highland Chieftain (1986), Shady Heights (1988)
- Grosser Preis von Baden – (1) – Sharper (1976)
- Grosser Preis von Berlin – (1) – First Lord (1978)
- Preis von Europa – (1) – Prince Ippi (1972)

(Republic of Ireland) Ireland

- Irish 1,000 Guineas – (2) – Mehthaaf (1994), Matiya (1996)
- Irish 2,000 Guineas – (1) – Don't Forget Me (1987)
- Irish Champion Stakes – (2) – Elmaamul (1990), Muhtarram (1993)
- Irish Derby – (2) – Troy (1979), Salsabil (1990)
- Irish Oaks – (4) – Dibidale (1974), Shoot A Line (1980), Swiftfoot (1982), Helen Street (1985)
- Irish St. Leger – (1) – Niniski (1979)
- Matron Stakes – (1) – Llyn Gwynant (1988)
- Tattersalls Gold Cup – (1) – Fair of the Furze (1986)

Italy

- Derby Italiano – (2) – Red Arrow (1976), Tommy Way (1986)
- Gran Criterium – (1) – Sanam (1986)
- Gran Premio di Milano – (2) – Tommy Way (1986), Alwuhush (1989)
- Oaks d'Italia – (1) – Miss Gris (1985)
- Premio Lydia Tesio – (1) – Oumaldaaya (1992)
- Premio Parioli – (1) – Alhijaz (1992)
- Premio Presidente della Repubblica – (3) – Jalmood (1983), Alwuhush (1989), Muhtarram (1994)
- Premio Roma – (2) – High Hawk (1983), Highland Chieftain (1989)
- Premio Vittorio di Capua – (2) – Alhijaz (1992 & 1993)

Sporting positions
Preceded by None	Hamdan Al Maktoum retained jockey Until 1997	Succeeded by Richard Hills
