= Gianfranco Dettori =

Italian jockey (born 1941)

Gianfranco Dettori (born 25 April 1941) is an Italian retired jockey.

Dettori was born in Serramanna, in what is now the Province of South Sardinia, son of a miner. He was thirteen times Italian champion jockey. He also had success in British Classic Races, winning the 2,000 Guineas in 1975 on the Henry Cecil-trained Bolkonski and in 1976 on Wollow, also trained by Cecil. In 1976 Wollow and Dettori went on to win Benson & Hedges Gold Cup and, when the first past the post was disqualified, the Eclipse Stakes.

He is the father of jockey Frankie Dettori.
