= Luciano Gaucci =

Italian entrepreneur, racehorse owner, and football executive (1938–2020)

- Born: December 28, 1938; Rome, Kingdom of Italy
- Died: February 1, 2020 (aged 81); Santo Domingo, Dominican Republic
- Occupations: Entrepreneur, sports executive, racehorse breeder
- Known for: Owner and chairman of A.C. Perugia Calcio, Catania FC, Viterbese, and Sambenedettese
- Spouse: Veronica del Bono (divorced)
- Children: 6, including Alessandro Gaucci and Riccardo Gaucci

Luciano Gaucci (28 December 1938 – 1 February 2020) was an Italian entrepreneur, sports executive, and thoroughbred racehorse owner best known as the president of A.C. Perugia Calcio from 1991 to 2004.

Under his presidency, Perugia enjoyed its most successful modern era, winning the 2003 UEFA Intertoto Cup, reaching the semi-finals of the 2002–03 Coppa Italia, and qualifying for the 2003–04 UEFA Cup. A pioneer of multi-club ownership in Italy, Gaucci simultaneously owned multiple professional teams, including Catania, Viterbese, and Sambenedettese. He was also a major figure in thoroughbred horse racing, breeding European champion Tony Bin.

== Early life and business career ==
Gaucci was born in Rome into a family of Marchigiano descent from Fermo. He began his working life in Rome as a tram driver for ATAC, later winning an internal competition to become an office employee within the municipal transit authority.

In 1975, Gaucci founded the cleaning company La Milanese. The firm grew into a major national contractor, securing maintenance contracts for public institutions, railway stations, and airports, including Milan Malpensa Airport.

Gaucci also acquired notable real estate properties, most famously purchasing the historic 13th-century Torre Alfina castle in Acquapendente, Lazio.

== Thoroughbred horse racing ==
In 1980, Gaucci founded the Allevamento White Star thoroughbred racing and breeding operation. He achieved international prominence in horse racing after purchasing a colt named Tony Bin for just 12 million lire. Under Gaucci's ownership, Tony Bin won major European races—accumulating 3 billion lire in prize money—and culminated in a victory at France's prestigious Prix de l'Arc de Triomphe in 1988. Gaucci subsequently sold the horse to Japanese breeders for a record sum of 7 billion lire.

Gaucci also owned Sikeston, a multiple European Group 1 winner, and Dr Devious, a colt he sold to American businessman Sid Craig, which went on to win England's 1992 Epsom Derby. Gaucci served as a board member of UNIRE (Unione Nazionale Incremento Razze Equine) until 1993.

== Football management ==
=== Early years and AS Roma ===
A lifelong fan of A.S. Roma, Gaucci became a minor shareholder in the club in 1975. In 1981, he joined Roma's board of directors under president Dino Viola, becoming the club's vice-president in 1984. Following Viola's temporary resignation in 1985 and his eventual death in 1991, Gaucci launched bids to acquire majority control of AS Roma, though control ultimately passed to Giuseppe Ciarrapico.

=== Perugia (1991–2004) ===
Having missed out on acquiring Roma, Gaucci purchased A.C. Perugia Calcio in 1991 while the club was competing in Serie C1. He oversaw a dramatic revival of the Umbrian club, leading them to promotion to Serie B in 1994, and securing two promotions to Serie A in 1996 and 1998.

Under Gaucci's tenure, Perugia became renowned for innovative scouting and high-profile international signings. Gaucci gained a reputation for acquiring unheralded foreign players or discovering talents in lower Italian leagues and selling them for substantial profits. Notable players brought to Perugia during his era included Japanese star Hidetoshi Nakata, World Cup winner Marco Materazzi, Fabio Grosso, Fabrizio Ravanelli, Zé Maria, Hidetoshi Nakata, and Ivan Kaviedes.

In 2000, Gaucci appointed an unknown lower-league manager, Serse Cosmi, who guided Perugia to a steady spell in Serie A. The club enjoyed its greatest European success under Cosmi and Gaucci, winning the 2003 UEFA Intertoto Cup against VfL Wolfsburg and qualifying for the 2003–04 UEFA Cup. Perugia also reached the semi-finals of the 2002–03 Coppa Italia, defeating A.C. Milan along the way.

=== Multi-club ownership pioneer ===
Gaucci was one of the earliest proponents of multi-club ownership in professional football. Alongside Perugia, he acquired controlling stakes in three other Italian teams:

- Viterbese(1997–2000): Achieved promotion to Serie C1. In 1999, Gaucci made international headlines by appointing Carolina Morace as head coach, making Viterbese the first professional men's football team in Europe to be coached by a woman.
- Catania(2000–2004): Acquired alongside his son Riccardo Gaucci, guiding the Sicilian club to promotion from Serie C1 to Serie B in 2002.
- Sambenedettese (2000–2004): Managed by his son Alessandro Gaucci, securing two promotions from Serie D to Serie C1.

In 2003, Gaucci gave retired player Stefano Colantuono his managerial debut at Sambenedettese and later Perugia, launching Colantuono's top-tier coaching career.

=== Publicity initiatives and player signings ===
Gaucci was famous for theatrical publicity initiatives and unconventional transfer targets:

- Libyan venture: In 2003, Gaucci signed Saadi Gaddafi, the son of Libyan leader Muammar Gaddafi, to a playing contract at Perugia.
- Female player proposals: Gaucci made multiple attempts to sign female players to Perugia's men's squad in Serie A, making official contract proposals to German World Cup winner Birgit Prinz and Swedish forward Hanna Ljungberg.

=== The Ahn Jung-hwan controversy ===
During the 2002 FIFA World Cup, South Korean international Ahn Jung-hwan—who was on loan at Perugia—scored the golden goal that eliminated Italy in the round of 16. In the immediate aftermath, an enraged Gaucci publicly declared he would terminate Ahn's contract, stating to the press: "I have no intention of paying a salary to someone who has ruined Italian football."

Although Gaucci quickly retracted his comments following global criticism and attempted to exercise Perugia's option to buy Ahn's contract outright, Ahn rejected the offer, with his agent stating he would never return to a club that had mounted a character assassination against him.

=== Attempted acquisition of Napoli (2004) ===
Following Perugia's relegation from Serie A in May 2004, Gaucci attempted to save insolvent Napoli from liquidation. He proposed a €46 million lease-to-buy plan for the club's business assets. However, the Italian Football Federation (FIGC) rejected the proposal as non-compliant with federal regulations (NOIF), leading to Napoli's bankruptcy and subsequent refoundation under Aurelio De Laurentiis.

== Legal issues, exile, and death ==
In 2005, A.C. Perugia Calcio accumulated severe financial debts and was declared bankrupt with liabilities exceeding €100 million. Italian magistrates opened a criminal investigation charging Gaucci and his sons, Alessandro and Riccardo, with fraudulent bankruptcy and tax evasion.

To avoid arrest, Gaucci fled Italy in late 2005 and settled in Santo Domingo, Dominican Republic, where he lived in exile for nearly four years. In November 2008, his lawyers reached a plea bargain with Italian prosecutors, resulting in a three-year suspended sentence, which was subsequently pardoned under Italy's 2006 general amnesty law (indulto).

After briefly returning to Italy in March 2009, Gaucci permanently returned to Santo Domingo, where he spent his final years. Suffering from Alzheimer's disease in his later years, he died in Santo Domingo on 1 February 2020 at the age of 81, and was buried there according to his wishes.

== Personal life ==
Gaucci fathered six children across four relationships. His eldest sons from his first marriage to Veronica del Bono, Alessandro Gaucci and Riccardo Gaucci, both served as sports executives during and after their father's ownership of Perugia, Catania, and Sambenedettese.

From 2000 to 2005, Gaucci was in a high-profile media relationship with Elisabetta Tulliani.

== Honours ==
=== As Owner/Chairman ===
Perugia

- UEFA Intertoto Cup: 2003
- Serie B promotion: 1995–96, 1997–98
- Serie C1: 1993–94 (Girone B)

Viterbese

- Serie C2: 1998–99

Catania

- Serie C1 promotion: 2001–02

Sambenedettese

- Serie D: 2000–01
- Serie C2 promotion: 2001–02

=== As Thoroughbred Owner ===
- Prix de l'Arc de Triomphe: Tony Bin (1988)

== Bibliography ==
- Colombo, Giancarlo (2001). Who's Who in Italy 2001. Bresso: Who's Who in Italy. ISBN 978-8885246447.
- Liguori, Mimmo; Napolitano, Sergio (2004). Il pallone nel burrone. Come i maggiori imprenditori italiani hanno portato il calcio al crac. Rome: Editori Riuniti. ISBN 978-8835955375.
