= Hippodrome of San Siro =

Horse racing venue in Milan

Coordinates: 45°28′57″N 09°07′50″E

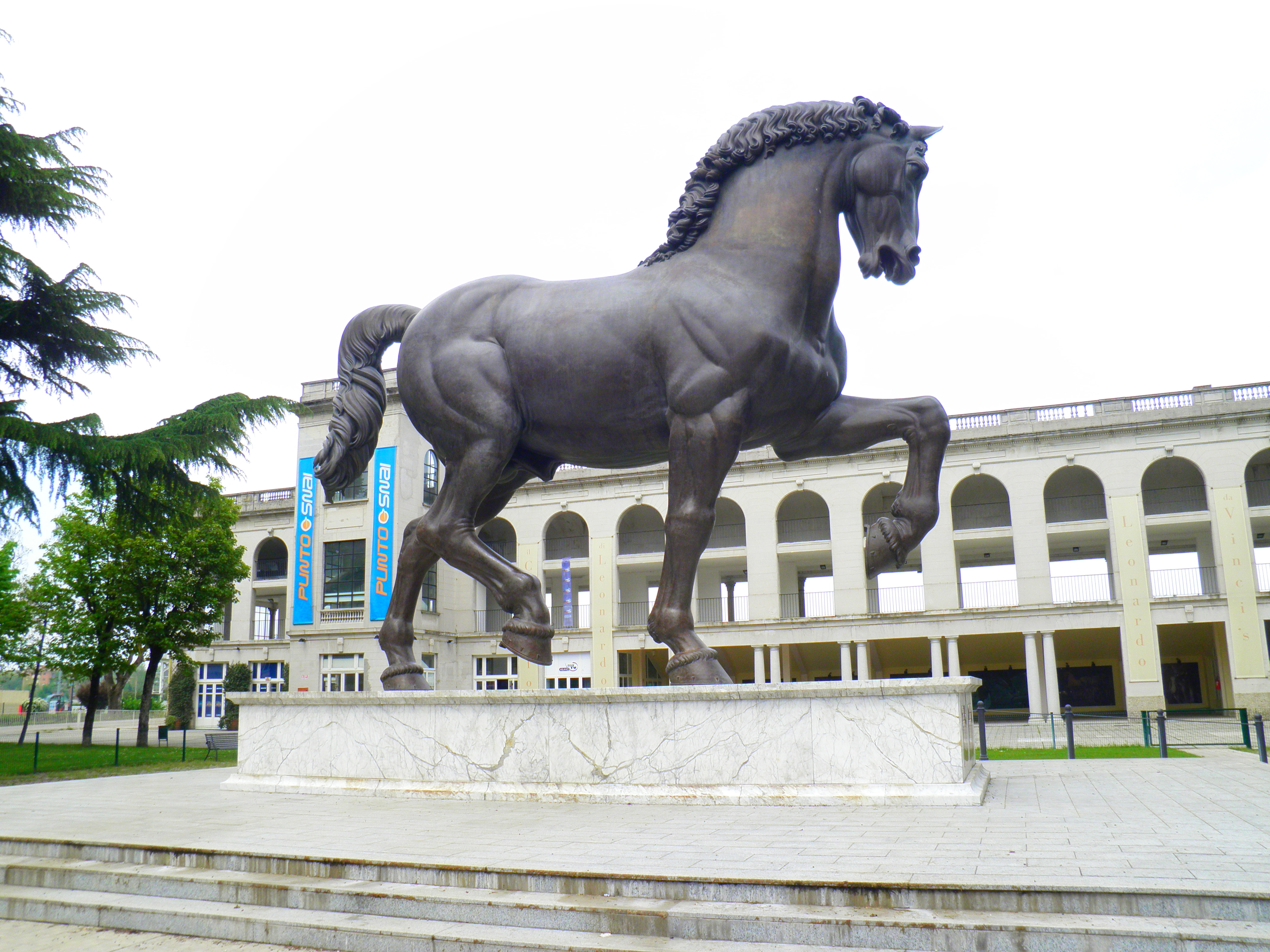
- The statue of Leonardo's horse, which is located in front of the Hippodrome of San Siro
- Location: Milan, Italy
- Owned by: Snaitech
- Date opened: 25 July 1920
- Capacity: 15,000 spectators
- Course type: Flat

The Hippodrome of San Siro (Italian: Ippodromo di San Siro) is a horse racing venue in Milan, Italy, which takes its name from the neighborhood of the same name in which it is located.

== History ==
Designed in 1913 to replace the then-used Trotter in Via Padova, the Hippodrome of San Siro was inaugurated on 25 July 1920, with its construction work being slowed down due to the World War I. In 1999 a statue of Leonardo's horse was placed in the square in front of the racecourse. Together with the San Siro stadium and the PalaLido it constitutes the sports citadel of Milan. It is owned by Snaitech.

== Features ==
The area on which the racecourse extends is 1,399,912 m^{2} (15,068,530 sq ft), of which 45,000 m^{2} (480,000 sq ft) are intended for the public, 447,610 m^{2} (4,818,000 sq ft) to the running track, 663,350 m^{2} (7,140,200 sq ft) to the training track, 99,000 m^{2} (1,070,000 sq ft) to the stables and 144,000 m^{2} (1,550,000 sq ft) to various destinations. The straight track develops a length of more than 1,830 m (6,000 ft). The racecourse can accommodate 15,000 spectators, of which 2,200 with seats.

== Races ==
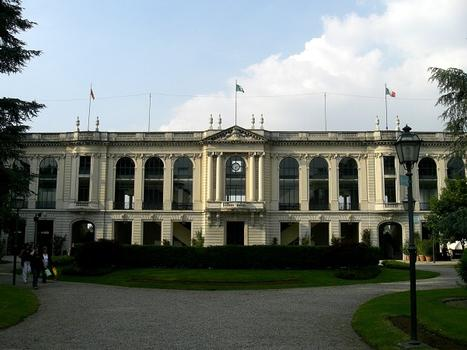
The facade of the Hippodrome of San Siro

Group 2 races include the Oaks d'Italia, Gran Premio di Milano, Premio Federico Tesio, Premio Vittorio di Capua, Gran Criterium, Gran Premio del Jockey Club and Premio Dormello. Group 3 races include the Premio Carlo Vittadini, Premio Primi Passi, Premio del Giubileo, Premio Elena e Sergio Cumani, Premio Verziere, Premio del Piazzale and St. Leger Italiano.

== See also ==
- Hippodrome
- Leonardo's horse
- PalaLido
- San Siro
- San Siro, Milan
