= Dylan Mouth =

Irish-bred Thoroughbred racehorse

- Racing silks of Scuderia Effevi
- Sire: Dylan Thomas
- Grandsire: Danehill
- Dam: Cottonmouth
- Damsire: Noverre
- Sex: Colt
- Foaled: 13 March 2011
- Country: Ireland
- Colour: Bay
- Breeder: Azienda Agricola Mariano
- Owner: Scuderia Effevi; Earle I. Mack
- Trainer: Stefano Botti; Marco Botti
- Record: 31: 14-3-3
- Earnings: £949,476

Major wins
- Premio Emanuele Filiberto (2014); Derby Italiano (2014); Premio Federico Tesio (2014, 2015); Gran Premio del Jockey Club (2014); Premio Carlo d'Alessio (2015); Gran Premio di Milano (2015, 2016); Premio Roma (2015); Old Newton Cup (2017); John Smith's Silver Cup Stakes (2018)
- Last updated on 16 July 2018

Dylan Mouth (foaled 13 March 2011) is an Irish-bred, Thoroughbred racehorse who was trained in Italy and England. After winning both of his races as a juvenile he improved to become the best horse of his generation in Italy, taking the Premio Emanuele Filiberto, Derby Italiano Premio Federico Tesio and Gran Premio del Jockey Club. In 2015 he won the Premio Carlo d'Alessio, Gran Premio di Milano, Premio Federico Tesio and Premio Roma. After being transferred to race in England in 2106 he won a second Gran Premio di Milano but failed to reproduce his best form in his subsequent races that year. He went on to win the Old Newton Cup in 2017 and the John Smith's Silver Cup Stakes in 2018 before being retired to stud.

== Background ==
Dylan Mouth is a bay horse bred in Ireland by the Italian breeding company Azienda Agricola Mariano. Dylan Mouth was sent into training with Stefano Botti in Italy. He was ridden in the majority of his early races by Fabio Branca.

He was sired by Dylan Thomas, who won the King George VI and Queen Elizabeth Stakes and the Prix de l'Arc de Triomphe in 2007. His dam Cottonmouth showed good racing form in Italy, winning at least five races in Italy including the Group 3 Premio Verziere in 2009. She was a great-granddaughter of Nilmeen, a half-sister to the dam of Shergar.

== Racing career ==
=== 2013: two-year-old season ===
Dylan Mouth made his racecourse debut in a maiden race over 1700 metres at the Capannelle Racecourse in Rome in October and won by four lengths. In November he followed up in the Premio Furigolo at the same course, beating Mewat by five lengths.

=== 2014: three-year-old season ===
Dylan Mouth began his second season in Rome, winning the Premio Lodi Vecchio in March and the Listed Premio Emanuele Filiberto in April. He was moved up in class in May for the Group Two Derby Italiano at San Siro Racecourse in May. He started the 2.1/1 favourite and took the lead in the lasr 50 metres to win by one and a half lengths from his stablemate Autre Qualite. He was then sent to England for the King Edward VII Stakes at Royal Ascot but failed to cope with the firm ground and finished unplaced behind Eagle Top.

In September, Dylan Mouth returned to Italy and won the Group Two Premio Federico Tesio, beating Biz The Nurse by three lengths. On his final appearance of the season he started odds-on favourite for the Group One Gran Premio del Jockey Club over 2400 metres at San Siro on 19 October. He took the lead 700 metres from the finish and won by four lengths from Duca di Mantova with a gap of fourteen lengths back to Biz The Nurse in third.

=== 2015: four-year-old season ===
On his debut as a four-year-old, Dylan Mouth started 1/5 favourite for the Group Three Premio Carlo d'Alessio at Capannelle and won by three lengths from Bertinoro. In the Group One Gran Premio di Milano on 7 June, he again started at long odds-on and won by five lengths from Billabong.

On his second venture outside Italy, Dylan Mouth was sent to England to contest the King George VI and Queen Elizabeth Stakes at Ascot. He finished last of the seven runners behind Postponed. In September he completed a second victory in the Premio Federico Tesio with a five length victory over Bertinoro. He ended the season in excellent form, finishing second in the Gran Premio del Jockey Club in October and winning the Premio Roma in November.

=== 2016: five-year-old season ===
For the 2016 season Dylan Mouth was transferred to England where he was trained by Stefano Botti's brother, Marco Botti, at Newmarket. On his first appearance of 2016 he was back in Italy and won the Gran Premio di Milano by five and a half lengths but on his second start of the season was beaten into tenth of eleven runners in the Grand Prix de Saint-Cloud. He was subsequently well beaten in the Grosser Preis von Baden and Gran Premio del Jockey Club.

=== 2017: six-year-old season ===
In the early part of 2017 Dylan Mouth was sent to race in Dubai and ran three times on turf at Meydan Racecourse, finishing second in the Jebel Ali Trophy and third in the Meydan Hotel before coming home fifth behind Prize Money in the Dubai City of Gold over 2400 metres on 4 March. On his return to Europe he finished seventh in the John Porter Stakes at Newbury Racecourse and was then stepped up in distance and finished third in a race over fourteen furlongs on the synthetic polytrack surface at Chelmsford City Racecourse on 10 May. After coming home seventh in the Grand Cup over the same distance at York Racecourse later that month he was dropped to handicap class for the Old Newton Cup over one and a half miles at Haydock Park on 8 July. Ridden by Harry Bentley he was assigned top weight of 136 pounds and started a 25/1 outsider in a sixteen-runner field. After being restrained in the early stages he "weaved" his way through the field, took the lead approaching the final furlong and won by two and a quarter lengths from Soldier In Action. Bentley commented: "He is a proper horse... he has done everything very well today. He's a big, solid horse so the weight's not been a problem. I got a good run through... It all went smoothly."

After his win at Haydock Dylan Mouth was leased by the American businessman Earle I. Mack with the intention of campaigning the horse in Australia. In his two remaining starts of 2017, the horse finished tenth in the Legacy Cup at Newbury and third in the Floodlit Stakes at Chelmsford on 6 November.

=== 2018: seven-year-old season ===
Dylan Mouth remained in Mack's ownership for the 2018 season. On his seasonal debut he came home last of the six runners behind Idaho in the Ormonde Stakes at Chester Racecourse in May and then finished runner-up to Second Step in the Fred Archer Stakes at Kempton Park Racecourse in June. On 12 July Dylan Mouth contested the Group 3 John Smith's Silver Cup Stakes over fourteen furlongs at York and went off the 8/1 fourth choice in a five-runner field. Ridden by Dane O'Neill he came from the back of the field to take the lead a furlong out and held off the challenge of the odds-on favourite Dal Harraild to win by a neck. On his final racecourse appearance, Dylan Mouth finished unplaced when carrying a weight of 136 pounds in the Ebor Handicap on 25 August.

== Stud record ==
At the end of the 2018 season Dylan Mouth was retired to become a National Hunt breeding stallion at the Worsall Grange Stud in North Yorkshire.

== Pedigree ==
Pedigree of Dylan Mouth (IRE), bay colt, 2011
| Sire Dylan Thomas (IRE) 2003 | Danehill (USA); 1986 | Danzig | Northern Dancer |
| Sire Dylan Thomas (IRE) 2003 | Danehill (USA); 1986 | Danzig | Pas de Nom |
| Sire Dylan Thomas (IRE) 2003 | Danehill (USA); 1986 | Razyana | His Majesty |
| Sire Dylan Thomas (IRE) 2003 | Danehill (USA); 1986 | Razyana | Spring Adieu |
| Sire Dylan Thomas (IRE) 2003 | Lagrion (USA); 1989 | Diesis | Sharpen Up |
| Sire Dylan Thomas (IRE) 2003 | Lagrion (USA); 1989 | Diesis | Doubly Sure |
| Sire Dylan Thomas (IRE) 2003 | Lagrion (USA); 1989 | Wrap It Up | Mount Hagen |
| Sire Dylan Thomas (IRE) 2003 | Lagrion (USA); 1989 | Wrap It Up | Doc Nan |
| Dam Cottonmouth (IRE) 2004 | Noverre (USA); 1998 | Rahy | Blushing Groom |
| Dam Cottonmouth (IRE) 2004 | Noverre (USA); 1998 | Rahy | Glorious Song |
| Dam Cottonmouth (IRE) 2004 | Noverre (USA); 1998 | Danseur Fabuleux | Northern Dancer |
| Dam Cottonmouth (IRE) 2004 | Noverre (USA); 1998 | Danseur Fabuleux | Fabuleux Jane |
| Dam Cottonmouth (IRE) 2004 | Nafzira (IRE); 1994 | Darshaan | Shirley Heights |
| Dam Cottonmouth (IRE) 2004 | Nafzira (IRE); 1994 | Darshaan | Delsy |
| Dam Cottonmouth (IRE) 2004 | Nafzira (IRE); 1994 | Nafzawa | Green Dancer |
| Dam Cottonmouth (IRE) 2004 | Nafzira (IRE); 1994 | Nafzawa | Nawazish (Family 9-c) |
