= List of Italian flat horse races =

A list of notable flat horse races which take place annually in Italy, including all conditions races which currently hold Group 2 or 3 status in the European Pattern.

== Group 2 ==
Month	Race Name	Racecourse	Dist. (m)	Age/Sex
May	Derby Italiano	Capannelle	2,200	3yo c&f
May / June	Oaks d'Italia	San Siro	2,200	3yo f
Sept / Oct	Premio Vittorio di Capua	San Siro	1,600	3yo+
October	Gran Premio del Jockey Club	San Siro	2,400	3yo+
October	Premio Dormello	San Siro	1,600	2yo f
Oct / Nov	Premio Lydia Tesio	Capannelle	2,000	3yo+ f
November	Premio Roma	Capannelle	2,000	3yo+

== Group 3 ==
Month	Race Name	Racecourse	Dist. (m)	Age/Sex
April	Premio Ambrosiano	San Siro	2,000	4yo+
April	Premio Parioli	Capannelle	1,600	3yo c
April / May	Premio Regina Elena	Capannelle	1,600	3yo f
May	Premio Presidente della Repubblica	Capannelle	1,800	4yo+
May / June	Premio Carlo Vittadini	San Siro	1,600	3yo+
June / July	Premio del Giubileo	San Siro	2,000	4yo+ f
June / July	Gran Premio di Milano	San Siro	2,000	3yo+
October	Premio Verziere	San Siro	2,000	3yo+ f
October	Gran Criterium	San Siro	1,500	2yo c&f
October	Premio del Piazzale	San Siro	1,600	3yo+
October	St. Leger Italiano	San Siro	3,000	3yo+
Oct / Nov	Premio Guido Berardelli	Capannelle	1,800	2yo
November	Premio Ribot	Capannelle	1,600	3yo+
November	Premio Federico Tesio	San Siro	2,200	3yo+

== Former Group races ==
Month	Race Name	Racecourse	Dist. (m)	Age/Sex
March / April	Premio Pisa	Pisa	1,600	3yo
April	Premio Carlo Chiesa	Capannelle	1,200	3yo+ f
April	Premio Natale di Roma	Capannelle	1,600	4yo+
April	Premio Emanuele Filiberto	San Siro	2,000	3yo
April / May	Premio Certosa	San Siro	1,000	3yo+
May	Coppa d'Oro di Milano	San Siro	3,000	4yo+
May	Premio Mario Incisa della Rocchetta	San Siro	2,000	3yo f
May / June	Premio Carlo d'Alessio	Capannelle	2,400	4yo+
June	Premio Tudini	Capannelle	1,200	3yo+
June	Criterium di Roma	Capannelle	1,200	2yo
June	Premio Royal Mares	San Siro	1,600	3yo+ f
June	Gran Premio d'Italia	San Siro	2,200	3yo
June / July	Premio Primi Passi	San Siro	1,200	2yo
July	Premio Baggio	San Siro	2,200	3yo+ f
July	Premio Citta di Napoli	Naples	1,000	3yo+
October	Premio Elena e Sergio Cumani	San Siro	1,600	3yo+ f
October	Premio Omenoni	San Siro	1,000	3yo+
October	Premio Carlo Porta	San Siro	2,000	3yo+
October	Premio Umbria	Capannelle	1,200	2yo+
November	Premio Roma Vecchia	Capannelle	2,800	3yo+
November	Premio Chiusura	San Siro	1,400	2yo+
