= Premio Tudini =

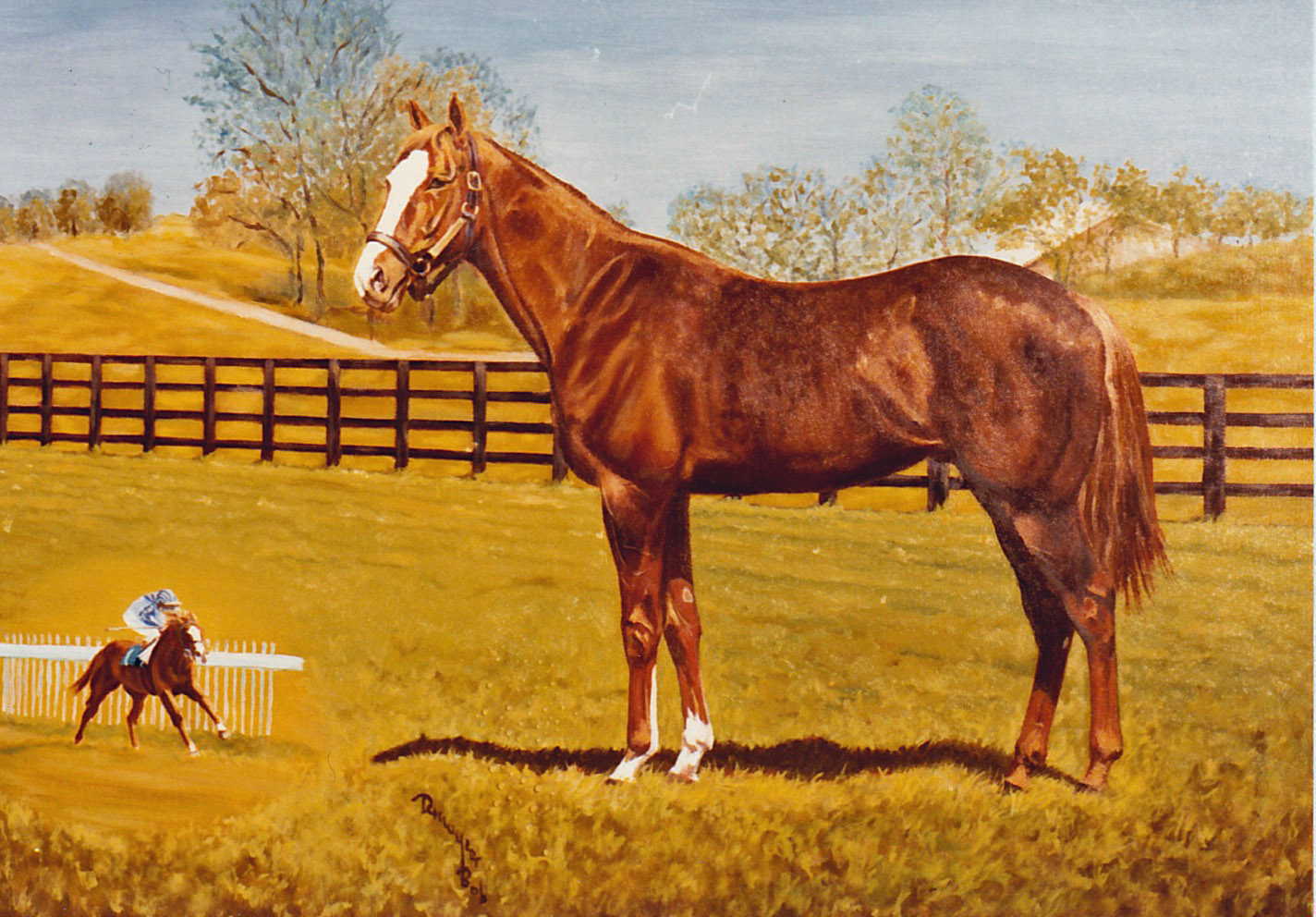
- Northjet, oil on canvas Painting by Bob Demuyser (1920-2003)
- Class: Listed
- Location: Capannelle Racecourse; Rome, Italy
- Race type: Flat / Thoroughbred
- Website: Capannelle

Race information
- Distance: 1,200 metres (6f)
- Surface: Turf
- Track: Straight
- Qualification: Three-years-old and up
- Weight: 53 kg (3yo); 57½ kg (4yo+); Allowances; 1½ kg for fillies and mares Penalties; 4½ kg for Group 1 winners * 3 kg for Group 2 winners * 2 kg for Group 3 winners * 2 kg if three Listed wins * 1 kg if two Listed wins * * since August 1 last year
- Purse: €88,000 (2011); 1st: €34,000

The Premio Tudini is a Listed flat horse race in Italy open to thoroughbreds aged three years or older. It is run at Capannelle over a distance of 1,200 metres (about 6 furlongs), and it is scheduled to take place each year in May.

The event was formerly known as the Premio Melton, and it held Group 3 status for a period in the 1970s. It was promoted to Group 2 level in 1979.

The Premio Melton was subtitled the Memorial Tudini during the 1990s. It was relegated back to Group 3 status in 1996. It was run as the Premio Tudini Piero e Ugo in the early 2000s, and it subsequently became the Premio Tudini.

The Premio Tudini is currently staged at the same meeting as the Derby Italiano.

== Records ==
Most successful horse since 1975:

- Tres Gate – 1981, 1982
- St Paul House – 2004, 2005

Leading jockey since 1987 (4 wins):

- Michael Kinane – Ginny Binny (1987), Edy Bedy (1988), Beat of Drums (1996), St Paul House (2004)

Leading trainer since 1987 (2 wins):

- Roberto Brogi – Fred Bongusto (1994), Per Incanto (2007)
- Armando Renzoni – Armando Carpio (1997), Kuaicoss (2006)
- Riccardo Menichetti - Pleasure Place (2003), United Color (2012)
- Daniele Camuffo - St Paul House (2004), Victory Laurel (2013)
- Vincenzo Fazio - Omaticaya (2014), Plusquemavie (2016)

== Winners since 1987 ==
Year	Winner	Age	Jockey	Trainer	Time
1987	Ginny Binny	4	Michael Kinane	V. Zuco	1:09.4
1988	Edy Bedy	3	Michael Kinane	not found	1:11.9
1989	Astronef	5	Eric Saint-Martin	Robert Collet	1:08.7
1990	Piero Gardino	5	Giorgio Pucciatti	not found	1:11.0
1991	Rufina	3	Fernando Jovine	Lorenzo Brogi	1:08.6
1992	Dream Talk	5	Olivier Peslier	Nicolas Clément	1:08.8
1993	Secret Thing	4	Vincenzo Mezzatesta	Fabio Brogi	1:09.6
1994	Fred Bongusto	3	Michael Roberts	Roberto Brogi	1:08.9
1995	Hever Golf Rose	4	Jason Weaver	Joe Naughton	1:10.8
1996	Beat of Drums	5	Michael Kinane	Giuseppe Botti	1:10.7
1997	Armando Carpio	4	Jacqueline Freda	Armando Renzoni	1:08.1
1998	Plumbird	4	Otello Fancera	Alberto Calchetti	1:08.2
1999	Su Tirolesu	3	Armando Corniani	Giampiero Ligas	1:08.8
2000	Barrow Creek	6	Terence Hellier	Peter Schiergen	1:08.9
2001	Indian Mary	4	Alessandro Parravani	Mario Ciciarelli	1:08.7
2002	Oh Bej Oh Bej	4	Massimiliano Tellini	Maurizio Guarnieri	1:08.7
2003	Pleasure Place	3	Dario Vargiu	Riccardo Menichetti	1:08.8
2004	St Paul House	6	Michael Kinane	Daniele Camuffo	1:08.5
2005	St Paul House	7	Paolo Aragoni	Giuseppe di Chio	1:08.6
2006	Kuaicoss	4	Massimiliano Tellini	Armando Renzoni	1:09.0
2007	Per Incanto	3	Gabriele Bietolini	Roberto Brogi	1:08.6
2008 (dh)	Gesture; Titus Shadow	6; 4	Stefano Landi; Dario Vargiu	Corrado di Stasio; Bruno Grizzetti	1:08.9
2009	Remarque	4	Christophe Soumillon	Luigi Riccardi	1:07.8
2010	Charming Woman	3	Mirco Demuro	Vittorio Caruso	1:10.7
2011	Spirit Quartz	3	Carlo Fiocchi	Devis Grilli	1:08.1
2012	United Color	3	Carlo Fiocchi	Riccardo Menichetti	1:09.0
2013	Victory Laurel	3	Salvatore Sulas	Daniele Camuffo	1:08.54
2014	Omaticaya	3	Gianpasquale Fois	Vincenzo Fazio	1:07.96
2015	Falest	6	Federico Bossa	Domenico Crisanti	1:07.58
2016	Plusquemavie	5	Gianpasquale Fois	Vincenzo Fazio	1:07.43
2017	Trust You	5	Silvano Mulas	Endo Botti	1:07.90
2018	My Lea	4	Carlo Fiocchi	Vincenzo Fazio	1:07.80
2019	Buonasera	4	Mario Sanna	P L Giannotti	1:10.70
2020	The Conqueror	5	Fabio Branca	Alessandro Botti	1:07.54
2021	Collinsbay	3	Salvatore Basile	Luciano Vitabile	1:06.80
2022	Agiato	5	Antonio Fresu	Grizzetti Galoppo	1:07.00
2025	Noble Title	5	Mario Sanna	Stefano Botti	1:06.50

== Earlier winners ==
- 1975: Red Gift
- 1976: Policrock
- 1977: Madang
- 1978: Dublin Taxi
- 1979: Tanfirion
- 1980: Northjet
- 1981: Tres Gate
- 1982: Tres Gate
- 1983: Snatch and Run
- 1984: Forzando
- 1985: Gaius
- 1986: Tinterosse

== See also ==
- List of Italian flat horse races
