= Pizza party =

Social gathering at which pizza is eaten

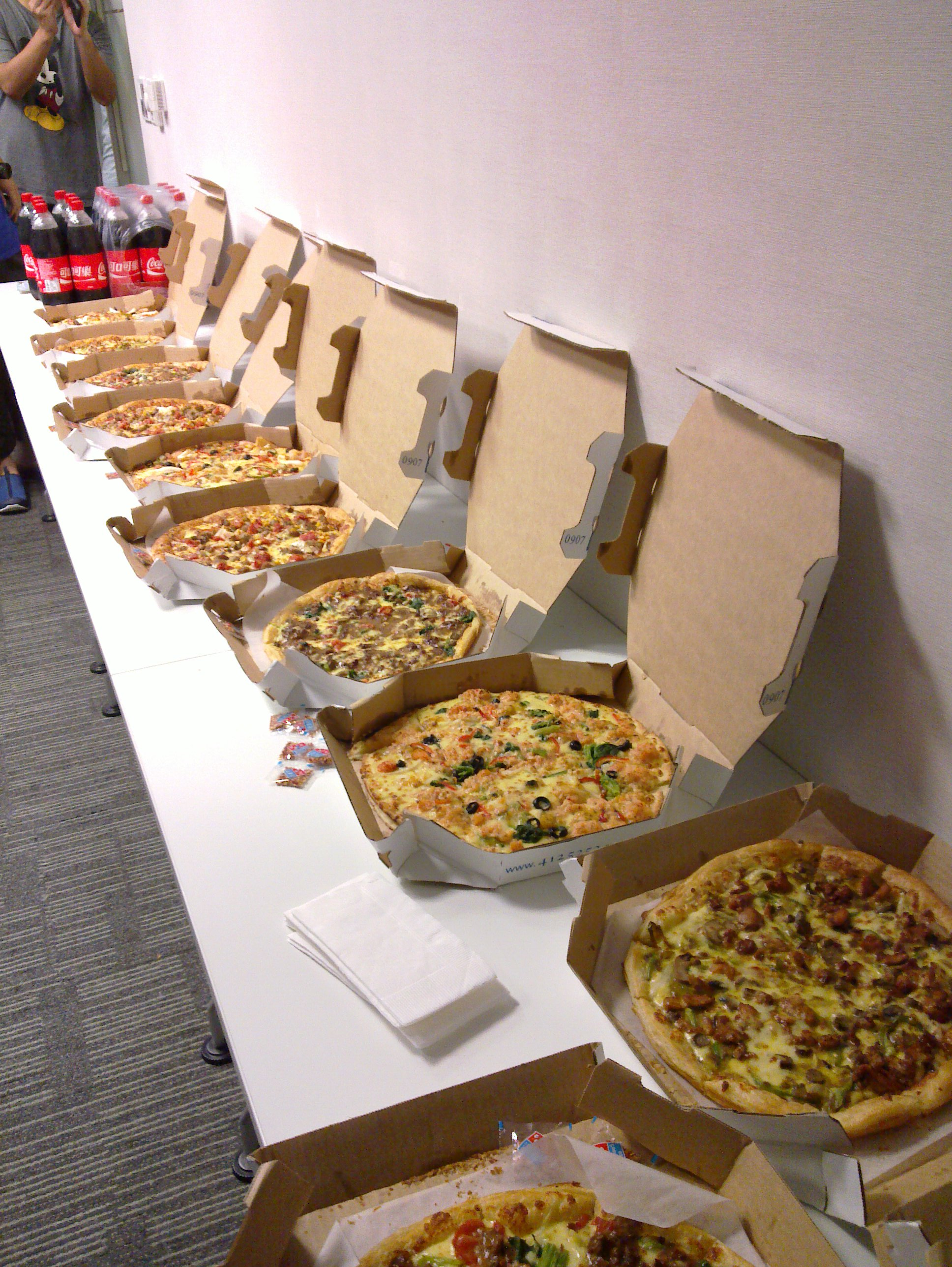
Pizzas at a pizza party

A pizza party is a social gathering where pizza is served as the main dish.

Since pizzas can include a very wide variety of toppings, one particular type of pizza party allows the guests to create their own custom-made pizza, using a selection of ingredients from among the toppings provided by the party's host.

When a pizza party does not include any custom-made pizzas, and the particular preferences of the guests are unknown, it is common to include at least one plain cheese-only and/or vegetable-only pizza for people who are averse to meats or other available toppings.

== Notable pizza parties ==
On September 8, 2019, one of the largest pizza parties was held at the Ippodromo Capannelle in Rome, where 1,146 people dined on pizza together.

On September 18, 2020, Hormel Foods hosted the world's then-largest virtual pizza party, when more than 3,000 people joined a Zoom-hosted pizza party. In order to break the record, at least 500 photos of individuals needed to be uploaded during the one-hour event. The final tally was 907 photos.

In August 2021, astronauts aboard the International Space Station held the very first pizza party in space, following a cargo shipment that included pizza-making ingredients.
