= Premio Omenoni =

- Class: Listed
- Location: San Siro Racecourse; Milan, Italy
- Race type: Flat / Thoroughbred
- Website: San Siro

Race information
- Distance: 1,000 metres (5f)
- Surface: Turf
- Track: Straight
- Qualification: Three-years-old and up
- Weight: 57 kg Allowances; 1½ kg for fillies and mares Penalties; 4½ kg for Group 1 winners * 3 kg for Group 2 winners * 2 kg for Group 3 winners * 2 kg if three Listed wins * 1 kg if two Listed wins * * since January 1
- Purse: €61,600 (2015); 1st: €23,800

The Premio Omenoni is a Listed flat horse race in Italy open to thoroughbreds aged three years or older. It is run at Milan over a distance of 1,000 metres (about 5 furlongs), and it is scheduled to take place each year in October. It was formerly contested at Group 3 level before being downgraded in 2016.

== Records ==
Most successful horse since 1986 (2 wins):

- Arranvanna – 1992, 1993
- Leap for Joy – 1995, 1996

Leading jockey since 1986 (3 wins):

- Fabio Branca - Dagda Mor (2011), Harlem Shake (2014), Intense Life (2016)

Leading trainer since 1986 (4 wins):

- Armando Renzoni – Arranvanna (1992, 1993), Armando Carpio (1997), Le Cadre Noir (2007)

== Winners since 1986 ==
Year	Winner	Age	Jockey	Trainer	Time
1986	Storm Warning	4	Tony Ives	William Hastings-Bass	0:57.60
1987	Agora	3	Marco Paganini	Lorenzo Brogi
1988	Barn Five South	4	Gianfranco Dettori	Luca Cumani	1:00.70
1989	Or Acier	3	Alain Lequeux	Robert Collet	0:57.70
1990	Fabulous Eden	4	Dragan Ilic	Peter Lautner	0:59.90
1991	Cardmania	5	Alain Badel	Myriam Bollack-Badel	0:58.80
1992	Arranvanna	4	Vincenzo Mezzatesta	Armando Renzoni	1:01.60
1993	Arranvanna	5	Jacqueline Freda	Armando Renzoni	1:02.00
1994	Palacegate Episode	4	John Carroll	Jack Berry	0:57.80
1995	Leap for Joy	3	Gary Hind	John Gosden	0:57.90
1996	Leap for Joy	4	Frankie Dettori	John Gosden	0:58.90
1997	Armando Carpio	4	Otello Fancera	Armando Renzoni	0:58.40
1998	Conte Grimaldi	3	Jorge Horcajada	Daniele Arienti	1:00.50
1999	Nuclear Debate	4	Darryll Holland	John Hammond	0:56.90
2000	Development	5	Jorge Horcajada	Luigi Mele	1:02.10
2001	Jessica's Dream	3	Frankie Dettori	James Given	1:00.60
2002	Kathy College	4	Mario Esposito	Antonio Peraino	0:59.10
2003	Pleasure Place	3	Dario Vargiu	Riccardo Menichetti	0:57.20
2004	Raffelberger	3	Andreas Suborics	Mario Hofer	0:58.50
2005	Krisman	6	Daniele Porcu	Mario Ciciarelli	0:59.30
2006	Champion Place	3	Mirco Demuro	Riccardo Menichetti	0:58.50
2007	Le Cadre Noir	3	Mirco Demuro	Armando Renzoni	0:57.40
2008	no race ^{[a]}
2009	Titus Shadow	5	Dario Vargiu	Bruno Grizzetti	0:59.30
2010	Jakor	4	Pierantonio Convertino	Mario Marcialis	1:01.10
2011	Dagda Mor	4	Fabio Branca	Stefano Botti	0:58.70
2012	Noble Hachy	3	Cristian Demuro	Luigi Riccardi	0:59.10
2013	Clorofilla	3	Luca Maniezzi	Marco Gasparini	1:01.60
2014	Harlem Shake	3	Fabio Branca	Marco Gasparini	1:01.20
2015	Lohit	4	Paolo Aragoni	Luigi Biagetti	1:03.10
2016	Intense Life	4	Fabio Branca	Endo Botti	0:59.30
2017	My Lea	3	Salvatore Basile	Vincenzo Fazio	0:59.50
2018	Ipompieridiviggiu	3	Fabio Branca	Grizzetti Galoppo	0:57.80
2019	Do It In Rio	5	Jack Mitchell	Tamara Richter	1:00.20

^{a} The 2008 running was cancelled because of a strike.

== See also ==
- List of Italian flat horse races
