= Brontë Cup =

Flat horse race in Britain

- Class: Group 3
- Location: York Racecourse; York, England
- Inaugurated: 2018; 8 years ago
- Race type: Flat / Thoroughbred
- Sponsor: William Hill
- Website: York

Race information
- Distance: 1m 5f 188y (2,787m)
- Surface: Turf
- Track: Left-handed
- Qualification: Four-years-old and up fillies & mares
- Purse: £100,000 (2025)

Bronte Cup Fillies' Stakes
2026
Danielle	Miss Alpilles	Desert Spring

Previous years
2025
Scenic	Term Of Endearment	Sueno
2024
Term Of Endearment	Night Sparkle	River Of Stars
2023
River Of Stars	Mimikyu	Voodoo Queen
2022
Believe In Love	Urban Artist	Glenartney
2021
Tribal Craft	Urban Artist	Makawee

2020-2018
2019
Dramatic Queen	Enbihaar	Bayshore Freeway
2018
Precious Ramotswe	Do Re Mi Fa Sol	Cribbs Causeway

The Brontë Cup Fillies' Stakes is a Group 3 flat horse race in Great Britain open to fillies and mares aged four years or older. It is run at York over a distance of 1 mile, 5 furlongs and 188 yards (2,787 metres), and is scheduled to take place each year in late May.

== History ==
The Brontë Cup was introduced in 2018 as part of the European Pattern Committee's commitment to improving the race programme for stayers in Europe.

The race is named in honour of the Brontë sisters.

== Winners ==
Year	Winner	Age	Jockey	Trainer	Time
2018	Precious Ramotswe	4	Robert Havlin	John Gosden	3:05.63
2019	Dramatic Queen	4	Daniel Tudhope	William Haggas	2:55.35
	no race 2020 (Note: The 2020 running was cancelled because of the COVID-19 pandemic in the United Kingdom)
2021	Tribal Craft	5	David Probert	Andrew Balding	3:06.86
2022	Believe In Love	5	Ray Dawson	Andrew Balding	3:06.16
2023	River of Stars	4	Rossa Ryan	Ralph Beckett	2:58.13
2024	Term Of Endearment	5	Rachael Blackmore	Henry de Bromhead	3:01.29
2025	Scenic	5	Saffie Osborne	Ed Walker	2:57.70
2026	Danielle	5	Robert Havlin	John & Thady Gosden	3:07.91

== See also ==
- Horse racing in Great Britain
- List of British flat horse races
