= Coppa d'Oro di Milano =

Horse race in Italy

- Class: Listed
- Location: San Siro Racecourse; Milan, Italy
- Race type: Flat / Thoroughbred
- Website: San Siro

Race information
- Distance: 3,000 metres (1 7/8 miles)
- Surface: Turf
- Track: Right-handed
- Qualification: Four-years-old and up exc. G1 / G2 winners this year and triple Listed winners
- Weight: 55.5 kg Allowances; 1.5 kg for fillies and mares Penalties; 4 kg for Group 1 winners * 3 kg for Group 2 winners * 2 kg if G1 / G2 placed * 2 kg for Group 3 winners * 2 kg if two Listed wins * 1 kg if Group 3 placed * 1 kg if one Listed win * * within last year
- Purse: €41,800 (2012); 1st: €16,150

The Coppa d'Oro di Milano is a Listed flat horse race in Italy open to thoroughbreds aged four years or older. It is run over a distance of 3,000 metres (about 1 7/8 miles) at Milan in May.

== History ==
The event was formerly classed at Group 3 level. For a period it was restricted to horses aged four or older. The minimum age was lowered to three in 1995. It was run as an ungraded handicap from 1996 to 2002.

The Coppa d'Oro di Milano reverted to being a conditions race in 2003. From this point it held Listed status. It was closed to three-year-olds in 2007.

The race is currently staged at the same meeting as the Oaks d'Italia.

== Records ==
Most successful horse since 1987 (2 wins):

- Drum Taps – 1992, 1993
- Pay Me Back – 1997, 1998
- Montalegre – 2006, 2007
- Caudillo - 2012, 2013
- Trip To Rhodes - 2014, 2016

Leading jockey since 1987 (4 wins):

- Sergio Dettori – Damascus Regal (1988), Steve Lucky (1996), Pay Me Back (1997, 1998)

Leading trainer since 1987 (4 wins):

- Bruno Grizzetti – Jar (1999), London Bank (2001), Storm Mountain (2009), Frankenstein (2011)

== Winners since 1987 ==
Year	Winner	Age	Jockey	Trainer	Time
1987	Love Letter	6	Andrzej Tylicki	Heinz Jentzsch	3:28.40
1988	Damascus Regal	4	Sergio Dettori	Luciano d'Auria	3:13.90
1989	Katoleme	5	Tony Cruz	Kurt Schafflützel	3:27.90
1990	Jung	6	Marco Paganini	Lorenzo Brogi	3:25.80
1991	Per Quod	6	Gianfranco Dettori	Ben Hanbury	3:13.60
1992	Drum Taps	6	Frankie Dettori	Lord Huntingdon	3:10.40
1993	Drum Taps	7	John Reid	Lord Huntingdon	3:15.90
1994	Tioman Island	4	Steve Perks	Paul Cole	3:14.60
1995	Khamaseen	4	John Reid	John Dunlop	3:22.60
1996	Steve Lucky	6	Sergio Dettori	Antonio Aiello	3:25.50
1997	Pay Me Back	7	Sergio Dettori	Gianfranco Verricelli	3:11.60
1998	Pay Me Back	8	Sergio Dettori	Gianfranco Verricelli	3:15.00
1999	Jar	4	Olivier Peslier	Bruno Grizzetti	3:09.10
2000	Cauchemar de Chat	5	Fernando Jovine	Luigi Batzella	3:08.80
2001	London Bank	5	Mirco Demuro	Bruno Grizzetti	3:17.30
2002	Hopes Are High	6	Marco Monteriso	Federico Kronauer	3:11.00
2003	Tomster	5	Jiri Palik	Wilfried Kujath	3:14.60
2004	Swing Wing	5	Darryll Holland	Paul Cole	3:11.70
2005	Rhodesian Winner	6	Edmondo Botti	Marion Rotering	3:18.80
2006	Montalegre	4	Edmondo Botti	A. Botti / G. Botti	3:21.60
2007	Montalegre	5	Dario Vargiu	A. Botti / G. Botti	3:17.40
2008	Ryan	5	Rastislav Juracek	Jaroslav Hanacek	3:07.30
2009	Storm Mountain	6	Sergio Urru	Bruno Grizzetti	3:08.40
2010	Brusco	4	Eduardo Pedroza	Andreas Wöhler	3:09.10
2011	Frankenstein	4	Dario Vargiu	Bruno Grizzetti	3:12.40
2012	Caudillo	9	Luca Maniezzi	Dr Andreas Bolte	3:09.90
2013	Caudillo	10	Luca Maniezzi	Dr Andreas Bolte	3:17.50
2014	Trip To Rhodos	5	Cristian Demuro	Pavel Tuma	3:12.50
2015	Victory Song	5	Luca Maniezzi	Wolfgange Figge	3:19.70
2016	Trip To Rhodos	7	Cristian Demuro	Pavel Tuma	3:16.10
2017	Trip To Rhodos	8	Stephane Breux	Pavel Tuma	3:28.20
2018	Chasedown	4		Alessandro Botti	3:10.30
2019	Mixology	6	Mario Sanna	Riccardo Pinzauti	3:15.50

== See also ==
- List of Italian flat horse races
