= Peter Hedger =

British racehorse trainer (c.1940–2022)

Peter Hedger (c. 1940 – 4 December 2022) was a British horse trainer who trained horses which competed in both Flat racing and National Hunt racing.

Hedger began a career as an apprentice jockey but was forced to give up riding after a serious fall in 1965. He subsequently worked as a horsebox driver before taking out a permit to train his own horses at his stable near Chichester in 1981. In 1989 he took out a full training licence, which allowed him to train horses for other people, and continued training until moving to France in 2006. He returned to Britain in 2009 and resumed training from a stable in Hampshire before his final retirement in 2020.

His biggest training victory came in 1991 when Al Asoof won the National Spirit Hurdle and other major successes came in the John Smith's Silver Cup Stakes and Great Jubilee Handicap. Hedger died in December 2022, at the age of 82. Former jockey Leighton Aspell paid tribute to him, saying "I have very fond memories of Peter, he was a really good guy. He brought a fun element to it but he knew exactly what he had in his hands."
