= Old Newton Cup =

- Class: Handicap
- Location: Haydock Park; Haydock, England
- Race type: Flat / Thoroughbred
- Sponsor: Bet365
- Website: Haydock Park

Race information
- Distance: 1m 3f 175y (2,373 m)
- Surface: Turf
- Track: Left-handed
- Qualification: Four-years-old and up
- Weight: Handicap
- Purse: £150,000 (2025); 1st: £77,310

Old Newton Cup
2026
Sportingsilvermine	Paddy The Squire	Night Breeze

Previous years
2025
Plage De Havre	Paddy The Squire	Night Breeze
2023
Wootton'sun	Scampi	Cumulonimbus
2022
Get Shirty	Enfranchise	Gaassee
2021
Alounak	Win O'Clock	My Frankel

2020-2011
2020
Deja	Laafy	The Trader
2019
Kelly's Dino	Lucius Tiberius	Epaulement
2018
Rainbow Rebel	Crowned Eagle	Atty Persse
2017
Dylan Mouth	Soldier In Action	Shraaoh
2016
Tawdeea	Gold Prince	Desert Encounter
2015
Notarised	Watersmeet	Farquhar
2014
De Rigueur	Pallasator	Magic Hurricane
2013
Star Lahib	Tepmokea	Fennell Bay
2012
Number Theory	Quiz Mistress	Tepmokea
2011
Halicarnassus	Bourne	Bowdler's Magic

2010-2001
2010
Dangerous Midge	Demolition	Fiery Lad
2009
Red Merlin	Munsef	Mezzanisi
2008
Mad Rush	Young Mick	Camps Bay
2007
Dansili Dancer	Futun	Misty Dancer
2006
Consular	Ouninpohja	Star of Light
2005
Zeitgeist	Red Lancer	Resonate
2004
Alkaased	Crow Wood	Grampian
2003
Collier Hill	Waverley	Counsel's Opinion
2002
Sun Bird	Barathea Blazer	Court Shareef
2001
Hannibal Lad	Steel Band	Cracow

2000-1991
2000
Rada's Daughter	Alva Glen	Arabian Moon
1999
Celestial Welcome	Hill Farm Blues	She's Our Mare
1998
Perfect Paradigm	Bay Of Islands	Fantail
1997
Zaralaska	My Learned Friend	Raffles Rooster
1996
Key To My Heart	Royal Scimitar	Nabhaan
1995
Lombardic	Diaghilef	Shadow Leader
1994
Glide Path	Tree Of Life	Boloardo
1993
Glide Path	Highflying	Turgenev
1992
Matador	Quick Ransom	Secret Society
1991
Libk	Hawait Al Barr	Lift And Load

1990-1988
1990
Hateel	Cambo	Afkar
1989
Nickle Plated	Cheerful Times	Stratford Ponds
1988
Roushayd	Ile De Chypre	Vouchsafe

The Old Newton Cup is a flat Handicap horse race in Great Britain open to horses of four-year-old and up. It is run at Haydock over a distance of 1 mile 3 furlongs and 175 yards (2,373 metres), and it is scheduled to take place each year in July.

The race has been won by several top-class horses including Collier Hill, Alkaased, Dangerous Midge and Dylan Mouth.

== Winners since 1900 ==
Year	Winner	Age	Weight	Jockey	Trainer	Time
1900	King's Courier	3	08-05	Lester Reiff	Charles Morton
1901	Syerla	7	09-01	Johnny Reiff	Reg Day
1902	Candelaria	8	07-10	Thomas Dixon	Thomas
1903
1904	Whistling Crow	4	07-09	Reginald Jones	Felix Leach
1905	Thunderbolt	5	09-00	Danny Maher	Harry Bates
1906	Kilwinning	4	06-12	Joseph Plant	Harry Sadler
1907	Wise Mason	3	06-02	James Howard	Harry Sadler
1908	Blundella	4	06-04	Charles Ringstead	Nathan Scott
1909	Queen's Advocate	5	08-04	Billy Higgs	Doyle
1910	Macedoine	5	06-06	Robert Mason	Matthew Peacock
1911	Count Oso	4	06-08	Charles Ringstead	William Yapp
1912	Demosthenes	5	08-09	Herbert Jones	Felix Leach
1913	Queensland	3	07-07	Charlie Foy	Reg Day
1914	Boots	3	06-07	Kenneth Robertson	Harry Sadler
1915–18	No Race
1919	Loaf Sugar	4	07-02	Arthur Flanagan	Robert Armstrong
1920	Rock Drill	4	07-07	Kenneth Robertson	Renwick
1921	Little Nan	7	07-05	Joseph Rose	Walter Griggs
1922	Irish Belfry	3	07-09	Harry Wragg	Robert Colling
1923	Sun Charmer	4	08-02	Harry Wragg	Robert Colling
1924	Sierra Leone	4	08-03	Tommy Weston	George Lambton
1925	Winalot	4	09-00	Henri Jellis	Fred Leader
1926	Castlederg	4	07-02	William Alford	Whitelaw	2:31.40
1927	San Vincente	4	07-06	Freddie Fox	Captain Richard Gooch
1928	Polyanthus	4	06-10	Albert Richardson	Matthew Peacock
1929	Gipsy King	5	08-09	Jack Leach	Michell
1930	Grease Paint	4	08-12	Bernard Carslake	Norman Scobie
1931	North Drift	4	07-12	Sam Wragg	Fred Vasey
1932	Grease Paint	6	07-09	Archie Burns	Norman Scobie
1933	Light O' Love	5	07-12	Tommy Weston	Colledge Leader	2:32.20
1934	Highlander	4	08-08	Tommy Weston	Colledge Leader
1935	R. B. Bennett	6	08-04	Tommy Weston	James Russell
1936	Pegomas	5	07-13	Harry Carr	Billy Carr	2:28.60
1937	Pegomas	6	08-10	Billy Nevett	Billy Carr	2:29.20
1938	Gothic	4	08-12	Billy Nevett	Percy Whitaker	2:38.20
1939	Boro Boudour	5	08-10	Georgie Wells	James Russell	2:35.80
1940–46	No Race
1947	Auralia	4	09-03	Doug Smith	Reg Day	2:33.00
1948	Preciptic	6	09-07	Charlie Smirke	Sam Armstrong	2:30.60
1949	Tsaoko	4	08-07	Edgar Britt	Sam Armstrong	2:29.80
1950	Courier	4	08-12	Edgar Britt	Sam Armstrong	2:27.60
1951	Saturn	4	09-07	Doug Smith	George Colling	2:28.20
1952	Tufthunter	4	08-10	Bill Evans	Norman Bertie	2:30.40
1953	Galatian	6	09-04	Tommy Gosling	(In Ireland)	2:30.40
1954	Penitent	5	09-01	Davy Jones	Pat Taylor	2:32.40
1955	Double Bore	4	08-03	Willie Snaith	Jeremy Tree	2:34.20
1956	Manati	4	08-06	Harry Carr	Cecil Boyd-Rochfort	2:31.40
1957	Rhythmic Light	3	07-03	Peter Robinson	Staff Ingham	2:28.80
1958	Huguenot	4	09-00	Manny Mercer	George Colling	2:39.20
1959	Mongoose	4	07-13	Eddie Hide	Charles Elsey	2:27.80
1960	Apostle	3	08-03	Eddie Hide	Staff Ingham	2:30.60
1961	Menelek	4	08-04	Tony Rawlinson	Geoffrey Brooke	2:26.00
1962	Cloudy Wyn	4	07-13	Lionel Brown	Peter Easterby	2:26.80
1963	Young Lochinvar	4	08-12	Bill Williamson	Harry Wragg	2:35.20
1964	Rapanni	5	07-03	Peter Hetherington	George Boyd	2:26.60
1965	Atilla	4	07-03	Taffy Thomas	Harry Wragg	2:26.20
1966	Ballywit	4	07-04	Derek Morris	Arthur Budgett	2:30.60
1967	French Vine	3	07-07	Des Cullen	Bill Elsey	2:31.40
1968	Tiber	4	08-09	Jimmy Lindley	Jeremy Tree	2:33.24
1969	Pharaoh Hophra	5	07-11	Ernie Johnson	Frank Cundell	2:30.20
1970	New Member	5	08-02	Willie Carson	Fred Armstrong	2:26.50
1971	Wabash	4	08-02	Willie McCaskill	Denys Smith	2:29.76
1972	Private Walk	5	07-09	Alan Cousins	Herbert Blagrave	2:36.50
1973	Private Walk	6	07-10	Brian Jago	Herbert Blagrave	2:32.95
1974	Belper	5	08-05	Richard Hutchinson	John Dunlop	2:34.63
1975	Fool's Mate	4	09-02	Alan Bond	Henry Cecil	2:32.46
1976	Peaceful	5	09-00	Steve Raymont	Jeremy Tree	2:34.06
1977	Mint	3	07-07	John Lowe	Bill Elsey	2:35.46
1978	Move Off	5	09-04	Kevin Darley	Jack Calvert	2:40.04
1979	St Briavels	5	09-03	John Reid	Gavin Pritchard Gordon	2:32.36
1980	Shady Nook	5	09-05	Steve Raymont	Herbert Blagrave	2:38.24
1981	Dogberry	3	07-05	Bryn Crossley	Harry Wragg	2:28.94
1982	Valentinian	4	10-03	Willie Carson	Dick Hern	2:36.90
1983	Regal Steel	5	08-02	Paul Eddery	Reg Hollinshead	2:31.37
1984	Bishop Ring	3	08-06	Walter Swinburn	Michael Stoute	2:30.30
1985	Clanrallier	5	08-03	Brent Thomson	Bill Watts	2:33.05
1986	Rakaposhi King	4	09-07	Steve Cauthen	Henry Cecil	2:27.07
1987	Pipsted	3	08-10	Gary Carter	Geoff Wragg	2:26.14
1988	Roushayd	4	09-10	Billy Newnes	Fulke Johnson Houghton	2:30.44
1989	Nickle Plated	4	09-07	Gary Carter	Geoff Wragg	2:34.03
1990	Hateel	4	09-06	Frankie Dettori	Peter Walwyn	2:38.29
1991	Libk	3	08-11	Richard Hills	Harry Thomson Jones	2:29.30
1992	Matador	5	09-02	Pat Eddery	Roger Charlton	2:34.18
1993	Glide Path	4	08-02	Richard Hills	John Hills	2:32.73
1994	Glide Path	5	08-02	Michael Hills	Charles Hills	2:28.84
1995	Lombardic	4	08-04	John Reid	Julie Cecil	2:29.48
1996	Key To My Heart	6	10-00	Richard Hughes	Sally Hall	2:31.98
1997	Zaralaska	6	09-08	Pat Eddery	Luca Cumani	2:31.38
1998	Perfect Paradigm	4	09-02	Gary Hind	John Gosden	2:28.06
1999	Celestial Welcome	4	08-10	Carl Lowther	Mary Reveley	2:35.71
2000	Rada's Daughter	4	08-11	Kevin Darley	Ian Balding	2:31.24
2001	Hannibal Lad	5	08-08	Basil Marcus	Mark Brisbourne	2:35.35
2002	Sun Bird	4	07-12	John McAuley	Dick Allan	2:32.62
2003	Collier Hill	5	08-10	Pat Eddery	Alan Swinbank	2:30.46
2004	Alkaased	4	09-01	Jimmy Fortune	Luca Cumani	2:32.30
2005	Zeitgeist	4	08-10	Nicky Mackay	Luca Cumani	2:29.30
2006	Consular	4	08-08	Neil Callan	Michael Jarvis	2:28.83
2007	Dansili Dancer	5	09-03	Paul Mulrennan	Clive Cox	2:30.99
2008	Mad Rush	4	09-07	Seb Sanders	Luca Cumani	2:33.81
2009	Red Merlin	4	08-10	Philip Robinson	Clive Cox	2:29.75
2010	Dangerous Midge	4	08-10	Martin Dwyer	Brian Meehan	2:28.66
2011	Halicarnassus	7	08-13	Hugh Bowman	Mick Channon	2:32.08
2012	Number Theory	4	08-05	Russ Kennemore	John Holt	2:33.39
2013	Star Lahib	4	08-08	Franny Norton	Mark Johnston	2:30.49
2014	De Rigueur	6	09-04	Andrea Atzeni	Marco Botti	2:32.25
2015	Notarised	4	08-13	Silvestre de Sousa	Mark Johnston	2:31.70
2016	Tawdeea	4	09-03	Danny Tudhope	David O'Meara	2:35.25
2017	Dylan Mouth	6	09-10	Harry Bentley	Marco Botti	2:29.39
2018	Rainbow Rebel	5	08-11	Joe Fanning	Mark Johnston	2:27.36
2019	Kelly's Dino	6	08–12	Ben Curtis	Karl Burke	2:30.20
2020	Deja	5	09–10	Harry Bentley	Peter Chapple-Hyam	2:36.49
2021	Alounak	6	09-06	Silvestre de Sousa	Andrew Balding	2:35.32
2022	Get Shirty	6	09-08	Daniel Tudhope	David O'Meara	2:34.33
2023	Wootton'Sun	4	08-06	Joe Fanning	Richard Fahey	2:34.52
	no race 2024 (Note: The 2024 running was cancelled when racing at Haydock was abandoned for the day after 3 races due to safety concerns.)
2025	Plage De Havre	4	09-00	P. J. McDonald	Andrew Balding	2:31.33
2026 (Note: Run at Newmarket)	Sportingsilvermine	5	08-09	Marco Ghiani	James Owen	2:26:40

== See also ==
- Horse racing in Great Britain
- List of British flat horse races
