= Premio Elena e Sergio Cumani =

- Class: Listed
- Location: San Siro Racecourse; Milan, Italy
- Race type: Flat / Thoroughbred
- Website: San Siro

Race information
- Distance: 1,600 metres (1 mile)
- Surface: Turf
- Track: Right-handed
- Qualification: Three-years-old and up fillies and mares
- Weight: 55 kg (3yo); 57 kg (4yo+); Penalties; 3 kg for Group 1 winners * 2 kg for Group 2 winners * 1 kg for Group 3 winners * * since January 1
- Purse: €77,000 (2016); 1st: €23,800

The Premio Elena e Sergio Cumani is a Listed flat horse race in Italy open to thoroughbred fillies and mares aged three years or older. It is run at Milan over a distance of 1,600 metres (about 1 mile), and it is scheduled to take place each year in September or October.

The event is named in memory of Sergio Cumani, a ten-time champion trainer in Italy, and his wife Elena. It was formerly known as the Premio Bagutta, and for several years it was called the Premio Bagutta Memorial Sergio Cumani before being renamed the Premio Sergio Cumani. Elena Cumani's name was added to the title from the 2015 running.

The race was previously Group 3. After 2023, the race is contested at Listed level.

== Records ==
Most successful horse since 1979:

- no horse has won this race more than once since 1979

Leading jockey since 1988 (2 wins):

- Richard Quinn – Buckwig (1988), Welsh Diva (2002)
- Stefano Landi – Senebrova (1995), Desert Quiet (2006)
- Mirco Demuro – Marbye (2003), Khor Sheed (2011)
- Cristian Demuro – Nova Hawk (2012), Silver Step (2016)

Leading trainer since 1989 (2 wins):

- John Dunlop – Alabaq (1999), Snow Goose (2004)

== Winners since 1989 ==
Year	Winner	Age	Jockey	Trainer	Time
1989	Rosa de Caerleon	3	Sergio Dettori	Ubaldo Pandolfi	1:40.50
1990	Evening Kiss	3	Éric Legrix	Robert Collet	1:47.40
1991	Blue Daisy	3	Johnny Murtagh	John Oxx	1:41.50
1992	Siddharta	4	Santiago Soto	Gianfranco Verricelli	1:47.80
1993	Penny Drops	4	David Harrison	Lord Huntingdon	1:52.50
1994	Ardana	3	Armando Corniani	Armando Renzoni	1:46.60
1995	Senebrova	4	Stefano Landi	Valfredo Valiani	1:39.10
1996	Lara	4	Andrasch Starke	Bruno Schütz	1:43.30
1997	She Bat	3	Carlo Fiocchi	Vittorio Caruso	1:37.40
1998	Miss Carolina	4	Vincenzo Mezzatesta	Luigi Camici	1:44.90
1999	Alabaq	3	Michael Hills	John Dunlop	1:37.50
2000	Proudwings	4	Andreas Helfenbein	Ralf Suerland	1:45.40
2001	Toroca	3	Michael Kinane	Aidan O'Brien	1:47.60
2002	Welsh Diva	3	Richard Quinn	Amanda Perrett	1:42.80
2003	Marbye	3	Mirco Demuro	Bruno Grizzetti	1:38.80
2004	Snow Goose	3	Jimmy Fortune	John Dunlop	1:40.80
2005	Needlecraft	3	Frankie Dettori	Henri-Alex Pantall	1:42.00
2006	Desert Quiet	4	Stefano Landi	Pierluigi Giannotti	1:39.90
2007	Whazzis	3	Ryan Moore	William Haggas	1:39.60
2008	no race ^{[a]}
2009	Ravenel	3	Mario Esposito	Ralf Rohne	1:39.40
2010	Sajjhaa	3	Neil Callan	Michael Jarvis	1:38.20
2011	Khor Sheed	3	Mirco Demuro	Luca Cumani	1:35.30
2012	Nova Hawk	4	Cristian Demuro	Rod Collet	1:38.90
2013	Killachy Loose	4	Dario Vargiu	Bruno Grizzetti	1:35.80
2014	Ming Zhi Cosmos	3	Thierry Thulliez	Nicolas Clément	1:40.50
2015	Victoria Regina	4	Gregory Benoist	Henri-François Devin	1:37.70
2016	Silver Step	3	Cristian Demuro	Pia Brandt	1:34.60
2017	Candy Store	3	Dario Vargiu	Stefano Botti	1:36.10
2018	Binti Al Nar	3	Alexis Badel	Peter Schiergen	1:36.10
2019	Style Presa	4	Cristian Demuro	Rod Collet	1:34.00
2020	Party Goer	5	Antonio Fresu	Endo Botti	1:36.20
2021	Flamingo Girl^{[b]}	4	Fabio Branca	Henk Grewe	1:38.20
2022	Random Harvest	4	Saffie Osborne	Ed Walker	1:39.90

^{a} The 2008 running was cancelled because of a strike.
^{b} The 2021 races took place at Capannelle.

== Earlier winners ==
- 1979: Luisa Morales
- 1980: La Vreeland
- 1981: Holga
- 1982: Dewanadance
- 1983: Lina Cavalieri
- 1984: Royal Lorna
- 1985: English Spring
- 1986: Saint Samba
- 1987: Russian Lady
- 1988: Buckwig

== See also ==
- List of Italian flat horse races
