= Premio Mario Incisa della Rocchetta =

Flat horse race in Italy

- Location: San Siro Racecourse; Milan, Italy
- Race type: Flat / Thoroughbred
- Website: San Siro

Race information
- Distance: 2,000 metres (1¼ miles)
- Surface: Turf
- Track: Right-handed
- Qualification: Three-year-old fillies
- Weight: 56 kg Penalties; 3 kg for Group 1 winners * 2 kg for Group 2 winners * 1 kg for Group 3 winners * * since August 1 last year
- Purse: €34,200 (2016); 1st: €19,000

The Premio Mario Incisa della Rocchetta is a flat horse race in Italy open to three-year-old thoroughbred fillies. It is run at Milan over a distance of 2,000 metres (about 1¼ miles), and it is scheduled to take place each year in June.

== History ==
The event was originally called the Premio Legnano, and for a period it held Group 2 status. It was formerly open to fillies and mares aged three or older.

The Premio Legnano was subtitled the Memorial Mario Incisa della Rocchetta after the prominent racehorse owner's death in 1983. It was downgraded to Group 3 level in the late 1980s.

The race was cut from 2,000 to 1,600 metres in 1995. It was extended to 2,400 metres in 1997. It became known as the Premio Mario Incisa in the early 2000s, and during this period it was held in June.

The event was shortened to 2,000 metres and restricted to three-year-old fillies in 2005. From this point it was staged in late May, and usually titled the Premio Mario Incisa della Rocchetta. It was switched to late June in 2009. In 2015 it was moved to a date in early May and downgraded to Listed status. In 2025 it lose Listed status.

== Records ==
Most successful horse since 1978 (2 wins):

- Lara's Idea – 1991, 1992

Leading jockey since 1988 (3 wins):

- Gabriele Bietolini – Bemont Track (1996), Ellenica (1998), Kardthea (2002)

Leading trainer since 1988 (3 wins):

- Bruno Grizzetti – Kardthea (2002), Troppo Oca (2005), Rosa del Dubai (2008)
- Stefano Botti - Fasciascura (2012), Licia (2013), So Many Shots (2014)

== Winners since 1988 ==
Year	Winner	Age	Jockey	Trainer	Time
1988	Cunizza da Romano	4	John Reid	Luciano d'Auria	2:03.80
1989	Indian Queen	4	Paul Cook	William Hastings-Bass	2:03.50
1990	La Cascade	3	Gianfranco Dettori	Luciano d'Auria	2:05.30
1991	Lara's Idea	3	Gianfranco Dettori	Luigi Camici	2:05.20
1992	Lara's Idea	4	Vincenzo Mezzatesta	Luigi Camici	2:04.80
1993	Ruby Tiger	6	Richard Quinn	Paul Cole	2:05.10
1994	Alpride	3	Peo Perlanti	Mario Ciciarelli	2:07.50
1995	Olimpia Dukakis	3	Giovanni Forte	Giuseppe Botti	1:37.00
1996	Bemont Track	5	Gabriele Bietolini	Roberto Brogi	1:38.90
1997	Tulipa	4	Pat Eddery	Saeed bin Suroor	2:26.70
1998	Ellenica	3	Gabriele Bietolini	Maurizio Guarnieri	2:30.10
1999	Bimbola	5	Thierry Gillet	Jehan Bertran de Balanda	2:34.60
2000	Sailing	3	Fernando Jovine	Paul Cole	2:34.00
2001	Honorifique	4	Thierry Gillet	Rod Collet	2:31.60
2002	Kardthea	3	Gabriele Bietolini	Bruno Grizzetti	2:32.60
2003	Aynthia	3	Richard Hills	Henri-Alex Pantall	2:28.90
2004	Vale Mantovani	4	Mario Esposito	Vittorio Caruso	2:35.50
2005	Troppo Oca	3	Silvano Mulas	Bruno Grizzetti	2:03.30
2006	Dionisia	3	Mirco Demuro	Riccardo Menichetti	2:05.80
2007	Shot Bless	3	Mario Esposito	Maurizio Guarnieri	2:07.70
2008	Rosa del Dubai	3	Dario Vargiu	Bruno Grizzetti	2:09.70
2009	Lady Alida	3	Karoly Kerekes	Wolfgang Figge	2:06.70
2010	Tech Exceed	3	Eduardo Pedroza	Andreas Wöhler	2:01.50
2011	Navarra Queen	3	Mirco Demuro	Peter Schiergen	1:59.20
2012	Faciascura	3	Claudio Colombi	Stefano Botti	2:01.80
2013	Licia	3	Cristian Demuro	Stefano Botti	2:01.30
2014	So Many Shots	3	Cristian Demuro	Stefano Botti	2:03.50
2015	Joyful Hope	3	Claudio Colombi	Stefano Botti	2:02.10
2016	Responsibleforlove	3	Carlo Fiocchi	Endo Botti	2:03.70
2017	La Gommeuse	3	Dario Vargiu	Il Cavallo In Testa	2:08.80
2018	Sladina	3	Cristian Demuro	Alessandro Botti	2:03.80
2019	Elisa Again	3	Andrea Mezzatesta	Roberto Biondi	2:02.10
2021	Sopran Basilea	3	Fabio Branca	Grizzetti Galoppo SRL	2:02.20

== Earlier winners ==
- 1978: Azzurrina
- 1979: Quadrupler
- 1980: Nebbia sul Bradano
- 1981: Rattling Wind
- 1982: Corita
- 1983: Angela Serra
- 1984: Vers la Caisse
- 1985: Easy to Copy
- 1986: High Competence
- 1987: Russian Lady

== See also ==
- List of Italian flat horse races
