= Premio Carlo Chiesa =

- Location: Capannelle Racecourse; Rome, Italy
- Race type: Flat / Thoroughbred
- Website: Capannelle

Race information
- Distance: 1,200 metres (6f)
- Surface: Turf
- Track: Straight
- Qualification: Three-years-old and up fillies and mares
- Weight: 53 kg (3yo); 58½ kg (4yo+); Penalties; 3½ kg for Group 1 winners * 2 kg for Group 2 winners * 1 kg for Group 3 winners * * since August 1 last year
- Purse: €77,000 (2013); 1st: €29,750

The Premio Carlo Chiesa is a flat horse race in Italy open to thoroughbred fillies and mares aged three years or older. It is run over a distance of 1,200 metres (about 6 furlongs) at Capannelle in April.

== History ==
The event is named after Carlo Chiesa, the owner of the Allevamenti National breeding organisation in the 1970s.

The race was formerly classed at Listed level, and it used to be staged in May. For a period it was a 1,600-metre event restricted to fillies aged four or older.

The Premio Carlo Chiesa was given Group 3 status in 2004. It was cut to 1,200 metres and opened to three-year-olds in 2007. It was relegated to Listed status from the 2015 running. It loses Listed status in 2019. The event is currently held in mid-April.

== Records ==
Most successful horse since 1987 (2 wins):

- Bemont Park – 1995, 1996
- Miss Carolina – 1997, 1998

Leading jockey since 1987 (5 wins):

- Maurizio Pasquale – L'Ereditiera (1993), Miss Carolina (1997), Cromac (1999), Morena Park (2001), Torrigiana (2002)

Leading trainer since 1987 (3 wins):

- Luigi Camici – L'Ereditiera (1993), Miss Carolina (1997, 1998)
- Lorenzo Brogi – Cromac (1999), Torrigiana (2002), Kykuit (2006)

== Winners since 1987 ==
| Year | Winner | Age | Jockey | Trainer | Time |
|---|---|---|---|---|---|
| 1987 | Russian Lady | 4 | Gianfranco Dettori | Alduino Botti | 1:41.20 |
| 1988 | no race |
| 1989 | Lonely Bird | 4 | Jean-Luc Kessas | Emilio Borromeo | 1:40.80 |
| 1990 | Chuni | 4 | Giorgio Pucciatti | Armando Maggi | 1:41.70 |
| 1991 | Tinte Blu | 3 | Armando Corniani | Roberto Mimmocchi | 1:43.50 |
| 1992 | Without Delay | 3 | Armando Corniani | Giorgio Pucciatti | 1:38.00 |
| 1993 | L'Ereditiera | 4 | Maurizio Pasquale | Luigi Camici | 1:41.20 |
| 1994 | Carmen the Best | 3 | Jacqueline Freda | Vincenzo Zito | 1:38.40 |
| 1995 | Bemont Park | 4 | Gabriele Bietolini | Roberto Brogi | 1:38.60 |
| 1996 | Bemont Park | 5 | Gabriele Bietolini | Roberto Brogi | 1:38.30 |
| 1997 | Miss Carolina | 3 | Maurizio Pasquale | Luigi Camici | 1:39.90 |
| 1998 | Miss Carolina | 4 | Vincenzo Mezzatesta | Luigi Camici | 1:38.60 |
| 1999 | Cromac | 4 | Maurizio Pasquale | Lorenzo Brogi | 1:41.20 |
| 2000 | She's So Lovely | 4 | Sergio Dettori | Salvatore Saggiomo | 1:36.40 |
| 2001 | Morena Park | 3 | Maurizio Pasquale | Antonio Colella | 1:37.50 |
| 2002 | Torrigiana | 3 | Maurizio Pasquale | Lorenzo Brogi |
| 2003 | Frottola | 5 | Palmerio Agus | Valfredo Valiani | 1:37.20 |
| 2004 | Miss Nashwan | 4 | Marcello Belli | Maurizio Grassi | 1:41.80 |
| 2005 | Baila Salsa | 5 | Massimiliano Tellini | Frank Sheridan | 1:38.30 |
| 2006 | Kykuit | 4 | Mirco Demuro | Lorenzo Brogi | 1:40.80 |
| 2007 | Docksil | 3 | Pierantonio Convertino | Bruno Grizzetti | 1:08.80 |
| 2008 | Love Intrigue | 3 | Paolo Aragoni | Antonio Peraino | 1:09.20 |
| 2009 | L'Indiscreta | 4 | Dario Vargiu | Bruno Grizzetti | 1:10.40 |
| 2010 | Alta Fedelta | 4 | Fabio Branca | Vittorio Caruso | 1:09.50 |
| 2011 | Sandslash | 3 | Fabio Branca | Luigi Riccardi | 1:09.10 |
| 2012 | Noble Hachy | 3 | Cristian Demuro | Luigi Riccardi | 1:10.50 |
| 2013 | Bettolle | 4 | Michele Colombi | Jessica Lari | 1:08.24 |
| 2014 | Clorofilla | 4 | Luca Maniezzi | Marco Gasparini | 1:10.01 |
| 2015 | Evil Spell | 3 | Carlo Fiocchi | Edmondo Botti | 1:09.87 |
| 2016 |
| 2017 | Last Gift | 5 | Salvatore Basile | Attilio Giorgi | 1:08.53 |
| 2018 | Fataliste | 4 | Dario Vargiu | Endo Botti | 1:08.10 |
| 2019 | Charline Royale | 4 | Salvatore Basile | Silvia Amendola |

== See also ==
- List of Italian flat horse races
