= Premio del Piazzale =

- Class: Group 3
- Location: San Siro Racecourse; Milan, Italy
- Race type: Flat / Thoroughbred
- Website: San Siro

Race information
- Distance: 1,600 metres (1 mile)
- Surface: Turf
- Track: Right-handed
- Qualification: Three-years-old and up
- Weight: 55 kg (3yo); 56 kg (4yo+); Allowances; 1½ kg for fillies and mares Penalties; 3½ kg for Group 1 winners * 2 kg for Group 2 winners * 1 kg for Group 3 winners * * since January 1
- Purse: €64,900 (2016); 1st: €23,800

The Premio del Piazzale is a Group 3 flat horse race in Italy open to thoroughbreds aged three years or older. It is run at Milan over a distance of 1,600 metres (about 1 mile), and it is scheduled to take place each year in October.

The event was formerly classed at Listed level, and it used to be held in September. For a period it was contested over 1,800 metres.

The race was given Group 3 status and switched to October in 2011.

== Records ==
Most successful horse since 1997 (2 wins):

- Embody – 1998, 1999
- Anda Muchacho - 2017, 2019
- Lord Americo - 1988, 1989

Leading jockey (3 wins):

- Cristiano Demuro - Nabucco (2013), Voice Of Love (2016), Anda Muchacho (2017)
- Fabio Branca - Douce Vie (2012), Attimo Fuggente (2021), Aggenstein (2023)

Leading trainer (3 wins):

- Ralf Rhone - Estejo (2010), Nabucco (2013), Aggenstein (2023)
- Alduino Botti - Scabiun (2004), Attimo Fuggente (2021), Bahja Del Sol (2022)

== Winners since 2002 ==
Year	Winner	Age	Jockey	Trainer	Time
2002	Altieri	4	Gabriele Bietolini	Vittorio Caruso
2003	Lindholm	4	Arnaud Bouleau	Werner Glanz	1:42.70
2004	Scabiun	6	Edmondo Botti	Alduino Botti
2005	Lazio	4	Yann Lerner	Andreas Trybuhl	1:43.50
2006	Icelandic	4	Pierantonio Convertino	Frank Sheridan	1:42.60
2007	Miles Gloriosus	4	Luca Maniezzi	Maria Rita Salvioni	1:38.90
2008	Zenone	4	Sergio Urru	Laura Grizzetti	1:41.70
2009	Win for Sure	4	Umberto Rispoli	Andreas Wöhler	1:37.70
2010	Estejo	6	Mario Esposito	Ralf Rohne	1:36.60
2011	Le Vie Infinite	4	Dario Vargiu	Roberto Brogi	1:53.60
2012	Douce Vie	6	Fabio Branca	Stefano Botti	1:39.30
2013	Nabucco	3	Cristian Demuro	Ralf Rhone	1:42.50
2014	Spoil The Fun	5	Julien Auge	Christophe Ferland	1:40.80
2015	Felician	7	Andrasch Starke	Ferdinand Leve	1:58.70
2016	Voice of Love	3	Cristian Demuro	Stefano Botti	1:51.60
2017	Anda Muchacho	3	Dario Vargiu	Nicolo Simondi	1:50.10
2018	Dirk	4	Cristian Demuro	Alessandro Botti	1:49.30
2019	Anda Muchacho	5	Antonio Fresu	Nicolo Simondi	1:39.90
2020	Potemkin	9	Dennis Schiergen	Simon James Stokes	1:43.20
2021	Attimo Fuggente^{[a]}	4	Fabio Branca	Alduino Botti	1:36.70
2022	Bahja Del Sol	3	Sergio Urru	Alduino Botti	1:46.60
2023	Aggenstein	4	Fabio Branca	Ralf Rohne	1:42.20
2024	Brave Emperor	4	Luke Morris	Archie Watson	1:46.80
2025	Woodchuck	5	Antonio Orani	N. Bellanger	1:44.50

^{a} The 2021 races took place at Capannelle.

== Earlier winners ==
- 1956: Ribot
- 1975: Carnauba
- 1976: Strasburgo
- 1977: Eran
- 1985: Capo Nord
- 1987: Jurado
- 1988: Lord Americo
- 1989: Lord Americo
- 1990: Wild Grouse
- 1991: Sure Sharp
- 1992: Inner City
- 1994: Visto Si Stampi
- 1995: Thomire
- 1997: Kierkegaard
- 1998: Embody
- 1999: Embody
- 2000: Montestefano
- 2001: As You Like

== See also ==
- List of Italian flat horse races
