= Per Incanto =

American-bred thoroughbred racehorse and stud stallion

- Racing silks of Per Incanto
- Sire: Street Cry (IRE)
- Dam: Pappa Reale (GB)
- Sex: Stallion
- Foaled: 14 March 2004
- Country: United States
- Colour: Bay
- Breeder: Scuderia Archi Romani
- Owner: Scuderia Archi Romani
- Trainer: Roberto Brogi
- Record: 13:6-1-0
- Earnings: US$167,047

Major wins
- Premio Tudini (2007)
- Last updated on 27 February 2023

Per Incanto (foaled 2004) is a Thoroughbred racehorse who won the Group 3 Premio Tudini at age 3 and has gone on to forge a successful career as a stud stallion, siring a number of Group 1 winners.

He was bred by Scuderia Archi Romani.

== Racing career ==
Per Incanto's wins were:

- September 2006 - Premio Brook (1200m), Rome
- November 2006 - Premio Olimpio (1200m), Rome
- March 2007 - Premio Trofeo Breez-Up (1400m), Rome
- April 2007 - Premio dei Laghu (1200m), Milan
- May 2007 - Premio Tudini (1200m Group 3), Rome, ridden by Gabriele Bietolini.
- March 2009 - Allowance Optional Claiming (1200m) at Aqueduct Racetrack, USA.

== Stud career ==
Per Incanto stands at the Little Avondale Stud in the Wairarapa, New Zealand. He started his career with a low fee of NZ$4,000. However, in the 2014/15 season he became the:

- leading first-season sire in New Zealand by winners.
- runner-up sire for 2-year-olds.

In the 2020-21 Hong Kong racing season Per Incanto finished top of the stallion premiership for:

- winners (17), ahead of Exceed And Excel and Snitzel,
- wins (30), ahead of Snitzel and Deep Field.

Per Incanto's 2024 Service Fee was $NZ50,000 (+ GST). From 2025 he was joined at Little Avalon by his son, Little Brose, the 2022 Blue Diamond Stakes winner.

=== Notable progeny ===
c = colt, f = filly/mare, g = gelding

Foaled	Name	Sex	Dam	Damsire	Major wins
2012	Dal Cielo	g	Cent From Heaven	Centaine	2015 Diamond Stakes
2012	Shadows Cast	g	Ages Past	Slavic (1987)	2019 Thorndon Mile
2013	Santa Monica	f	Monarch	Volksraad (GB)	2019 Railway Stakes
2016	Roch 'n' Horse	f	Rochfort	Cecconi	2022 Newmarket Handicap; 2022 Champions Sprint (VRC)
2017	Belclare	f	Miss Rhythmic (NZ)	O'Reilly	2023 & 2024 New Zealand Thoroughbred Breeders Stakes
2017	Bonham	f	Fortune's Choice (Aus)	Redoute's Choice (Aus)	2021 Levin Classic
2019	Gringotts	g	Miss Bluebell	Savabeel	George Ryder Stakes
2019	Jimmysstar	g	Anniesstar (NZ)	Zed (NZ)	2025 Oakleigh Plate; 2025 All Aged Stakes; 2025 C F Orr Stakes; 2026 Manikato Stakes
2020	Little Brose	c	Mohegan Sky (USA)	Straight Man (USA)	2022 Blue Diamond Stakes

Per Incanto is the Dam Sire of Hong Kong Sprint winner Ka Ying Rising (Shamexpress - Missy Moo).

== See also ==
- Thoroughbred racing in New Zealand
