= Premio Ambrosiano =

Flat horse race in Italy

- Class: Group 3
- Location: San Siro Racecourse; Milan, Italy
- Race type: Flat / Thoroughbred
- Website: San Siro

Race information
- Distance: 2,000 metres (1¼ miles)
- Surface: Turf
- Track: Right-handed
- Qualification: Four-years-old and up
- Weight: 56 kg Allowances; 1½ kg for fillies and mares Penalties; 3½ kg for Group 1 winners * 2 kg for Group 2 winners * 1 kg for Group 3 winners * 1 kg if two Listed wins * * since August 1 last year
- Purse: €61,600 (2013); 1st: €23,800

The Premio Ambrosiano is a Group 3 flat horse race in Italy open to thoroughbreds aged four years or older. It is run over a distance of 2,000 metres (about 1¼ miles) at Milan in April.

== History ==
The event was formerly open to horses aged three or older. For a period it held Group 3 status. It was closed to three-year-olds in 1988, and downgraded to Listed level in 1996.

The race was promoted back to Group 3 in 2007.

== Records ==
Most successful horse since 1987 (2 wins):

- Altieri – 2004, 2005
- Orpello - 2013, 2014

Leading jockey since 1987 (5 wins):

- Fabio Branca – Jakkalberry (2010), Saratoga Black (2012), Orpello (2013, 2014), Circus Couture (2016)

Leading trainer since 1987 (4 wins):

- Stefano Botti - Orpello (2013, 2014), Circus Couture (2016), Voice Of Love (2017)

== Winners since 1987 ==
Year	Winner	Age	Jockey	Trainer	Time
1987	Verardi	4	Gianfranco Dettori	Alduino Botti	2:05.20
1988	Cunizza da Romano	4	Sergio Dettori	Luciano d'Auria	2:04.60
1989	Knight Line Dancer	4	Michel Jerome	Luigi Camici	2:08.20
1990	Tisserand	5	Luca Sorrentino	Mario Vincis	2:10.90
1991	Prorutori	5	Eddie Maple	Armando Renzoni	2:02.10
1992	Funny Baby	4	Alain Badel	Myriam Bollack-Badel	2:05.90
1993	Sugunas	5	Andreas Boschert	Andreas Wöhler	2:02.60
1994	Visto Si Stampi	4	Alan Munro	John Dunlop	2:04.80
1995	Penny Drops	6	David Harrison	Lord Huntingdon	2:07.90
1996	Tarhelm	4	Marco Latorre	Giuseppe Colleo	2:06.90
1997	Coral Reef	4	Marco Latorre	Giuseppe Colleo	2:09.90
1998	Mandilak	4	Fernando Jovine	Luca Cumani	2:06.60
1999	Apollo Wells	4	Massimiliano Tellini	Roberto Brogi	2:02.20
2000	Poseidon	6	Maurizio Pasquale	Lorenzo Brogi	2:11.50
2001	Fairy Charm	4	Mirco Demuro	Gianfranco Verricelli	2:08.40
2002	Shibuni's Falcon	5	Massimiliano Tellini	Maurizio Guarnieri	2:14.20
2003	Syrakus	5	Edmondo Botti	Hans Blume	2:07.80
2004	Altieri	6	Mario Esposito	Vittorio Caruso	2:05.90
2005	Altieri	7	Mario Esposito	Vittorio Caruso	2:12.60
2006	Bening	6	Edmondo Botti	Ovidio Pessi	2:02.00
2007	Pressing	4	Daniele Porcu	Roberto Feligioni	2:01.50
2008	Axxos	4	Terence Hellier	Peter Schiergen	2:02.70
2009	Selmis	5	Mirco Demuro	Vittorio Caruso	2:12.50
2010	Jakkalberry	4	Fabio Branca	Edmondo Botti	2:03.50
2011	Cima de Pluie	4	Dario Vargiu	Bruno Grizzetti	2:01.90
2012	Saratoga Black	5	Fabio Branca	Bruno Grizzetti	2:09.50
2013	Orpello	4	Fabio Branca	Stefano Botti	2:20.50
2014	Orpello	5	Fabio Branca	Stefano Botti	2:03.70
2015	Magic Artist	4	Cristian Demuro	Wolfgang Figge	2:02.90
2016	Circus Couture	4	Fabio Branca	Stefano Botti	2:00.00
2017	Voice Of Love	4	Dario Vargiu	Stefano Botti	2:01.00
2018	Together Again	4	Dario Vargiu	Alessandro Botti	2:00.30
2019	Dirk	5	Carlo Fiocchi	Alessandro Botti	1:59.70
2020	Brasilian Man	4	Gerald Mosse	Nicolo Simondi	2:02.08
2021	Grocer Jack	4	Marco Casamento	Waldemar Hickst	2:04.40
2022	Dawn Intello	5	Gerald Mosse	Andreas Schütz	2:03.30
2023	Sean	6	Luca Maniezzi	Karoly Kerekes	2:01.50
2024	Best of Lips	6	Hugo Boutin	Andreas Suborics	2:06.30
2025	Borna	4	Clement Lecoeuvre	Henk Grewe	2:01.50
2026	Woodchuck	6	Hugo Besnier	N Bellanger	2:02.80

== See also ==
- List of Italian flat horse races
