= Premio Federico Tesio =

- Class: Group 3
- Location: San Siro Racecourse; Milan, Italy
- Race type: Flat / Thoroughbred
- Website: San Siro

Race information
- Distance: 2,200 metres (1m 3f)
- Surface: Turf
- Track: Right-handed
- Qualification: Three-years-old and up
- Weight: 53 kg (3yo); 56 kg (4yo+); Allowances; 1½ kg for fillies and mares Penalties; 2 kg for Group 1 winners * 1 kg for Group 2 winners * * since January 1
- Purse: €132,000 (2016); 1st: €40,375

The Premio Federico Tesio is a Group 3 flat horse race in Italy open to thoroughbreds aged three years or older. It is run at Milan over a distance of 2,200 metres (about 1 mile and 3 furlongs), and it is scheduled to take place each year in September.

== History ==
The event is named after Federico Tesio (1869–1954), one of the most successful horse breeders in the sport's history.

The race was given Group 2 status in the 1970s. It was cut from 2,200 to 1,800 metres in 1985. It was relegated to Group 3 and restored to 2,200 metres in 1988.

The Premio Federico Tesio was promoted back to Group 2 level in 2011. It was cut from 2,200 to 2,000 metres in 2020. After 2023, the race is contested at Group 3 level.

== Records ==
Most successful horse since 1975 (3 wins):

- Voila Ici – 2008, 2009, 2010

Leading jockey since 1987 (6 wins):

- Mirco Demuro – Noel (1999), Voila Ici (2008, 2009, 2010), Sneak a Peek (2011), Orsino (2012)
- Dario Vargiu - Maktub (2003), Without Connexion (2004), Fair Nashwan (2006), Full Drago (2017), Thunderman (2021), Alburno (2024)

Leading trainer since 1987 (7 wins):

- Stefano Botti - Sneak a Peek (2011), Biz the Nurse (2013), Dylan Mouth (2014, 2015), Full Drago (2016, 2017), (Alburno) (2024)

== Winners since 1987 ==
Year	Winner	Age	Jockey	Trainer	Time
1987	Libertine	3	Eric Saint-Martin	Robert Collet	1:48.70
1988	Tony Bin	5	John Reid	Luigi Camici	2:16.80
1989	Knight Line Dancer	4	Fernando Jovine	Luigi Camici	2:24.70
1990	Heart of Groom	4	Santiago Soto	Ovidio Pessi	2:18.00
1991	Bateau Rouge	4	Michel Jerome	Ian Balding	2:17.10
1992	Erdelistan	5	Santiago Soto	Luciano d'Auria	2:18.60
1993	Misil	5	Frankie Dettori	Vittorio Caruso	2:19.50
1994	Royal Ballerina	4	Warren O'Connor	Michael Kauntze	2:17.30
1995	Sternkönig	5	Andrasch Starke	Theo Grieper	2:17.00
1996	Slicious	4	Mario Esposito	Vittorio Caruso	2:15.30
1997	Papering	4	Fernando Jovine	Luca Cumani	2:12.50
1998	War Declaration	4	Massimiliano Tellini	Bruno Grizzetti	2:21.10
1999	Noel	4	Mirco Demuro	Hans Blume	2:20.50
2000	Poseidon	6	Sergio Dettori	Lorenzo Brogi	2:24.40
2001	Well Made	4	Massimiliano Tellini	Hans Blume	2:20.90
2002	Tareno	4	Andreas Suborics	Peter Schiergen	2:16.40
2003	Maktub	4	Dario Vargiu	Bruno Grizzetti	2:17.40
2004	Without Connexion	5	Dario Vargiu	Pascal Bary	2:14.80
2005	no race
2006	Fair Nashwan	4	Dario Vargiu	Bruno Grizzetti	2:22.30
2007	Pressing	4	Edmondo Botti	Michael Jarvis	2:20.70
2008	Voila Ici	3	Mirco Demuro	Vittorio Caruso	2:15.40
2009	Voila Ici	4	Mirco Demuro	Vittorio Caruso	2:17.90
2010	Voila Ici	5	Mirco Demuro	Vittorio Caruso	2:18.10
2011	Sneak a Peek	3	Mirco Demuro	Stefano Botti	2:19.00
2012	Orsino	5	Mirco Demuro	Ralf Rohne	2:13.80
2013	Biz the Nurse	3	Cristian Demuro	Stefano Botti	2:14.50
2014	Dylan Mouth	3	Fabio Branca	Stefano Botti	2:15.30
2015	Dylan Mouth	4	Fabio Branca	Stefano Botti	2:14.70
2016	Full Drago	3	Cristian Demuro	Stefano Botti	2:12.80
2017	Full Drago	4	Dario Vargiu	Stefano Botti	2:18.20
2018	Night Music	5	Alexis Badel	Sarah Steinberg	2:15.50
2019	Chestnut Honey	3	Fabio Branca	Alduino Botti	2:12.60
2020	Stex (Note: The race distance changed to 2,000 Meters in 2020)	4	Michal Abik	Roland Dzubasz	2:00.00
2021	Thunderman (Note: The 2021 races took place at Capannelle)	5	Dario Vargiu	Alduino Botti	2:23.10
2022	Tempesti	3	Frankie Dettori	Riccardo Santini	2:21.70
2023	Tempesti	4	Cristian Demuro	Riccardo Santini	2:31.50
2024	Alburno	3	Dario Vargiu	Stefano Botti	2:22.70
2025	Atoso	6	Michaela Malacova	Frau Sarka Schutz	2:29.80

== Earlier winners ==
- 1975: Veio
- 1976: Gallio
- 1977: Stateff
- 1978: Stone
- 1979: Laostic
- 1980: Marmolada
- 1981: Nemr
- 1982: Haul Knight
- 1983: My Top
- 1984: Alan Ford
- 1985: King of Clubs
- 1986: Big Reef

== See also ==
- List of Italian flat horse races
