= John Smith's Silver Cup Stakes =

Flat horse race in Britain

John Smith's Silver Cup
2026
Mount Atlas	Tabletalk	Arabian Force

Previous years
2025
Al Qareem	Samui	Tabletalk
2024
Alsakib	Al Qareem	Wise Eagle
2023
Hamish	Scriptwriter	Tashkhan
2022
Without A Fight	John Leeper	Thunderous
2021
Hukum	Outbox	Fujaira Prince

2020-2011
2020
Eagles By Day	Communique	Universal Order
2019
Red Verdon	Gold Mount	Raheen House
2018
Dylan Mouth	Dal Harraild	Scotland
2017
Rare Rhythm	Barsanti	Clever Cookie
2016
Pamona	Barsanti	Quest For More
2015
Astronereus	Dashing Star	Great Hall
2014
Continuum	Waila	Great Hall
2013
Sun Central	Songcraft	Number Theory
2012
Mount Athos	High Jinx	Lyric Street
2011
Tactician	Fox Hunt	Western Pearl

2010-2001
2010
Free Agent	Drunken Sailor	Deauville Flyer
2009
Hits Only Vic	Warringah	Magicalmysterytour
2008
Yellowstone	Gull Wing	Eastern Anthem
2007
Wing Collar	Macorville	Shawhill
2006
Linas Selection	Balkan Knight	Lost Soldier Three
2005
Lost Soldier Three	Grampian	Sendintank
2004
Distinction	Star Member	Collier Hill
2003
Hugs Dancer	Mamcazma	Bourgeois
2002
Maycocks Bay	Damask Rose	Lady Two
2001
Akbar	Maniatis	Bay Of Islands

2000-1991
2000
Eminence Grise	Musician	Bay Of Islands
1999
Rainbow Ways	Banbury	Kahtan
1998
Sheer Danzig	Dream Of Nurmi	Street General
1997
Benatom	Willie Conquer	Cuff Link
1996
Celeric	Kristal's Paradise	Latahaab
1995
Saxon Maid	Magical Retreat	The Flying Phantom
1994
Castle Courageous	Muse	Magical Retreat
1993
Brandon Prince	Kaiser Wilhelm	Boloardo
1992
Tyrone Bridge	Hateel	Parting Moment
1991
Great Marquess	Bondstone	Shambo

1990-1988
1990
Wajna	Alphabel	Weld
1988
Waterfield	Princess Genista	Guarde Royale

The John Smith's Silver Cup Stakes is a Group 3 flat horse race in Great Britain open to horses aged four years or older.

It is run at York over a distance of 1 mile 5 furlongs and 188 yards (2,787 metres), and it is scheduled to take place each year in July. The race was first run in 1985 as the Sun Page 3 Stakes at Lingfield Park. The following year it had Listed status and was renamed the Sun Page 3 Silver Cup. It was moved to York in 1990 and was run as a handicap race between 1993 and 2015. In 2018 it was upgraded to Group 3 status and restricted to four-year-olds and up as part of the European Pattern Committee's commitment to improving the race programme for stayers in Europe.

== Records ==
Leading jockey (4 wins):

- Kieren Fallon – Benatom (1997), Distinction (2004), Lost Soldier Three (2005), Mount Athos (2012)

Leading trainer (6 wins):

- Sir Henry Cecil – Skaramanga (1985), Rakaposhi King (1986), Wajna (1990), Great Marquess (1991), Benatom (1997), Eminence Grise (2000)

== Winners ==
=== Silver Cup Stakes ===
Year	Winner	Age	Jockey	Trainer	Time
1985	Skaramanga	3	Steve Cauthen	Henry Cecil	3:02.92
1986	Rakaposhi King	4	Steve Cauthen	Henry Cecil	3:01.79
1987	Lemhill	5	Paul Cook	Michael Blanshard	2:57.38
1988	Waterfield	4	Pat Eddery	Peter Walwyn	3:01.72
1989	Ibn Bey	5	Richard Quinn	Paul Cole	2:59.10
1990	Wajna	3	A McGlone	Henry Cecil	2:56.23
1991	Great Marquess	4	Paul Eddery	Henry Cecil	3:25.75
1992	Tyrone Bridge	6	Michael Roberts	Martin Pipe	3:31.54

=== John Smith's Silver Cup Handicap ===
- Weights given in stones and pounds.

Year	Winner	Age	Weight	Jockey	Trainer	Time
1993	Brandon Prince	5	8-07	Frankie Dettori	Ian Balding	3:24.18
1994	Castle Courageous	7	9-05	John Reid	Lady Herries	2:55.31
1995	Saxon Maid	4	9-05	Jimmy Fortune	Luca Cumani	2:55.70
1996	Celeric	4	9-07	Willie Carson	David Morley	2:57.09
1997	Benatom	4	8-07	Kieren Fallon	Henry Cecil	2:56.37
1998	Sheer Danzig	6	9-07	Richard Hills	Robert Armstrong	2:53.46
1999	Rainbow Ways	4	8-12	Michael Hills	Barry Hills	2:54.17
2000	Eminence Grise	5	9-00	Richard Quinn	Henry Cecil	2:58.80
2001	Akbar	5	9-07	Kevin Darley	Mark Johnston	2:58.23
2002	Maycocks Bay	4	8-07	Seb Sanders	Michael Bell	2:56.12
2003	Hugs Dancer	7	9-00	Dean McKeown	James Given	2:53.51
2004	Distinction	5	9-07	Kieren Fallon	Michael Stoute	2:58.44
2005	Lost Soldier Three	4	9-08	Kieren Fallon	Luca Cumani	3:00.61
2006	Linas Selection	3	8-10	Kevin Darley	Mark Johnston	2:57.57
2007	Wing Collar	6	9-02	Paul Mulrennan	Tim Easterby	3:08.04
2008	Yellowstone	4	9-09	John Egan	Jane Chapple-Hyam	3:07.94
2009	Hits Only Vic	5	9-00	David Nolan	Declan Carroll	2:56.37
2010	Free agent	4	9-01	Ryan Moore	Richard Hannon Sr.	2:59.89
2011	Tactician	4	9-05	Eddie Ahern	Michael Bell	2:59.49
2012	Mount Athos	5	10-00	Kieren Fallon	Luca Cumani	3:02.15
2013	Sun Central	4	9-05	Seb Sanders	William Haggas	2:56.68
2014	Continuum	5	9-06	Joe Fanning	Peter Hedger	2:59.52
2015	Astronereus	4	9-11	Pat Dobbs	Amanda Perrett	3:00.18

=== John Smith's Silver Cup Stakes ===
Year	Winner	Age	Jockey	Trainer	Time
2016	Pamona	4	Jim Crowley	Ralph Beckett	2:57.91
2017	Rare Rhythm	5	James Doyle	Charlie Appleby	3:00.79
2018	Dylan Mouth	7	Dane O'Neill	Marco Botti	3:01.26
2019	Red Verdon	6	David Allan	Ed Dunlop	2:58.60
2020	Eagles by Day	4	Daniel Tudhope	David O’Meara	3:03.39
2021	Hukum	4	Jim Crowley	Owen Burrows	3:01.23
2022	Without A Fight	5	Andrea Atzeni	Simon & Ed Crisford	3:01.05
2023	Hamish	7	Tom Marquand	William Haggas	3:02.82
2024	Alsakib	4	P. J. McDonald	Andrew Balding	2:58.31
2025	Al Qareem	6	Clifford Lee	Karl Burke	3:01.27
2026	Mount Atlas	5	P. J. McDonald	Andrew Balding	3:03.60

== See also ==
- Horse racing in Great Britain
- List of British flat horse races
