= Drum Taps (horse) =

American-bred Thoroughbred racehorse

- Sire: Dixieland Band
- Grandsire: Northern Dancer
- Dam: Lavendula Rose
- Damsire: Le Levanstell
- Sex: Stallion
- Foaled: 1986
- Country: United States
- Colour: Bay
- Breeder: William Powell & Bates Newton
- Owner: William Stamps Farish III; Lord Carnarvon; Yoshio Asakawa
- Trainer: Dick Hern; Neil Howard; Lord Huntingdon
- Record: 31: 15-5-2
- Earnings: £620,470

Major wins
- W. L. McKnight Handicap (1990) (1990); Laurance Armour Handicap (1990); Geoffrey Freer Stakes (1991); Cumberland Lodge Stakes (1991); Coppa d'Oro di Milano (1992, 1993); Henry II Stakes (1992); Ascot Gold Cup (1992, 1993)

Awards
- European Champion Stayer (1992)
- Last updated on August 25, 2007

Drum Taps was an American-bred Thoroughbred racehorse. He was a noted stayer, showing his best form over distances in excess of two miles, but was also successful over shorter distances. He won England's most important staying race, the Ascot Gold Cup in 1992 and 1993. In 1992 he was named European Champion Stayer of 1992 at the Cartier Racing Awards. He raced in seven countries in a career which lasted from 1989 to 1993.

== Background ==
Drum Taps was bred in Kentucky, sired by the Northern Dancer stallion Dixieland Band out of the British-bred mare Lavendula Rose. Dixieland Band won the Pennsylvania Derby in 1983 and stood at the Lane's End Farm. Apart from Drum Taps, his most notable performer in Europe was the Prix de Diane winner and Prix de l'Arc de Triomphe runner-up Egyptband.

Drum Taps was acquired by William Stamps Farish III and sent into training with Dick Hern at West Ilsley, Berkshire in England. After racing as a three-year-old in Britain Drum Taps was trained in the United States for almost two years. He had his greatest success after being returned to England part way through his five-year-old season.

== Racing career ==
=== 1989: three-year-old season ===
Unraced at two, Drum Taps did not appear on the racecourse until August 1989, when he finished second in a minor race at Windsor. Twelve days later he crossed the line first in a maiden race at Sandown but was disqualified for causing interference. Drum Taps then recorded a quick hat-trick of wins. He won a maiden race at Ripon by five lengths followed by handicaps at Ascot and Newcastle. After his win at Newcastle, Farish sent Drum Taps to be trained in the United States by Neil Howard. On his American debut he won an allowance race at Calder Race Course in December.

=== 1990: four-year-old season ===
Drum Taps was trained in the United States throughout 1990. He ran seven times and recorded two Graded stakes wins, taking the W.L. McKnight Handicap at Calder in January and the Laurance Armour Handicap at Arlington Park in July. He also won an allowance race at Keeneland in October.

=== 1991: five-year-old season ===
Drum Taps ran four times in the United States in early 1991. He finished second in the Noble Dancer Handicap at Gulfstream Park and on his final American start, won an allowance race at Keeneland in April. He was then bought by Lord Carnarvon and sent back to England where he joined the stable of Lord Huntingdon.

He was an immediate success. In the Group Two Geoffrey Freer Stakes at Newbury in August, he took the lead a furlong out and won by two and a half lengths. In this race he was ridden for the first time by Frankie Dettori, who was to partner him in ten of his remaining fourteen races. A month later he took the Group Three Cumberland Lodge Stakes at Ascot, recovering to beat Rock Hopper and Young Buster after being headed in the final furlong.

In October he was moved up to Group One class for the first time and finished a half length second to Passing Sale in the Gran Premio del Jockey Club in Milan. On his final start of the season he ran unplaced behind Golden Pheasant in the Japan Cup.

At the end of the year Drum Taps was bought by Yoshio Asakawa.

=== 1992: six-year-old season ===
In 1992 Drum Taps, by then a six-year-old was campaigned for the first time over extended distances. On his debut in April he was sent to Milan for a second time and won the 3100m Coppa d'Oro di Milano (then a Group Three race) by three and a half lengths. A month later he took the Group Three Henry II Stakes at Sandown, beating Arcadian Heights by a length and a half.

His form was good enough to see Drum Taps start 7/4 favourite for the Gold Cup over two and a half miles at Royal Ascot. The field was not a strong one: apart from Drum Taps the only Group winners in the field were the French challengers Turgeon and Mardonius. Dettori tracked the leaders on Drum Taps before moving him into the lead in the straight. Drum Taps ran on strongly to win by two lengths with Arcadian Heights again taking second place. An unusual feature of the finish was that Arcadian Heights lunged at Drum Taps and attempted to bite him as he went past. The horse was forced to wear a muzzle in future races

Drum Taps had won his first three races on firm ground: he proved less effective on the soft ground which prevailed for the second half of the season. After a two-month break he was made favourite for the Prix Kergorlay at Deauville but was well beaten by the filly Sought Out. In the Irish St. Leger at The Curragh a month later he stayed on strongly in the straight but could finish only third to Mashaallah and Snurge. On his final start of the year in the Prix du Cadran at Longchamp he again finished second to Sought Out.

=== 1993: seven-year-old season ===
Drum Taps began his final season by recording a repeat win in the Coppa d'Oro di Milano. The ground was heavy, but Drum Taps did not need to be at his best to win by seven lengths from three moderate opponents.

The Gold Cup attracted a much stronger field in 1993 than it had done a year earlier. Turgeon and Arcadian Heights returned, and were joined by the top class stayers Vintage Crop, Sought Out, Further Flight and Assessor. Drum Taps started at 13/2 and produced his best performance. Dettori sent him into the lead four furlongs out, but he was challenged and headed by Assessor in the straight. Running on strongly under pressure, Drum Taps regained the lead a furlong out and pulled away to win by three lengths. After the race, Dettori claimed that he had never been concerned, even when losing the lead as Drum Taps was "the toughest battler I've ever ridden". Lord Huntingdon called him "an amazing horse" and outlined plans to run the horse in the Melbourne Cup.

Drum Taps was brought back in distance for his next start in the one and a half mile King George VI and Queen Elizabeth Stakes in July and performed creditably, finishing fifth of the ten runners behind Opera House.

Once again, Drum Taps failed to find his best form in Autumn. In September he finished fifth in the Irish St. Leger behind Vintage Crop and Assessor, horses he had decisively beaten in the Gold Cup. On his final start he was sent to Australia for the Melbourne Cup. His challenge attracted considerable attention at a time when foreign runners were a rarity in Australia but could finish only ninth in the race behind Vintage Crop.

== Assessment ==
At the 1992 Cartier Racing Awards, Drum Taps was named European Champion Stayer.

In his autobiography, Frankie Dettori described Drum Taps as "a hardened campaigner" and "one of my favourite horses."

In their book A Century of Champions, based on a modified version of the Timeform system, John Randall and Tony Morris rated Drum Taps as an "inferior" winner of the Gold Cup.

== Stud career ==
Drum Taps retired to stand as a stallion at the Yushun Stallion Station in Hokkaido, Japan. He does not appear to have been a success and did not sire any winners of importance. “He was 'put out of stud' in Japan in March 2004. He died on March 15, 2010, at Yushun Stallion Station, and is buried at Yushun Memorial Park.

== Pedigree ==
Pedigree of Drum Taps (USA), bay stallion, 1986
Sire Dixieland Band (GB) 1980	Northern Dancer; 1961	Nearctic	Nearco
Sire Dixieland Band (GB) 1980	Northern Dancer; 1961	Nearctic	Lady Angela
Sire Dixieland Band (GB) 1980	Northern Dancer; 1961	Natalma	Native Dancer
Sire Dixieland Band (GB) 1980	Northern Dancer; 1961	Natalma	Almahmoud
Sire Dixieland Band (GB) 1980	Mississippi Mud; 1973	Delta Judge	Traffic Judge
Sire Dixieland Band (GB) 1980	Mississippi Mud; 1973	Delta Judge	Beautillon
Sire Dixieland Band (GB) 1980	Mississippi Mud; 1973	Sand Buggy	Warfare
Sire Dixieland Band (GB) 1980	Mississippi Mud; 1973	Sand Buggy	Egyptian
Dam Lavendula Rose (GB) 1968	Le Levanstell; 1957	Le Lavandou	Djebel
Dam Lavendula Rose (GB) 1968	Le Levanstell; 1957	Le Lavandou	Lavande
Dam Lavendula Rose (GB) 1968	Le Levanstell; 1957	Stella's Sister	Ballyogan
Dam Lavendula Rose (GB) 1968	Le Levanstell; 1957	Stella's Sister	My Aid
Dam Lavendula Rose (GB) 1968	Inquisitive Rose; 1952	Grand Inquisitor	His Reverence
Dam Lavendula Rose (GB) 1968	Inquisitive Rose; 1952	Grand Inquisitor	High Prestige
Dam Lavendula Rose (GB) 1968	Inquisitive Rose; 1952	Rosemary's Queen	Snake Lightning
Dam Lavendula Rose (GB) 1968	Inquisitive Rose; 1952	Rosemary's Queen	Princess Rose (Family: 6-b)
