= Saffie Osborne =

British jockey (born 2002)

- Osborne in the winner's enclosure on the July Course, Newmarket, August 2026

Personal information
- Born: 11 March 2002 (age 24)
- Occupation: Jockey

Horse racing career
- Sport: Horse racing

Major racing wins
- Premio Elena e Sergio Cumani (2022); November Handicap (2022); Chester Cup (2023); Valiant Stakes (2023); Godolphin Stakes (2023); Dukhan Sprint (2024); Brontë Cup (2025); Victoria Cup (2025); St Leger (2026)

Significant horses
- Random Harvest; Metier; Tregony; Emaraaty Ana; Scenic; Highwayman

Saffron Rose Osborne (born 11 March 2002) is a multiple Group race winning British jockey who competes in flat racing. In September 2026, she became the first female jockey to win a British Classic race when Highwayman won the St Leger.

== Background ==
The daughter of equine artist Katie O'Sullivan and trainer and former National Hunt jockey Jamie Osborne, Osborne was born in Winchester and grew up around horses in Lambourn. She attended Cheam School and Bradfield College. She competed in eventing and won six medals at pony, junior and youth European championships, riding Little Indian Feather and Lakantus, both owned by Lord and Lady Blyth. A highlight of her eventing career was winning individual and team gold in the 2018 FEI European Pony Championships at Bishop Burton with Little Indian Feather, a former rescue pony from Ireland.

== Racing career ==
After leaving school in April 2019, Osborne worked at the yard of Aidan O'Brien for four months and then over the winter spent another four months gaining experience with Gai Waterhouse in Australia. She started out riding as an apprentice jockey in 2020, riding her first winner (Hot Scoop, trained by her father) at Windsor on 27 July 2020. In October 2020 Osborne was injured in a fall at Windsor, suffering concussion, broken ribs, a punctured lung and a broken arm. In 2021 Osborne came second behind Marco Ghiani in the apprentice championship in spite of having to take two weeks off in July after she sustained a leg injury in the starting stalls at Newmarket, and then having a second operation on her arm in October.

In 2022, Osborne was crowned Racing League leading jockey. She achieved her first Group race win in October 2022 while still an apprentice, riding Random Harvest, trained by Ed Walker, in the Group 3 Premio Elena e Sergio Cumani in Italy. In November 2022 she won the November Handicap at Doncaster on Metier, trained by Harry Fry, and later that month rode out her claim with her 95th winner. (Note: After riding 95 winners an apprentice jockey can no longer claim a weight allowance and must apply for a professional licence.) During her first season as a professional jockey in 2023, Osborne won the Chester Cup on Metier, while Random Harvest provided her with her first British Group race success in the Group 2 Valiant Stakes. Osborne was a member of the winning "Girls" team in the 2023 Shergar Cup, the first time she had participated in the event.

After three months off with a knee injury, Osborne returned to riding in February 2024 and became the first female jockey to win a race at Meydan Racecourse, when she rode Ouzo, trained by her father, to victory in the Lord Glitters Handicap on 16 February. The following day she won the Dukhan Sprint in Doha on Emaraaty Ana, also trained by her father. On 4 May 2024, Osborne had her first ride in a Classic race when she rode 40/1 outsider Ten Bob Tony, trained by Ed Walker, into 8th place in the 2000 Guineas at Newmarket.

Osborne captained the Great Britain team, which included Ryan Moore and Dylan Browne McMonagle, to victory in the 2026 Shergar Cup.

On 12 September 2026, Osborne became the first female jockey to win a Brutish Classic raced when Highwayman landed the St Leger at Doncaster on Highwayman. She had only been given the ride on the 11/1 chance by trainer Joseph Patrick O'Brien, for whom she had never previously ridden, a few days before the race. Osborne hit the front a quarter of a mile out and never looked in danger, crossing the finishing line two-and-a-half lengths in front of more fancied stablemate Enceladus, ridden by Billy Loughnane. After the race, Osborne said: "I'm in shock. I burst into tears. When I saw it was the 250th year I thought there has to be a good story this year and surely a girl winning it would be quite a good story after 250 years!" Stephanie Peacock, the minister for sport congratulated Osborne, saying: "“Her victory is a landmark moment for women in horse racing and follows Rachael Blackmore's historic Grand National win in 2021, showing once again that women are breaking new ground and making history in racing".

== Personal life ==
In June 2021, after Osborne was the subject of threats on social media, her father contacted police; this led to a wider debate about online abuse of racing participants.

== Major wins ==
(United Kingdom) Great Britain

- St Leger Stakes - (1) - Highwayman (2026)
