= Premio Verziere =

Flat horse race in Italy

- Class: Group 3
- Location: San Siro Racecourse; Milan, Italy
- Race type: Flat / Thoroughbred
- Website: San Siro

Race information
- Distance: 2,000 metres (1¼ miles)
- Surface: Turf
- Track: Right-handed
- Qualification: Three-years-old and up fillies and mares
- Weight: 55 kg (3yo); 57 kg (4yo+); Penalties; 3 kg for Group 1 winners * 2 kg for Group 2 winners * 1 kg for Group 3 winners * * since January 1
- Purse: €77,000 (2016); 1st: €23,800

The Premio Verziere is a Group 3 flat horse race in Italy open to thoroughbred fillies and mares aged three years or older. It is run at Milan, Italy over a distance of 2,000 metres (about 1¼ miles), and it is scheduled to take place each year in October.

== History ==
The event was formerly classed at Listed level, and it used to be held in May or June. It was promoted to Group 3 status and renamed the Premio Paolo Mezzanotte in 2004. For a period it was open to fillies aged four or older.

The race reverted to its previous title, the Premio Verziere, in 2009. From this point it was staged in October, and open to fillies aged three and up.

The title "Premio Paolo Mezzanotte" is currently assigned to a different race, a Listed event formerly known as the Premio FIA-BEF.

== Records ==
Most successful horse:

- Quaduna – 2013, 2014

Leading jockey since 2002 (3 wins):

- Edmondo Botti – Nashatara (2003), Exhibit One (2006), Wickwing (2007)

Leading trainer since 2002 (2 wins):

- Valfredo Valiani – Vigata (2005), Exhibit One (2006)
- Andreas Wohler- Quaduna (2013, 2014)

== Winners since 2002 ==
Year	Winner	Age	Jockey	Trainer	Time
2002	Golden Honor	5	Michel Planard	Fausto Trappolini
2003	Nashatara	4	Edmondo Botti	Robert Collet	2:01.50
2004	Deva	5	Karoly Kerekes	Dieter Ronge	2:05.70
2005	Vigata	4	Claudio Colombi	Valfredo Valiani	2:04.70
2006	Exhibit One	4	Edmondo Botti	Valfredo Valiani	2:02.90
2007	Wickwing	4	Edmondo Botti	Alduino & Giuseppe Botti	2:06.70
2008	Mimetico	4	Dario Vargiu	Bruno Grizzetti	2:06.30
2009	Cottonmouth	5	Nicola Pinna	Stefano Botti	2:08.00
2010	Irini	4	Luca Maniezzi	Hans-Jürgen Gröschel	2:05.60
2011	Temida	3	Mario Esposito	Miltcho Mintchev	2:02.20
2012	Cartaya	4	Umberto Rispoli	Miroslav Rulec	2:03.80
2013	Quaduna	3	Fabio Branca	Andreas Wöhler	2:09.20
2014	Quaduna	4	Eduardo Pedroza	Andreas Wöhler	2:10.50
2015	Loritania	3	Dario Vargiu	Il Cavallo In Testa	2:05.30
2016	Wordless	4	Fabio Branca	Stefano Botti	1:59.60
2017	Disdain	5	Cristian Demuro	Sarah Steinberg	2:04.20
2018	Flower Party	3	Dario Vargiu	Alessandro Botti	2:03.10
2019	Call Me Love	3	Fabio Branca	Alessandro Botti	2:03.40
2020	Elisa Again	4	Andrea Mezzatesta	Roberto Biondi	2:06.10
2021	Sopran Basilea (Note: The 2021 running took place at Capannelle)	3	Carlo Fiocchi	Grizzetti Galoppo SRL	2:01.70
2022	Atomic Blonde	3	Silvano Mulas	Henk Grewe	2:07.00
2023	Moonu	4	Salvatore Sulas	M Janikowski	2:01.00
2024	Sioux Life	3	Dario Di Tocco	Endo Botti	2:05.00
2025	Taany	5	Dario Vargiu	Luciano Vitable	2:01.10

== Earlier winners ==
- 1977: Cima Cresta
- 1981: Holga
- 1983: Lina Cavalieri
- 1987: Kris the Lady
- 1988: Sharp Gain
- 1990: Free Thinker
- 1991: So Romantic
- 1994: Ginevra di Camelot
- 1995: Foolish Heart
- 1996: Rosi Zambotti
- 1997: Karla Wyller
- 1998: Field of Hope
- 1999: Sopran Taireen
- 2000: She's So Lovely
- 2001: In the Night

== See also ==
- List of Italian flat horse races
