= Premio del Giubileo =

- Class: Group 3
- Location: San Siro Racecourse; Milan, Italy
- Race type: Flat / Thoroughbred
- Website: San Siro

Race information
- Distance: 1,800 m (1.1 mi; 8.9 furlongs)
- Surface: Turf
- Track: Right-handed
- Qualification: Three-years-old and up
- Weight: 54 kg (3yo); 59 kg (4yo+); Allowances; 1 1/2 kg for fillies and mares Penalties; 3 1/2 kg for Group 1 winners 2 kg for Group 2 winners 1 kg for Group 3 winners
- Purse: €61,600 (2015)

The Premio del Giubileo is a Group 3 flat horse race in Italy open to thoroughbreds aged three years or older. It is run over a distance of 1,800 m (1.1 mi; 8.9 furlongs) at Milan in late June or early July.

== History ==
The event was formerly run as a limited handicap. It used to be contested over 1,600 metres. It became a Listed conditions race in 2007.

The Premio del Giubileo was extended to 1,800 metres in 2010. It was promoted to Group 3 level in 2013.

== Records ==
Most successful horse since 1987 (2 wins):
- Sotabrasciet – 2000, 2001

Leading jockey since 1987 (5 wins):

- Dario Vargiu - Sotabrasciet (2001), Cima de Triomphe (2010), Greg Pass (2016), Voice of Love (2017), Wait Forever (2018)

Leading trainer since 1987 (4 wins):

- Alduino Botti– Singing Cousine (1991), Martino Alonso (1998), Lupesco (2002), Ceprin (2005)
- Giuseppe Botti - El Paesa (1994), Martino Alonso (1998), Lupesco (2002), Ceprin (2005)
- Bruno Grizzetti - Mauve Reef (1990), Nordhal (2004), Sopran Promo (2008), Cima de Triomphe (2010)

== Winners since 1987 ==
Year	Winner	Age	Jockey	Trainer	Time
1987	Johnny Nobody	7	Allan Mackay	Mario Mugnai	1:39.30
1988	Totley Brook	4	Vittorio Panici	Valfredo Valiani	1:38.60
1989	Bin Shaddad	5	Jacques Heloury	Frank Turner	1:38.80
1990	Mauve Reef	4	Maurizio Vargiu	Bruno Grizzetti	1:38.30
1991	Singing Cousine	4	Edmondo Botti	Alduino Botti	1:39.60
1992	Punch n' Run	4	Alessandro Parravani	Ovidio Pessi	1:45.30
1993	Golden Bechett	3	Jacqueline Freda	Giuliano Fratini	1:41.30
1994	El Paesa	4	Edmondo Botti	Giuseppe Botti	1:38.20
1995	Ravier	4	Fernando Jovine	Emilio Borromeo	1:38.80
1996	Morigi	5	Massimiliano Tellini	Ildo Tellini	1:40.40
1997	Kierkegaard	4	Fernando Jovine	David Ducci	1:41.90
1998	Martino Alonso	4	Fernando Jovine	A. Botti / G. Botti	1:38.40
1999	Raffaello	4	Maurizio Pasquale	Lorenzo Brogi	1:37.40
2000	Sotabrasciet	9	Mirco Demuro	Luciano d'Auria	1:30.70
2001	Sotabrasciet	10	Dario Vargiu	Luciano d'Auria	1:39.20
2002	Lupesco	4	Ivan Rossi	A. Botti / G. Botti
2003	Giovane Imperatore	5	Maurizio Pasquale	Lorenzo Brogi	1:39.50
2004	Nordhal	5	Mirco Demuro	Bruno Grizzetti	1:38.70
2005	Ceprin	4	Edmondo Botti	A. Botti / G. Botti	1:38.60
2006	Justin Vegas	4	Fabio Branca	Francesca Folco
2007	Miles Gloriosus	4	Frankie Dettori	Riccardo Menichetti	1:40.30
2008	Sopran Promo	4	Pierantonio Convertino	Bruno Grizzetti	1:40.50
2009	Blue Coral	5	Massimiliano Tellini	Tomas Satra	1:35.70
2010	Cima de Triomphe	5	Dario Vargiu	Bruno Grizzetti	1:49.60
2011	Iryklon	5	Mirco Demuro	Vaclav Luka Jr.	1:49.10
2012	Branderburgo	5	Mario Esposito	Maurizio Grassi	1:49.40
2013	Pattaya	5	Mario Esposito	Stefano Botti	1:48.50
2014	Steaming Kitten	3	Fabio Branca	Gianluca Bietolini	1:50.90
2015	Circus Couture	3	Fabio Branca	Stefano Botti	1:51.30
2016	Greg Pass	4	Dario Vargiu	Il Cavallo In Testa	1:53.00
2017	Voice of Love	4	Dario Vargiu	Stefano Botti	1:52.00
2018	Wait Forever	3	Dario Vargiu	Alessandro Botti	1:50.50
2019	Lapulced'acqua	4	Silvano Mulas	Grizzetti Galoppo	1:49.30
2020	Stex	4	Michal Abik	Roland Dzubasz	2:02.60
2021	American Bridge	4	Cristian Demuro	Jean-Claude Rouget	1:58.40
2022	Norge	4	Bauyrzhan Murzabayev	Ralf Rohne	2:03.30
2023	Kolossal	5	Mickael Forest	Carmen Bocskai	2:03.00
2024	Une Perle	4	Valentine Seguy	J Reynier	2:01.70
2025	Taany	5	Alberto Sanna	Luciano Vitabile	2:01.30
2026	Bella Sinfonia	4	Eduardo Pedroza	Andreas Wöhler	2:01.20

== See also ==
- List of Italian flat horse races
