= Premio Primi Passi =

- Class: Listed
- Location: San Siro Racecourse; Milan, Italy
- Race type: Flat / Thoroughbred
- Website: San Siro

Race information
- Distance: 1,200 metres (6f)
- Surface: Turf
- Track: Straight
- Qualification: Two-year-olds
- Weight: 56 kg Allowances; 1½ kg for fillies
- Purse: €77,000 (2015); 1st: €23,800

The Premio Primi Passi is a Listed flat horse race in Italy open to two-year-old thoroughbreds. It is run at Milan over a distance of 1,200 metres (about 6 furlongs), and it is scheduled to take place each year in June or July.

It was Italy's first Group race of the year for two-year-olds. It was previously Group 3, but it was downgraded to Listed from 2025.

== Records ==
Leading jockey since 1988 (4 wins):

- Mirco Demuro – Solitary Dancer (1998, dead-heat), Rolly Polly (2000), Blu Constellation (2010), Fontanelice (2014)

Leading trainer since 1988 (4 wins):

- Bruno Grizzetti – Della Scala (1997), Rolly Polly (2000), Orpen Shadow (2009), Ottone (2015)

== Winners since 1988 ==
Year	Winner	Jockey	Trainer	Time
1988	Flaming Sword	Vincenzo Mezzatesta	Bill O'Gorman	1:13.10
1989	Manoftheyear	Fernando Jovine	Bruno Agriformi	1:11.10
1990	Arranvanna	Gary W. Moore	Armando Renzoni	1:10.20
1991	Stuck	Jacques Heloury	Lorenzo Brogi	1:10.70
1992	Little Munchkin	Gianfranco Dettori	John Dunlop	1:14.30
1993	Fred Bongusto	Bartolo Jovine	Roberto Brogi	1:10.70
1994	Bruttina	Maurizio Pasquale	Luigi Camici	1:10.60
1995	Tarte aux Pommes	Thierry Gillet	Jehan Bertran de Balanda	1:11.10
1996	Kingsinger	Richard Hughes	Mick Channon	1:11.00
1997	Della Scala	Giovanni Forte	Bruno Grizzetti	1:14.30
1998 (dh)	Kabuki; Solitary Dancer	Edmondo Botti; Mirco Demuro	Hans Blume; Ovidio Pessi	1:11.90
1999	Palanca	Michael Roberts	Heinz Jentzsch	1:11.20
2000	Rolly Polly	Mirco Demuro	Bruno Grizzetti	1:08.40
2001	Stolzing	Andreas Suborics	Urs Suter	1:10.80
2002	Le Vie dei Colori	Giacomo Temperini	Roberto Brogi	1:09.70
2003	Clifden	John Egan	Mark Wallace	1:09.80
2004	Shifting Place ^{[a]}	Luca Maniezzi	Riccardo Menichetti	1:10.70
2005	Guest Connections	Olivier Peslier	Mick Channon	1:10.20
2006	Golden Titus	Stefano Landi	Armando Renzoni	1:10.80
2007	Magritte	Carlo Fiocchi	Riccardo Menichetti	1:12.50
2008	Lui Rei	Umberto Rispoli	Armando Renzoni	1:10.10
2009	Orpen Shadow	Dario Vargiu	Bruno Grizzetti	1:10.20
2010	Blu Constellation	Mirco Demuro	Vittorio Caruso	1:14.00
2011	Vedelago	Mario Esposito	Luigi Polito	1:10.70
2012	Chilworth Icon	Sam Hitchcott	Mick Channon	1:11.60
2013	Arpinati	Mario Eposito	Stefano Botti	1:10.90
2014	Fontanelice	Mirco Demuro	Stefano Botti	1:11.00
2015	Ottone	Fabio Branca	Bruno Grizetti & Luigi Riccardi	1:11.00
2016	Hargeisa	Carlo Fioccha	Mario Hofer	1:10.50
2017	Ipompieridiviggiu	Dario Vargiu	Il Cavallo In Testa	1:11.70
2018	You Better Run	Silvano Mulas	Luciano Vitabile	1:09.60
2019	Malotru	Andrea Atzeni	Marco Botti	1:09.70
2020	Aria Importante	Carlo Fiocchi	Grizzetti Galoppo	1:10.00
2021	Windstormblack	Gabriele Cannarella	Sebastiano Guerrieri	1:09.00
2022	Bottle Of Bubbles	Dario Di Tocco	Florian Guyader	1:09.30

^{a} Obe Gold finished first in 2004, but he was relegated to second place following a stewards' inquiry.

== Earlier winners ==
- 1975: Northern Spring
- 1976: West In
- 1977: El Muleta
- 1978: Ladislao di Oppelm
- 1979: My Pardo
- 1980: Erodoto
- 1981: Grease
- 1982: Faith Guest
- 1983: Executive Man
- 1984: Balqis
- 1985: Assisi del Santo
- 1986: Stay Low
- 1987: Rey Carlos

== See also ==
- List of Italian flat horse races
