= Capannelle Racecourse =

Horse racing venue in Rome

Coordinates: 41°49′25″N 12°34′09″E

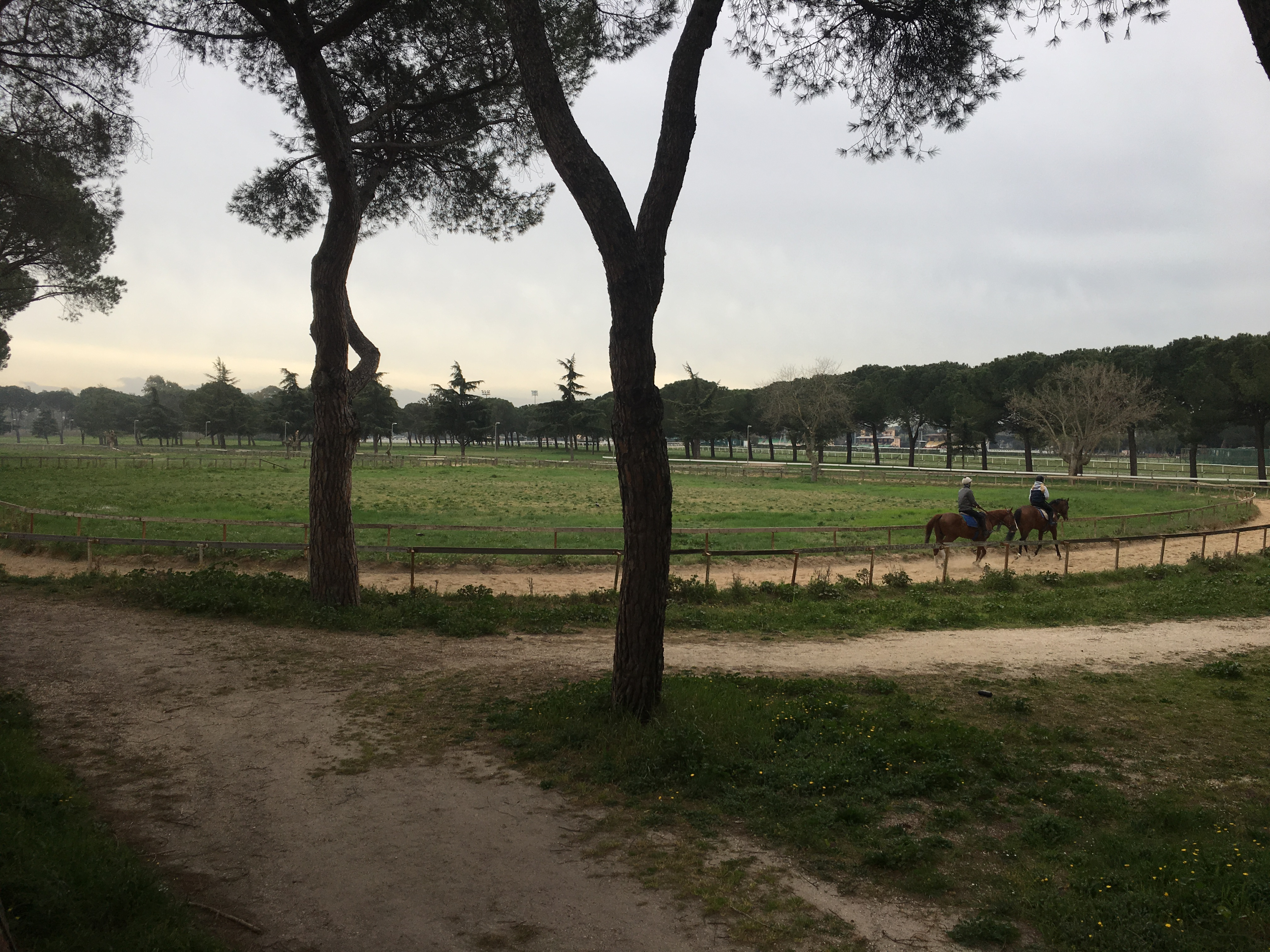
Capannelle Racecourse, March 2019

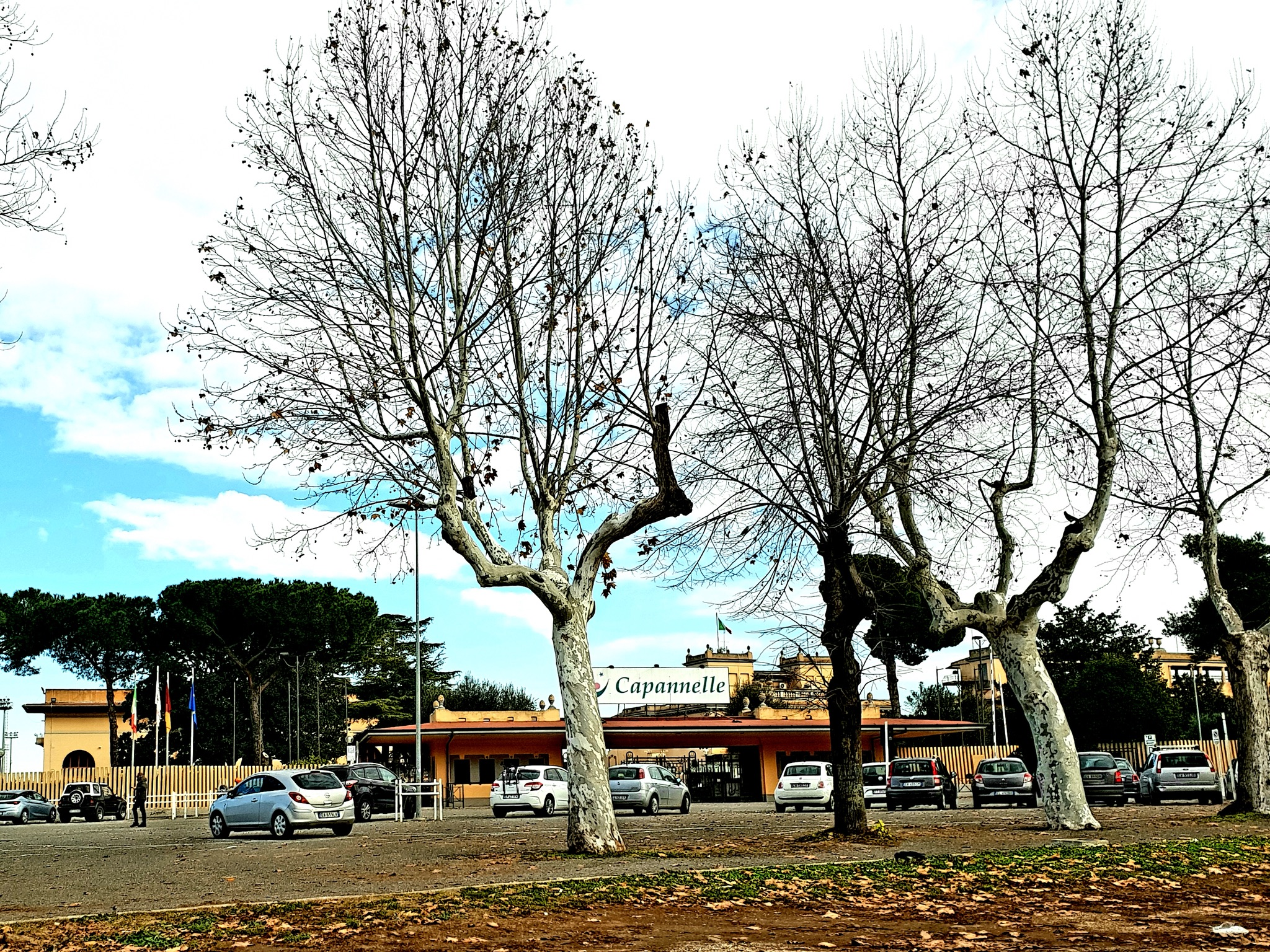
External view of Capannelle Racecourse, December 2018

Capannelle Racecourse (Italian: Ippodromo delle Capannelle) is a horse racing venue in Rome, Italy. The course was constructed in 1881, and it was rebuilt in 1926 to a design by Paolo Vietti-Violi.

It was recently the venue of two Group 1 flat races – the Premio Lydia Tesio (downgraded to Group 2 in 2019) and the Premio Roma (downgraded to Group 2 in 2017). The track also stages the most valuable flat race in Italy, the Derby Italiano, which was downgraded to Group 2 status in 2009.

Group 2 races include the Premio Ribot and the Premio Presidente della Repubblica. Group 3 races include the Premio Tudini, Premio Carlo Chiesa, Premio Carlo e Francesco Aloisi, Premio Carlo d'Alessio, and Premio Guido Berardelli.

It is also home ground of Italy's premier cricket club, Capannelle Roma.

On September 8, 2019, the world's largest pizza party was held at the racecourse, where 1,146 people dined on pizza together.
