= All At Sea (horse) =

American-bred Thoroughbred racehorse

- Sire: Riverman
- Grandsire: Never Bend
- Dam: Lost Virtue
- Damsire: Cloudy Dawn
- Sex: Mare
- Foaled: 3 May 1989
- Country: United States
- Colour: Chestnut
- Breeder: Juddmonte Farms
- Owner: Khalid Abdullah
- Trainer: Henry Cecil
- Record: 9: 5-3-0
- Earnings: £288,445

Major wins
- Pretty Polly Stakes (1992); Musidora Stakes (1992); Prix du Moulin (1992)

All At Sea (3 May 1989 – 2007) was an American-bred, British-trained Thoroughbred racehorse and broodmare. In a racing career which lasted from October 1991 until September 1992 she recorded five wins and three second places from nine starts. After easily winning her only race as a juvenile she won her first three starts in the following spring including the Pretty Polly Stakes and the Musidora Stakes. She went on to run second in the Epsom Oaks, Nassau Stakes and International Stakes before recording her biggest success in the Prix du Moulin. She was retired from racing after finishing fourth in the Queen Elizabeth II Stakes. As a broodmare she produced several minor winners but no top-class performers. She is the female-line ancestor of Ombudsman.

== Background ==
All At Sea was a chestnut mare with a white blaze bred in Kentucky by her owner, Khalid Abdullah's Juddmonte Farms. She was sent to Europe and entered training with Henry Cecil at the Warren Place stable at Newmarket, Suffolk. She was ridden in all but of her races by Pat Eddery.

She was sired by Riverman an American-bred, French-trained who won the Poule d'Essai des Poulains and the Prix Jean Prat in 1972. Riverman went on to become a highly successful stallion, whose offspring included Triptych, Irish River, Gold River and Bahri. All At Sea's dam Lost Virtue was unraced but was a successful broodmare whose other foals included Over the Ocean (Prix Perth) and Quandary (the grand-dam of Twice Over and Timepiece). Her dam, Aunt Tilt, was a half-sister to Damascus.

== Racing career ==
=== 1991: two-year-old season ===
On her racecourse debut, All At Sea started the 4/11 favourite for a maiden race over one mile at Wolverhampton Racecourse on 1 October. After being restrained by Eddery in the early stages she took the lead two furlongs from the finish and won "easily" by three lengths.

=== 1992: three-year-old season ===
Willie Ryan took the ride when All At Sea made her first appearance as a three-year-old in a minor event over ten furlongs at Nottingham Racecourse on 13 April. Starting the 13/8 favourite against four opponents she took the lead in the straight and drew away in the closing stages to win by five lengths from Niodini a Michael Stoute-trained filly who later won the Lancashire Oaks and Park Hill Stakes. Seventeen days later the filly was stepped up in class and started favourite for the Listed Pretty Polly Stakes over the same distance at Newmarket. She recorded another five length victory, taking the lead in the last quarter mile and winning impressively. On 12 May All At Sea started 8/11 favourite for the Musidora Stakes (a major trial for the Epsom Oaks) over ten and a half furlongs at York Racecourse. She won by a length from the 1000 Guineas fourth Perfect Circle after going to the front approaching the final furlong.

On 6 June at Epsom Racecourse All At Sea started the 11/10 favourite for the 214th running of the Oaks Stakes over one and a half miles on good to soft ground. She reached second place in the straight but was unable to get on terms with the leader User Friendly and was beaten three and a half lengths into second place with the first two finishing twenty lengths in front of the other five runners. At Goodwood Racecourse on 1 August All At Sea was matched against older fillies and mares in the Nassau Stakes in which she started favourite but was beaten a neck by the five-year-old Ruby Tiger (E. P. Taylor Stakes). Seventeen days later the filly faced male opposition for the first time in the International Stakes at York and started at odds of 5/1 in a twelve-runner field which included Kooyonga, Rodrigo de Triano, Dr Devious, Terimon, Seattle Rhyme and Zoman. She took the lead in the last quarter mile but was overtaken and beaten a length into second place by Rodrigo de Triano.

The Prix du Moulin at Longchamp Racecourse on 6 September saw All At Sea sent to France for the first and only time. Her owner had to pay a supplementary fee of £9,000 to run the filly as she had not been among the original entries for the race. Racing on soft ground over 1600 metres she started second favourite behind Brief Truce with the other eight runners being Hatoof, El Prado, Kitwood (Prix Jean Prat), Cardoun (Critérium de Maisons-Laffitte), Shanghai (Poule d'Essai des Poulains), Misil (Premio Parioli), Take Risks (Prix Messidor) and Sharp Review (Brief Truce's stablemate and pacemaker). After racing just behind the leaders All At Sea gained the advantage 300 metres from the finish and held off the challenge of Brief Truce to win a by a neck. On her final racecourse appearance All At Sea contested the Queen Elizabeth II Stakes over one mile at Ascot Racecourse on 26 September. She started at odds of 4/1 and finished fourth behind Lahib, Brief Truce and Selkirk with Second Set, Mystiko, Marling and Hamas finishing behind.

== Breeding record ==
At the end of her racing career All At Sea was retired to become a broodmare for Juddmonte Farms. She produced at least 10 foals and 7 winners between 1994 and 2007:

- Imroz, a bay filly, foaled in 1994, sired by Nureyev. Won three races, dam of winners.
- Insinuate, chestnut filly, 1996, by Mr. Prospector. Won one race, placed third in a Listed race, dam of winners. Female-line ancestor of Ombudsman.
- All The Luck, chestnut filly, 1997, by Mr. Prospector. Beaten in only race. Dam of winners.
- Painted Room, chestnut colt, 1998, by Woodman. Failed to win in eight races.
- Stormy Channel, chestnut filly, 1999, by Storm Cat. Won one race, dam of winners.
- Home Fleet, chestnut colt, 2000, by Gone West. Won one race.
- Akimbo, bay colt (later gelded), 2001, by Kingmambo. Won one race.
- Awash, chestnut colt, 2002, by Coronado's Quest. Won one race.
- Oceanography, dark bay or brown colt (gelded), 2004, by Aptitude. Won four races.
- Ocean Talent, bay filly, 2007, by Aptitude. Unraced.

== Pedigree ==
Pedigree of All At Sea (USA), chestnut mare, 1989
Sire Riverman (USA) 1969	Never Bend; 1960	Nasrullah (GB)	Nearco (ITY)
Sire Riverman (USA) 1969	Never Bend; 1960	Nasrullah (GB)	Mumtaz Begum (FR)
Sire Riverman (USA) 1969	Never Bend; 1960	Lalun	Djeddah (FR)
Sire Riverman (USA) 1969	Never Bend; 1960	Lalun	Be Faithful
Sire Riverman (USA) 1969	River Lady; 1963	Prince John	Princequillo (IRE)
Sire Riverman (USA) 1969	River Lady; 1963	Prince John	Not Afraid
Sire Riverman (USA) 1969	River Lady; 1963	Nile Lily	Roman
Sire Riverman (USA) 1969	River Lady; 1963	Nile Lily	Azalea
Dam Lost Virtue (USA) 1977	Cloudy Dawn; 1969	Grey Dawn (FR)	Herbager
Dam Lost Virtue (USA) 1977	Cloudy Dawn; 1969	Grey Dawn (FR)	Polamia (USA)
Dam Lost Virtue (USA) 1977	Cloudy Dawn; 1969	Creme Brulee	Double Jay
Dam Lost Virtue (USA) 1977	Cloudy Dawn; 1969	Creme Brulee	Desert Sun (GB)
Dam Lost Virtue (USA) 1977	Aunt Tilt; 1963	Tulyar (IRE)	Tehran (GB)
Dam Lost Virtue (USA) 1977	Aunt Tilt; 1963	Tulyar (IRE)	Neocracy (GB)
Dam Lost Virtue (USA) 1977	Aunt Tilt; 1963	Kerala	My Babu (FR)
Dam Lost Virtue (USA) 1977	Aunt Tilt; 1963	Kerala	Blade of Time (Family 8-h)
