= Lahib =

American-bred Thoroughbred racehorse

- Sire: Riverman
- Grandsire: Never Bend
- Dam: Lady Cutlass
- Damsire: Cutlass
- Sex: Stallion
- Foaled: 23 April 1988
- Country: United States
- Colour: Brown
- Breeder: Hamdan Al Maktoum
- Owner: Hamdan Al Maktoum
- Trainer: John Dunlop
- Record: 8: 3-4-0
- Earnings: £407,632

Major wins
- Queen Anne Stakes (1992); Queen Elizabeth II Stakes (1992)

Awards
- Timeform rating 103 (1991), 129 (1992)

Lahib (23 April 1988 – 15 June 2013) was an American-bred, British-trained Thoroughbred racehorse and sire. He was unraced as a juvenile and won once from two starts as a three-year-old in the spring of 1991. In the following year he improved to become one of the best milers in Europe, winning the Queen Anne Stakes and the Queen Elizabeth II Stakes as well as finishing second in the Lockinge Stakes, Prix Jacques Le Marois and Champion Stakes. He was retired from racing at the end of the year and became a breeding stallion. He had some success as a sire of winners.

== Background ==
Lahib was a brown horse with a white sock on his left hind leg bred in Kentucky by his owner Hamdan Al Maktoum. He was sired by Riverman a French horse who won the Poule d'Essai des Poulains in 1972. As a breeding stallion he was highly successful, being the sire of many important winners including Irish River, Detroit, Bahri, Gold River, River Memories and Triptych. Lahib's dam, Lady Cutlass won three races from seven starts in the United States between 1980 and 1982 and was a half-sister to General Store, whose descendants have included Al Bahathri, Military Attack, Red Cadeaux and Haafhd.

Hamdan Al Maktoum opted to race Lahib in Europe and sent him into training with John Dunlop at Arundel in West Sussex. He was ridden in all but one of his races by the Scottish jockey Willie Carson.

== Racing career ==
=== 1991: three-year-old season ===
Lahib did not race as a two-year-old, making his debut in a maiden race over one mile at Newbury Racecourse on 20 April 1991. Starting at odds of 7/1 he took the lead a furlong out but was caught in the final strides and beaten a head by Ristna, a filly who went on to win the Sun Chariot Stakes. Twelve days later at Newmarket Racecourse Lahib started 11/10 favourite for a similar event over the same distance and recorded his first victory, beating Close Fried by a neck. The colt had training problems thereafter, and missed the rest of the season. He underwent surgery on his forelegs and a further operation on an undescended testicle.

=== 1992: four-year-old season ===
After an absence of more than eleven months, Lahib returned to the track in April 2012 and finished sixth of the eight runners behind Sure Sharp in the Group Three Earl of Sefton Stakes at Newmarket. A month later the colt was moved up to Group Two level and started a 16/1 outsider in the Lockinge Stakes at Newbury. Ridden by Richard Quinn (Carson was riding Hamdan Al Maktoum's more fancied Mukaddamah) Lahib stayed on well in the closing stages and finished second, two and a half lengths behind the winner Selkirk. On 16 June at Royal Ascot, Lahib was reunited with Carson and started 100/30 favourite for the Queen Anne Stakes. His seven opponents were Second Set, Exit To Nowhere (Prix du Muguet), Rudimentary (Sandown Mile), Goofalik (Prix du Chemin de Fer du Nord), Star of Gdansk (third in The Derby), Approach the Bench (Beresford Stakes), Sikeston and Lovealoch. Lovealoch set the pace before Sikeston went to the front three furlongs out. Second Set went to the front inside the final furlong but Lahib, who had been amongst the leaders from the start, stayed on strongly in the closing stages, took the lead in the final strides, and won by a head.

In August Lahib was sent to France to contest the Group One Prix Jacques Le Marois at Deauville Racecourse and finished second of the fourteen runners, a length behind the winner Exit To Nowhere. The unplaced runners included Star of Cozzene, Hatoof, El Prado and Sikeston. On 26 September Lahib was one of nine horses to contest the Group One Queen Elizabeth II Stakes at Ascot and started the 8/1 fifth choice in the betting behind Selkirk, All At Sea (Prix du Moulin), Marling and Brief Truce. The other runners were Second Set, Mystiko, Hamas and Sharp Review. After tracking the leaders, Lahib overtook the pacemaker Hamas two furlongs from the finish and was "driven out" by Carson to win by two lengths from Brief Truce with Selkirk taking third ahead of All At Sea.

On his final racecourse appearance, Lahib was moved up in distance for the Champion Stakes over ten furlongs at Newmarket on 17 October. Starting at odds of 2/1 in a ten-runner field, he took the lead a quarter of a mile from the finish but was overtaken inside the final furlong and beaten a neck by Rodrigo de Triano.

== Stud record ==
Lahib was retired from racing to become a breeding stallion at his owner's Derrinstown Stud. He was briefly based at the Scarvagh House Stud before moving to the Old Road Stud in Tallow, County Waterford in 2009. His best offspring have included Vicious Circle (Ebor Handicap), Super Tassa, Last Resort (Challenge Stakes), Late Night Out (Supreme Stakes), Mus-If (National Stakes), Dutch Gold (Chester Vase), La-Faah (Horris Hill Stakes), River Belle (Mrs. Revere Stakes). He was pensioned from stud duties in 2011 and relocated to Derrinstown Stud and Died on 15 June 2013.

== Pedigree ==
Pedigree of Lahib (USA), brown stallion, 1988
Sire Riverman (USA) 1969	Never Bend (USA); 1960	Nasrullah	Nearco
Sire Riverman (USA) 1969	Never Bend (USA); 1960	Nasrullah	Mumtaz Begum
Sire Riverman (USA) 1969	Never Bend (USA); 1960	Lalun	Djeddah
Sire Riverman (USA) 1969	Never Bend (USA); 1960	Lalun	Be Faithful
Sire Riverman (USA) 1969	River Lady (USA); 1963	Prince John	Princequillo
Sire Riverman (USA) 1969	River Lady (USA); 1963	Prince John	Not Afraid
Sire Riverman (USA) 1969	River Lady (USA); 1963	Nile Lily	Roman
Sire Riverman (USA) 1969	River Lady (USA); 1963	Nile Lily	Azalea
Dam Lady Cutlass (USA) 1978	Cutlass (USA); 1970	Damascus	Sword Dancer
Dam Lady Cutlass (USA) 1978	Cutlass (USA); 1970	Damascus	Kerala
Dam Lady Cutlass (USA) 1978	Cutlass (USA); 1970	Aphonia	Dunce
Dam Lady Cutlass (USA) 1978	Cutlass (USA); 1970	Aphonia	Gambetta
Dam Lady Cutlass (USA) 1978	General's Sister (USA); 1960	Count Fleet	Reigh Count
Dam Lady Cutlass (USA) 1978	General's Sister (USA); 1960	Count Fleet	Quickly
Dam Lady Cutlass (USA) 1978	General's Sister (USA); 1960	Cigar Maid	Pavot
Dam Lady Cutlass (USA) 1978	General's Sister (USA); 1960	Cigar Maid	Never Again (Family 9-e)
