= Sudirman (horse) =

American-bred Thoroughbred racehorse

- Sire: Henrythenavigator
- Grandsire: Kingmambo
- Dam: Shermeen
- Damsire: Desert Style
- Sex: Stallion
- Foaled: 23 April 2011
- Country: United States
- Colour: Bay
- Breeder: Kathryn Nikkel & Jeanne Canty
- Owner: Mrs Fitri Hay & Susan Magnier
- Trainer: David Wachman
- Record: 9: 3-1-1
- Earnings: £190,882

Major wins
- Railway Stakes (2013); Phoenix Stakes (2013)

Sudirman (foaled 23 April 2011) is an American-bred, Irish-trained Thoroughbred racehorse. As a two-year-old in 2013 he was beaten in his first two starts but then ran up three consecutive victories including the Railway Stakes and the Phoenix Stakes. He also finished second in the National Stakes later that year. He made little impact in two starts as a three-year-old.

== Background ==
Sudirman is a bay horse with no white markings bred in Kentucky by Kathryn Nikkel & Jeanne Canty. In 2012 he was sent to England and put up for the auction at the Tattersalls October Yearling Sale where he was bought for 200,000 guineas by the bloodstock agent John Warren on behalf of the Coolmore Stud. During his racing career he was trained by David Wachman at Goolds Cross, County Tipperary. Like many horses associated with Coolmore the details of his ownership changed from race to race: he sometimes raced in the colours of Mrs Fitri Hay while on other occasions he was described as being owned by a partnership of Hay and Susan Magnier. He was ridden in all but one of his races by Wayne Lordan.

He was sired by Henrythenavigator who won the 2000 Guineas, Irish 2000 Guineas, St James's Palace Stakes and Sussex Stakes in 2008. As a breeding stallion he was not a conspicuous success and was eventually exported to Russia, but he did sire several other good winners including George Vancouver (Breeders' Cup Juvenile Turf) and Pedro the Great. Sudirman's damShermeen was a useful racemare who won three minor races in Europe before being relocated to the United States where she won the Luther Burbank Handicap. She was descended from Fair Astronomer who finished second in the 1000 Guineas and was the female-line ancestor of Malhub, Deputy Commander, Donna Blini and Gentildonna.

== Racing career ==
=== 2013: two-year-old season ===
Sudirman made his debut in a minor race over six furlongs at Naas Racecourse on 15 May in which he started at odds of 10/1 and finished last of the five runners behind Big Time. Eleven days later, in a maiden race at the Curragh he produced a much better effort as he came home in third place, beaten a length by the Aidan O'Brien-trained winner Sir John Hawkins. On 20 June at Leopardstown the colt started odds-on favourite for a maiden and recorded his first success as he took the lead a furlong out and pulled away to win "comfortably" by four and a half lengths from nine opponents. Nine days after his win at Leopardstown the colt was stepped up in class and started 5/1 third favourite in a five-runner field for the Group 2 Railway Stakes at the Curragh. The Aidan O'Brien-trained Coach House headed the betting on 8/15 after winning the Marble Hill Stakes and finishing second in the Norfolk Stakes, with Big Time the 9/2 second choice. Sudirman raced in third before moving up to challenge Big Time for the lead approaching the final furlong. He gained the advantage in the closing stages and won by half a length, with a gap of over four lengths back to Coach House in third.

On 11 August at Leopardstown Sudirman was moved up to Group 1 class for the Phoenix Stakes and started second favourite behind the Coventry Stakes winner War Command. The other three runners were Big Time, Ambiance [sic] (winner of the Dragon Stakes) and the outsider Sniper. Ambiance set the pace with Lordan settling his mount in third before making a forward move in the last quarter mile. Sudirman took the lead a furlong out and stayed on well under strong pressure to win by half a length from Big Time. After the race Wachman said: "He's a good tough horse, he won't do too much when he gets there, he idles in front. He did it well, he's tough and keeps finding. There was a good bit left in the tank. I'm delighted for Wayne, we have been waiting on one of these for a while and have been knocking on the door. We'll probably step up to seven furlongs, he's been crying out for that trip."

Sudirman attempted to record a second Group 1 success when he was stepped up in distance for the National Stakes over seven furlongs at the Curragh on 15 September. He proved the best of the four Irish runners but was no match for the British-trained favourite Toormore and was beaten two and three quarter lengths into second place. In October he was sent to England and started second favourite for the Middle Park Stakes over six furlongs at Newmarket Racecourse. He tracked the leaders but failed to quicken in the closing stages and finished fifth of the ten runners behind Astaire.

=== 2014: three-year-old season ===
Sudirman did not race in the early part of 2014 and only made his reappearance on 2 June in the Listed Lacken Stakes over six furlongs at Naas. Euipped with blinkers for the first time he raced in second place for most of the way before fading into fourth place behind the favourite Due Diligence. Billy Lee took the ride when the colt was sent to Royal Ascot and started a 20/1 outsider for the Jersey Stakes on 18 June. Carrying a five pound weight penalty for his Group 1 success he chased the leaders before dropping away quickly and being eased down by Lee in the closing stages to finish 20th of the 23 runners.

== Pedigree ==
Pedigree of Sudirman (USA), bay stallion, 2011
Sire Henrythenavigator (USA) 2005	Kingmambo (USA); 1990	Mr Prospector	Raise A Native
Sire Henrythenavigator (USA) 2005	Kingmambo (USA); 1990	Mr Prospector	Gold Digger
Sire Henrythenavigator (USA) 2005	Kingmambo (USA); 1990	Miesque	Nureyev
Sire Henrythenavigator (USA) 2005	Kingmambo (USA); 1990	Miesque	Pasadoble
Sire Henrythenavigator (USA) 2005	Sequoyah (IRE); 1998	Sadler's Wells	Northern Dancer
Sire Henrythenavigator (USA) 2005	Sequoyah (IRE); 1998	Sadler's Wells	Fairy Bridge
Sire Henrythenavigator (USA) 2005	Sequoyah (IRE); 1998	Brigid	Irish River
Sire Henrythenavigator (USA) 2005	Sequoyah (IRE); 1998	Brigid	Luv Luvin'
Dam Shermeen (IRE) 2003	Desert Style (IRE); 1992	Green Desert	Danzig
Dam Shermeen (IRE) 2003	Desert Style (IRE); 1992	Green Desert	Foreign Courier
Dam Shermeen (IRE) 2003	Desert Style (IRE); 1992	Organa	High Top
Dam Shermeen (IRE) 2003	Desert Style (IRE); 1992	Organa	Canton Silk
Dam Shermeen (IRE) 2003	Cover Girl (IRE); 1996	Common Grounds	Kris
Dam Shermeen (IRE) 2003	Cover Girl (IRE); 1996	Common Grounds	Sweetly
Dam Shermeen (IRE) 2003	Cover Girl (IRE); 1996	Peace Carrier	Doulab
Dam Shermeen (IRE) 2003	Cover Girl (IRE); 1996	Peace Carrier	Paradise Bird (Family: 16-f)
