= Brief Truce =

American-bred Thoroughbred racehorse

- Sire: Irish River
- Grandsire: Riverman
- Dam: Falafel
- Damsire: Northern Dancer
- Sex: Stallion
- Foaled: 8 May 1989
- Country: United States
- Colour: Bay
- Breeder: Moyglare Stud
- Owner: Moyglare Stud
- Trainer: Dermot Weld
- Record: 9: 4-3-2
- Earnings: £348,870

Major wins
- Amethyst Stakes (1992); Gallinule Stakes (1992); St James's Palace Stakes (1992)

Brief Truce (8 May 1989 – 14 August 2018) was an American-bred, Irish-trained Thoroughbred racehorse and sire. After winning his only race as a juvenile in 1991 he improved in the spring of the following year to finish third in the Irish 2,000 Guineas and win both the Amethyst Stakes and the Gallinule Stakes. In June he recorded his biggest win when he defeated a very strong field in the St James's Palace Stakes at Royal Ascot. Later that year he was placed in the Prix du Moulin, Queen Elizabeth II Stakes and Breeders' Cup Mile. After his retirement from racing he had some success as a breeding stallion in Australia.

== Background ==
Brief Truce was a bay horse with a white star bred in Kentucky by his owners, the Moyglare Stud. He was one of the best horses sired by Irish River, the leading colt of his generation in France, whose wins included the Poule d'Essai des Poulains, Prix d'Ispahan, Prix Jacques Le Marois and Prix du Moulin. As a breeding stallion he sired several other major winners including Hatoof and Paradise Creek. Brief Truce's dam Falafel, won one minor race and was a daughter of Queen's Statute, an outstanding broodmare whose other descendants have included Awaasif, Lammtarra, Hector Protector, Bosra Sham and Pour Moi.

The colt was sent to Europe where he was trained by Dermot Weld. He was ridden in all of his races by Mick Kinane.

== Racing career ==
=== 1991: two-year-old season ===
On his only appearance as a two-year-old, Brief Truce was one of eighteen juveniles to contest a maiden race over six furlongs at Fairyhouse on 9 November. He started the 7/4 favourite and won by two and a half lengths from the John Oxx-trained Polar Wind.

=== 1992: three-year-old season ===
Brief Truce began his second season in the Leopardstown 2,000 Guineas Trial Stakes on 18 April in which he finished second, beaten a neck by the Vincent O'Brien-trained Portico. Three weeks later he started favourite for the Listed Amethyst Stakes over the same course and distance and won by four lengths from the filly Tijara. On 16 May at the Curragh Brief Truce started at odds of 11/1 in a six-runners field for the Irish 2,000 Guineas. He finished third behind the English 2000 Guineas winner Rodrigo de Triano and Ezzoud, beaten two and a half lengths by the winner. The colt was then stepped up in distance for the Gallinule Stakes over ten furlongs at the Curragh on 6 June and won by length from the Tommy Stack-trained Firing Line.

Ten days after his win at the Curragh, Brief Truce was sent to England for the 147th running of the St James's Palace Stakes at Royal Ascot and started a 25/1 outsider in an eight-runner field. Rodrigo de Triano and Ezzoud where among the leading contenders as well as the Diomed Stakes winner Zaahi, but the favourite for the race was Arazi, the outstanding two-year-old of 1991. The other runners were the Gimcrack Stakes winner River Falls, Casteddu (winner of a valuable sprint at Redcar) and the 100/1 outsider Beldi. Kinane positioned the colt, who was equipped with blinkers for the first time, in fourth place behind Zaahi in the early stages before switching left to make his challenge in the straight. He caught the leader in the final strides and won by a short head with Ezzoud in third. Rodrigo de Triano, who had made a threatening run down the centre of the track, finished fourth ahead of Arazi.

On 6 September, Brief Truce was matched against older horses for the first time when he was sent to France for the Prix du Moulin at Longchamp Racecourse. Starting the 2.1/1 favourite he finished strongly but failed by a neck to overhaul the filly All At Sea with Hatoof two and a half lengths back in third. Three weeks later at Ascot, the colt started the 7/1 fourth choice in the betting for the Queen Elizabeth II Stakes behind Selkirk, All At Sea and Marling. After being restrained in the early stages he made steady progress in the straight and finished second in rough race, two lengths behind the four-year-old Lahib. On his final appearance Brief Truce was sent to Florida to contest the Breeders' Cup Mile at Gulfstream Park on 31 October despite previous reports that he would be aimed at the Breeders' Cup Classic. He finished third of the fourteen runners, beaten three lengths and a neck by Lure and Paradise Creek.

== Stud record ==
Brief Truce was retired from racing to become a breeding stallion. He stood in Ireland and Switzerland and was shuttled to Australia for the southern hemisphere breeding season. He had his greatest success in Australia where his best winners included Diatribe (Rosehill Guineas, Caulfield Cup), Red Oog (TJ Smith Stakes), True Jewels (Blue Diamond Stakes), General Truce (D.C. McKay Stakes) and True Glo (BRC Sprint). In 2012, at the age of 23, he was reported to be still covering mares at Independent Stallions in Victoria, which was also the home of his former rival Arazi. By September 2017 Brief Truce had been retired from stud duty and was enjoying retirement at Stockwell Stud. He died at Stockwell Stud in August 2018 at the age of 29; stud owner Mike Becker said "He was a great horse to work with and he taught a lot of young fellas who are now working at studs around the world what it is like to handle a stallion because if you didn't learn quick, he was going to teach you quick...He has gone well, and he has had a great life."

== Pedigree ==
Pedigree of Brief Truce (USA), bay stallion, 1989
Sire Irish River (FR) 1976	Riverman (USA); 1969	Never Bend	Nasrullah
Sire Irish River (FR) 1976	Riverman (USA); 1969	Never Bend	Lalun
Sire Irish River (FR) 1976	Riverman (USA); 1969	River Lady	Prince John
Sire Irish River (FR) 1976	Riverman (USA); 1969	River Lady	Nile Lily
Sire Irish River (FR) 1976	Irish Star (FR); 1960	Klairon	Clarion
Sire Irish River (FR) 1976	Irish Star (FR); 1960	Klairon	Kalmia
Sire Irish River (FR) 1976	Irish Star (FR); 1960	Botany Bay	East Side
Sire Irish River (FR) 1976	Irish Star (FR); 1960	Botany Bay	Black Brook
Dam Falafel (CAN) 1973	Northern Dancer (CAN); 1961	Nearctic	Nearco
Dam Falafel (CAN) 1973	Northern Dancer (CAN); 1961	Nearctic	Lady Angela
Dam Falafel (CAN) 1973	Northern Dancer (CAN); 1961	Natalma	Native Dancer
Dam Falafel (CAN) 1973	Northern Dancer (CAN); 1961	Natalma	Almahmoud
Dam Falafel (CAN) 1973	Queen's Statute (GB); 1954	Le Lavandou	Djebel
Dam Falafel (CAN) 1973	Queen's Statute (GB); 1954	Le Lavandou	Lavande
Dam Falafel (CAN) 1973	Queen's Statute (GB); 1954	Statute	Son-in-Law
Dam Falafel (CAN) 1973	Queen's Statute (GB); 1954	Statute	Nina (Family 22-b)
