= Henrythenavigator =

American-bred Thoroughbred racehorse

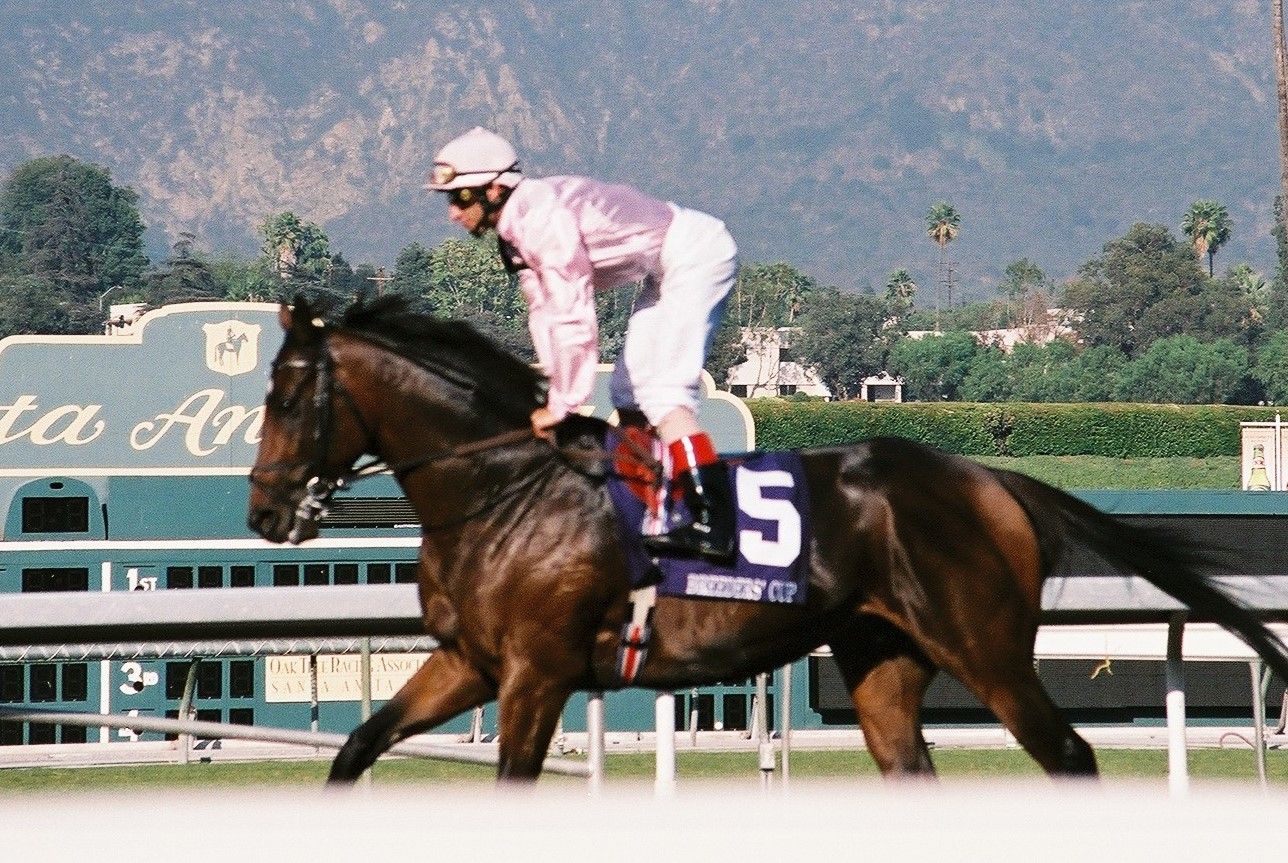
- Henrythenavigator at the 2008 Breeders' Cup
- Sire: Kingmambo
- Grandsire: Mr. Prospector
- Dam: Sequoyah
- Damsire: Sadler's Wells
- Sex: Stallion
- Foaled: 2005
- Country: United States
- Colour: Bay or Brown
- Breeder: Western Bloodstock
- Owner: Susan Magnier
- Trainer: Aidan O'Brien
- Record: 10: 6-2-1
- Earnings: £873,703

Major wins
- Coventry Stakes (2007); 2000 Guineas (2008); Irish 2,000 Guineas (2008); St. James's Palace Stakes (2008); Sussex Stakes (2008)
- Last updated on June 6, 2009

Henrythenavigator (foaled February 28, 2005) is an American-bred and Irish-trained Thoroughbred racehorse. He won the 2000 Guineas, the Irish 2,000 Guineas, the St. James's Palace Stakes and the Sussex Stakes in 2008.

After he finished second in the Breeders' Cup Classic it was announced that Henrythenavigator would retire to Ashford Stud, Kentucky (Coolmore's farm in Kentucky), to stand at stud beginning the 2009 season. For the 2010 season, he shuttled between Ashford Stud and Coolmore's Australian farm; he now shuttles between Coolmore's Ireland and Australia farms.

He is named after the Portuguese prince Henry the Navigator.

== Statistics ==
Date	Distance	Race	Grade	Track	Field	Finish	Winning Time	Winning (Losing) Margin	Winner (2nd Place)	Jockey	Ref
2007 – Two-year-old season											
May 6	1400m	Maiden Race		Gowran Park	9	1st	1:26.10	7 lengths	(Dick Morris)	Seamie Heffernan	
June 19	1200m	Coventry Stakes	G2	Ascot	20	1st	1:12.46	3/4 length	(Swiss Franc)	Mick Kinane	
August 12	1200m	Phoenix Stakes	G1	Curragh	6	2nd	1:18.89	(1 length)	Saoirse Abu	Kevin Manning	
August 25	1400m	Futurity Stakes	G2	Curragh	5	3rd	1:29.00	(3 lengths)	New Approach	Kevin Manning	
2008 – Three-year-old season											
May 3	1600m	2000 Guineas	G1	Newmarket	15	1st	1:39.14	nose	(New Approach)	Johnny Murtagh	
May 24	1600m	Irish 2,000 Guineas	G1	Curragh	5	1st	1:39.63	1 3/4 lengths	(New Approach)	Johnny Murtagh	
June 17	1600m	St James's Palace Stakes	G1	Ascot	8	1st	1:38.70	3/4 length	(Raven's Pass)	Johnny Murtagh	
July 30	1600m	Sussex Stakes	G1	Goodwood	6	1st	1:37.46	head	(Raven's Pass)	Johnny Murtagh	
September 7	1600m	Prix du Moulin de Longchamp	G1	Longchamp	11	5th	1:36.70	2 lengths	Goldikova	Johnny Murtagh	
September 27	1600m	Queen Elizabeth II Stakes	G1	Ascot	7	2nd	1:38.94	1 length	Raven's Pass	Johnny Murtagh	
October 25	2000m	Breeders' Cup Classic	G1	Santa Anita	12	2nd	1:59.27	1 3/4 lengths	Raven's Pass	John Velasquez	

== Stud record ==
Henrythenavigator attracted a number of top-class mares in his first season. They included: Vertigineux, the dam of Zenyatta; Rags To Riches, winner of the Belmont Stakes; Peeping Fawn, winner of the Irish Oaks; and, Mien, dam of Kentucky Derby winner Big Brown. As a breeding stallion he was not a conspicuous success and was eventually exported to Russia, but he did sire several good winners including Pedro the Great, George Vancouver (Breeders' Cup Juvenile Turf winner) and Sudirman.

== Pedigree ==
Pedigree of Henrythenavigator
Sire Kingmambo (USA)	Mr. Prospector (USA)	Raise a Native (USA)	Native Dancer (USA)
Sire Kingmambo (USA)	Mr. Prospector (USA)	Raise a Native (USA)	Raise You (USA)
Sire Kingmambo (USA)	Mr. Prospector (USA)	Gold Digger (USA)	Nashua (USA)
Sire Kingmambo (USA)	Mr. Prospector (USA)	Gold Digger (USA)	Sequence (USA)
Sire Kingmambo (USA)	Miesque (USA)	Nureyev (USA)	Northern Dancer (CAN)
Sire Kingmambo (USA)	Miesque (USA)	Nureyev (USA)	Special (USA)
Sire Kingmambo (USA)	Miesque (USA)	Pasodoble (USA)	Prove Out (USA)
Sire Kingmambo (USA)	Miesque (USA)	Pasodoble (USA)	Santa Quilla (FR)
Dam Sequoyah (IRE)	Sadler's Wells (USA)	Northern Dancer (CAN)	Nearctic (CAN)
Dam Sequoyah (IRE)	Sadler's Wells (USA)	Northern Dancer (CAN)	Natalma (USA)
Dam Sequoyah (IRE)	Sadler's Wells (USA)	Fairy Bridge (USA)	Bold Reason (USA)
Dam Sequoyah (IRE)	Sadler's Wells (USA)	Fairy Bridge (USA)	Special (USA)
Dam Sequoyah (IRE)	Brigid (USA)	Irish River (FR)	Riverman (USA)
Dam Sequoyah (IRE)	Brigid (USA)	Irish River (FR)	Irish Star (FR)
Dam Sequoyah (IRE)	Brigid (USA)	Luv Luvin' (USA)	Raise a Native (USA)
Dam Sequoyah (IRE)	Brigid (USA)	Luv Luvin' (USA)	Ringing Bells (USA)

- Henrythenavigator is inbred 3s x 4m to Raise a Native, meaning that the stallion appears in the third generation on the sire side and fourth generation on the dam side of Henrythenavigator's pedigree.
- Henrythenavigator is inbred 4s x 3m to Northern Dancer, meaning that the stallion appears in the fourth generation on the sire side and third generation on the dam side of Henrythenavigator's pedigree.
- Henrythenavigator is inbred 4s x 4m to Special, meaning that the mare appears in the fourth generation on the sire and dam side of Henrythenavigator's pedigree
