= Sequoyah (horse) =

Irish-bred Thoroughbred racehorse

- Sire: Sadler's Wells
- Grandsire: Northern Dancer
- Dam: Brigid
- Damsire: Irish River
- Sex: Mare
- Foaled: 9 March 1998
- Country: Ireland
- Colour: Bay
- Breeder: Brittas House Stud
- Owner: Susan Magnier
- Trainer: Aidan O'Brien
- Record: 9: 2-1-1
- Earnings: £105,738

Major wins
- Moyglare Stud Stakes (2000)

Sequoyah (9 March 1998) is an Irish Thoroughbred racehorse and broodmare. As a juvenile in 2000 she showed high-class form, winning the Group 1 Moyglare Stud Stakes and being placed in both the Railway Stakes and the Debutante Stakes. In the following year she failed to win but ran well against top quality competition to finish fourth in the Irish 1000 Guineas and the Irish Oaks. After her retirement from racing she became a successful broodmare, most notably producing Henrythenavigator.

== Background ==
Sequoyah was a bay mare bred in Ireland by the County Tipperary-based Brittas House Stud, which is owned by Peter Magnier, the brother of John Magnier. During her racing career she carried the colours of John Magnier's wife Susan and was trained by Aidan O'Brien at Ballydoyle.

She was from the thirteenth crop of foals sired by Sadler's Wells, who won the Irish 2000 Guineas, Eclipse Stakes and Irish Champion Stakes in 1984 went on to be the Champion sire on fourteen occasions. Sequoyah's dam Brigid showed modest racing ability, winning one minor race from five starts, but become a successful broodmare, producing several other good winners including Listen. She was a full-sister to Or Vison, the dam of Saffron Walden and Dolphin Street (Prix de la Forêt).

== Racing career ==
=== 2000: two-year-old season ===
Rather than making her debut in a maiden race Sequoyah began her racing career in the Group 3 Railway Stakes over six furlongs at the Curragh on 2 July and finished third of the five runners behind her stablemate Honours List. She was dropped in class for a seven-furlong maiden at Tipperary Racecourse later that month and started 4/5 favourite against six opponents. Ridden by Mick Kinane, she led from the start and won by one and a half lengths from the Jim Bolger-trained Mood Indigo. Aidan O'Brien said that the filly would "do nothing but improve".

On 20 August at the Curragh, Sequoyah started 4/1 favourite for the Listed Debutante Stakes, but after taking the lead in the last quarter mile she was caught in the final strides and beaten a short head by Affianced. Her stablemate Imagine was three lengths back in third. The filly was then stepped up to Group 1 class for the Group 1 Moyglare Stud Stakes at the same track on 3 September and started 9/4 favourite. Affianced and Imagine were again in opposition while the other seven runners included the British challenger Hotelgenie Dot Com who was made the 7/2 second choice in the betting. With Jamie Spencer in the saddle she raced towards the rear of the field as her unfancied stablemate Jungle Moon acted as pacemaker, before beginning to make progress entering the last quarter mile. She took the lead just inside the final furlong and drew away to by two and half lengths from Hotelgenie Dot Com.

On her final appearance of the season Sequoyah was sent to England to contest the Cheveley Park Stakes over six furlongs at Newmarket Racecourse on 26 September. After tracking the leaders she was outpaced in the closing stages and finished fifth of the thirteen runners behind Regal Rose.

=== 2001: three-year-old season ===
On her first run of 2001 Sequoyah ran in the Irish 2000 Guineas at the Curragh on 22 May in which she started a 14/1 outsider and came home fourth behind Imagine. In June she was sent to England for the Coronation Stakes at Royal Ascot in which she ran unplaced in a race won by the French-trained filly Banks Hill. In the following month she was stepped up in distance for the Irish Oaks over one and a half miles and finished fourth to Lailani after being slightly hampered in the closing stages. She ended her track career by finishing last to Lailani in the Nassau Stakes at Goodwood in August.

== Breeding record ==
Following her retirement from racing, Sequoyah became a broodmare for the Coolmore Stud. She produced at least five foals and three winners between 2003 and 2009:

- Queen Cleopatra, a bay filly, foaled in 2003, sired by Kingmambo. Won one race, namely the Derrinstown Stud 1,000 Guineas Trial.
- Abide With Me, bay colt, 2004, by Danehill. Won one race.
- Henrythenavigator, bay colt, 2005, by Kingmambo. Won six races including Coventry Stakes, 2000 Guineas, Irish 2,000 Guineas, St. James's Palace Stakes, Sussex Stakes.
- Benvenuto, chestnut colt, 2007, by Kingmambo. Failed to win in six races.
- Sail Away Home, bay filly, 2009, by Kingmambo. Unraced.

== Pedigree ==
Pedigree of Sequoyah (IRE), bay mare, 1998
Sire Sadler's Wells (USA) 1981	Northern Dancer (CAN); 1961	Nearctic	Nearco
Sire Sadler's Wells (USA) 1981	Northern Dancer (CAN); 1961	Nearctic	Lady Angela
Sire Sadler's Wells (USA) 1981	Northern Dancer (CAN); 1961	Natalma	Native Dancer
Sire Sadler's Wells (USA) 1981	Northern Dancer (CAN); 1961	Natalma	Almahmoud
Sire Sadler's Wells (USA) 1981	Fairy Bridge (USA); 1975	Bold Reason	Hail To Reason
Sire Sadler's Wells (USA) 1981	Fairy Bridge (USA); 1975	Bold Reason	Lalun
Sire Sadler's Wells (USA) 1981	Fairy Bridge (USA); 1975	Special	Forli
Sire Sadler's Wells (USA) 1981	Fairy Bridge (USA); 1975	Special	Thong
Dam Brigid (USA) 1991	Irish River (FR); 1966	Riverman	Never Bend
Dam Brigid (USA) 1991	Irish River (FR); 1966	Riverman	River Lady
Dam Brigid (USA) 1991	Irish River (FR); 1966	Irish Star	Klairon
Dam Brigid (USA) 1991	Irish River (FR); 1966	Irish Star	Botany Bay
Dam Brigid (USA) 1991	Luv Luvin (USA); 1977	Raise a Native	Native Dancer
Dam Brigid (USA) 1991	Luv Luvin (USA); 1977	Raise a Native	Raise You
Dam Brigid (USA) 1991	Luv Luvin (USA); 1977	Ringing Bells	Bold Lad
Dam Brigid (USA) 1991	Luv Luvin (USA); 1977	Ringing Bells	Dryad (Family 9-b)
