= Seattle Rhyme =

American-bred Thoroughbred racehorse

- Sire: Seattle Dancer
- Grandsire: Nijinsky
- Dam: Golden Rhyme
- Damsire: Dom Racine
- Sex: Colt
- Foaled: 20 February 1989
- Country: United States
- Colour: Chestnut
- Breeder: Meadow Grove Farm
- Owner: H J Senn
- Trainer: David Elsworth
- Record: 10: 3-2-3
- Earnings: £221,735

Major wins
- Stardom Stakes (1991); Racing Post Trophy (1991)

Seattle Rhyme (20 February 1989 – circa 1993) was an American-bred, British-trained Thoroughbred racehorse. He was one of the best two-year-olds in Britain in 1991 when he won three of his five races including the Stardom Stakes and the Racing Post Trophy and was regarded as a major contender for the following year's British Classic Races. He failed to win in a three-year-old season which was disrupted by injury but finished third in the International Stakes. He remained in training 1993 but never raced again and did not stand as a breeding stallion.

== Background ==
Seattle Rhyme was a chestnut colt with a broad white blaze and long white socks on his hind legs bred in Maryland by the Meadow Grove Farm. He was from the first crop of foals sired by Seattle Dancer, a horse who originally found fame as a yearling when he was auctioned for a world record price of $13.1 million in 1985. As a racehorse he showed well above average ability in a brief track career, winning the Derrinstown Stud Derby Trial and finishing second in the Grand Prix de Paris. The best of his other winners were Caffe Latte (Ramona Handicap), Que Belle (Preis der Diana) and the Kentucky Oaks runner-up Pike Place Dancer.

Seattle Rhyme's dam won two minor races from nine starts in Britain in 1982 and 1983 and later raced in the United States. She was descended from the broodmare Inquisition, making her a distant relative of the German Derby winner Surumu.

As a yearling in September 1990 the colt was consigned to the Keeneland sale and was bought for $55,000 by the bloodstock agent Charlie Gordon-Watson. The colt entered the ownership of H J Renn and was sent to Europe where he was trained throughout his racing career by David Elsworth.

== Racing career ==
=== 1991: two-year-old season ===
Seattle Rhyme began his racecourse career in the Granville Maiden Stakes over six furlongs at Ascot Racecourse on 27 July and started a 12/1 outsider in a seven-runner field. Ridden by Willie Carson he started poorly but recovered to take the lead inside the final furlong and won by one and a half lengths from the favourite Underwater. Pat Eddery took over the ride when the colt was moved up in class for the Group Three Solario Stakes at Sandown Park Racecourse on 30 August. After being restrained in the early stages he finished strongly for finish second, a neck behind the Mark Prescott-trained Chicmond, just ahead of Artic Tracker and Mack the Knife. Two weeks later he was moved up in distance for the Listed Stardom Stakes over one mile at Goodwood Racecourse and started favourite against five opponents. After turning into the straight in second place he took the lead two furlongs out and drew clear to win by three lengths from Rokeby with Alhijaz (later to win three Group One races in Italy) a length and away in third.

Cash Asmussen replaced Eddery when Seattle Rhyme was sent to France and stepped up to Group One level for the Grand Critérium over 1600 metres at Longchamp Racecourse on 5 October. Starting at odds of 5.8/1 he took second place in the straight before finishing third behind Arazi, Rainbow Corner with St Jovite in fourth. Three weeks later, with Asmussen again in the saddle. the colt started 2/1 favourite for the Racing Post Trophy over one mile at Doncaster Racecourse. His best of his seven opponents, according to the betting, were Thourios (third in the Dewhurst Stakes), Mack the Knife (second in the Royal Lodge Stakes) and Ninja Dancer (winner of the Autumn Stakes). Thourios and Ninja Dancer disputed the early lead with the favourite close behind. In the straight Seattle Rhyme moved forward, took the lead approaching the final furlong and drew away to win by three and a half lengths from Mack the Knife with the outsider Assessor (later to win the Prix Royal Oak and the Prix du Cadran) in third.

=== 1992: three-year-old season ===
Seattle Rhyme suffered injury problems, including a badly bruised hoof, as a three-year-old and missed the first half of the 1992 season, including the 2000 Guineas, Epsom Derby (for which he had been ante-post favourite) and Royal Ascot. He eventually returned in a minor event at York Racecourse on 10 July and started 1/2 favourite but was beaten into second by the Paul Cole-trained Speaker's House. Despite his defeat he was moved back up to Group One class and was matched against older horses for the first time in the International Stakes at the same track on 18 August. Starting a 16/1 outsider, he produced arguably his best effort as he finished third behind Rodrigo de Triano and All At Sea, with the other beaten horses including Dr Devious, Terimon and Kooyonga. On his next appearance, Seattle Rhyme started 8/11 favourite for the September Stakes over eleven furlongs at Kempton Park Racecourse on 5 September. He raced at the rear of the five-runner field in a slowly-run race and when the contest developed into a sprint he was unable to quicken and finished third behind Jeune and Red Bishop.

On 4 October, Seattle Rhyme was sent to France for the second time to contest the 1992 Prix de l'Arc de Triomphe over 2400 metres at Longchamp. Ridden by Michael Roberts, he raced prominently in the early stages but dropped away quickly in the straight to finish seventeenth of the eighteen runners behind Subotica. Two weeks after his run in France, Seattle Rhyme started a 20/1 outsider for the Champion Stakes at Newmarket Racecourse. On what was to be his final racecourse appearance he faded in the last quarter mile and finished eighth of the ten runners behind Rodrigo de Triano.

Seattle Rhyme remained in training in 1993 but never raced again. He never stood as a breeding stallion and may have died before the end 1993.

== Pedigree ==
Pedigree of Seattle Rhyme (USA), chestnut stallion, 1989
Sire Seattle Dancer (USA) 1984	Nijinsky (CAN); 1967	Northern Dancer	Nearctic
Sire Seattle Dancer (USA) 1984	Nijinsky (CAN); 1967	Northern Dancer	Natalma
Sire Seattle Dancer (USA) 1984	Nijinsky (CAN); 1967	Flaming Page	Bull Page
Sire Seattle Dancer (USA) 1984	Nijinsky (CAN); 1967	Flaming Page	Flaring Top
Sire Seattle Dancer (USA) 1984	My Charmer (USA); 1969	Poker	Round Table
Sire Seattle Dancer (USA) 1984	My Charmer (USA); 1969	Poker	Glamour
Sire Seattle Dancer (USA) 1984	My Charmer (USA); 1969	Fair Charmer	Jet Action
Sire Seattle Dancer (USA) 1984	My Charmer (USA); 1969	Fair Charmer	Myrtle Charm
Dam Golden Rhyme (IRE) 1980	Dom Racine (FR); 1975	Kalamoun	Zeddaan
Dam Golden Rhyme (IRE) 1980	Dom Racine (FR); 1975	Kalamoun	Khairunissa
Dam Golden Rhyme (IRE) 1980	Dom Racine (FR); 1975	La Ferte Milon	Timmy Lad
Dam Golden Rhyme (IRE) 1980	Dom Racine (FR); 1975	La Ferte Milon	Salamine
Dam Golden Rhyme (IRE) 1980	Silly Song (GB); 1972	Silly Season	Tom Fool
Dam Golden Rhyme (IRE) 1980	Silly Song (GB); 1972	Silly Season	Double Down
Dam Golden Rhyme (IRE) 1980	Silly Song (GB); 1972	Glider	Buisson Ardent
Dam Golden Rhyme (IRE) 1980	Silly Song (GB); 1972	Glider	Pop Room (Family:19)
