= Regal Rose =

British-bred Thoroughbred racehorse

- Sire: Danehill
- Grandsire: Danzig
- Dam: Ruthless Rose
- Damsire: Conquistador Cielo
- Sex: Mare
- Foaled: 7 May 1998
- Country: United Kingdom
- Colour: Bay
- Breeder: Cheveley Park Stud
- Owner: Cheveley Park Stud
- Trainer: Michael Stoute
- Record: 2: 2-0-0
- Earnings: £83,512

Major wins
- Cheveley Park Stakes (2000)

Regal Rose (foaled 7 May 1998) is a British Thoroughbred racehorse and broodmare. She was undefeated in a brief racing career which consisted of two races as a two-year-old in the summer and autumn of 2000. After winning a maiden race at Ascot Racecourse on her debut she defeated twelve opponents to take the Group One Cheveley Park Stakes in September. She remained in training in 2001 but suffered a leg injury in spring and was retired later that year without contesting another race. She has had some success as a broodmare.

== Background ==
Regal Rose is a "tall, scopey" bay mare with a white star bred and owned by the Newmarket-based Cheveley Park Stud.She was sired by Danehill, a sprinter who won the Cork and Orrery Stakes and Haydock Sprint Cup in 1989. He went on to become a highly successful breeding stallion, producing the winners of more than one thousand races including 156 at Group One/Grade I level. Among his best offspring are Dylan Thomas, Duke of Marmalade, Rock of Gibraltar George Washington and North Light.

Regal Rose's dam, Ruthless Rose showed no ability as a racehorse but came from a good family, being a daughter of Unfurled who also produced the successful American sprinter Pleasure Cay and the St James's Palace Stakes winner Shaadi. Unfurled was in turn a granddaughter of the broodmare Miel, whose other descendants have included Rodrigo de Triano and the Australian champion Snippets.

During her racing career, Regal Rose was trained at Newmarket by Michael Stoute.

== Racing career ==
=== 2000: two-year-old season ===
Regal Rose began her racing career at Ascot Racecourse on 28 July when she was one of eight fillies to contest a maiden race over six furlongs. Ridden by Johnny Murtagh, she started the 10/11 favourite ahead of Mujado who had finished second on her only previous start. She was restrained by Murtagh in the early stages before squeezing through a gap and moving into second behind Mujado in the last quarter mile. She began to show her lack of experience but finished strongly to take the lead 75 yards from the finish and won by three quarters of a length from Mujado with Velvet Glade in third.

After an absence of almost two months, Regal Rose was moved up sharply in class for the Group One Cheveley Park Stakes over six furlongs at Newmarket Racecourse on 26 September in which she was ridden by Frankie Dettori. Johnny Murtagh rode the stable's more fancied runner Enthused who started 11/8 favourite after wins in the Princess Margaret Stakes and the Lowther Stakes. Before the race Stoute explained that Enthused was a more precocious type whilst Regal Rose was likely to be better as a three-year-old. The Lowther Stakes runner-up Khulan was made second favourite on 9/2 with Regal Rose, despite her lack of experience being made the third choice in the betting on 11/2. The other ten runners included Sequoyah, the Aidan O'Brien-trained winner of the Moyglare Stud Stakes, Santolina (Sirenia Stakes), Lady Lahar (Futurity Stakes) and Autumnal (Windsor Castle Stakes). Regal Rose started slowly and fought against Dettori's attempts to restrain her as the 66/1 outsider Toroca set the pace. The filly began to make progress at half way and overtook Toroca approaching the final furlong. She hung slightly to the right in the closing stages but stayed on to win by a length, with Toroca getting the best of a four-way photo-finish for second ahead of Mala Mala, Autumnal and Sequoyah. After the race Dettori commented "She has a good cruising speed and an excellent turn of foot. With a faster pace she would have been more impressive".

=== 2001: three-year-old season ===
As a three-year-old Regal Rose was aimed at the 1000 Guineas and was fancied for the race despite missing the trial races owing to the prevailing soft ground, but then sustained an injury to her left hind leg. It was hoped that the filly would return at Royal Ascot in June but she had further training problems, missed the race and was retired in August without running again. Cheveley Park's manager Chris Richardson commented "She had a lot of ability, but unfortunately had a setback in the spring and other niggling problems. We were hoping she would come back at first, but it was thought she would not perform back at the level we had hoped. She's an unbeaten Group 1 winner and it's disappointing we haven't seen her back, as we believe she was very good and wanted her to have the opportunity to reaffirm that".

== Breeding record ==
Regal Rose was retired from racing to become a broodmare at Cheveley Park Stud. She has produced seven foals and four winners:

- Regal Royale, a bay colt (later gelded), foaled in 2003, sired by Medicean. Won seven races.
- Regal Riband, bay filly, 2004, by Fantastic Light. Won one race. Dam of Regal Realm (Prestige Stakes).
- Merchant of Medici, bay colt (later gelded), 2007, by Medicean. Won seven races.
- Regal Heiress, bay filly, 2008, by Pivotal. Failed to win in four races.
- Royal Banker, bay colt (later gelded), by Medicean. Won two races.
- Regal Flame, bay filly, 2012, by Pivotal. Unraced.
- Bobby Wheeler, bay colt, 2013, by Pivotal. Won one race to date (December 2015).

== Pedigree ==
Pedigree of Regal Rose (GB), bay mare, 1998
| Sire Danehill (USA) 1986 | Danzig (USA); 1977 | Northern Dancer | Nearctic |
| Sire Danehill (USA) 1986 | Danzig (USA); 1977 | Northern Dancer | Natalma* |
| Sire Danehill (USA) 1986 | Danzig (USA); 1977 | Pas de Nom | Admiral's Voyage |
| Sire Danehill (USA) 1986 | Danzig (USA); 1977 | Pas de Nom | Petitioner |
| Sire Danehill (USA) 1986 | Razyana (USA); 1981 | His Majesty | Ribot |
| Sire Danehill (USA) 1986 | Razyana (USA); 1981 | His Majesty | Flower Bowl |
| Sire Danehill (USA) 1986 | Razyana (USA); 1981 | Spring Adieu | Buckpasser |
| Sire Danehill (USA) 1986 | Razyana (USA); 1981 | Spring Adieu | Natalma* |
| Dam Ruthless Rose (USA) 1985 | Conquistador Cielo (USA); 1979 | Mr. Prospector | Raise a Native |
| Dam Ruthless Rose (USA) 1985 | Conquistador Cielo (USA); 1979 | Mr. Prospector | Gold Digger |
| Dam Ruthless Rose (USA) 1985 | Conquistador Cielo (USA); 1979 | K D Princess | Bold Commander |
| Dam Ruthless Rose (USA) 1985 | Conquistador Cielo (USA); 1979 | K D Princess | Tammy's Turn |
| Dam Ruthless Rose (USA) 1985 | Unfurled (USA); 1974 | Hoist The Flag | Tom Rolfe |
| Dam Ruthless Rose (USA) 1985 | Unfurled (USA); 1974 | Hoist The Flag | Wavy Navy |
| Dam Ruthless Rose (USA) 1985 | Unfurled (USA); 1974 | Lemon Souffle | John's Joy |
| Dam Ruthless Rose (USA) 1985 | Unfurled (USA); 1974 | Lemon Souffle | Miel (Family: 20-a) |

- Like all of Danehill's offspring Regal Rose is inbred 4x4 to the mare Natalma. This means that she occurs twice in the fourth generation of her pedigree.
