= Shaadi (horse) =

American-bred Thoroughbred racehorse

- Sire: Danzig
- Grandsire: Northern Dancer
- Dam: Unfurled
- Damsire: Hoist The Flag
- Sex: Stallion
- Foaled: 20 May 1986
- Country: United States
- Colour: Bay
- Breeder: Edward A Cox Jr.
- Owner: Sheikh Mohammed
- Trainer: Michael Stoute
- Record: 8: 5-0-0
- Earnings: £264,275

Major wins
- Queen's Own Yorkshire Dragoons Stakes (1988); Craven Stakes (1989); Irish 2,000 Guineas (1989); St James's Palace Stakes (1989)

Shaadi (20 May 1986 – 8 January 2008) was an American-bred, British-trained Thoroughbred racehorse and sire. He showed very promising form as a two-year-old in 1988 when he won both of his races. In the following year he won the Craven Stakes but then ran very poorly in the 2000 Guineas. He produced his best form in his next two races, recording decisive wins in the Irish 2,000 Guineas and the St James's Palace Stakes. He was unplaced in his two remaining races and was retired from racing at the end of the season. He stood as a breeding stallion in Europe and Japan, having limited success as a sire of winners.

== Background ==
Shaadi was a dark-coated bay horse with two white socks, bred in Kentucky by Edward A Cox Jr. He was an unusually late foal, being born on 20 May 1986. His sire Danzig, who ran only three times before his career was ended by injury, was a highly successful stallion who sired the winners of more than fifty Grade I/Group One races. His offspring include the champions Chief's Crown, Dayjur and Lure as well as the important stallion Danehill. Shaadi's dam Unfurled won one race and also produced the successful American sprinter Pleasure Cay and the Cheveley Park Stakes winner Regal Rose. She was a granddaughter of the broodmare Miel, whose other descendants have included Rodrigo de Triano and the Australian champion Snippets.

As a yearling was consigned to the Keenland Select sale in July 1987 and was bought for $900,000 by Sheikh Mohammed's Darley Stud Management. The colt was sent to Europe where he was sent into training with Michael Stoute at Newmarket, Suffolk. He was ridden in all but one of his races by Walter Swinburn.

== Racing career ==
=== 1988: two-year-old season ===
Shaadi never contested a maiden race beginning his racing career in the Queen's Own Yorkshire Dragoons Stakes (now the Flying Scotsman Stakes) over seven furlongs at Doncaster Racecourse on 7 September. Starting the 2/1 second favourite, he took the lead at half way and drew away to win by four lengths from the filly Magic Gleam (later to win the Child Stakes) and Gran Alba (Christmas Hurdle) four lengths back in third. Later that month he started odds-on favourite against six opponents for the Mornington Stakes at Ascot Racecourse and won by a head from Pride of Araby, to whom he was conceding six pounds.

=== 1989: three-year-old season ===
On his first appearance of the 1989 season, Shaadi contested the Craven Stakes (a major trial race for the 2000 Guineas) over the Rowley Mile at Newmarket Racecourse. He started the 5/2 favourite ahead of Al Hareb (Racing Post Trophy), Citidancer, Exbourne and Frequent Flyer. He tracked the leader Exbourne before taking the lead a furlong out and running on to win by two and a half lengths. Sixteen days later, over the same course and distance, Shaadi started the 5/1 third favourite behind Nashwan and the Vincent O'Brien-trained Saratogan in a fourteen-runner field for the 2000 Guineas. He never looked likely to win and was eased down by Swinburn in the closing stages, finishing eleventh, almost twenty lengths behind the winner Nashwan.

Two weeks after his poor run at Newmarket, Shaadi was sent to Ireland for the Irish 2000 Guineas at the Curragh Racecourse for which he started 7/2 second favourite behind Danehill. The O'Brien stable fielded Saratogan as well as the Beresford Stakes winner Classic Fame whilst the most fancied of the other runners was the Alex Scott-trained Great Commotion. Swinburn settled Shaadi behind the leaders before taking the lead two furlongs from the finish. The colt ran on well in the closing stages and won by two and a half lengths from Great Commotion, with the 25/1 outsider Distant Relative taking third ahead of Danehill.

On 20 June Shaadi was one of five colts to contest the 144th edition of the St James's Palace Stakes at Royal Ascot and started the 6/4 favourite, despite rumours of a poor performance in a training gallop. Great Commotion was again among his opponents but his most serious rival in the betting was the Henry Cecil-trained Thorn Dance, the winner of the Acomb Stakes. The other two runners were Scenic who had not been seen since dead-heating for the Dewhurst Stakes in the previous October and the Guy Harwood-trained outsider Greensmith. In a change of tactics, Swinburn sent the colt into the lead from the start and set the pace before accelerating in the straight. He won by two lengths from Greensmith, with Scenic a length further back in third.

Shaadi was matched against older horses for the first time in the Sussex Stakes at Goodwood Racecourse on 29 July. In and exceptionally strong field he started 7/1 fourth choice in the betting behind Warning, Zilzal and Markofdistinction. Ridden by Steve Cauthen he led the field two furlongs out but weakened to finish sixth of the seven runners behind Zilzal. After a lengthy break, Shaadi was brought back in distance and sent to France for the Prix de la Forêt over 1400 metres at Longchamp Racecourse on 29 October. He looked outpaced in the closing stages and finished fifth of the eight runners behind the four-year-old filly Gabina.

== Stud record ==
Shaadi stood as a breeding stallion in Europe for three seasons before being exported to Japan. The best of his European-bred runners included Wizard King (Beeswing Stakes), Papering (Premio Lydia Tesio), Velvet Moon (Lowther Stakes, dam of Moon Ballad) and Desidera (Grosser Preis von Berlin). He died on 8 January 2008 in Japan.

== Pedigree ==
Pedigree of Shaadi (USA), bay stallion, 1986
Sire Danzig (USA) 1977	Northern Dancer (CAN); 1961	Nearctic	Nearco
Sire Danzig (USA) 1977	Northern Dancer (CAN); 1961	Nearctic	Lady Angela
Sire Danzig (USA) 1977	Northern Dancer (CAN); 1961	Natalma	Native Dancer
Sire Danzig (USA) 1977	Northern Dancer (CAN); 1961	Natalma	Almahmoud
Sire Danzig (USA) 1977	Pas de Nom (USA); 1968	Admiral's Voyage	Crafty Admiral
Sire Danzig (USA) 1977	Pas de Nom (USA); 1968	Admiral's Voyage	Olympia Lou
Sire Danzig (USA) 1977	Pas de Nom (USA); 1968	Petitioner	Petition
Sire Danzig (USA) 1977	Pas de Nom (USA); 1968	Petitioner	Steady Aim
Dam Unfurled (USA) 1974	Hoist The Flag (USA); 1968	Tom Rolfe	Ribot
Dam Unfurled (USA) 1974	Hoist The Flag (USA); 1968	Tom Rolfe	Pocahontas
Dam Unfurled (USA) 1974	Hoist The Flag (USA); 1968	Wavy Navy	War Admiral
Dam Unfurled (USA) 1974	Hoist The Flag (USA); 1968	Wavy Navy	Triomphe
Dam Unfurled (USA) 1974	Lemon Souffle (USA); 1958	Johns Joy	Bull Dog
Dam Unfurled (USA) 1974	Lemon Souffle (USA); 1958	Johns Joy	My Auntie
Dam Unfurled (USA) 1974	Lemon Souffle (USA); 1958	Miel	Jamestown
Dam Unfurled (USA) 1974	Lemon Souffle (USA); 1958	Miel	Tedmelia (Family: 20-a)
