= Pedro the Great =

American-bred Thoroughbred racehorse

- Sire: Henrythenavigator
- Grandsire: Kingmambo
- Dam: Glatisant
- Damsire: Rainbow Quest
- Sex: Stallion
- Foaled: 27 March 2010
- Country: United States
- Colour: Bay
- Breeder: Hascombe Stud
- Owner: Derrick Smith, Susan Magnier & Michael Tabor
- Trainer: Aidan O'Brien
- Record: 5: 2-0-0
- Earnings: £111,121

Major wins
- Phoenix Stakes (2012)

Pedro the Great (27 March 2010 – 9 August 2019) is an American-bred, Irish-trained Thoroughbred racehorse and sire. He raced only as a two-year-old in 2012 when he won two of his five races including the Group 1 Phoenix Stakes. He was retired from racing in 2013 and became a breeding stallion in France.

== Background ==
Pedro the Great is a bay horse bred in Kentucky by Anthony Oppenheimer's Hascombe Stud. In 2011 he was sent to England and put up for the auction at the Tattersalls October Yearling Sale where he was bought for 150,000 guineas by John Magnier of the Coolmore Stud. During his racing career he was trained by Aidan O'Brien at Ballydoyle. Like many Coolmore horses the details of his ownership changed from race to race: he sometimes raced in the colours of Michael Tabor while on other occasions he was described as being owned by a partnership of Tabor, Susan Magnier and Derrick Smith.

He was sired by Henrythenavigator who won the 2000 Guineas, Irish 2000 Guineas, St James's Palace Stakes and Sussex Stakes in 2008. As a breeding stallion he was not a conspicuous success and was eventually exported to Russia, but he did sire several other good winners including George Vancouver (Breeders' Cup Juvenile Turf) and Sudirman. Pedro the Great's dam Glatisant was a high-class racemare who won the Prestige Stakes in 1993. She was even better as a broodmare, producing the 2000 Guineas winner Footstepsinthesand and being the female-line ancestor of Power and Rivet.

== Racing career ==
=== 2012: two-year-old season ===
Rather than making his debut in a maiden race, Pedro the Great began his track career in the Listed Rochestown Stakes over six furlongs at Naas Racecourse on 4 June. Ridden by his trainer's son Joseph, he started at odds of 8/1 and finished fifth of the six runners behind Dawn Approach. On 21 June he was dropped back in class and started favourite for a maiden at Leopardstown in which he was partnered by Seamie Heffernan. He led from the start and drew away from his five opponents in the final furlong to win by four and a quarter lengths from the Jim Bolger-trained Wexford Opera. Nine days after his win at Leopardstown the colt was moved up to Group 3 class for the Railway Stakes at the Curragh and started second favourite behind his stablemate Cristoforo Colombo. After racing in second place for most of the way he faded in the closing stages and finished fifth behind the David Wachman-trained Probably.

The Group 1 Phoenix Stakes at Leopardstown on 12 August attracted a field of six runners and Pedro the Great, with Heffernan in the saddle, started the 10/1 fourth choice in the betting. Probably started favourite ahead of Cristoforo Colombo and the British challenger Bungle Inthejungle (Molecomb Stakes) while the other two runners were Leitir Mor and the filly Lottie Dod. The horses raced up the stands side (the left hand side from the jockeys' viewpoint) with Pedro the Great settling in fifth before switching to the right and taking the lead in the last quarter mile. The complexion of the race changed abruptly a furlong out when Cristoforo Colombo, who was going well and still in contention, slipped and fell a furlong out. In the closing stages Pedro the Great drew away from his remaining rivals and won "comfortably" by two and three quarter lengths from Leitir Mor. Aidan O'Brien commented "He won his maiden very impressively. He was a bit fresh the last day and we decided to take our time with him today and he settled well. He won’t mind stepping up to seven furlongs".

In October Pedro the Great was sent to France to contest the Prix Jean-Luc Lagardère over 1400 metres at Longchamp Racecourse and started 9/2 third favourite. After being restrained by Joseph O'Brien in the early stages he made some progress approaching the last 400 metres but never looked likely to threaten the leaders and finished fifth to Olympic Glory.

== Stud record ==
Pedro the Great remained in training as a three-year-old but did not race again: his retirement was announced in November 2013. He began his stud career at the Haras de La Haie Neuve in Brittany. Died on 9 August 2019.

== Pedigree ==
Pedigree of Pedro the Great (USA), bay stallion, 2010
Sire Henrythenavigator (USA) 2005	Kingmambo (USA); 1990	Mr. Prospector	Raise a Native
Sire Henrythenavigator (USA) 2005	Kingmambo (USA); 1990	Mr. Prospector	Gold Digger
Sire Henrythenavigator (USA) 2005	Kingmambo (USA); 1990	Miesque	Nureyev
Sire Henrythenavigator (USA) 2005	Kingmambo (USA); 1990	Miesque	Pasadoble
Sire Henrythenavigator (USA) 2005	Sequoyah (IRE); 1998	Sadler's Wells	Northern Dancer
Sire Henrythenavigator (USA) 2005	Sequoyah (IRE); 1998	Sadler's Wells	Fairy Bridge
Sire Henrythenavigator (USA) 2005	Sequoyah (IRE); 1998	Brigid	Irish River
Sire Henrythenavigator (USA) 2005	Sequoyah (IRE); 1998	Brigid	Luv Luvin'
Dam Glatisant (GB) 1991	Rainbow Quest (USA); 1981	Blushing Groom	Red God
Dam Glatisant (GB) 1991	Rainbow Quest (USA); 1981	Blushing Groom	Runaway Bride
Dam Glatisant (GB) 1991	Rainbow Quest (USA); 1981	I Will Follow	Herbager
Dam Glatisant (GB) 1991	Rainbow Quest (USA); 1981	I Will Follow	Where You Lead
Dam Glatisant (GB) 1991	Dancing Rocks (GB); 1979	Green Dancer	Nijinsky
Dam Glatisant (GB) 1991	Dancing Rocks (GB); 1979	Green Dancer	Green Valley
Dam Glatisant (GB) 1991	Dancing Rocks (GB); 1979	Croda Rossa	Grey Sovereign
Dam Glatisant (GB) 1991	Dancing Rocks (GB); 1979	Croda Rossa	Crenelle (Family: 1-e)
