= Prix Corrida =

Flat horse race in France

- Class: Group 2
- Location: Saint-Cloud Racecourse; Saint-Cloud, France
- Inaugurated: 1979
- Race type: Flat / Thoroughbred
- Website: france-galop.com

Race information
- Distance: 2,100 metres (1m 2½f)
- Surface: Turf
- Track: left-handed
- Qualification: Four-years-old and up fillies & mares
- Weight: 56 kg Allowances; 1 kg if not Group winner * Penalties; 2 kg for Group 1 winners * 1 kg for Group 2 winners * * since June 1 last year
- Purse: €130,000 (2017); 1st: €74,100

Prix Corrida
2023
Above The Curve	Mqse De Sevigne	India

Previous years
2022
Sweet Lady	Burgarita	Amazing Grace
2021
Ebaiyra	Raabihah	No Limit Credit

2020-2011
2020
Ambition	Grand Glory	Spirit Of Nelson
2019
Morgan Le Faye	Listen In	Shahnaza
2018
Bateel	Bebe D'Amour	Navaro Girl
2017
Armande	That Which Is Not	Haggle
2016
Speedy Boarding	Siljan's Saga	Candarliya
2015
Treve	We Are	Mayhem
2014
Siljan's Saga	Vally Jem	Daksha
2013
Grace Lady	Fate	Romantica
2012
Solemia	Shareta	Siyouma
2011
Sarafina	Announce	One Clever Cat

2010–2000
2010
Plumania	Celimene	Daryakana
2009
Alpine Rose	Danse Grecque	La Boum
2008
Fair Breeze	La Boum	Believe Me
2007
Mandesha	Macleya	Musical Way
2006
Pride	Paita	Ysoldina
2005
Elopa	Russian Hill	Diamond Tango
2004
Actrice	Visorama	Pride
2003
Trumbaka	Bonne Gargotte	Amathia
2001
Acceleration	Beyond The Waves	Well Minded
2000
Super Tassa	War Game	Turbotiere

The Prix Corrida is a Group 2 flat horse race in France open to thoroughbred fillies and mares aged four years or older. It is run at Saint-Cloud over a distance of 2,100 metres (about 1 mile and 2½ furlongs), and it is scheduled to take place each year in May.

== History ==
The event is named after the successful mare Corrida, a dual winner of the Prix de l'Arc de Triomphe in the 1930s. A different race with the same title was created at Le Tremblay in 1950, and it was staged each year until the venue closed in 1967. It was transferred to Vichy for the following two seasons, and it was discontinued thereafter.

The present Prix Corrida was established at Saint-Cloud in 1979, and it originally held Group 3 status. It was contested at Évry in 1994 and 1995, and at Lyon over 2,200 metres from 1996 to 1999. It was promoted to Group 2 level in 2004.

== Records ==
Most successful horse:

- no horse has won this race more than once

Leading jockey (5 wins):

- Olivier Peslier – Camporese (1997), Trumbaka (2003), Actrice (2004), Plumania (2010), Solemia (2012)

Leading trainer (8 wins):

- André Fabre – Fly Me (1984), Galla Placidia (1986), Diese (1993), Luna Mareza (1995), Plumania (2010), Armande (2017), Morgan Le Faye (2019), Pensee Du Jour (2024)

Leading owner (5 wins):

- Wertheimer et Frère – Trumbaka (2003), Plumania (2010), Solemia (2012), Pensee Du Jour (2024), Aventure (2025)

== Winners ==
Year	Winner	Age	Jockey	Trainer	Owner	Time
1979	Tintagel	4	Henri Samani	J. R. Lyon	Marietta Fox-Pitt
1980	Ho Han Wai	4	Alain Lequeux	Aage Paus	Sir Douglas Clague
1981	Daeltown	4	Alain Lequeux	David Smaga	Xavier Beau
1982	La Hougue	4	Georges Doleuze	Guy Bonnaventure	Naji Pharaon
1983	Radiance	4	Alfred Gibert	Edouard Bartholomew	Sir Robin McAlpine
1984	Fly Me	4	Freddy Head	André Fabre	Moufid F. Dabaghi
1985	Lady Tamara	4	Henri Samani	Jean-Marie Béguigné	N. A. Souter
1986	Galla Placidia	4	Alfred Gibert	André Fabre	William Kazan
1987	Bonshamile	4	Dominique Regnard	John Hammond	Charles E. Schmidt	2:16.50
1988	Birthday Fever	4	Henri Samani	J. C. Cunnington	Hubertus Liebrecht	2:31.60
1989	Athyka	4	Cash Asmussen	Criquette Head	Jacques Wertheimer
1990	Ode	4	Dominique Boeuf	Élie Lellouche	Daniel Wildenstein	2:14.30
1991	Echoes	4	Freddy Head	Dominique Sépulchre	Stavros Niarchos	2:17.30
1992	Fabulous Hostess	4	Corey Black	Criquette Head	Jacques Wertheimer	2:15.30
1993	Diese	4	Thierry Jarnet	André Fabre	Khalid Abdullah	2:17.40
1994	Elacata	4	Guy Guignard	Bruno Schütz	Stall Marcassargues	2:13.45
1995	Hollywood Dream	4	Cash Asmussen	Uwe Ostmann	Gestüt Ittlingen	2:23.13
1996	Luna Mareza	4	Thierry Jarnet	André Fabre	Jean-Luc Lagardère	2:22.90
1997	Camporese	4	Olivier Peslier	Peter Chapple-Hyam	Michael Tabor	2:21.40
1998	Lexa	4	Dominique Boeuf	Helena van Zuylen	Baron Thierry van Zuylen	2:16.10
1999	Majoune	4	Sébastien Beaumard	Jean-Pierre Pelat	Claude Ankri	2:20.40
2000	Super Tassa	4	Thierry Thulliez	Valfredo Valiani	Valfredo Valiani	2:16.50
2001	Acceleration	4	Stéphane Pasquier	Valérie Dissaux	Hillbrow Breeding Ltd	2:12.90
2002	Jomana	4	Olivier Plaçais	Henri-Alex Pantall	Sheikh Mohammed	2:19.70
2003	Trumbaka	4	Olivier Peslier	Criquette Head-Maarek	Wertheimer et Frère	2:20.70
2004	Actrice	4	Olivier Peslier	Élie Lellouche	Ecurie Wildenstein	2:13.50
2005	Elopa	4	Andrasch Starke	Andreas Schütz	Stall Gamshof	2:15.50
2006	Pride	6	Christophe Lemaire	Alain de Royer-Dupré	NP Bloodstock Ltd	2:17.20
2007	Mandesha	4	Christophe Soumillon	Alain de Royer-Dupré	Zahra Aga Khan	2:25.30
2008	Fair Breeze	5	Jean-Pierre Carvalho	Mario Hofer	Stall Margarethe	2:15.90
2009	Alpine Rose	4	Gérald Mossé	Alain de Royer-Dupré	Ecurie des Monceaux et al.	2:16.00
2010	Plumania	4	Olivier Peslier	André Fabre	Wertheimer et Frère	2:13.60
2011	Sarafina	4	Christophe Lemaire	Alain de Royer-Dupré	HH Aga Khan IV	2:10.50
2012	Solemia	4	Olivier Peslier	Carlos Laffon-Parias	Wertheimer et Frère	2:11.74
2013	Grace Lady	4	Gérald Mossé	Tatiana Puitg	Ecurie Victoria Dreams	2:21.16
2014	Siljan's Saga	4	Pierre-Charles Boudot	Jean-Pierre Gauvin	De Besset & Tassin	2:16.19
2015	Treve	5	Thierry Jarnet	Criquette Head-Maarek	Al Shaqab Racing	2:12.99
2016	Speedy Boarding	4	Frederik Tylicki	James Fanshawe	Helena Springfield Ltd	2:16.17
2017	Armande	4	Pierre-Charles Boudot	André Fabre	O'Reilly & Rothschild	2:16.69
2018	Bateel	6	Pierre-Charles Boudot	Francis-Henri Graffard	Al Asayl Bloodstock Ltd	2:10.88
2019	Morgan Le Faye	5	Mickael Barzalona	André Fabre	Godolphin	2:19.50
2020	Ambition (Note: The 2020 race was run at Lyon Parilly in June due to the COVID-19 pandemic in France)	4	Mickael Barzalona	Xavier Thomas-Demeaulte	James Rowsell & Steve Ashley	2:26.72
2021	Ebaiyra	4	Christophe Soumillon	Alain de Royer-Dupré	HH Aga Khan IV	2:24.04
2022	Sweet Lady	4	Ioritz Mendizabal	Francis-Henri Graffard	Gemini Stud	2:14.11
2023	Above The Curve	4	Maxime Guyon	Joseph O'Brien	Magnier / Tabor / Smith / Westerberg	2:14.17
2024	Pensee Du Jour	4	Maxime Guyon	André Fabre	Wertheimer et Frère	2:12.74
2025	Aventure	4	Maxime Guyon	Christophe Ferland	Wertheimer et Frère	2:12.68
2026	Aventure (Note: The 2026 race was run at Longchamp)	5	Maxime Guyon	Christophe Ferland	Wertheimer et Frère	2:11:39

== See also ==
- List of French flat horse races

== Bibliography ==
- France Galop / Racing Post:
  - 1979, 1980, 1981, 1982, 1983, 1984, 1985, 1986, 1987, 1988
  - 1989, 1990, 1991, 1992, 1993, 1994, 1995, 1996, 1997, 1998
  - 1999, 2000, 2001, 2002, 2003, 2004, 2005, 2006, 2007, 2008
  - 2009, 2010, 2011, 2012, 2013, 2014, 2015, 2016, 2017, 2018
  - 2019, 2020, 2021, 2022, 2023, 2024, 2025, 2026

- france-galop.com – A Brief History: Prix Corrida.
- galop.courses-france.com – Prix Corrida – Palmarès depuis 1979.
- galopp-sieger.de – Prix Corrida.
- horseracingintfed.com – International Federation of Horseracing Authorities – Prix Corrida (2017).
- pedigreequery.com – Prix Corrida – Saint-Cloud.
