= Premio Carlo d'Alessio =

Flat horse race in Italy

- Class: Listed
- Location: Capannelle Racecourse; Rome, Italy
- Race type: Flat / Thoroughbred
- Website: Capannelle

Race information
- Distance: 2,400 metres (1½ miles)
- Surface: Turf
- Track: Right-handed
- Qualification: Four-years-old and up
- Weight: 55 kg Allowances; 1½ kg for fillies and mares Penalties; 3½ kg for Group 1 winners * 2 kg for Group 2 winners * 1 kg for Group 3 winners * 1 kg if two Listed wins * * since August 1 last year
- Purse: €61,600 (2015); 1st: €23,800

The Premio Carlo d'Alessio is a Listed flat horse race in Italy open to thoroughbreds aged four years or older. It is run over a distance of 2,400 metres (about 1½ miles) at Capannelle in May.

== History ==
The race was originally called the Premio Ellington. It was named after Ellington, the sire of a leading 19th-century broodmare in Picciola, Italy.

The Premio Ellington was run over 2,400 metres. For a period it held Group 2 status.

The event was renamed in memory of Carlo d'Alessio, a successful racehorse owner, in 2000. D'Alessio's horses included Bolkonski, Le Moss and Wollow.

The Premio Carlo d'Alessio was extended to 2,800 metres in 2001. It reverted to 2,400 metres in 2005. It was downgraded to Group 3 level in 2006, downgraded to Listed level in 2024.

== Records ==
Most successful horse since 1977 (2 wins):

- Luso – 1996, 1997

Leading jockey since 1987 (4 wins):

- Dario Vargiu – Exhibit One (2007), Gimmy (2008), Il Fenomeno (2010), Time Chant (2016)

Leading trainer since 1987 (5 wins):

- Luigi Camici – Tony Bin (1987), Knight Line Dancer (1989), Big Tobin (1993), Ivan Luis (1999), Groom Tesse (2006)

== Winners since 1987 ==
Year	Winner	Age	Jockey	Trainer	Time
1987	Tony Bin	4	Michel Jerome	Luigi Camici	2:37.20
1988	Jung	4	Marco Paganini	Lorenzo Brogi	2:31.90
1989	Knight Line Dancer	4	Fernando Jovine	Luigi Camici	2:28.80
1990	Artic Envoy	4	Fernando Jovine	Paul Kelleway	2:31.00
1991	Run Don't Fly	5	Richard Quinn	Paul Cole	2:27.90
1992	Secret Haunt	4	Frankie Dettori	Luca Cumani	2:26.70
1993	Big Tobin	4	Otello Fancera	Luigi Camici	2:26.80
1994	Captain Horatius	5	Lester Piggott	John Dunlop	2:30.40
1995	Laroche	4	Peter Schiergen	Heinz Jentzsch	2:26.40
1996	Luso	4	Brett Doyle	Clive Brittain	2:29.80
1997	Luso	5	Brett Doyle	Clive Brittain	2:25.30
1998	War Declaration	4	Massimiliano Tellini	Bruno Grizzetti	2:32.30
1999	Ivan Luis	5	Otello Fancera	Luigi Camici	2:24.80
2000	Hamond	5	Willie Ryan	Andreas Wöhler	2:29.90
2001	Super Tassa	5	Palmerio Agus	Valfredo Valiani	2:57.70
2002	Narrative	4	Ted Durcan	Saeed bin Suroor	3:00.30
2003	Maktub	4	Mirco Demuro	Bruno Grizzetti	2:57.50
2004	Simonas	5	Eduardo Pedroza	Ralf Suerland	3:00.40
2005	Electrocutionist	4	Edmondo Botti	Valfredo Valiani	2:27.10
2006	Groom Tesse	5	Stefano Landi	Luigi Camici	2:28.90
2007	Exhibit One	5	Dario Vargiu	Valfredo Valiani	2:30.90
2008	Gimmy	4	Dario Vargiu	Bruno Grizzetti	2:30.20
2009	Voila Ici	4	Mirco Demuro	Vittorio Caruso	2:30.00
2010	Il Fenomeno	4	Dario Vargiu	Bruno Grizzetti	2:35.20
2011	Jakkalberry	5	Fabio Branca	Edmondo Botti	2:28.10
2012	Lake Drop	4	Cristian Demuro	Stefano Botti	2:30.00
2013	Romantic Wave	4	Fabio Branca	Stefano Botti	2:28.22
2014	Orsino	7	Mirco Demuro	Ralf Rohne	2:28.03
2015	Dylan Mouth	4	Fabio Branca	Stefano Botti	2:26.40
2016	Time Chant	4	Dario Vargiu	Stefano Botti	2:25.40
2017	Full Drago	4	Cristian Demuro	Stefano Botti	2:28.90
2018	Chasedown	4	Dario Vargiu	Alduino Botti	2:26.60
2019	Assiro	4	Andrea Mezzafesta	Raffaele Biondi	2:33.50
2020	Walderbe (Note: The 2020 race took place in July due to the COVID-19 pandemic in Italy)	4	Mickaelle Michel	Ralf Rohne	2:26.38
2021	Baptism	4	Cristian Demuro	Alduino Botti	2:28.4
2022	Atzeco	4	Dario Vargiu	Alduino Botti	2:28.4
2023	Tempesti	4	Frankie Dettori	Riccardo Santini	2:31.1
2025	Flag's Up	7	Cristian Demuro	Stefano Botti	2:31.3

== Earlier winners ==
- 1977: Coltinger
- 1978: Rue de la Paix
- 1979: Montorselli
- 1980: Sifounas
- 1981: Ladislao di Oppelm
- 1982: Scouting Miller
- 1983: Phebis
- 1984: Alzao
- 1985: Shulich
- 1986: Tom Seymour

== See also ==
- List of Italian flat horse races
