= Flying Scotsman Stakes =

Flat horse race in Britain

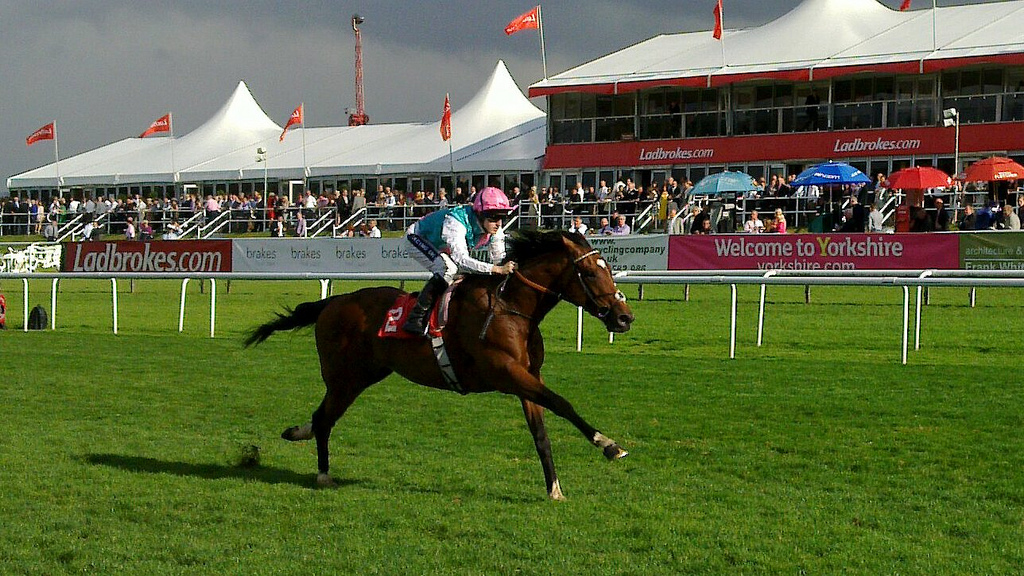
- Frankel winning the 2010 Frank Whittle
- Class: Listed
- Location: Doncaster Racecourse; Doncaster, England
- Race type: Flat / Thoroughbred
- Sponsor: Betfred
- Website: Doncaster

Race information
- Distance: 7f 6y (1,414 metres)
- Surface: Turf
- Track: Straight
- Qualification: Two-years-old
- Weight: 9 st 2 lb Allowances; 5 lb for fillies and mares Penalties; 7 lb for Group winners * 4 lb for Listed winners
- Purse: £65,000 (2025); 1st: £36,862

Flying Scotsman Stakes
2026
Forbidden Fire	Rock Montreal	Nabati

Previous years
2025
Avicenna	Hankelow	Sir Albert
2021
Noble Truth	Hoo Ya Mal	Gwan So
2020
New Mandate	Laneqash	One Ruler
2019
Molatham	Wichita	Berlin Tango
2018
Sangarius	Dubai Dominion	Pogo
2017
Tip Two Win	Tigre du Terre	Aqabah
2016
Rodaini	Salsabeel	Larchmont Lad
2015
Tashweeq	Haalick	Mohab
2014
Nafaqa	Toocoolforschool	Peacock
2013
Be Ready	Barley Mow	Voice of A Leader
2012
Ashdan	No Jet Lag	One Word More
2011
Ektihaam	Mizwaaj	Waseem Faris

2010-2001
2010
Frankel	Rainbow Springs	Diamond Geezah
2009
Al Zir	Treadwell	Practitioner
2008
Secrecy	Courageous	Yorksters Girl
2007
Newly Elected	Internationaldebut	Bazergan
2005
City of Troy	Art Deco	Ingleby Arch
2004
Librettist	Embossed	Camacho
2003
Sabbeeh	New Mexican	Mukafeh
2002
Maghanim	Magistretti	Pinkerton
2001
Hills of Gold	Mr Sandancer	Henri Lebasque

2000-1991
2000
Overspect	Tempest	Cafeteria Bay
1999
Tough Speed	Hataab	Launfal
1998
Desaru	Chief Rebel	Eltawaasul
1997
Teapot Row	Gulland	Mahboob
1996
Benny The Dip	Desert Story	Furnish
1995
Mawwal	Tria Kemata	Rocky Oasis
1994
Prussian Flag	Sonic Boy	Dahik
1993
Nicolotte	Pencader	Only two ran
1992
Tykeyvor	Great Steps	Wootton Rivers
1991
Ezzoud	Lead The Dance	Wilde Rufo

1990-1988
1990
Jahafil	Pfalz	Hamadryad
1989
Message Pad	Shavian	Mazag
1988
Shaadi	Magic Gleam	Gran Alba

The Flying Scotsman Stakes is a Listed flat horse race in Great Britain open to horses aged two years old. It is run at Doncaster Racecourse over a distance of 7 furlongs and 6 yards (1,408 metres), and it is scheduled to take place each year in September.

Prior to 2013 the race was known as the Frank Whittle Partnership Conditions Stakes, and amongst its earlier winners was Frankel in 2010. From 1983 to 1999 the race was known as the Queen's Own Yorkshire Dragoons Conditions Stakes. In 2013 it was upgraded to Listed status, replacing Goodwood's Stardom Stakes in the calendar and at the same time it was renamed the Flying Scotsman Stakes in honour of the LNER Class A3 4472 Flying Scotsman, a locomotive which was built at Doncaster Works 90 years previously in 1923. The race is currently held on the second day of Doncaster's four-day St. Leger Festival meeting.

== Records ==
Leading jockey (5 wins):

- Frankie Dettori – Prussian Flag (1994), Benny The Dip (1996), Librettist (2004), Al Zir (2009), New Mandate (2020)

Leading trainer (6 wins):

- Sir Michael Stoute – Cock Robin (1982), Shaadi (1988), Ezzoud (1991), Tough Speed (1999), City of Troy (2005), Sangarius (2018)

== Winners ==
Year	Winner	Jockey	Trainer	Time
1982	Cock Robin	Lester Piggott	Michael Stoute	1:29.76
1983	Seismic Wave	Steve Cauthen	Barry Hills	1:27.57
1984	Assemblyman	Pat Eddery	Geoff Wragg	1:29.53
1985	Janiski	Willie Carson	Dick Hern	1:27.09
1986	Brentano	Rae Guest	Luca Cumani	1:27.20
1987	Vaguely Hidden	Pat Eddery	Olivier Douieb	1:28.21
1988	Shaadi	Walter Swinburn	Michael Stoute	1:26.74
1989	Message Pad	Dean McKeown	Bill Watts	1:28.00
1990	Jahafil	Willie Carson	Dick Hern	1:28.25
1991	Ezzoud	Pat Eddery	Michael Stoute	1:24.48
1992	Tykeyvor	Philip Robinson	Mark Tompkins	1:30.55
1993	Nicolotte	Michael Hills	Geoff Wragg	1:29.44
1994	Prussian Flag	Frankie Dettori	Richard Hannon Sr.	1:27.05
1995	Mawwal	Willie Carson	Robert Armstrong	1:27.35
1996	Benny The Dip	Frankie Dettori	John Gosden	1:26.52
1997	Teapot Row	Michael Roberts	James Toller	1:25.04
1998	Desaru	Kieren Fallon	Jeremy Noseda	1:27.10
1999	Tough Speed	Kieren Fallon	Sir Michael Stoute	1:27.09
2000	Overspect	Jimmy Fortune	Paul Cole	1:27.62
2001	Hills of Gold	Michael Hills	Barry Hills	1:26.57
2002	Maghanim	Richard Hills	John Dunlop	1:25.37
2003	Sabbeeh	Philip Robinson	Michael Jarvis	1:28.51
2004	Librettist	Frankie Dettori	Saeed bin Suroor	1:22.61
2005	City of Troy	Kieren Fallon	Sir Michael Stoute	1:26.89
	no race 2006 (Note: Doncaster Racecourse closed for redevelopment)
2007	Newly Elected	Johnny Murtagh	Clive Cox	1:26.80
2008	Secrecy	Philip Robinson	Michael Jarvis	1:29.26
2009	Al Zir	Frankie Dettori	Saeed bin Suroor	1:25.27
2010	Frankel	Tom Queally	Henry Cecil	1:24.83
2011	Ektihaam	Richard Hills	Roger Varian	1:26.66
2012	Ashdan	William Buick	John Gosden	1:27.60
2013	Be Ready	Silvestre de Sousa	Saeed bin Suroor	1:28.76
2014	Nafaqa	Paul Hanagan	Barry Hills	1:23.38
2015	Tashweeq	Paul Hanagan	John Gosden	1:25.04
2016	Rodaini	Silvestre de Sousa	Simon Crisford	1:27.49
2017	Tip Two Win	Adam Kirby	Roger Teal	1:25.58
2018	Sangarius	Ryan Moore	Sir Michael Stoute	1:26.55
2019	Molatham	Jim Crowley	Roger Varian	1:25.35
2020	New Mandate	Frankie Dettori	Ralph Beckett	1:24.35
2021	Noble Truth	William Buick	Charlie Appleby	1:25.67
2023	Dancing Gemini	Lewis Edmunds	Roger Teal	1:25.96
2024	Benevento	David Egan	Raphael E Freire	1:24.89
2025	Avicenna	William Buick	Roger Varian	1:25.98
2026	Forbidden Fire	Oisin Murphy	Andrew Balding	1:24.90

== See also ==
- Horse racing in Great Britain
- List of British flat horse races
