= Super Tassa =

Irish-bred Thoroughbred racehorse

- Sire: Lahib
- Grandsire: Riverman
- Dam: Center Moriches
- Damsire: Magical Wonder
- Sex: Mare
- Foaled: 10 February 1996
- Country: Ireland
- Colour: Chestnut
- Breeder: Percy Banahan
- Owner: Valfredo Valiani
- Trainer: Valfredo Valiani
- Record: 23: 7-5-3
- Earnings: £369,643

Major wins
- Premio Baggio (1999); Prix Corrida (2000); Premio Carlo d'Alessio (2001); Yorkshire Oaks (2001)

Super Tassa (foaled 10 February 1996) is an Irish-bred, Italian-trained Thoroughbred racehorse and broodmare best known for her upset win in the 2001 Yorkshire Oaks. Bred by Percy Banahan in County Meath was sold cheaply as a yearling and exported to race in Italy. After winning two minor races as a juvenile, she added a win in the Listed Premio Baggio in 1999 but finished last in her only race outside Italy. As a four-year-old she won two of her six races including her first Group race success in the Prix Corrida in Paris. She reached her peak in 2001 when she won the Premio Carlo d'Alessio in Rome and ended her racing career by winning the Yorkshire Oaks in England at odds of 25/1. She was retired from racing shortly afterwards and has had modest success as a dam of winners.

== Background ==
Super Tassa is a chestnut mare with a white star and two white socks bred at the Moortown House Stud in County Meath Ireland by Percy Banahan. She was one of the best horses sired by Lahib who won the Queen Anne Stakes and the Queen Elizabeth II Stakes in 1991. Lahib's other progeny included Vicious Circle (Ebor Handicap), Last Resort (Challenge Stakes), Late Night Out (Supreme Stakes) and Mus-If (National Stakes). Super Tassa's dam Center Moriches was a moderate racehorse who won one minor race from ten attempts. Apart from Super Tassa she produced Mr Ed who won five flat races and seven under National Hunt rules.

As a yearling she was sent to the Tattersalls Ireland sale in September 1997 and was bought for 1,800 guineas by the bloodstock agency BBA (Italy). She was sent to Italy where she was trained by Valfredo Valiani near Pisa, formerly an assistant to Luca Cumani. The filly raced throughout her career in the official ownership of Valiani although a majority share was sold to the art dealer Cyril Humphris after her second run.

== Racing career ==
=== 1998: two-year-old season ===
Super Tassa began her racing career by winning a maiden race over 1300 metres at Florence on 12 September 1998 and followed up two weeks later in a race over 1600 metres at San Siro Racecourse in Milan. On 11 October she was moved up in class for the Group Three Premio Dormello over the same course and distance and finished second of the eleven runners behind the British-trained Barafamy.

=== 1999: three-year-old season ===
Super Tassa began her second season in Italy, running second on her debut and finishing unplaced behind Shenck in the Premio Regina Elena at the Capannelle Racecourse in Rome before winning the Listed Premio Baggio over 2000 metres in Milan on 8 May. She was then sent to France for the Group Three Prix Chloé at Chantilly Racecourse in July and finished last of the four runners. On her return to Italy in the autumn she was twice unplaced before finishing second in a handicap race at Turin in November.

=== 2000: four-year-old season ===
Super Tassa finished fourth on her four-year-old debut and then won a handicap over 2000 metres at Milan. She was then sent to France again and started a 12.1/1 outsider in a five-runner field for the Group Three Prix Corrida over 2100 metres at Saint-Cloud Racecourse on 18 May. Ridden by Thierry Thulliez she raced in fourth place before taking the lead 200 metres out and held off the challenge of the odds-on favourite War Game by half a length. At Milan in June she finished third behind the British filly Sailing and the German-trained Dangerous Mind in the Premio Mario Incisa. In the autumn of 2000 she finished unplaced behind Mouramara in the Prix de Royallieu Longchamp Racecourse and was then moved up to Group One level for the Gran Premio del Jockey Club in October in which she finished eighth of the ten runners behind Golden Snake.

=== 2001: five-year-old season ===
By 2001 Super Tassa had developed back problems and received regular acupuncture treatment. In the spring she finished second in the Prix Noale over 2400 metres and a handicap race over 2000 metres at Milan. On 27 May at Capannelle on good to firm ground, the filly started the 16.6/1 outsider for the Group Two Premio Carlo d'Alessio over 2800 metres. Ridden as in several of her previous races by Palmerio Agus she was restrained in the early stages and was still last of the eight runners 400 metres from the finish. She made rapid progress on the outside in the closing stages, took the lead in the final strides and won by a neck from the gelding London Bank, with the German colt King's Boy a neck away in third. In the Group One Gran Premio di Milano on 17 June, Super Tassa started at odds of 8.6/1 and stayed on strongly in the closing stages to finish third behind Paolini (later to win the Dubai Duty Free Stakes), and the British-trained favourite Ela Athena. The mare then moved to France for her next two races, finishing sixth to Mirio in the Grand Prix de Saint-Cloud and third behind Abitara and Head In The Clouds in the Prix de Pomone at Deauvillle on 5 August.

Super Tassa was sent to England for the first and only time when she was one of nine fillies and mares to contest the Group One Yorkshire Oaks on 22 August and was partnered by the British jockey Kevin Darley. The Lancashire Oaks winner Sacred Song started favourite ahead of the Irish Oaks runner-up Mot Juste with Super Tassa starting the 25/1 outsider in a nine-runner field. The other runners were Head In The Clouds, Karsavina (third in the Irish Oaks), Snowflake (second in the Nassau Stakes), Zanzibar (Oaks d'Italia), Nafisa (Ballymacoll Stud Stakes) and Rockerlong (Cheshire Oaks). Super Tassa was held up by Darley in the early stages as first Mot Juste and then Snowflake set the pace before the Italian mare began to move forward half a mile from the finish. Sacred Song took the lead in the straight but Super Tassa went to the front approaching the final furlong and held on to win by a length from the favourite, with Rockerlong two and a half lengths back in third place. She was the first Italian-trained horse to win a major race in Britain since Marguerite Vernaut won the Champion Stakes in 1960. After the race Valiani said: "The plan was always to come here after she won a Group 2 in Italy in April. York was the perfect track for her. She likes a strong pace and a long straight. She did work very well on Friday, so we were quite confident. I was worried because she got a bit upset beforehand and sometimes she can be a hard ride. But Kevin Darley was very good. Cyril chose him and said he was a mature jockey who knew York very well. We thought about retiring her to stud and I think she deserved it.

Eight days after her win at York it was announced that the mare would be retired from racing. Valiani said "Super Tassa is worth a lot of money now and there have been a few offers for her, but Mr Humphris wants to keep her and breed from her. She has been retired and we're very happy".

== Breeding record ==
Super Tassa was retired from racing to become a broodmare. In 2007 she was sent to the December Mares Sale at Tattersalls and was bought for 52,000 guineas by the Italian breeding company Rosati Colarieti. She has produced at least five foals and two winners:

- La Mont, a chestnut colt, foaled in 2003, sired by Halling
- Maunder Not, bay filly, 2004, by Hernando
- Covert Ambition, chestnut colt, 2005, by Singspiel. Won two races.
- Rysbrack, chestnut colt (later gelded), 2006, by Selkirk. Won two races.
- Roubiliac, chestnut colt, 2007, by Rahy. Failed to win in two races.

== Pedigree ==
Pedigree of Super Tassa (IRE), chestnut mare, 1996
Sire Lahib (USA) 1988	Riverman (USA); 1969	Never Bend	Nasrullah
Sire Lahib (USA) 1988	Riverman (USA); 1969	Never Bend	Lalun
Sire Lahib (USA) 1988	Riverman (USA); 1969	River Lady	Prince John
Sire Lahib (USA) 1988	Riverman (USA); 1969	River Lady	Nile Lily
Sire Lahib (USA) 1988	Lady Cutlass (USA); 1978	Cutlass	Damascus
Sire Lahib (USA) 1988	Lady Cutlass (USA); 1978	Cutlass	Aphonia
Sire Lahib (USA) 1988	Lady Cutlass (USA); 1978	General's Sister	Count Fleet
Sire Lahib (USA) 1988	Lady Cutlass (USA); 1978	General's Sister	Cigar Maid
Dam Center Moriches (IRE) 1990	Magical Wonder (USA); 1983	Storm Bird	Northern Dancer
Dam Center Moriches (IRE) 1990	Magical Wonder (USA); 1983	Storm Bird	South Ocean
Dam Center Moriches (IRE) 1990	Magical Wonder (USA); 1983	Flama Ardiente	Crimson Satan
Dam Center Moriches (IRE) 1990	Magical Wonder (USA); 1983	Flama Ardiente	Royal Rafale
Dam Center Moriches (IRE) 1990	Tumble Royal (IRE); 1977	Tumble Wind	Restless Wind
Dam Center Moriches (IRE) 1990	Tumble Royal (IRE); 1977	Tumble Wind	Easy Stages
Dam Center Moriches (IRE) 1990	Tumble Royal (IRE); 1977	Royal Nell	King's Leap
Dam Center Moriches (IRE) 1990	Tumble Royal (IRE); 1977	Royal Nell	Nonstopnell (Family: 4-c)
