= Stardom Stakes =

Stardom Stakes (Peter Willett Stakes)
- Class: Conditions
- Location: Goodwood Racecourse; W. Sussex, England
- Inaugurated: 1978
- Race type: Flat / Thoroughbred
- Website: Goodwood

Race information
- Distance: 7f (1,408 metres)
- Surface: Turf
- Track: Right-handed
- Qualification: Two-year-olds
- Weight: 9 st 0 lb Allowances; 5 lb for fillies Penalties; 7 lb for Group winners 4 lb for Listed winners
- Purse: £25,000 (2012); 1st: £14,177.50

Stardom Stakes
2016
Seven Heavens	Shabeeh	Only two ran

Previous years
2015
Palawan	Essenaitch	Bobby Wheeler
2014
Make It Up	Good Contact	Johnny Barnes
2013
Lyn Valley	Rosso Corsa	Wahaab
2012
Steeler	Tamayuz Star	Sorella Bella
2011
Bronterre	Justineo	Nayarra
2010
Titus Mills	Big Issue	Surrey Star
2009
Vale Of York	Mata Keranjang	Atlantis Star
2008
Zafisio	Anmar	Measurement
2007
Meeriss	Eastern Gift	Dauberval
2006
Caldra	Big Robert	Norisan
2005
True Cause	Leo	Private Business
2004
Hearthstead Wings	Destinate	Capable Guest
2003
Fantastic View	Mutahayya	Top Seed

The Stardom Stakes, also known as the Peter Willett Stakes, was a conditions flat horse race in Great Britain open to two-year-old thoroughbreds. It was run at Goodwood over a distance of 7 furlongs (1,408 metres), and took place each year in late August or early September.

== History ==
The event was established in 1978, and it was initially called the Westhampnett Stakes. It was named after Westhampnett, a village to the south of Goodwood. It became known as the Chromacopy Stakes in 1983.

The race was given Listed status and renamed the Stardom Stakes in 1987. Its original distance of 1 mile was cut to 7 furlongs in 2009 and it was renamed the Peter Willett Stakes in recognition of a long-serving director of Goodwood Racecourse. The race lost its Listed status in 2013, being replaced in the calendar by the Flying Scotsman Stakes at Doncaster.

The race was replaced by a valuable sire-restricted Maiden (Peter Willett Maiden Stakes), run over 1 mile, in 2017.

== Records ==
Leading jockey (2 wins):

- Pat Dobbs – Fantastic View (2003), Bronterre (2011), Palawan (2015)

Leading trainer (4 wins):

- Henry Cecil – Clear Verdict (1980), Royal Coach (1984), Mashkour (1985), Zalazl (1988)
- Richard Hannon Sr. - Innishowen (1993), Fantastic View (2003), Bronterre (2011), Palawan (2015)

== Winners ==
Year	Winner	Jockey	Trainer	Time
1978	Bonnie Isle	Willie Carson	John Dunlop	1:40.66
1979 (Note: The 1979 running took place at Sandown Park)	Morayshire	Kipper Lynch	Bruce Hobbs	1:47.34
1980	Clear Verdict	Joe Mercer	Henry Cecil	1:44.96
1981	Jalmood	Pat Eddery	John Dunlop	1:43.23
1982	Lofty	Paul Cook	Harry Thomson Jones	1:41.24
1983	Gambler's Cup	Tony Clark	Guy Harwood	1:45.14
1984	Royal Coach	Paul Eddery	Henry Cecil	1:42.71
1985	Mashkour	Paul Eddery	Henry Cecil	1:44.11
1986	Beeshi	Philip Waldron	Paul Cole	1:44.38
1987	Church Lyric	Greville Starkey	Guy Harwood	1:48.44
1988	Zalazl	Michael Roberts	Henry Cecil	1:43.70
1989	Champagne Gold	Bruce Raymond	Denys Smith	1:46.48
1990	Selkirk	John Reid	Ian Balding	1:38.56
1991	Seattle Rhyme	Pat Eddery	David Elsworth	1:39.44
1992	Blush Rambler	Cash Asmussen	Michael Stoute	1:43.55
1993	Innishowen	Richard Quinn	Richard Hannon, Sr.	1:43.62
1994	Fahal	Ray Cochrane	David Morley	1:41.80
1995	Bonarelli	Walter Swinburn	Michael Stoute	1:41.83
1996	Falkenham	Richard Quinn	Paul Cole	1:39.83
1997	Alboostan	Gary Carter	David Morley	1:41.74
1998	Mutaahab	Gary Carter	Ed Dunlop	1:44.70
1999	Sarafan	George Duffield	Sir Mark Prescott	1:39.39
2000	Atlantis Prince	Olivier Peslier	Sean Woods	1:41.46
2001	Henri Lebasque	Jimmy Fortune	Paul Cole	1:39.13
2002	Rimrod	Martin Dwyer	Ian Balding	1:38.18
2003	Fantastic View	Pat Dobbs	Richard Hannon, Sr.	1:38.41
2004	Hearthstead Wings	Joe Fanning	Mark Johnston	1:41.26
2005	True Cause	Kerrin McEvoy	Saeed bin Suroor	1:38.81
2006	Caldra	George Baker	Sylvester Kirk	1:37.21
2007	Meeriss	Darryll Holland	Mick Channon	1:42.58
2008	Zafisio	Darryll Holland	Paul Blockley	1:46.32
2009	Vale of York	Ahmed Ajtebi	Saeed bin Suroor	1:26.77
2010	Titus Mills	Martin Dwyer	Brian Meehan	1:29.36
2011	Bronterre	Pat Dobbs	Richard Hannon, Sr.	1:28.94
2012	Steeler	Kieren Fallon	Mark Johnston	1:26.10
2013	Lyn Valley	Joe Fanning	Mark Johnston	1:25.65
2014	Make It Up	David Probert	Andrew Balding	1:27.38
2015	Palawan	Pat Dobbs	Richard Hannon, Sr.	1:31.04
2016	Seven Heavens	Robert Havlin	John Gosden	1:26.73

== See also ==
- Horse racing in Great Britain
- List of British flat horse races
- Recurring sporting events established in 1978 – this race is included under its original title, Westhampnett Stakes.
