= Hamas (horse) =

Irish-bred Thoroughbred racehorse

- Sire: Danzig
- Grandsire: Northern Dancer
- Dam: Fall Aspen
- Damsire: Pretense
- Sex: Stallion
- Foaled: 28 April 1989
- Country: Ireland
- Colour: Dark Bay or Brown
- Breeder: Hullin Co N V (international)
- Owner: Hamdan Al Maktoum
- Trainer: Peter Walwyn
- Record: 18: 5-4-1
- Earnings: £151,894

Major wins
- Bentinck Stakes (1992); Duke of York Stakes (1993); July Cup (1993)

Hamas (foaled 28 April 1989) was an Irish-bred, British-trained Thoroughbred racehorse and sire. Unraced as a two-year-old he won three of his eleven races in 1992 including the Bentinck Stakes, but appeared to be well below top class and was used as a pacemaker for a more fancied horse in the same ownership on his only run in Group One class. As a four-year-old, he won the Group Three Duke of York Stakes but was well beaten in his next two races before recording a 33/1 upset win in the July Cup. He finished last in both of his subsequent races and was retired at the end of the year. He had limited success as a breeding stallion.

== Background ==
Hamas was a dark bay or brown horse with no white markings bred in Ireland by Hullin Co N V (international). His sire Danzig, who ran only three times before his career was ended by injury, was a highly successful stallion who sired the winners of more than fifty Grade I/Group One races. His offspring include the champions Chief's Crown, Dayjur and Lure as well as the important stallion Danehill. Hamas's dam Fall Aspen was an outstanding broodmare whose other descendants have included Timber Country, Dubai Millennium and Elnadim.

Hamas entered the ownership of Hamdan Al Maktoum and was sent into training with Peter Walwyn at Lambourn. He was ridden in all but three of his races by Willie Carson. The Arabic word 'Hamas' (حماس) means "enthusiasm" or "zeal".

== Racing career ==
=== 1992: three-year-old season ===
Hamas was unraced as a two-year-old and began his racing career by finishing second in the Granby Maiden Stakes over seven furlongs at Newmarket Racecourse on 16 April. He recorded his first success when winning over one mile at Sandown Park Racecourse eight days later and then finished second to Ezzoud (also owned by Hamdan Al Maktoum) over the same course and distance on 5 May. Later that month he was dropped back to seven furlongs and won a minor event at Chepstow Racecourse at odds of 2/5. In June he was moved up in class for the Group Three Jersey Stakes at Royal Ascot and finished unplaced behind Prince Ferdinand. He then finished second in the Monk's Cross Stakes at York, fourth in the Beeswing Stakes at Newcastle, second in the Hopeful Stakes at Newmarket and third in the Arlington Stakes at Newbury.

On 26 September Hamas was used as a pacemaker for Hamdan Al Maktoum's horse Lahib in the Queen Elizabeth II Stakes at Ascot and led into the straight before finishing last of the nine runners. On his final appearance of the year he started a 16/1 outsider for the Listed Bentinck Stakes over five furlongs at Newmarket on 17 October. He was ridden close to the lead by Carson before taking the lead a quarter of a mile from the finish. He ran on well in the closing stages to win by two and a half lengths from Blyton Lad.

=== 1993: four-year-old season ===
Hamas began his second season by finishing sixth behind Splice in the Abernant Stakes over six furlongs at Newmarket on 13 April. A month later at York the colt started a 14/1 outsider for the Duke of York Stakes. The European Free Handicap winner So Factual started favourite ahead of the mare Lochsong, whilst the other runners included Blyton Lad, Montendre (Hackwood Stakes), Son Pardo (Richmond Stakes) and Regal Chimes (Cammidge Trophy). Carson tracked the leaders before making a forward move in the last quarter mile. Hamas took the lead inside the final furlong and won by half a length from the Henry Cecil-trained filly Garah. Hamas failed to reproduce his York form in his next two races, finishing eighth behind Paris House in the Temple Stakes at Sandown and unplaced behind College Chapel in the Cork and Orrery Stakes at Royal Ascot.

On 8 July, Hamas started a 33/1 outsider for the Group One July Cup at Newmarket. Peter Walwyn had not been too optimistic before the race, instructing Carson to "keep going and try to pick up a few". College Chapel started favourite ahead of Elbio (King's Stand Stakes), Zieten (Middle Park Stakes) and Keen Hunter, whilst the other runners included Basim (Anglesey Stakes), Marina Park (Princess Margaret Stakes), Silver Wizard (Sirenia Stakes), Fylde Flyer (Cammidge Trophy, Abernant Stakes) and Freddie Lloyd (Ballyogan Stakes, King George Stakes). In a change of tactics, Carson sent Hamas to the front after two furlongs and the colt maintained his advantage throughout. He went clear of the field a furlong out and drew away to win by three lengths from College Chapel, with Zieten taking third ahead of Keen Hunter. Walwyn who had been without a major winner for several years said: "If you do the right things, keep plugging away and have the right people working for you, it comes back". When asked how he had responded in an inquiry into the colt's improved performance he added "I told them I'm only going to say one thing: that the only thing that makes more fool of a man than a horse is a woman". Carson explained that he had persuaded Hamdan Al Maktoum to keep the horse in training saying "when he was going seven furlongs and a mile last year I wasn't sure it was his right trip. I had the idea that with him being by Danzig I should ride him like Dayjur. He's not dissimilar in that you have to let him run. If you take a tug he's gone"

Hamas ran poorly on his two subsequent starts, finishing last on both occasions. He finished seventh behind Wolfhound in the Haydock Sprint Cup in September, and ninth behind Catrail in the Diadem Stakes at Ascot in October.

== Stud record ==
Hamas was retired from racing to become a breeding stallion at his owner's Derrinstown Stud in County Kildare. He was also "shuttled" to the Glenlogan Park Stud in Queensland, Australia for the southern hemisphere breeding season. He stood at the Haras des Chartreux in France in 2004 before moving to the Pitchall Farm Stud in Warwickshire in the following year. The best of his offspring was Mitcham who won the King's Stand Stakes in 1999.

== Pedigree ==
Pedigree of Hamas (IRE), bay or brown stallion, 1989
Sire Danzig (USA) 1977	Northern Dancer (CAN); 1961	Nearctic	Nearco
Sire Danzig (USA) 1977	Northern Dancer (CAN); 1961	Nearctic	Lady Angela
Sire Danzig (USA) 1977	Northern Dancer (CAN); 1961	Natalma	Native Dancer
Sire Danzig (USA) 1977	Northern Dancer (CAN); 1961	Natalma	Almahmoud
Sire Danzig (USA) 1977	Pas de Nom (USA); 1968	Admiral's Voyage	Crafty Admiral
Sire Danzig (USA) 1977	Pas de Nom (USA); 1968	Admiral's Voyage	Olympia Lou
Sire Danzig (USA) 1977	Pas de Nom (USA); 1968	Petitioner	Petition
Sire Danzig (USA) 1977	Pas de Nom (USA); 1968	Petitioner	Steady Aim
Dam Fall Aspen (USA) 1976	Pretense (USA); 1963	Endeavour	British Empire
Dam Fall Aspen (USA) 1976	Pretense (USA); 1963	Endeavour	Himalaya
Dam Fall Aspen (USA) 1976	Pretense (USA); 1963	Imitation	Hyperion
Dam Fall Aspen (USA) 1976	Pretense (USA); 1963	Imitation	Flattery
Dam Fall Aspen (USA) 1976	Change Water (USA); 1969	Swaps	Khaled
Dam Fall Aspen (USA) 1976	Change Water (USA); 1969	Swaps	Iron Reward
Dam Fall Aspen (USA) 1976	Change Water (USA); 1969	Portage	War Admiral
Dam Fall Aspen (USA) 1976	Change Water (USA); 1969	Portage	Carillon (Family: 4-m)
