= Hatoof =

American-bred Thoroughbred racehorse

- Sire: Irish River
- Grandsire: Riverman
- Dam: Cadeaux d'Amie
- Damsire: Lyphard
- Sex: Filly
- Foaled: 1989
- Country: USA
- Colour: Chestnut
- Breeder: Gainsborough Farm
- Owner: Maktoum bin Rashid Al Maktoum
- Trainer: Criquette Head
- Record: 21: 9-4-1
- Earnings: $1,841,063

Major wins
- 1,000 Guineas (1992); E. P. Taylor Stakes (1992); Prix de l'Opéra (1992); Champion Stakes (1993); La Coupe de Maisons-Laffitte (1993); Prix du Muguet (1993); Beverly D. Stakes (1994); Prix d'Astarté (1994)

Awards
- U.S. Champion Female Turf Horse (1994)
- Last updated on October 26, 2006

Hatoof (born January 26, 1989, in Versailles, Kentucky) is a Thoroughbred Champion racehorse who competed internationally out of a base in Chantilly, France, under trainer Criquette Head for owner Sheikh Maktoum bin Rashid Al Maktoum. Racing at age 2 in France, Hatoof started three times, winning once and placing second on two occasions. The filly went on to great success during the next three years, winning major stakes races in the United Kingdom, Canada, and the United States. She was Champion in France in 1991 and 1993 and was voted the 1994 U.S. Eclipse Award for Outstanding Female Turf Horse.

Retired at the end of the 1994 racing season after finishing second to Tikkanen in the Breeders' Cup Turf, Hatoof later served as a broodmare for Gainsborough Stud Management Ltd. of Newbury, Berkshire. In January 2025, she turns 36 at Darley's Gainsborough Farms.

== Breeding record ==
1996 Prospects of Glory (USA) : Bay colt (1st foal), foaled 24 January, by Mr Prospector (USA) - won 1 race and placed 3 times from 10 starts in Dubai, Britain and Italy 2002–3

1998 Mighty Isis (USA) : Bay filly, foaled 1 January, by Pleasant Colony (USA) - won 1 race; 3rd LR Prix de Thiberville, Deauville from 9 starts in France 2000–01

1999 Dubai Edition (USA) : Chestnut colt, foaled 1 January, by Mr Prospector (USA) - won 2 races and placed once in the United States and Dubai 2001–03

2004 Bochinche (USA) : Bay filly, foaled 23 January, by Kingmambo (USA) - unplaced in 2 starts in England 2007

2006 Loulou (USA) : Chestnut filly (7th foal), foaled 12 March, by El Prado (IRE) - won 1 race and placed once from 7 starts in England 2008-9
