= Rodrigo de Triano =

American-bred Thoroughbred racehorse (1989–2014)

- Racing silks of Robert Sangster
- Sire: El Gran Senor
- Grandsire: Northern Dancer
- Dam: Hot Princess
- Damsire: Hot Spark
- Sex: Stallion
- Foaled: 1989
- Country: Great Britain
- Colour: Chestnut
- Breeder: Swettenham Stud
- Owner: Robert Sangster
- Trainer: Peter Chapple-Hyam
- Record: 13: 9-0-0
- Earnings: £760,101

Major wins
- Franklin D. Roosevelt Maiden Stakes (1991); Rose Bowl Stakes (1991); Washington Singer Stakes (1991); Champagne Stakes (1991); Middle Park Stakes (1991); 2000 Guineas Stakes (1992); Irish 2,000 Guineas (1992); International Stakes (1992); Champion Stakes (1992)

Awards
- European Champion Three-Year-Old Colt (1992); Timeform rating: 130
- Last updated on 3 November 2023

Rodrigo de Triano (foaled 27 May 1989 – 5 August 2014) was an American-bred, English-trained Thoroughbred Champion racehorse.

== Background ==
Foaled in Kentucky, and bred and raced by leading British horseman, Robert Sangster, he was out of the mare Hot Princess and sired by El Gran Senor, a sire of fifty-five stakes race winners. He was trained by Peter Chapple-Hyam at Manton, Wiltshire.

== Racing career ==
Rodrigo de Triano made his debut on 4 July 1991 with a win in the Franklin D. Roosevelt Maiden Stakes at Haydock Park Racecourse. He went on to win his next four starts, capping off his undefeated season with a win in the Group 1 Middle Park Stakes at Newmarket Racecourse on 3 October.

As a three-year-old, Rodrigo de Triano made eight starts. He debuted on 11 April 1992 in the Greenham Stakes at Newbury Racecourse, finishing fourth. He then came back to win two Classics, the 2000 Guineas Stakes at Newmarket and the Irish 2,000 Guineas at the Curragh ridden by Lester Piggott. In The Derby he ran ninth to winner Dr. Devious followed by a fourth-place finish to Brief Truce in the St. James's Palace Stakes at Ascot Racecourse. Given two months off, on 18 August at York Racecourse, Rodrigo de Triano and Piggott returned to top form, defeating Dr. Devious while winning the International Stakes. He next won the Champion Stakes at Newmarket on 17 October defeating Lahib by a neck and then a week later was sold for US$6.2 million to the Japan Racing Association. His new owners sent him to the United States to compete in the US$3 million Breeders' Cup Classic on 31 October, hosted that year by Gulfstream Park in Hallandale Beach, Florida. Racing on dirt for the first time, and starting from post position eleven in a fourteen horse field, Rodrigo de Triano was never in contention and finished last behind winner A.P. Indy in the final race of his career. He was ridden by Walter Swinburn as Lester Piggott had been injured earlier in the afternoon in a fall from Mr Brooks in the Breeders Cup Sprint. For his 1992 performances, Rodrigo de Triano was voted the Cartier Racing Award as the European Champion Three-Year-Old Colt.

== Stud record ==
Rodrigo de Triano was retired to stud duty in Japan beginning in 1993 and was shuttled to New Zealand for a time beginning in 1997. In 2009 he was standing at JBBA Kyushu Stallion Station in Kagoshima. He produced several winners of Conditions races in Japan including Group One winner, Erimo Excel. Rodrigo de Triano died of pneumonia in 2014 at the age of 25.

== Pedigree ==
Pedigree of Rodrigo de Triano
| Sire El Gran Senor (USA) 1981 | Northern Dancer (CAN); 1961 | Nearctic | Nearco |
| Sire El Gran Senor (USA) 1981 | Northern Dancer (CAN); 1961 | Nearctic | Lady Angela |
| Sire El Gran Senor (USA) 1981 | Northern Dancer (CAN); 1961 | Natalma | Native Dancer |
| Sire El Gran Senor (USA) 1981 | Northern Dancer (CAN); 1961 | Natalma | Almahmoud |
| Sire El Gran Senor (USA) 1981 | Sex Appeal (USA); 1970 | Buckpasser | Tom Fool |
| Sire El Gran Senor (USA) 1981 | Sex Appeal (USA); 1970 | Buckpasser | Busanda |
| Sire El Gran Senor (USA) 1981 | Sex Appeal (USA); 1970 | Best In Show | Traffic Judge |
| Sire El Gran Senor (USA) 1981 | Sex Appeal (USA); 1970 | Best In Show | Stolen Hour |
| Dam Hot Princess (GB) 1980 | Hot Spark (IRE); 1972 | Habitat | Sir Gaylord |
| Dam Hot Princess (GB) 1980 | Hot Spark (IRE); 1972 | Habitat | Little Hut |
| Dam Hot Princess (GB) 1980 | Hot Spark (IRE); 1972 | Garvey Girl | Princely Gift |
| Dam Hot Princess (GB) 1980 | Hot Spark (IRE); 1972 | Garvey Girl | Tekka |
| Dam Hot Princess (GB) 1980 | Aspara (USA); 1972 | Crimson Satan | Spy Song |
| Dam Hot Princess (GB) 1980 | Aspara (USA); 1972 | Crimson Satan | Papila |
| Dam Hot Princess (GB) 1980 | Aspara (USA); 1972 | Courtside | Court Martial |
| Dam Hot Princess (GB) 1980 | Aspara (USA); 1972 | Courtside | Omelet Souffle |
