= Irish River =

French-bred Thoroughbred racehorse

- Sire: Riverman
- Grandsire: Never Bend
- Dam: Irish Star
- Damsire: Klairon
- Sex: Stallion
- Foaled: 1976
- Country: France
- Colour: Chestnut
- Breeder: Mrs. Raymond Ades
- Owner: Mrs. Raymond Ades
- Trainer: John Cunnington, Jr.
- Record: 12: 10-0-1
- Earnings: US$622,739 (equivalent)

Major wins
- Prix du Bois (1978); Prix Morny (1978); Prix de la Salamandre (1978); Grand Critérium (1978); Prix de Fontainebleau (1979); Poule d'Essai des Poulains (1979); Prix d'Ispahan (1979); Prix Jacques Le Marois (1979); Prix du Moulin de Longchamp (1979)
- Last updated on August 11, 2007

Irish River (April 2, 1976 – April 25, 2004) was a French Thoroughbred racehorse who won seven Group One races in France during his two-years of racing.

== Background ==
Bred and raced by Mrs. Raymond Ades, he was out of the mare Irish Star. His sire was the influential Riverman, a grandson of the extremely important stallion, Nearco. He was trained by John Cunnington, Jr.

== Racing career ==
Racing at age two in 1978, Irish River made six starts. After winning his first two races, the colt finished fourth in the July 30th Group Two Prix Robert Papin to winner Pitasia. However, three weeks later he defeated Pitasia in capturing the Group One Prix Morny. At the end of the year he won his fifth race, the prestigious Grand Critérium.

In the 1979 season, three-year-old Irish River duplicated his previous year's record by again winning five of his six starts. His only loss was a third-place finish in the Prix Lupin. Irish River ended his career as a winner of seven Group One races.

== Stud record ==
At the end of his racing career Entered stud in 1980 at Haras du Quesnay in Calvados. He was acquired by John R. Gaines who brought him to stand at stud in 1981–2001 at his Gainesway Farm in Lexington, Kentucky where his influential sire Riverman had stood.

Irish River had a successful twenty-two-year career as a stallion. Due to declining fertility, he was pensioned in 2001 having sired 87 stakes winners including:

- Or Vision (1983) - multiple stakes winning Filly in France as well as a multiple stakes producer
- Hatoof (1989) - Champion in France in 1991 and 1993. Voted the 1994 United States Eclipse Award for Outstanding Female Turf Horse
- Paradise Creek (1989) - multiple Grade I winner in the U.S. and winner of the 1994 Eclipse Award for Outstanding Male Turf Horse
- Brief Truce (1989) - won Grade I St. James's Palace Stakes, earned 1992 European highweight honors
- River Bay (1993) - millionaire multiple stakes winner in France and the United States
- Natalie Too (1994) - 1997 Champion three-year-old filly in Peru
- Irish Prize (1996) - millionaire multiple stakes winner

Irish River is the damsire of notable runners such as:

- Arcangues (1988) - 1993 Breeders' Cup Classic winner
- Saffron Walden (1996) - won Group One Irish 2,000 Guineas
- David Junior (2002)- Eclipse Stakes, Champion Stakes, Dubai Duty Free

At age twenty-eight, Irish River died suddenly of a massive heart attack on April 25, 2004, at Gainesway Farm.
