= 1982 in sports =

1982 in sports describes the year's events in world sport.

== Alpine skiing ==
- Alpine Skiing World Cup:
  - Men's overall season champion: Phil Mahre, United States
  - Women's overall season champion: Erika Hess, Switzerland

== American football ==
- Super Bowl XVI – the San Francisco 49ers (NFC) won 26–21 over the Cincinnati Bengals (AFC)
  - Location: Pontiac Silverdome
  - Attendance: 81,270
  - MVP: Joe Montana, QB (San Francisco)
- Orange Bowl (1981 season):
  - The Clemson Tigers won 22-15 over the Nebraska Cornhuskers to win the college football national championship
- Strike – First regular season strike by NFL players ends on November 16 after 57 days.

== Association football ==
- World Cup in Spain – Italy beats West Germany 3-1 for their third title.
- Champions' Cup – Aston Villa 1-0 Bayern München
- UEFA Cup – Two legs; 1st leg IFK Göteborg 1-0 Hamburger SV; 2nd leg Hamburger SV 0-3 IFK Göteborg. IFK Göteborg won 4-0 on aggregate. 66 fans died in the Luzhniki disaster during the UEFA Cup second round match between FC Spartak Moscow and HFC Haarlem in Moscow on 20 October.
- Cup Winners' Cup – Barcelona 2-1 Standard Liège
- Super Cup – Two legs; 1st leg Barcelona 1-0 Aston Villa; 2nd leg Aston Villa 3-0 Barcelona. Aston Villa won 3-1 on aggregate
- Copa Libertadores de América – Two legs; 1st leg Peñarol 0-0 Cobreloa; 2nd leg Cobreloa 0-1 Peñarol. Peñarol win 1-0 on aggregate
- England – FA Cup – Tottenham Hotspur won 1-0 over Queens Park Rangers

== Athletics ==
- September – 1982 European Athletics Championships held in Athens
- October – 1982 Commonwealth Games held in Brisbane, Australia
- December – 1982 Asian Games held in New Delhi, India

== Australian rules football ==
- Victorian Football League
  - Carlton wins the 86th VFL Premiership (Carlton 14.19 (103) d Richmond 12.13 (83))
  - Brownlow Medal awarded to Brian Wilson (Melbourne)
  - The inaugural VFL Players Association Most Valuable Player Award goes to Leigh Matthews (Hawthorn). The award would be renamed the Leigh Matthews Trophy in his honour in 2002.

== Baseball ==
- March 27 – KBO League, a professional baseball league in South Korea, a first officially game held.
- May 30 – Cal Ripken Jr. of the Baltimore Orioles plays the first of what will become a record-breaking 2,632 consecutive games
- July 13 – Montreal hosts the first MLB All-Star Game outside the United States. Reds SS Dave Concepción hits a two-run home run in the second inning to spark the National League to its 11th consecutive win over the American League 4-1. The NL has now won 19 of the last 20 contests. Concepción was named the MVP.
- August 18 – Pete Rose sets record with his 13,941st plate appearance.
- World Series – St. Louis Cardinals won four games to three over the Milwaukee Brewers to claim their first World Championship since 1967. The Series MVP was Cardinals catcher Darrell Porter.
- The Salem Angels won the Northwest League championship.

== Basketball ==
- NCAA Men's Basketball Championship –
  - North Carolina wins 63-62 over Georgetown
- NCAA Division I Women's Basketball Championship
  - Louisiana Tech wins 76–62 over Cheyney State
- NBA Finals –
  - Los Angeles Lakers won four games to two over the Philadelphia 76ers
- National Basketball League (Australia) Finals:
  - West Adelaide Bearcats defeated the Geelong Cats 80-74 in the final.
- FIBA World Championship
  - USSR World Champion

== Boxing ==
- May 4 to May 15 – 1982 World Amateur Boxing Championships held in Munich
- June 11 – Larry Holmes defeats Gerry Cooney for the WBC Heavyweight title. Cooney, a white challenger, was dubbed "The White Hope" in what built up to be a very racially toned fight.
- November 12 – Aaron Pryor defeats Alexis Argüello in what would later be called the fight of the decade. Pryor retained the WBA's world Jr. Welterweight title with a 14th round knockout
- November 13 – Ray Mancini defeats Duk Koo Kim by knockout in 14 rounds in a tragic fight. Kim died four days later and the fight's outcome brought many new resolutions to boxing.
- December 3 – The Carnival of Champions; Wilfredo Gomez defeats Lupe Pintor by a 14th-round knockout and Thomas Hearns defeats Wilfred Benitez by a 15 rounds majority decision; all four boxers are later enshrined as members of the International Boxing Hall of Fame.

== Canadian football ==
- Grey Cup – Edmonton Eskimos won 32–16 over the Toronto Argonauts, the Eskimos' record fifth consecutive Grey Cup victory.
- Vanier Cup – UBC Thunderbirds won 39–14 over the Western Ontario Mustangs

== Cricket ==
- Graham Gooch leads a "rebel" team of players on tour of South Africa, banned from official cricket since 1970 because of apartheid.

== Cycling ==
- Giro d'Italia won by Bernard Hinault of France
- Tour de France – Bernard Hinault of France
- UCI Road World Championships – Men's road race – Giuseppe Saronni of Italy

== Dogsled racing ==
- Iditarod Trail Sled Dog Race Champion –
  - Rick Swenson won with lead sled dog – Andy

== Field hockey ==
- Men's World Cup held in Bombay won by Pakistan
- Men's Champions Trophy held at Amstelveen in the Netherlands and won by the host nation

== Figure skating ==
- World Figure Skating Championship –
  - Men's champion: Scott Hamilton, United States
  - Ladies' champion: Elaine Zayak, United States
  - Pair skating champions: Sabine Baeß & Tassilo Thierbach, Germany
  - Ice dancing champions: Jayne Torvill & Christopher Dean, Great Britain

== Gaelic Athletic Association ==
- Camogie
  - All-Ireland Camogie Champion: Cork
  - National Camogie League: Kilkenny
- Gaelic football
  - All-Ireland Senior Football Championship – Offaly 1-15 died Kerry 0-17
  - National Football League – Kerry 1-9 died Cork 0-5 (replay)
- Ladies' Gaelic football
  - All-Ireland Senior Football Champion: Kerry
  - National Football League: Kerry
- Hurling
  - All-Ireland Senior Hurling Championship – Kilkenny 3-18 died Cork 1-13
  - National Hurling League – Kilkenny 2–14 beat Wexford 1–11

== Golf ==
Men's professional

- Masters Tournament – Craig Stadler
- U.S. Open – Tom Watson
- British Open – Tom Watson
- PGA Championship – Raymond Floyd
- PGA Tour money leader – Craig Stadler – $446,462
- Senior PGA Tour money leader – Miller Barber – $106,890

Men's amateur

- British Amateur – Martin Thompson
- U.S. Amateur – Jay Sigel

Women's professional

- LPGA Championship – Jan Stephenson
- U.S. Women's Open – Janet Anderson
- Classique Peter Jackson Classic – Sandra Haynie
- LPGA Tour money leader – JoAnne Carner – $310,400

== Harness racing ==
- United States Pacing Triple Crown races –
  1. Cane Pace – Cam Fella
  2. Little Brown Jug – Merger
  3. Messenger Stakes – Cam Fella
- United States Trotting Triple Crown races –
  1. Hambletonian – Speed Bowl
  2. Yonkers Trot – Mystic Park
  3. Kentucky Futurity – Jazz Cosmos
- Australian Inter Dominion Harness Racing Championship –
  - Pacers: Rhett's Law

== Horse racing ==
Steeplechases

- Cheltenham Gold Cup – Silver Buck
- Grand National – Grittar

Flat races

- Australia – Melbourne Cup won by Gurner's Lane
- Canada – Queen's Plate won by Son of Briartic
- France – Prix de l'Arc de Triomphe won by Akiyda
- Ireland – Irish Derby Stakes won by Assert
- Japan – Japan Cup won by Half Iced
- English Triple Crown Races:
  1. 2,000 Guineas Stakes – Zino
  2. The Derby – Golden Fleece
  3. St. Leger Stakes – Touching Wood
- United States Triple Crown Races:
  1. Kentucky Derby – Gato Del Sol
  2. 1982 Preakness Stakes – Aloma's Ruler
  3. Belmont Stakes – Conquistador Cielo

== Ice hockey ==
- Art Ross Trophy as the NHL's leading scorer during the regular season: Wayne Gretzky, Edmonton Oilers
- Hart Memorial Trophy for the NHL's Most Valuable Player: Wayne Gretzky, Edmonton Oilers
- Stanley Cup – New York Islanders win 4-0 over the Vancouver Canucks
- World Hockey Championship –
  - Men's champion: Soviet Union defeated Czechoslovakia
  - Junior Men's champion: Canada defeated Czechoslovakia

== Rugby league ==
- 1982 Kangaroo tour of Great Britain and France
- 1982 KB Cup
- 1982 New Zealand rugby league season
- 1982 NSWRFL season – Parramatta Eels win their second title, defeating Manly-Warringah Sea Eagles 21-8 in the final.
- 1981–82 Rugby Football League season / 1982–83 Rugby Football League season
- 1982 State of Origin series

== Rugby union ==
- 88th Five Nations Championship series is won by Ireland

== Snooker ==
- World Snooker Championship – Alex Higgins beats Ray Reardon 18-15
- World rankings – Ray Reardon becomes world number one for 1982/83

== Swimming ==
- The fourth FINA World Championships held in Guayaquil, Ecuador

== Tennis ==
- Grand Slam in tennis men's results:
  1. Australian Open – Johan Kriek
  2. French Open – Mats Wilander
  3. Wimbledon championships – Jimmy Connors
  4. U.S. Open – Jimmy Connors
- Grand Slam in tennis women's results:
  1. Australian Open – Chris Evert
  2. French Open – Martina Navratilova
  3. Wimbledon championships – Martina Navratilova
  4. U.S. Open – Chris Evert
- Davis Cup – United States won 4-1 over France in world tennis.
- Billie Jean King makes her final singles appearance at the US Open, losing in the first round.
- Total prize money at US Open exceeds 1 million US dollars.

== Volleyball ==
- 1982 FIVB Men's World Championship held in Buenos Aires, Argentina won by USSR
- 1982 FIVB Women's World Championship held in Lima, Peru won by China

== Water polo ==
- Men's World Championship held in Guayaquil, Ecuador, won by USSR

== Multi-sport events ==
- Asian Games held in New Delhi, India
- Central American and Caribbean Games held in Havana, Cuba
- Commonwealth Games held in Brisbane, Australia

== Awards ==
- Associated Press Male Athlete of the Year – Wayne Gretzky, NHL ice hockey
- Associated Press Female Athlete of the Year – Mary Decker, Track and field
- ABC's Wide World of Sports Athlete of the Year: Wayne Gretzky
