= On the House (horse) =

French-bred Thoroughbred racehorse

On The House
- Sire: Be My Guest
- Grandsire: Northern Dancer
- Dam: Lora
- Damsire: Lorenzaccio
- Sex: Mare
- Foaled: 20 March 1979
- Country: United Kingdom
- Colour: Bay
- Breeder: Hascombe & Valiants Studs
- Owner: Sir Philip Oppenheimer
- Trainer: Harry Wragg
- Record: 10:4-1-1

Major wins
- 1000 Guineas (1982); Sussex Stakes (1982)

Awards
- Timeform rating: 109 (1981), 125 (1982)

On The House (20 March 1979 – 1999) was a British-bred, British-trained Thoroughbred racehorse and broodmare best known for winning the classic 1000 Guineas in 1982. She was one of the best British two-year-old fillies of 1981 when she won two races and finished second in the Cheveley Park Stakes. In the following spring she ran poorly in her first race but then recorded an upset victory in the 169th running of the 1000 Guineas. After being beaten in her next two races she again upset the odds by winning the all-aged Sussex Stakes. After her retirement from racing she had some success as a broodmare and is the female-line ancestor of Cracksman.

== Background ==
On The House was a bay mare with a broken white stripe and three white socks bred in England by Hascombe & Valiants Studs, a breeding organisation run by Philip Oppenheimer a member of the family that controlled the De Beers Mining Company. She was from the first crop of foals sired by Be My Guest, an American-bred stallion who won the Waterford Crystal Mile when trained in Ireland by Vincent O'Brien. Be My Guest's other offspring included Assert, Pentire Go and Go and Luth Enchantee. Her dam Lora was a granddaughter of the 1000 Guineas runner-up Tessa Gillian, whose other descendants have included Habibti, Octagonal and Golden Horn.

As a yearling, On The House was sent to the Houghton sales at Newmarket, but failed to reach her reserve price and therefore raced in the Oppenheimer colours of black, white and red. She was sent into training with Harry Wragg at his Abington Place Stables in Newmarket.

== Racing career ==
=== 1981: two-year-old season ===
On The House began her racing career by running in a six furlong maiden race at Ascot Racecourse in July when she started favourite but finished sixth of the eleven runners behind Johara. A month later she was brought back in distance for the St Hugh's Stakes at Newbury Racecourse and recorded her first success as she won by one and a half lengths from Lavender Dance. At Doncaster On The House started favourite for the Crathorne Stakes over six furlongs despite carrying top weight in a field of eight. The filly did not have a clear run but accelerated in the closing stages to win by half a length from Apples of Gold.

On her final appearance of the season, On The House was moved up in class to contest the Group One Cheveley Park Stakes over six furlong at Newmarket Racecourse. Ridden by Lester Piggott she was well-supported in the betting and started 5/2 joint-favourite with the Irish-trained filly Woodstream, the winner of the Moyglare Stud Stakes. On The House and Woodstream went to the front approaching the final furlong and raced alongside each other for a few strides, but the Irish filly pulled ahead in the closing stages and won by one and a half lengths. On The House went into the winter break as third favourite (behind Woodstream and Circus Ring) for the following year's 1000 Guineas, although the independent Timeform organisation expressed doubts about her ability to stay the one mile distance.

=== 1982: three-year-old season ===
On The House began her three-year-old season in the Nell Gwyn Stakes, a trial race for the 1000 Guineas, run over seven furlongs at Newmarket. Ridden by Pat Eddery, she ran well for much of the way but faded in the closing stages and finished fifth behind the Henry Cecil-trained Chalon. The race appeared to confirm the suspicion that on the House lacked stamina, and Eddery opted to ride Merlin's Charm in the 1000 Guineas over Newmarket's Rowley Mile course on 29 April. On The House was ridden for the first time by John Reid and started a 33/1 outsider in a field of fifteen fillies, with the French-trained Play It Safe, the winner of the Prix Marcel Boussac, being made the 5/2 favourite. Reid positioned the filly just behind the leaders as Hello Cuddles and Time Charter set a strong pace. On The House moved into the lead two furlongs from the finish, went clear of the field and won by two and a half lengths from Time Charter, who was in turn two length clear of Dione (later to win the Prix de l'Opéra) in third. Her success was a first classic win for Reid, and the third in the race for her 79-year-old trainer Harry Wragg following Full Dress and Abermaid: he had also won the race three times as a jockey. On The House next appeared in the Irish 1000 Guineas at the Curragh on 22 May. She started 3/1 favourite in a field of twenty-four, but after briefly taking the lead in the straight she finished third, beaten a length and a short head by Prince's Polly and Woodstream.

In the Coronation Stakes at Royal Ascot in June on the House again faced the Nell Gwyn winner Chalon who had not run in the Guineas. On The House appeared unsuited by the slow pace and failed to produce her best form, finishing fifth behind Chalon. Wragg reportedly felt that the filly had not fully recovered from her run in Ireland. At Goodwood Racecourse in July, On The House was matched against colts and older horses for the first time in the Sussex Stakes. Sandhurst Prince, Tender King and The Wonder were made co-favourites at 4/1 with on the House relatively unfancied at odds of 14/1. She turned in to the straight in fourth place and was then moved to the outside to make her challenge. She overtook Achieved and Bel Bolide inside the final furlong and held off the late run of Sandhurst Prince to win by half a length. As a Group One winner, On The House carried a seven-pound weight penalty when she reappeared in the Waterford Crystal Mile (run over the same course and distance as the Susesx Stakes) on 28 August. She reached second place in the straight but dropped away in the closing stages and finished sixth behind Sandhurst Prince.

== Assessment ==
In the Free Handicap, an official rating of the best two-year-olds to race in Britain in 1981, On The House was given a weight of 119 Pound, five pounds below the top-rated filly Circus Ring. Timeform were less impressed, assessing her as being thirteen pounds inferior to Circus Ring with a rating of 109. In the following year she was rated on 125 by Timeform, six pounds behind the top-rated three-year-old fillies Akiyda and Time Charter. In the International Classification she was rated the seventh-best three-year-old filly in Europe. In their book, A Century of Champions, based on the Timeform rating system, John Randall and Tony Morris rated on the House an "average" winner of the 1000 Guineas.

== Stud career ==
On The House was retired from racing to become a broodmare for her owner's Hascombe & Valiants Studs. She produced at least eleven foals and five winners between 1984 and 1998:

- Domus (GB) (grey colt, foaled 1 January 1984, sired by Kalaglow), won two races from ten starts in England 1987–89
- Widow's Walk (chestnut filly, foaled 1 January 1985, by Habitat) – unplaced from one race in England 1988
- Tulwar (bay colt, foaled 1 March 1987, by Kris) – unplaced from one race in England 1991
- Rendalls (bay colt, foaled 1 January 1988, by Top Ville) – unplaced from 2 starts in England 1991
- Upper House (bay colt, foaled 29 March 1989, by Shirley Heights) – won 3 races and placed second once from 9 starts in England 1991–92
- Castel Rosselo (brown colt, foaled 22 February 1990, by Rousillon) won four races and placed 9 times from 37 starts in England 1992–99
- Art of War (bay colt, foaled 12 February 1992, by Machiavellian) won three races from 6 starts in England 1994–95 including LR Sirenia Stakes, Kempton Park
- St Radegund (bay filly, foaled 17 January 1994, by Green Desert), won one race from 2 starts in England during 1997 Grand-dam of Cracksman.
- Miss Penton (GB) (chestnut filly, foaled 21 March 1995, by Primo Dominie), placed twice from 6 starts in England 1998; dam of the G2 Royal Lodge Stakes winner Leo (GB).
- Mukhtaal (GB) (bay colt, foaled 16 April 1996, by Machiavellian) – unraced
- Athenian Prince (chestnut colt, 1998, by Lion Cavern) – multiple winner in minor racing country

Died in 1999.

== Pedigree ==
Pedigree of On The House (FR), bay mare, 1979
Sire Be My Guest (USA) 1974	Northern Dancer (CAN); 1961	Nearctic	Nearco
Sire Be My Guest (USA) 1974	Northern Dancer (CAN); 1961	Nearctic	Lady Angela
Sire Be My Guest (USA) 1974	Northern Dancer (CAN); 1961	Natalma	Native Dancer
Sire Be My Guest (USA) 1974	Northern Dancer (CAN); 1961	Natalma	Almahmoud
Sire Be My Guest (USA) 1974	What a Treat (USA); 1962	Tudor Minstrel	Owen Tudor
Sire Be My Guest (USA) 1974	What a Treat (USA); 1962	Tudor Minstrel	Sansonnet
Sire Be My Guest (USA) 1974	What a Treat (USA); 1962	Rare Treat	Stymie
Sire Be My Guest (USA) 1974	What a Treat (USA); 1962	Rare Treat	Rare Perfume
Dam Lora (GB) 1972	Lorenzaccio (GB); 1965	Klairon	Clarion
Dam Lora (GB) 1972	Lorenzaccio (GB); 1965	Klairon	Kalmia
Dam Lora (GB) 1972	Lorenzaccio (GB); 1965	Phoenissa	The Phoenix
Dam Lora (GB) 1972	Lorenzaccio (GB); 1965	Phoenissa	Erica Fragrans
Dam Lora (GB) 1972	Courtessa (GB); 1955	Supreme Court	Precipitation
Dam Lora (GB) 1972	Courtessa (GB); 1955	Supreme Court	Forecourt
Dam Lora (GB) 1972	Courtessa (GB); 1955	Tessa Gillian	Nearco
Dam Lora (GB) 1972	Courtessa (GB); 1955	Tessa Gillian	Sun Princess (Family: 9-c)
