= 1983 in sports =

1983 in sports describes the year's events in world sport.

== Alpine skiing ==
- Alpine Skiing World Cup:
  - Men's overall season champion: Phil Mahre, United States
  - Women's overall season champion: Tamara McKinney, United States

== American football ==
- Super Bowl XVII – the Washington Redskins (NFC) won 27–17 over the Miami Dolphins (AFC)
  - Location: Rose Bowl
  - Attendance: 103,667
  - MVP: John Riggins, RB (Washington)
- January 3 – Tony Dorsett sets NFL record for longest run from scrimmage by rushing for 99 yard touchdown.
- January 26 – death of Paul "Bear" Bryant, noted college football coach
- Sugar Bowl (1982 season):
  - The Penn State Nittany Lions won 27-23 over the Georgia Bulldogs to win the college football national championship
- Michigan Panthers win United States Football League Championship, 24-22 over Philadelphia Stars
- October 31 – death of George Halas, Chicago Bears founder and coach

== Artistic gymnastics ==
- World Artistic Gymnastics Championships –
  - Men's all-around champion: Dmitry Bilozerchev, USSR
  - Women's all-around champion: Natalia Yurchenko, USSR
  - Men's team competition champion: China
  - Women's team competition champion: USSR

== Association football ==
- World Club Championship – Grêmio (Brazil) 2-1 Hamburger SV (Germany)
- UEFA Champions League – Hamburg 1-0 Juventus
- Copa Libertadores de América – Two legs; 1st leg Peñarol 1-1 Grêmio; 2nd leg Grêmio 2-1 Peñarol; Grêmio won 3-2 on aggregate
- UEFA Cup – Two legs; 1st leg Anderlecht 1-0 Benfica; 2nd leg Benfica 1-1 Anderlecht; Anderlecht won 2-1 on aggregate
- Cup Winners' Cup – Aberdeen 2-1 Real Madrid (AET)
- Super Cup – Two legs; 1st leg Hamburg 0-0 Aberdeen; 2nd leg Aberdeen 2-0 Hamburg; Aberdeen won 2-0 on aggregate
- England - FA Cup – Manchester United won 2 - 2 (aet); 4 - 0 (replay) over Brighton & Hove Albion
- FIFA decided to give to Mexico the right to host the Football World Cup 1986 after Colombia announced the reject to celebrate the event.
- Scotland – Dundee United won the First Division for the first time in their history. They won the league at their rivals home ground Dens Park of Dundee.

== Athletics ==
- January 18 – International Olympic Committee (IOC) restores medals to the family of Jim Thorpe
- February 27 – Ireland's Eamonn Coghlan sets a new World Indoor Record for the mile, clocking 3:49.78 at East Rutherford in New Jersey
- August 7 – 14 – The inaugural World Championships in Athletics are held in Helsinki, Finland

== Australian rules football ==
- Victorian Football League
  - June 18 – Fitzroy achieve an amazing win in a top-of-the-ladder clash with North Melbourne, winning 34.16 (220) to 10.10 (70) and more than doubling the previous biggest loss by an eventual minor premier of 69 points.
  - July 23 – Fitzroy with 12.6 (78) and St. Kilda with 7.1 (43) kick a record quarter aggregate of 19.7 (121) during the second quarter.
  - August 5 – Richmond's Kevin Bartlett became the first player to play 400 VFL games against Collingwood. Only Michael Tuck, Brent Harvey and Dustin Fletcher have since equalled his achievement.
  - Hawthorn wins the 87th VFL Premiership, beating Essendon 20.20 (140) to 8.9 (57)
  - Brownlow Medal awarded to Ross Glendinning (North Melbourne)

== Baseball ==
- January 12 – Brooks Robinson and Juan Marichal are elected to the Hall of Fame. Robinson, winner of 16 straight Gold Glove Awards and hero of the 1970 World Series, becomes the 14th player elected in his first year of eligibility. Marichal, the winningest Latin American pitcher in major league history, won 20 or more games six times and had an ERA of 2.50 or less six times.
- World Series – Baltimore Orioles win their most recent World Series 4 games to 1 over the Philadelphia Phillies

== Basketball ==
- NCAA Men's Basketball Championship –
  - North Carolina State wins 54-52 over Houston
- NCAA Women's Division I Basketball Championship
  - University of Southern California(USC) wins 69–67 over Louisiana Tech
- NBA Finals – Philadelphia 76ers won 4 games to 0 over the Los Angeles Lakers
- National Basketball League (Australia) Finals:
  - Canberra Cannons defeated the West Adelaide Bearcats 75–73 in the final.
- Philippine Basketball League, as predecessor for PBA Developmental League, first officially game held on May 6.

== Boxing ==
- May 31 – death of Jack Dempsey, former world heavyweight champion
- May 20 – for the first time ever, two world Heavyweight champions defend their titles the same night, at the same place: Larry Holmes retains the WBC title defeating future two time world champion Tim Witherspoon, and Michael Dokes retains his WBA title with a 15-round draw (tie) against former world champion Mike Weaver.
- June 16 – Roberto Durán wins his third world title, knocking out WBA world Jr. Middleweight champion Davey Moore in eight rounds.
- November 10 – Marvin Hagler retains his unified world Middleweight title with a 15-round unanimous decision over Roberto Durán. It was 1983's most anticipated bout.

== Canadian football ==
- Grey Cup – Toronto Argonauts won 18–17 over the B.C. Lions
- Vanier Cup – Calgary Dinos won 31–21 over the Queen's Golden Gaels

== Cricket ==
- Cricket World Cup – India beat West Indies by 43 runs.
- Asian Cricket Council formed.

== Cycling ==
- Giro d'Italia won by Giuseppe Saronni of Italy
- Tour de France – Laurent Fignon of France
- UCI Road World Championships – Men's road race – Greg LeMond of the United States

== Dogsled racing ==
- Iditarod Trail Sled Dog Race Champion –
  - Rick Mackey won with lead dogs: Preacher & Jody

== Field hockey ==
- Men's European Nations Cup held at Amstelveen won by the Netherlands
- Men's Champions Trophy held at Karachi won by Australia
- Pan American Games (Men's Competition) held in Caracas won by Canada
- Women's World Cup held in Kuala Lumpur won by the Netherlands

== Figure skating ==
- World Figure Skating Championships –
  - Men's champion: Scott Hamilton, United States
  - Ladies' champion: Rosalynn Sumners, United States
  - Pair skating champions: Elena Valova & Oleg Vasiliev, Soviet Union
  - Ice dancing champions: Jayne Torvill & Christopher Dean, Great Britain

== Gaelic Athletic Association ==
- Camogie
  - All-Ireland Camogie Champion: Cork
  - National Camogie League: Dublin
- Gaelic football
  - All-Ireland Senior Football Championship – Dublin 1-10 died Galway 1-8
  - National Football League – Down 1-8 died Armagh 0-8
- Ladies' Gaelic football
  - All-Ireland Senior Football Champion: Kerry
  - National Football League: Kerry
- Hurling
  - All-Ireland Senior Hurling Championship – Kilkenny 3-18 died Cork 1-13
  - National Hurling League – Kilkenny 2–14 beat Limerick 2–12

== Golf ==
Men's professional

- Masters Tournament – Seve Ballesteros
- U.S. Open – Larry Nelson
- British Open – Tom Watson
- PGA Championship – Hal Sutton
- PGA Tour money leader – Hal Sutton ($426,668)
- Senior PGA Tour money leader – Don January ($237,571)
- Ryder Cup – United States won 14½ - 13½ over Europe in team golf.

Men's amateur

- British Amateur – Philip Parkin
- U.S. Amateur – Jay Sigel

Women's professional

- Nabisco Dinah Shore – Amy Alcott
- LPGA Championship – Patty Sheehan
- U.S. Women's Open – Jan Stephenson
- Classique Peter Jackson Classic – Hollis Stacy
- LPGA Tour money leader – JoAnne Carner ($291,404)

== Harness racing ==
- Ralph Hanover wins the United States Pacing Triple Crown races –
- # Cane Pace – Ralph Hanover
- # Little Brown Jug – Ralph Hanover
- # Messenger Stakes – Ralph Hanover
- United States Trotting Triple Crown races –
- # Hambletonian – Duenna
- # Yonkers Trot – Joie De Vie
- # Kentucky Futurity – Power Seat
- Australian Inter Dominion Harness Racing Championship –
  - Pacers: Gammalite
  - Trotters: Scotch Notch

== Horse racing ==
- February 8 – champion racehorse Shergar is kidnapped from Ballymany Stud, near the Curragh in County Kildare, Ireland. No trace of the horse has ever been found.

Steeplechases

- Cheltenham Gold Cup – Bregawn
- Grand National – Corbiere

Flat races

- Australia – Melbourne Cup won by Kiwi
- Canada – Queen's Plate won by Bompago
- France – Prix de l'Arc de Triomphe won by All Along
- Ireland – Irish Derby Stakes won by Shareef Dancer
- Japan – Japan Cup won by Stanerra
- English Triple Crown Races:
  1. 2,000 Guineas Stakes – Lomond
  2. The Derby – Teenoso
  3. St. Leger Stakes – Sun Princess
- United States Triple Crown Races:
  1. Kentucky Derby – Sunny's Halo
  2. Preakness Stakes – Deputed Testimony
  3. Belmont Stakes – Caveat

== Ice hockey ==
- Art Ross Trophy as the NHL's leading scorer during the regular season: Wayne Gretzky, Edmonton Oilers
- Hart Memorial Trophy for the NHL's Most Valuable Player: Wayne Gretzky, Edmonton Oilers
- Stanley Cup – New York Islanders win 4-0 over the Edmonton Oilers
- World Hockey Championship –
  - Men's champion: Soviet Union defeated Czechoslovakia
  - Junior Men's champion: USSR defeated Czechoslovakia

== Radiosport ==
- First European High Speed Telegraphy Championships held in Moscow, Russia.

== Rugby league ==
- 1983 KB Cup
- 1983 New Zealand rugby league season
- 1983 NSWRFL season
- 1982–83 Rugby Football League season / 1983–84 Rugby Football League season
- 1983 State of Origin series

== Rugby union ==
- 89th Five Nations Championship series is shared by France and Ireland

== Snooker ==
- World Snooker Championship – Steve Davis beats Cliff Thorburn 18-6
- World rankings – Steve Davis becomes world number one for 1983/84

== Swimming ==
- Pan American Games in Caracas, Venezuela

== Tennis ==
- Grand Slam in tennis men's results:
- # Australian Open – Mats Wilander
- # French Open – Yannick Noah
- # Wimbledon championships – John McEnroe
- # U.S. Open – Jimmy Connors
- Grand Slam in tennis women's results:
- # Australian Open – Martina Navratilova
- # French Open – Chris Evert
- # Wimbledon championships – Martina Navratilova
- # U.S. Open – Martina Navratilova
- Davis Cup – Australia won 3-2 over Sweden.

== Volleyball ==
- Asian Volleyball Championships held in Japan: both men's and women's tournaments won by Japan
- European Volleyball Championship held in East Germany won by USSR (men) and DDR (women)
- Volleyball at the 1983 Pan American Games held in Caracas won by Brazil (men) and Cuba (women)

== Water polo ==
- 1983 FINA Men's Water Polo World Cup held in Malibu, California won by USSR
- Men's competition at Pan American Games in Caracas won by USA
- 1983 FINA Women's Water Polo World Cup held in Sainte-Foy, Quebec City, Canada, won by the Netherlands

== Yacht racing ==
- Australia II, of the Royal Perth Yacht Club, wins the America's Cup over Liberty, from the New York Yacht Club, 4 races to 3; the victory breaks a 132-year winning streak by the NYYC through 25 Cup challenges, the longest-running unbeaten streak in all of sports

== Multi-sport events ==
- Ninth Pan American Games held in Caracas, Venezuela
- Ninth Mediterranean Games held in Casablanca, Morocco
- Twelfth Summer Universiade held in Edmonton, Alberta, Canada
- Eleventh Winter Universiade held in Sofia, Bulgaria

== Awards ==
- Associated Press Male Athlete of the Year – Carl Lewis, Track and field
- Associated Press Female Athlete of the Year – Martina Navratilova, Tennis
