= Luth Enchantee =

French-bred Thoroughbred racehorse

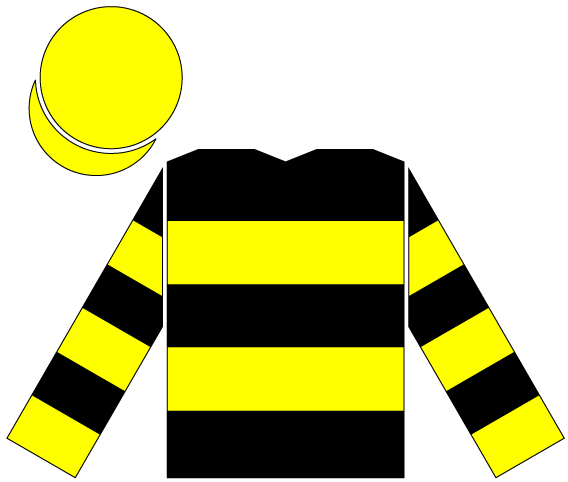
- Racing colours of Paul de Moussac
- Sire: Be My Guest
- Grandsire: Northern Dancer
- Dam: Viole d'Amour
- Damsire: Luthier
- Sex: Stallion
- Foaled: 1980
- Country: France
- Colour: Chestnut
- Breeder: Paul de Moussac
- Owner: Paul de Moussac
- Trainer: John Cunnington Jr.
- Record: 19:4-4-1

Major wins
- Prix d'Astarte (1983); Prix Jacques Le Marois (1983); Prix du Moulin (1983)

Honours
- Timeform rating 130 (1983), 112 (1984); Timeform best miler (1983)

Luth Enchantee (foaled 1980) was a French Thoroughbred racehorse and broodmare who was named the best horse in Europe over one mile in 1983. Her early career was undistinguished, as she won one minor event in her first eight races. In the summer of her three-year-old season she made rapid improvement, winning the Prix d'Astarte against her own sex and then defeating male opposition to win France's two most important all-aged mile races, the Prix Jacques Le Marois and the Prix du Moulin. In autumn she was moved up in distance and finished a close third to All Along in the Prix de l'Arc de Triomphe. Her subsequent racing career was disappointing as she finished unplaced in her remaining seven starts. She made little impact as a broodmare.

== Background ==
Luth Enchantee was a lightly built chestnut mare with a white sock on her right hind leg, bred by her owner Paul de Moussac at his Haras du Mezeray near Ticheville. She was from the second crop of foals sired by Be My Guest, an American-bred stallion who won the Waterford Crystal Mile when trained in Ireland by Vincent O'Brien. Be My Guest's other offspring included Assert, Pentire Go and Go and On The House.

Luth Enchantee was trained at Chantilly by John Cunnington a Frenchman of British descent and was ridden in her most important races by the French jockey Maurice Philipperon.

== Racing career ==
=== 1982: two-year-old season ===
Luth Enchantee ran twice as a two-year-old in 1982. She finished second on her debut over 1600 metre and then ran unplaced in a race over 1500m.

=== 1983: three-year-old season ===
Luth Enchantee was beaten in her first four races as a three-year-old although she finished second three times, most notably in the Prix de Sandringham over 1600m at Chantilly Racecourse in June, when she was beaten a neck by Chamisene. Later in June she recorded her first win at the seventh attempt when taking the Prix des Dahlias, a maiden race at Saint-Cloud Racecourse. On her next appearance she was moved back up into Group race company and finished fourth behind African Joy in the Prix de la Porte Maillot over 1400m at Longchamp Racecourse.

The emergence of Luth Enchantee a top-class racehorse began with her run in the Prix d'Astarte (then a Group Two race) over 1600m at Deauville Racecourse in early August. She won the race by one and a half lengths from the British filly Mighty Fly (winner of the Royal Hunt Cup), with the 1000 Guineas winner Ma Biche in sixth. Later that month, Luth Enchantee was moved up in class for the Group One Prix Jacques Le Marois over the same course and distance. She started at odds of 13/1 in a field including L'Emigrant, Ma Biche, Noalcoholic and Crystal Glitters (Prix d'Ispahan). Philipperon restrained the filly in the early stages before taking the lead 200m from the finish, and he won decisively by one and a half lengths from L'Emigrant with the British outsider Montekin in third. Three weeks later Luth Enchantee started the 4.8/1 second favourite for the Prix du Moulin at Longchamp. Philipperon again employed waiting tactics, and the filly turned into the straight last of the eight runners. L'Emigrant went clear of the field and looked the likely winner, but Luth Enchantee produced an exceptional finishing burst, making up ten lengths in last 400m, catching the colt in the closing strides and winning by half a length. There was a gap of eight lengths back to the Irish 2000 Guineas winner Wassl in third. After the race, Philipperon described the filly as "the best horse I have ever ridden".

Luth Enchantee was moved up in distance for her two remaining races of 1983. On 2 October she started at odds of 17/1 for the Prix de l'Arc de Triomphe over 2400 m at Longchamp. As in her previous races, she was held up in the early stages before Philipperon switched her to the outside to make her run in the straight. She made up ground rapidly, overtaking at least ten horses in the last 300 m and finishing third, beaten one length and a "short neck" by All Along and Sun Princess. The beaten horses included leading middle-distance specialists such as Time Charter, Sagace, Awaasif and Stanerra. The filly ended her season in California when she contested the Yellow Ribbon Stakes at Santa Anita Park in November. Luth Enchantee failed to reproduce her best form and finished unplaced behind the five-year-old mare Sangue in a rough race. She was reported to be "coughing" after the race.

=== 1984: four-year-old season ===
Luth Enchantee remained in training as a four-year-old but failed to recover her best form. She failed to win in six races, with her best effort coming in July, when she finished fourth behind Teenoso in the Grand Prix de Saint-Cloud.

== Assessment ==
In 1984 she was given a rating of 112 by Timeform. In the following year, Timeform named her the season's best miler and rated her on 130, level with Sun Princess as the season's second highest-rated three-year-old filly, six pounds behind the sprinter Habibti. The official International Classification concurred by rating her equal with Sun Princess, although they rated Habibti only two pounds superior. She was the joint-fifth-best European horse of any age.

== Breeding record ==
Luth Enchantee was retired from racing to become a broodmare but had little success as a dam of winners. Her daughter Luth de Crystal (sired by Crystal Glitters) produced the filly Khumba Mela who won the Prix Chloé and the Noble Damsel Handicap.

== Pedigree ==
Pedigree of Luth Enchantee (FR), chestnut mare, 1980
Sire Be My Guest (USA) 1974	Northern Dancer (CAN); 1961	Nearctic	Nearco
Sire Be My Guest (USA) 1974	Northern Dancer (CAN); 1961	Nearctic	Lady Angela
Sire Be My Guest (USA) 1974	Northern Dancer (CAN); 1961	Natalma	Native Dancer
Sire Be My Guest (USA) 1974	Northern Dancer (CAN); 1961	Natalma	Almahmoud
Sire Be My Guest (USA) 1974	What a Treat (USA); 1962	Tudor Minstrel	Owen Tudor
Sire Be My Guest (USA) 1974	What a Treat (USA); 1962	Tudor Minstrel	Sansonnet
Sire Be My Guest (USA) 1974	What a Treat (USA); 1962	Rare Treat	Stymie
Sire Be My Guest (USA) 1974	What a Treat (USA); 1962	Rare Treat	Rare Perfume
Dam Viole d'Amour (FR) 1972	Luthier (FR); 1965	Klairon	Clarion
Dam Viole d'Amour (FR) 1972	Luthier (FR); 1965	Klairon	Kalmia
Dam Viole d'Amour (FR) 1972	Luthier (FR); 1965	Flute Enchantee	Cranach
Dam Viole d'Amour (FR) 1972	Luthier (FR); 1965	Flute Enchantee	Montagnana
Dam Viole d'Amour (FR) 1972	Mandolinette (FR); 1963	Yorick	Sunny Boy
Dam Viole d'Amour (FR) 1972	Mandolinette (FR); 1963	Yorick	Lady Macbeth
Dam Viole d'Amour (FR) 1972	Mandolinette (FR); 1963	Malveillante	Rhodora
Dam Viole d'Amour (FR) 1972	Mandolinette (FR); 1963	Malveillante	Malvia (Family: 20-d)
