= 1983 Prix de l'Arc de Triomphe =

- Location: Longchamp Racecourse
- Date: October 2, 1983
- Winning horse: All Along

The 1983 Prix de l'Arc de Triomphe was a horse race held at Longchamp on Sunday 2 October 1983. It was the 62nd running of the Prix de l'Arc de Triomphe.

The winner was All Along, a four-year-old filly trained in France by Patrick Biancone and ridden by Walter Swinburn. The filly won by a length a short neck and a nose from Sun Princess, Luth Enchantee and Time Charter in a time of 2:28.1. Fillies took the first four places in the twenty-six runner field.

== Race details ==
- Sponsor: Trusthouse Forte
- Purse:
- Going: Firm
- Distance: 2,400 metres
- Number of runners: 26
- Winner's time: 2:28.1

== Full result ==
Pos.	Marg.	Horse	Age	Jockey	Trainer (Country)
1	1½	All Along	4	Walter Swinburn	Patrick Biancone (FR)
2	1	Sun Princess	3	Willie Carson	Dick Hern (GB)
3	snk	Luth Enchantee	3	Maurice Philipperon	John Cunnington, Jnr. (FR)
4	ns	Time Charter	4	Billy Newnes	Henry Candy (GB)
5	½	Salmon Leap	3	Pat Eddery	Vincent O'Brien (IRE)
6	hd	Stanerra	5	Brian Rouse	Frank Dunne (IRE)
7	snk	Lovely Dancer	3	Freddy Head	Olivier Douieb (FR)
8	1½	Zalataia	4	Gerard Dubroeucq	André Fabre (FR)
9	½	Lancastrian	6	Alain Lequeux	David Smaga (FR)
10	hd	Marie de Litz	3	Henri Samani	Robert Collet (FR)
11		Sagace	3	Alfred Gibert	Patrick Biancone (IRE)
12		Diamond Shoal	4	Steve Cauthen	Ian Balding
13		Awaasif	4	Lester Piggott	John Dunlop (GB)
14		Seymour Hicks	3	Bruce Raymond	John Dunlop (GB)
15		Orofino	5	Peter Alafi	Sven von Mitzlaff (GER)
16		Prima Voce	4	Geoff Baxter	Robert Armstrong (GB)
17		General Holme	4	Tony Murray	Olivier Douieb (FR)
18		Gun of Navarone	3	Philip Robinson	Clive Brittain (GB)
19		Escaline	3	Gary Moore	John Fellows (FR)
20		Dalby Jaguar	5	G Nording	(DEN)
21		Sharaya	3	Yves Saint-Martin	Alain de Royer Dupre (FR)
22		Welsh Term	4	Cash Asmussen	Robert Collet (FR)
23		Dom Pasquini	3	Alain Badel	Robert Collet (FR)
24		Acamas	8	Jean-Claude Desaint	(FR)
25		Dzudo	6	A McChesney	Albert Klimscha (FR)
26		Sailor's Dance	3	Joe Mercer	Dick Hern (GB)

- Abbreviations: ns = nose; shd = short-head; hd = head; snk = short neck; nk = neck

== Winner's details ==
Further details of the winner, All Along.

- Sex: Filly
- Foaled: 7 April 1979
- Country: France
- Sire: Targowice; Dam: Agujita (Round Table)
- Owner: Daniel Wildenstein
- Breeder: Daniel Wildenstein
