= 1982 Prix de l'Arc de Triomphe =

1982 horse race in Longchamp, France

- Location: Longchamp Racecourse
- Date: October 3, 1982
- Winning horse: Akiyda

The 1982 Prix de l'Arc de Triomphe was a horse race held at Longchamp on Sunday 3 October 1982. It was the 61st running of the Prix de l'Arc de Triomphe.

The winner was Akiyda, a three-year-old filly trained in France by François Mathet. The winning jockey was Yves Saint-Martin who was winning the race for the third time. The filly won by a neck from the British-trained six-year-old Ardross.

The winning time was 2m 37.0s.

== Race details ==
- Sponsor: Trusthouse Forte
- Purse:
- Going: Soft
- Distance: 2,400 metres
- Number of runners: 17
- Winner's time: 2m 37.0s

== Full result ==
Pos.	Marg.	Horse	Age	Jockey	Trainer (Country)
1		Akiyda	3	Yves Saint-Martin	François Mathet (FR)
2	hd	Ardross	6	Lester Piggott	Henry Cecil (GB)
3	½	Awaasif	3	Willie Carson	John Dunlop (GB)
4	hd	April Run	4	Cash Asmussen	François Boutin (FR)
5	4	Real Shadai	3	Maurice Philipperon	John Cunnington, Jnr. (FR)
6	1	No Attention	4	Alain Lequeux	Robert Collet (FR)
7	1½	Cadoudal	3	J-L Kessas	Bernard Secly (FR)
8	¾	Critique	4	Joe Mercer	Henry Cecil (GB)
9	shd	Harbour	3	Freddy Head	Criquette Head (FR)
10	¾	Newjdar	3	Guy Guignard	Patrick Biancone (FR)
11	hd	Assert	3	Pat Eddery	David O'Brien (IRE)
12	1½	Bikala	3	Serge Gorli	Patrick Biancone (FR)
13	1½	Bon Sang	3	Alfred Gibert	Mitri Saliba (FR)
14	2	Last Feather	3	Steve Cauthen	Barry Hills (GB)
15		All Along	3	Greville Starkey	Patrick Biancone (FR)
16		Mariacho	4	Gerard Dubroeucq	Maurice Zilber (FR)
17		Kastet	3	A Chavouev	(USSR)

* Abbreviations: shd = short-head; nk = neck

== Winner's details ==
Further details of the winner, Akiyda.

- Sex: Filly
- Foaled: 21 April 1979
- Country: United Kingdom
- Sire: Labus; Dam: Licata (Abdos)
- Owner: Aga Khan IV
- Breeder: Marcel Boussac
