= Snow Knight =

British-bred Thoroughbred racehorse (1971–1992)

- Racing silks of Sharon Phillips
- Sire: Firestreak
- Grandsire: Pardal
- Dam: Snow Blossom
- Damsire: Flush Royal
- Sex: Stallion
- Foaled: 28 February 1971
- Country: Great Britain
- Colour: Chestnut
- Breeder: J. A. Claude Lilley
- Owner: Sharon Phillips; Windfields Farm (1975)
- Trainer: 1) Peter Nelson (England); 2) James C. Bentley (Canada); 3) MacKenzie Miller (USA)
- Record: 22: 9-5-2
- Earnings: US$532,427 (equivalent)

Major wins
- Brighton Beach Handicap (1975); Man o' War Stakes (1975); Manhattan Handicap (1975); Canadian International Championship (1975); Seneca Handicap (1975); British Classic Race wins: Epsom Derby (1974)

Awards
- American Champion Male Turf Horse (1975)

Honours
- Aiken Thoroughbred Racing Hall of Fame (1977)
- Last updated on 25 August 2023

Snow Knight (28 February 1971 – 15 September 1992) was a Thoroughbred racehorse and sire. As a three-year-old in 1974, he won Britain's most prestigious race, the Derby, then the following year earned an Eclipse Award as the American Champion Male Turf Horse.

== Background ==
Snow Knight was bred by J. A. Claude Lilley, a textile manufacturer and the proprietor of Quarry Stud on Duffield Bank in Makeney, Derbyshire. Lilley had owned and raced Pretendre, sire of the 1971 Kentucky Derby and Preakness Stakes winner, Canonero II. Snow Knight's dam was Snow Blossom, a daughter of Flush Royal, winner of England's Great Yorkshire Stakes and the Prix Noailles in France. His sire was the speedy runner Firestreak who had been owned by Canadian lawyer Neil F. Phillips, whose wife Sharon purchased Snow Knight at auction as a yearling for £5,200.

== Racing career ==
=== Europe ===
Trained by Peter Nelson, at the age of two Snow Knight made five starts, winning two and finishing second twice. At three, in the trial races for the Derby, he finished second in the Ladbrokes Classic Trial Stakes at Sandown Park and third in the Lingfield Derby Trial.

Small injuries slowed him but he would fight back. Always a fractious colt, in the paddock at Epsom Downs Racecourse, Snow Knight threw jockey Brian Taylor, and at the starting gate was still fighting his handlers, before Tylor famously rode him to victory that day in the 1974 Epsom Derby. Sent off at odds of 50:1, he ran in the middle of the pack until the field made the turn at Tattenham Corner, when he sped to the lead and won by two lengths.

=== North America ===
In the fall of 1974, Snow Knight was sold for a reported C$1 million to Canada's leading horseman, E. P. Taylor, and sent to Taylor's Windfields Farm in Ontario. For new trainer Jim Bentley, Snow Knight made three starts at Toronto's Woodbine Racetrack but performed poorly. For the 1975 racing season, Snow Knight was sent to race in the United States, where MacKenzie Miller was entrusted with his race conditioning. Miller, known for his patience, spent months working with the high-strung colt. His diligence paid off when Snow Knight won the important Manhattan Handicap and Man o' War Stakes. Sent back to Woodbine Racetrack for the prestigious Canadian International Championship, he defeated an international field on the turf.

== Honours and awards ==
On 23 January 1977, Snow Knight was elected to the Aiken Thoroughbred Racing Hall of Fame. He was voted American Champion Male Turf Horse in the Eclipse Awards for 1975.

Retired to stud duty at Windfields Farm, in 1986 Snow Knight was sent to stand in Australia and Died on 15 September 1992. Although he met with limited success as a sire, Snow Knight did sire the outstanding racemare Awaasif who won the Yorkshire Oaks and the Gran Premio del Jockey Club and finished third in the 1982 Prix de l'Arc de Triomphe.

== Pedigree ==
Pedigree of Snow Knight (GB), chestnut stallion, 1971
Sire Firestreak (GB) 1956	Pardal (FR); 1947	Pharis	Pharos
Sire Firestreak (GB) 1956	Pardal (FR); 1947	Pharis	Carissima
Sire Firestreak (GB) 1956	Pardal (FR); 1947	Adargatis	Asterus
Sire Firestreak (GB) 1956	Pardal (FR); 1947	Adargatis	Helene de Troie
Sire Firestreak (GB) 1956	Hot Spell (GB); 1944	Umidwar	Blandford
Sire Firestreak (GB) 1956	Hot Spell (GB); 1944	Umidwar	Uganda
Sire Firestreak (GB) 1956	Hot Spell (GB); 1944	Haymaker	Hyperion
Sire Firestreak (GB) 1956	Hot Spell (GB); 1944	Haymaker	Festuca
Dam Snow Blossom (GB) 1957	Flush Royal (FR); 1945	Majano	Deiri
Dam Snow Blossom (GB) 1957	Flush Royal (FR); 1945	Majano	Madgi Moto
Dam Snow Blossom (GB) 1957	Flush Royal (FR); 1945	Altamira	Olibrius
Dam Snow Blossom (GB) 1957	Flush Royal (FR); 1945	Altamira	Koenigsmark
Dam Snow Blossom (GB) 1957	Ariana (FR); 1951	Tehran	Bois Roussel
Dam Snow Blossom (GB) 1957	Ariana (FR); 1951	Tehran	Stafaralla
Dam Snow Blossom (GB) 1957	Ariana (FR); 1951	Snowberry	Cameronian
Dam Snow Blossom (GB) 1957	Ariana (FR); 1951	Snowberry	Myrobella (Family: 6-e)
