= Nomadic Way =

American-bred Thoroughbred racehorse

- Sire: Assert
- Grandsire: Be My Guest
- Dam: Kittyhawk
- Damsire: Bustino
- Sex: Stallion
- Foaled: 3 March 1985
- Country: United States
- Colour: Bay
- Breeder: Swettenham Stud
- Owner: Robert Sangster
- Trainer: Barry Hills
- Record: 39: 10-13-6; 19: 6-3-3 (Flat); 20: 4-10-3 (National Hunt)
- Earnings: £286,228

Major wins
- Cesarewitch Handicap (1988); Irish Champion Hurdle (1990); Stayers' Hurdle (1992)

Nomadic Way (3 March 1985 – May 2012) was an American-bred, British-trained Thoroughbred racehorse and sire. He was a successful stayer on the flat and was a top class hurdler under National Hunt rules, switching between the two codes in a racing career which lasted from October 1987 until January 1993.

Racing on the flat, he won the Cesarewitch Handicap, finished second in the Chester Cup and the Queen Alexandra Stakes and took fourth place in the Ascot Gold Cup. When campaigned over hurdles he won the Irish Champion Hurdle in 1990 and the Stayers' Hurdle in 1992 and twice finished second in the Champion Hurdle. He also finished second in the Bula Hurdle (twice), the Fighting Fifth Hurdle and the Aintree Hurdle.

At the end of his racing career he was retired to stud and sired some good steeplechasers. He died in 2012 at the age of twenty-seven.

== Background ==
Nomadic Way was a small bay horse with a white star and a white sock on his left hind leg, bred in Kentucky by his owner, Robert Sangster's Swettenham Stud. He was from the second crop of foals sired by Assert, who won the Prix du Jockey Club, Irish Derby, Benson & Hedges Gold Cup and Joe McGrath Memorial Stakes in 1982. Assert other good winners including Dancehall (Grand Prix de Paris), Timely Assertion (Santa Anita Oaks), All My Dreams (Deutsches Derby) and Running Flame (Hollywood Turf Cup). Nomadic Way's dam Kittyhawk was a high-class racemare who won the Lowther Stakes in 1981 and the Park Stakes in 1982. Kittyhawk's dam Sky Fever is also the female-line ancestor of the leading French filly Golden Lilac.

Sangster sent the horse to Europe where he was trained throughout his racing career by Barry Hills at Lambourn. Nomadic Way usually raced in blinkers. Unlike most National Hunt horses, he was never gelded.

== Racing career ==
=== 1987 & 1988: Early flat racing career ===
Nomadic Way made his only appearance as a two-year-old when finishing ninth in a sixteen-runner maiden race over one mile at Warwick Racecourse in October. In their annual Racehorses of 1987, Timeform commented that he was "sure to improve".

In 1988, Nomadic Way finished fourth two in maiden races over 11 1/2 furlongs at Bath Racecourse before being moved up in distance. At Beverley Racecourse on 14 June, ridden by Richard Hills, he recorded his first success in a two-mile handicap race, winning by three lengths. Richard Hills' twin brother Michael then took over the ride and partnered the horse when he followed up with further victories at Chester on 22 June and Newbury six days later. After being beaten in his next three races, Nomadic Way returned to winning form at Haydock Park Racecourse in September, winning a handicap over two miles and three furlongs by eight lengths.

On 15 October Nomadic Way was one of twenty-four runners for the 148th running of the Cesarewitch Handicap over 2 1/4 miles at Newmarket Racecourse. Ridden by Willie Carson and carrying 107 pounds he started the 6/1 joint-favourite alongside the Guy Harwood-trained Zero Watt. Carson sent the colt into the lead three furlongs from the finish and he stayed on well in the closing stages to win by a neck from the lightly weighted four-year-old Double Dutch.

=== 1988/1989 National Hunt season: novice hurdle races ===
Three weeks after his win in the Cesarewitch, Nomadic Way made his National Hunt debut in a Novice hurdle at Sandown Park Racecourse. He won by four lengths from Rowlandsons Gems and followed up by winning the Aurelius Hurdle at Ascot two weeks later. When moved up in class for the Listed Placepot Hurdle at Kempton in February he finished second, eight lengths behind Royal Derbi and five lengths clear of the favourite Magnus Pym. On his first appearance at the Cheltenham Festival Nomadic Way was one of 27 four-year-olds to contest the Triumph Hurdle on 16 March. Starting the 11/2 joint-favourite alongside the Finale Junior Hurdle winner Enemy Action, he finished eighth behind the 66/1 outsider Ikdam who won by 1 1/2 lengths from Highland Bud.

=== 1989 Flat season ===
Nomadic Way returned to the flat a month after his run at Cheltenham and won a handicap race over 1 3/4 miles at Newmarket, taking the lead inside the final furlong and beating Stratford Ponds by half a length. Two weeks later at the same course he finished second to Arizelos in a two-mile handicap. At Royal Ascot in June he was moved up in class for the Group One Ascot Gold Cup over 2 1/2 miles and stayed on in the straight to finish fourth behind Sadeem. In his two remaining races that season he finished sixth when joint-favourite for a handicap at Newmarket in July and third (returning after a three-month break) in the Listed George Stubbs Stakes on 3 November.

=== 1989/1990 National Hunt season ===
In the 1989/1990 National Hunt season, Nomadic Way began to compete against more experienced hurdlers, beginning his campaign by finishing third behind Cruising Altitude and Morley Street in the Gerry Feilden Hurdle at Newbury on 25 November. On his next appearance, in the Bula Hurdle, Nomadic Way was beaten a head by Cruising Altitude, with the reigning Champion Hurdler Beech Road in third ahead of Floyd. The horse was then sent to Ireland where he contested the Irish Champion Hurdle over two miles at Leopardstown Racecourse on 10 February. Ridden by Brendan Powell, he started the 3/1 second favourite behind the Jim Bolger-trained Elementary, and recorded his biggest win over obstacles up to that time, beating Elementary by six lengths.

On 13 March at the Cheltenham Festival, Nomadic Way ridden by Peter Scudamore, started 8/1 third favourite behind Beech Road and Kribensis for the 61st running of the Champion Hurdle. The other contenders included Morley Street, Cruising Altitude, Elementary, Deep Sensation and See You Then. Nomadic Way raced in second behind the 150/1 outsider Sudden Victory before taking the lead at the fifth hurdle. He maintained his advantage until the final flight where he was overtaken by Kribensis but stayed on in the closing stages to finish second, three lengths behind Kribensis and three quarters of a length ahead of Past Glories. In April Nomadic Way was sent to the United States to contest the Dueling Grounds International at Kentucky Downs where he finished sixth behind the Irish mare Grabel.

=== 1990/1991 National Hunt season ===
Nomadic Way was off the course for more than nine months before returning in February 1991 to attempt to repeat his 1990 success in the Irish Champion Hurdle. Ridden by Scudamore, he started 11/10 favourite but was beaten three lengths by the four-year-old Nordic Surprise with the Galway Hurdle winner Athy Spirit in third. He then started odds-on favourite at Haydock on 1 March but finished third behind Sondrio and Riverhead, conceding eight pounds to the first two. Eleven days later Nomadic way made his second bid to win the Champion Hurdle and started 9/1 fourth favourite behind Morley Street, Beech Road and the Christmas Hurdle winner Fidway. Ridden by Richard Dunwoody, he led over the first two hurdles and remained in contention before staying on in the closing stages to finish second again, 1 1/2 lengths behind Morley Street and a head in front of Ruling. The other beaten horses included Mole Board, Bradbury Star, Wonder Man, Royal Derbi, Deep Sensation, Athy Spirit, Riverhead, Sondrio and Sybillin. Four weeks later, Nomadic Way faced Morley Street again in the Aintree Hurdle over 2 1/2 miles. He took the lead three hurdles out but was overtaken by his rival at the final flight and was beaten into second place by six lengths.

=== 1991 Flat season ===
Nomadic Way returned to the flat for a final time in 1991 and ran in three more races. After finishing fourth in a two-mile handicap at Newmarket in April he carried 138 pounds in the Chester Cup on 8 May. Ridden by Pat Eddery he was sixth on the final turn and finished well to take second place, 1 1/2 lengths behind Star Player, a five-year-old to whom he was conceding sixteen pounds. At Royal Ascot in June he was again ridden by Eddery when he started 2/1 favourite for the two and three quarter mile Queen Alexandra Stakes. After tracking the leaders he took the lead in the straight but was quickly overtaken and beaten seven lengths by the Jim Bolger-trained four-year-old Easy To Please.

=== 1991/1992 National Hunt season ===
On 23 November 1991, Nomadic Way was matched against Sybillin, Royal Derbi and Sybillin in the Fighting Fifth Hurdle over two miles at Newcastle Racecourse. He recovered from being badly hampered on the final turn to finish second, a neck behind the winner Royal Derbi. In the Bula Hurdle at Cheltenham on 7 December he again finished a neck second to Royal Derbi, with Ruling, Fidway and Oh So Risky in third, fourth and fifth. Twenty-four days later Nomadic Way was moved up in distance to contest the Spa Hurdle over 2 1/2 miles at Cheltenham. He started the 8/13 favourite and took the lead at the second last but was aoutpaced in the closing stages and finished third behind Cab On Target and Winnie The Witch.

On 10 March 1993, Nomadic Way appeared for the fourth time at the Cheltenham Festival when he was one of seventeen horses to contest the twenty-first running of the Stayers' Hurdle over three miles and a furlong. Ridden by Jamie Osborne, he started the 15/2 fourth choice in the betting behind the 1990 winner Trapper John, and the Sun Alliance Novices' Hurdle winners Crystal Spirit and Forest Sun. The other runners included Rustle (winner of the race in 1989), Ubu III (Grande Course de Haies d'Auteuil), Tyrone Bridge (Challow Novices' Hurdle) and Derring Valley (Sefton Novices' Hurdle). Osborne settled the horse just behind the leaders as the field stayed closely grouped on the first circuit. At the tenth hurdle (four from the finish), he moved up on the inside to dispute the lead with Crystal Spirit and the pair raced together until Nomadic Way opened up a clear advantage at the final hurdle. He stayed on strongly up the run-in to win by 3 1/2 lengths from Ubu III and the subsequently disqualified Trapper John with Crystal Spirit in fourth place. Osborne described the race as "a steering job".

=== 1992/1993 National Hunt season ===
Nomadic Way remained in training for the 1992/1993 National Hunt season but failed to win in three races. On 31 October at Wetherby Racecourse he started favourite for the West Yorkshire Hurdle but finished second of the eight runners, beaten five lengths by Burgoyne, to whom he was conceding seven pounds. He started favourite again for the Grade 2 Long Distance Hurdle at Newbury but finished tailed-off in last place in a race won by Tyrone Bridge. In January Nomadic Way ran his final race in the Group 1 Wyko Power Transmission Hurdle at Cheltenham in which he finished second to Muse.

== Stud record ==
At the end of his racing career, Nomadic Way was retired to become a National Hunt stallion at the Louella stud in Leicestershire. The most successful of his offspring included Buckby Lane (Ladbrokes Trophy Chase) and Himalayan Trail (Midlands Grand National).

Nomadic Way died in May 2012 at the age of twenty-seven. Barry Hills called him "a lovely horse who was not over-big but very tough and he stayed really well. His win in the Stayers' gave me as much pleasure as any winner I had".

== Pedigree ==
Pedigree of Nomadic Way (USA), bay stallion, 1985
Sire Assert (IRE) 1979	Be My Guest (USA); 1974	Northern Dancer	Nearctic
Sire Assert (IRE) 1979	Be My Guest (USA); 1974	Northern Dancer	Natalma
Sire Assert (IRE) 1979	Be My Guest (USA); 1974	What A Treat	Tudor Minstrel
Sire Assert (IRE) 1979	Be My Guest (USA); 1974	What A Treat	Rare Treat
Sire Assert (IRE) 1979	Irish Bird (USA); 1970	Sea Bird	Dan Cupid
Sire Assert (IRE) 1979	Irish Bird (USA); 1970	Sea Bird	Sicalade
Sire Assert (IRE) 1979	Irish Bird (USA); 1970	Irish Lass	Sayajirao
Sire Assert (IRE) 1979	Irish Bird (USA); 1970	Irish Lass	Scollata
Dam Kittyhawk (GB) 1978	Bustino (GB); 1971	Busted	Crepello
Dam Kittyhawk (GB) 1978	Bustino (GB); 1971	Busted	Sans le Sou
Dam Kittyhawk (GB) 1978	Bustino (GB); 1971	Ship Yard	Doutelle
Dam Kittyhawk (GB) 1978	Bustino (GB); 1971	Ship Yard	Paving Stone
Dam Kittyhawk (GB) 1978	Sky Fever (GB); 1969	Skymaster	Golden Cloud
Dam Kittyhawk (GB) 1978	Sky Fever (GB); 1969	Skymaster	Discipliner
Dam Kittyhawk (GB) 1978	Sky Fever (GB); 1969	Harlequinade	Klairon
Dam Kittyhawk (GB) 1978	Sky Fever (GB); 1969	Harlequinade	Columbine (Family 1-e)
