= Golden Fleece (horse) =

American-bred, Irish-trained Thoroughbred racehorse (1979–1984)

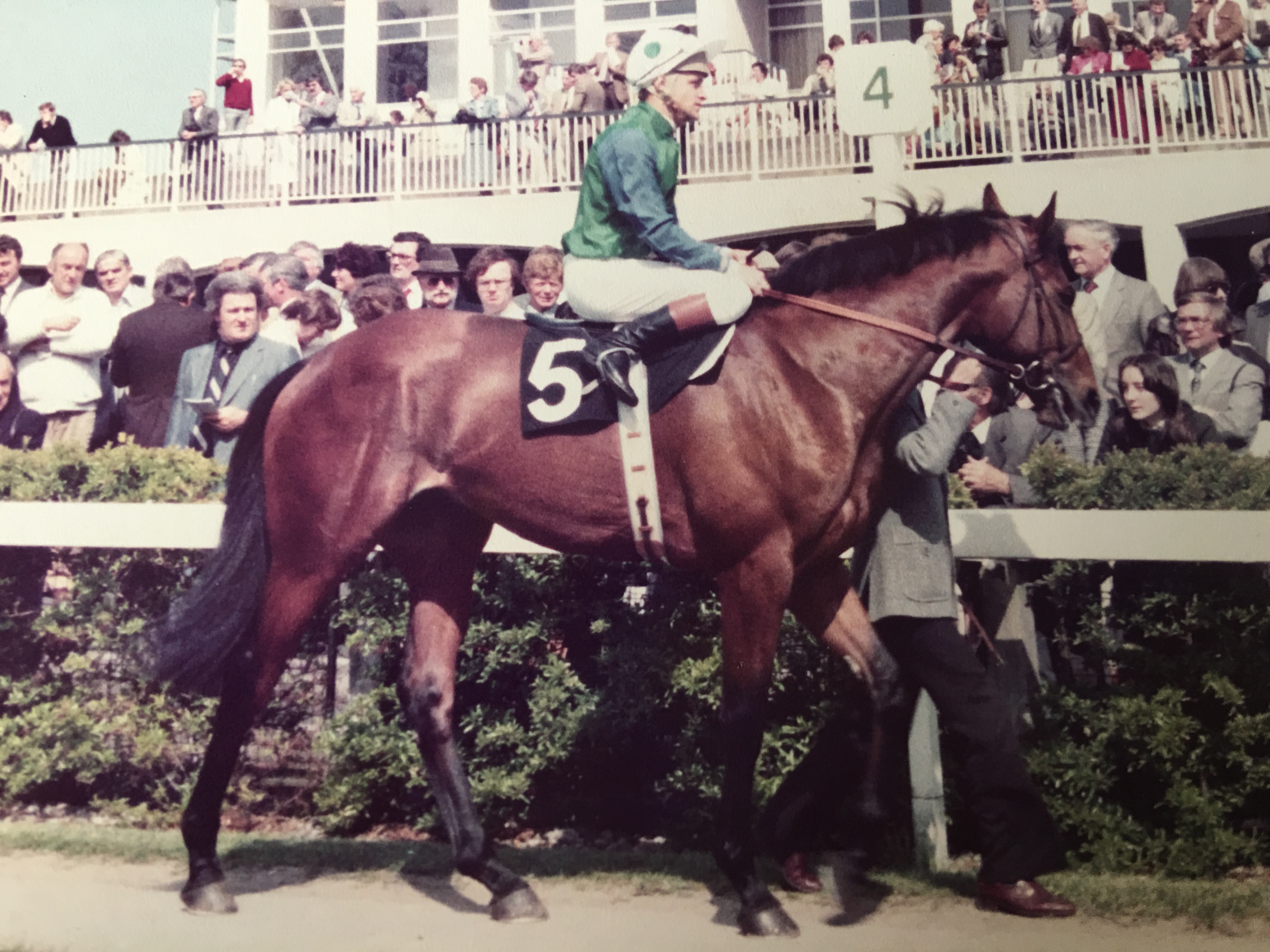
- Golden Fleece and Pat Eddery at Leopardstown, May 1982
- Sire: Nijinsky
- Grandsire: Northern Dancer
- Dam: Exotic Treat
- Damsire: Vaguely Noble
- Sex: Stallion
- Foaled: 1 April 1979
- Country: United States
- Colour: Bay
- Breeder: Mr & Mrs Paul Hexter
- Owner: Robert Sangster
- Trainer: Vincent O'Brien
- Record: 4: 4-0-0
- Earnings: $283,967

Major wins
- Nijinsky Stakes (1982); Ballymoss Stakes (1982); Epsom Derby (1982)

Awards
- Top-rated European racehorse (1982); Timeform rating: 133
- Last updated on 16 November 2022

Golden Fleece (1 April 1979– 18 March 1984) was an American-bred, Irish-trained champion Thoroughbred race horse. In a career which consisted of only four races, he was undefeated, with his most notable success coming on his final racecourse appearance in the 1982 Epsom Derby. In that race he recorded the fastest winning time since before WWII. Sent to stud, the horse contracted stomach cancer and died in March 1984 after only one year's stud duty.

== Background ==
Golden Fleece was a big, heavily built bay horse bred in the United States by Mr and Mrs Paul Hexter. He was foaled and raised at Hilary J. Boone's Wimbledon Farm in Fayette County, Kentucky. As a yearling, the horse was bought for $775,000 by Robert Sangster. He was sent to Ireland to be trained by Vincent O'Brien at Ballydoyle.

Golden Fleece was sired by Nijinsky, the Canadian-bred winner of the English Triple Crown in 1970 who went on to become a very important stallion. Golden Fleece's dam, Exotic Treat, was a half-sister to What A Treat, the dam of leading miler and champion sire, Be My Guest.

== Racing career ==
Golden Fleece's first race was in September 1981 when he contested a one-mile maiden race at Leopardstown. Ridden by Pat Eddery, he took the lead in the straight and won decisively from Assert. Golden Fleece did not race again in 1981, but his form was boosted when Assert won the Beresford Stakes by four lengths.

In the spring of 1982, Golden Fleece established himself as a leading contender for the Derby by winning the Ballymoss Stakes, beating older horses including the future Royal Ascot Prince of Wales's Stakes and Japan Cup winner Stanerra, at the Curragh. In the Nijinsky Stakes at Leopardstown, he again beat Assert. This form proved very strong when Assert subsequently won the French Derby, Irish Derby and the Benson and Hedges Gold Cup. Golden Fleece's participation in the Derby was briefly put in doubt by a minor training injury, but he made a quick recovery.

In the Derby, Golden Fleece started 3/1 favourite in a field of eighteen runners. His task was made slightly easier by the late withdrawal of his main rival in the betting, the Henry Cecil-trained Simply Great. Ridden by Eddery, Golden Fleece was held towards the back of the field on the turn into the straight. He was then switched to the outside, made rapid progress, took the lead a furlong out and won by three lengths. Again, the form would be franked, as the runner-up Touching Wood won the St Leger and Irish St. Leger. The Derby third, Silver Hawk, also produced good form.

Golden Fleece's winning time of 2:34.27 was the fastest for almost fifty years. After the race, Eddery called the winner "the best horse I have ever sat on".

Golden Fleece had training problems after his win at Epsom and was retired to stud without racing again.

== Assessment ==
In 1981, Golden Fleece was given a rating of 99 by the independent Timeform organisation. In the following year, Golden Fleece was given a rating of 133 by Timeform, placing him fourth behind Ardross, Assert and Green Forest. The official International Classification, however, rated him the best European racehorse of the year, a pound ahead of Assert and Kalaglow. Pat Eddery, who later rode such champions as Dancing Brave, El Gran Senor and Pebbles, maintained that Golden Fleece was the best horse he had ever ridden.

In their book A Century of Champions, John Randall and Tony Morris rated Golden Fleece as an "average" Derby winner and the seventeenth best Irish racehorse of the 20th century.

== Stud record ==
Golden Fleece stood at the Coolmore Stud, Ireland for just one season. He died from complications after intestinal cancer surgery in March 1984.

== Pedigree ==
Pedigree of Golden Fleece (USA), bay stallion, 1979
Sire Nijinsky (CAN) 1967	Northern Dancer; 1961	Nearctic	Nearco
Sire Nijinsky (CAN) 1967	Northern Dancer; 1961	Nearctic	Lady Angela
Sire Nijinsky (CAN) 1967	Northern Dancer; 1961	Natalma	Native Dancer
Sire Nijinsky (CAN) 1967	Northern Dancer; 1961	Natalma	Almahmoud
Sire Nijinsky (CAN) 1967	Flaming Page; 1959	Bull Page	Bull Lea
Sire Nijinsky (CAN) 1967	Flaming Page; 1959	Bull Page	Our Page
Sire Nijinsky (CAN) 1967	Flaming Page; 1959	Flaring Top	Menow
Sire Nijinsky (CAN) 1967	Flaming Page; 1959	Flaring Top	Flaming Top
Dam Exotic Treat (USA) 1971	Vaguely Noble; 1965	Vienna	Aureole
Dam Exotic Treat (USA) 1971	Vaguely Noble; 1965	Vienna	Turkish Blood
Dam Exotic Treat (USA) 1971	Vaguely Noble; 1965	Noble Lassie	Nearco
Dam Exotic Treat (USA) 1971	Vaguely Noble; 1965	Noble Lassie	Belle Sauvage
Dam Exotic Treat (USA) 1971	Rare Treat; 1952	Stymie	Equestrian
Dam Exotic Treat (USA) 1971	Rare Treat; 1952	Stymie	Stop Watch
Dam Exotic Treat (USA) 1971	Rare Treat; 1952	Rare Perfume	Eight Thirty
Dam Exotic Treat (USA) 1971	Rare Treat; 1952	Rare Perfume	Fragrance

== See also ==
- List of Undefeated horses
- 1982 Epsom Derby
- Golden Fleece|Champion Racehorse 1982
