= 1983 Kentucky Derby =

Horse race

109th Kentucky Derby
- Kentucky Derby
- Grade I stakes race
- Location: Churchill Downs
- Date: May 7, 1983
- Winning horse: Sunny's Halo
- Jockey: Eddie Delahoussaye
- Trainer: David C. Cross Jr.
- Owner: D.J. Foster Racing Stable
- Conditions: Fast
- Surface: Dirt
- Attendance: 134,444

The 1983 Kentucky Derby was the 109th running of the Kentucky Derby. The race took place on May 7, 1983, with 134,444 people in attendance.

== Full results ==
Finished	Post	Program	Horse	Jockey	Trainer	Owner	Time / behind
1st	10	8	Sunny's Halo	Eddie Delahoussaye	David C. Cross Jr.	D.J. Foster Racing Stable	2:02 1/5
2nd	5	6	Desert Wine	Chris McCarron	Jerry M. Fanning	Cardiff Stud Farm	
3rd	20	2B	Caveat	Laffit Pincay Jr.	Woody Stephens	August Belmont IV	
4th	1	4	Slew o' Gold	Angel Cordero Jr.	John O. Hertler	Equusequity Stable	
5th	18	1X	Marfa	Jorge Velásquez	D. Wayne Lukas	Robert French, Barry Beal, D. W. Lukas	
6th	2	5	Play Fellow	Jean Cruguet	Harvey L. Vanier	Dr. Carl Lauer, Robert Victor, Nancy Vanier	
7th	14	11	Pax In Bello	Jeffrey Fell	Steven T. Jerkens	Mrs. Arnold A. Wilcox	
8th	7	7	Country Pine	Mike Venezia	Lou Rondinello	Daniel Galbreath	
9th	3	1	Balboa Native	Sandy Hawley	D. Wayne Lukas	Robert H. Spreen	
10th	16	15	Paris Prince	Terry Lipham	Lazaro S. Barrera	Dolly Green	
11th	12	9	Current Hope	Alex Solis	Roger Laurin	Howard Kaskel and Bob Baker	
12th	4	2	Chumming	Eddie Maple	Woody Stephens	Hickory Tree Stable	
13th	8	3	Freezing Rain	William Gavidia	Anthony L. Basile	Bwamazon Farm	
14th	15	14	My Mac	Don MacBeth	Newcomb Green	Aronow Stable (Donald J. Aronow)	
15th	11	13	Explosive Wagon	Charles Mueller	Gene C. Norman	Peggy McReynolds	
16th	13	10	Parfaitement	Herb McCauley	J. William Boniface	Black Gates Stable	
17th	19	3C	Highland Park	Donald Brumfield	Anthony L. Basile	Bwamazon Farm	
18th	17	16	Luv A Libra	Julio C. Espinoza	Heliodoro Gustines	Vivianne De Costa and Stanley Yagoda	
19th	6	12	Law Talk	Carlos H. Marquez Jr.	Leonard Imperio	Buckram Oak Farm (Mahmoud Fustok)	
20th	9	1A	Total Departure	Pat Valenzuela	D. Wayne Lukas	Rebalot Stable	

- Winning breeder: David J. Foster (ON)
