= Assert (horse) =

Irish-bred Thoroughbred racehorse (1979–1995)

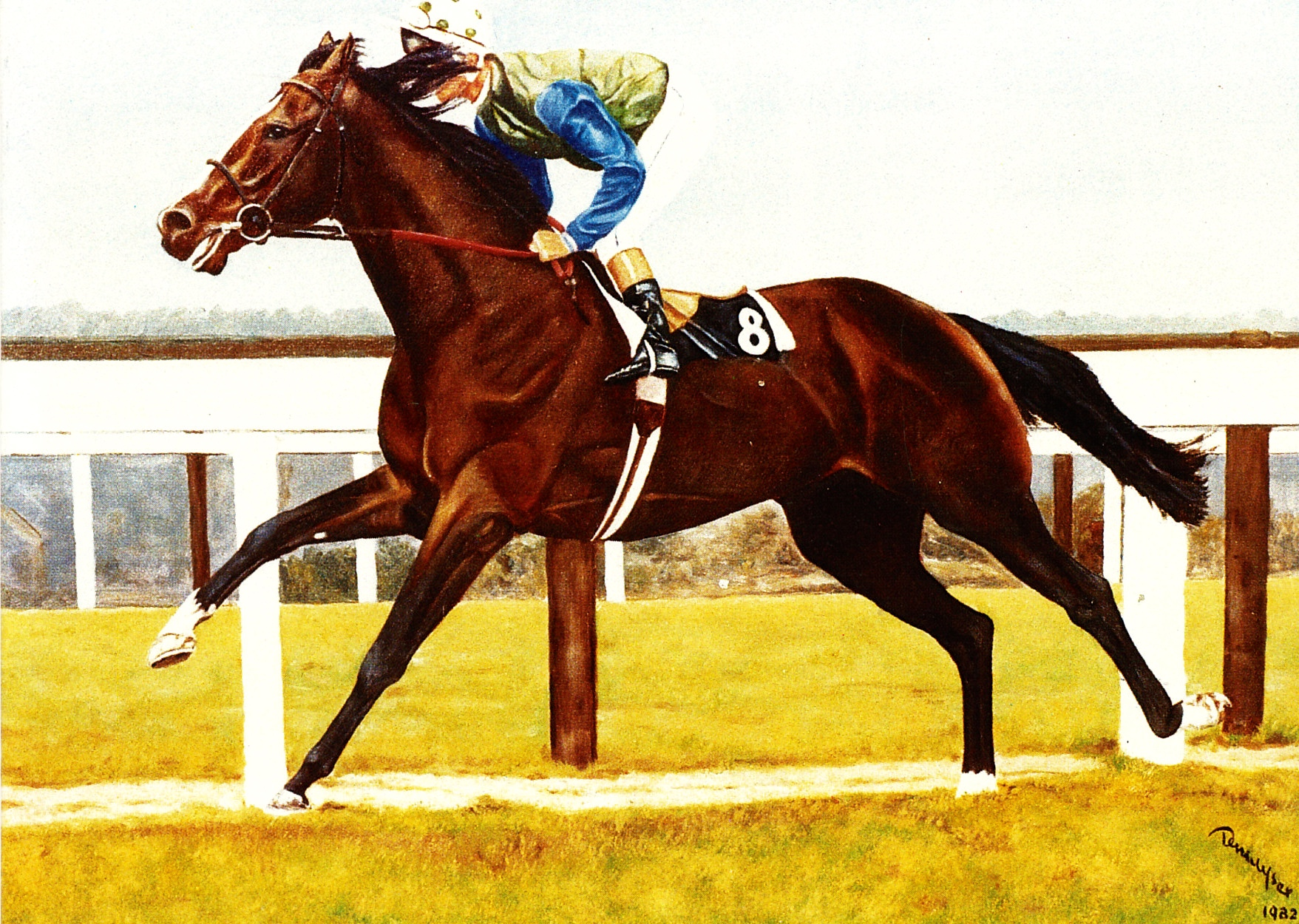
- Assert, oil on canvas Painting by Bob Demuyser (1920–2003)
- Sire: Be My Guest
- Grandsire: Northern Dancer
- Dam: Irish Bird
- Damsire: Sea Bird
- Sex: Stallion
- Foaled: 17 April 1979
- Country: Ireland
- Colour: Bay
- Breeder: Moyglare Stud
- Owner: Robert Sangster
- Trainer: David O'Brien
- Record: 11: 6-3-0
- Earnings: $612,317

Major wins
- Beresford Stakes (1981); Gallinule Stakes (1982); French Derby (1982); Irish Derby (1982); Benson & Hedges Gold Cup (1982); Joe McGrath Memorial Stakes (1982)

Awards
- Timeform rating 134; Timeform Best Middle-distance Horse (1982)
- Last updated on 16 November 2022

Assert (17 April 1979 – 14 September 1995) was an Irish Thoroughbred racehorse and sire. As a two-year-old he was beaten by Golden Fleece on his debut but went on to win the Beresford Stakes. In the following year he won four Group One races: the French Derby, Irish Derby, Benson & Hedges Gold Cup and Joe McGrath Memorial Stakes. He was rated the best middle-distance horse in Europe in 1982 by Timeform. He was retired to stud at the end of his three-year-old season and became a successful sire of winners.

== Background ==
Assert was a bay horse with a white blaze and three socks bred in Ireland by the Moyglare Stud. He was from the first crop of foals sired by Be My Guest, an American-bred stallion who won the Waterford Crystal Mile when trained in Ireland by Vincent O'Brien. Be My Guest's other offspring included On The House, Pentire Go and Go and Luth Enchantee. Assert's dam Irish Bird, was a half-sister of Irish Ball, a colt who finished third in the Epsom Derby before winning the Irish Derby in 1971. A year before foaling Assert, Irish Bird had produced Bikala, who won the Prix du Jockey-Club 1981. Another of her foals was Eurobird, a filly who won the Irish St. Leger.

As a yearling Assert was sent to the ales in France and was bought for 160,000 francs (approximately £16,000) and entered the ownership of Robert Sangster. He was trained throughout his racing career by David O'Brien.

== Racing career ==
=== 1981: two-year-old season ===
Assert made his racecourse debut in a maiden race over one mile at Leopardstown Racecourse in September. He showed his inexperience (ran "very green") but finished second behind the impressive winner Golden Fleece. Three weeks later he was (theoretically at least) moved up in class for the Group Three Beresford Stakes over a mile at the Curragh. Ridden by Christy Roche, he took the lead early in the straight and won easily by four lengths from the odds-on favourite Longleat. On his final appearance of the year, Assert was sent to England for the Group One William Hill Futurity at Doncaster Racecourse. He started third favourite but finished eighth of the thirteen runners behind Count Pahlen.

=== 1982: three-year-old season ===
Assert began his three-year-old season in the Nijinsky Stakes over ten furlongs in May in which he again finished second to Golden Fleece. Two weeks later, Assert was moved up in distance for the Gallinule Stakes over 1 1/2 miles at the Curragh and recorded a wide-margin victory over Rivellino.

Golden Fleece was Sangster's representative in the Epsom Derby and so Assert was sent to contest the French equivalent, the Prix du Jockey Club over 2400 m at Chantilly Racecourse four days later. Starting the 2.2/1 favourite he took the lead from Real Shadai in the straight and pulled clear to win by three lengths. He was the first foreign trained-horse to win the race since its inception in 1836. Three weeks later, Assert started 4/7 favourite for the Irish Derby at the Curragh, with the American-bred, British-trained Silver Hawk appearing to provide his only serious opposition. Assert took the lead and quickly went clear of the field to win very easily from Silver Hawk by a margin officially recorded as eight lengths (Timeform made it ten lengths). Assert became the first horse to win both the Prix du Jockey Club and Irish Derby.

Assert was then matched against older horses for the first time in Britain's most prestigious weight-for-age race, the King George VI and Queen Elizabeth Stakes over 1 1/2 miles at Ascot Racecourse on 24 July. He started the 10/11 favourite ahead of his half-brother Bikala who had beaten a strong field in the Prix Ganay on his previous start. The other main contenders were Kalaglow, Height of Fashion and Glint of Gold. Assert went past Bikala on the turn into the straight and held off a strong challenge from Glint of Gold, but was caught inside the final furlong and beaten a neck by Kalaglow. On 17 August Assert was ridden by Pat Eddery in the eleventh running of the Benson and Hedges Gold Cup over 10 1/2 furlongs at York Racecourse. Starting the 4/5 favourite against six British-trained opponents, he took the lead from the start and pulled clear in the straight vo win easily by six lengths from Norwick. A month later, Assert started the 1/4 favourite for the Joe McGrath Memorial Stakes over ten furlongs. With Roche back in the saddle, he went eight lengths clear in the straight before being eased down to win by three lengths from Kind of Hush. Timeform described the race as being "little more than an exercise gallop" for the winner. On 3 October, Assert started 5/2 favourite for the Prix de l'Arc de Triomphe on very soft ground at Longchamp Racecourse. He was well-positioned turning into the straight but dropped away in the closing stage and finished eleventh of the seventeen runners behind Akiyda.

== Assessment ==
In 1981, Assert was given a rating of 113 by the independent Timeform organisation, nineteen pounds below their top-rated two-year-old colt Wind and Wuthering. In the official International Classification he was rated thirteen pounds behind the top-rated Green Forest. In the following season he was rated the second-best three-year-old in Europe (and the joint-second-best horse of any age) behind Golden Fleece. Timeform rated him on 134, a pound ahead of Golden Fleece and level with Ardross and Green Forest as the best horse of the year. He was also named the year's best middle-distance horse by Timeform.

== Stud record ==
At the end of his three-year-old season, Assert was syndicated with an estimated value of $25,000,000 and sent to North America to become a breeding stallion at the Windfield Farm in Maryland. He sired many good winners, including Dancehall (Grand Prix de Paris), Lecroix (Union-Rennen), Tzar Rodney (Prix La Force), Timely Assertion (Santa Anita Oaks), Square Cut (San Luis Obispo Handicap), All My Dreams (Deutsches Derby), Betty Lobelia (Miss Grillo Stakes), Nomadic Way (Stayers' Hurdle, Cesarewitch Handicap, Irish Champion Hurdle) and Running Flame (Hollywood Turf Cup).

Assert died in Sicily on 14 September 1995, aged 16.

== Pedigree ==
Pedigree of Assert (IRE), bay stallion, 1979
Sire Be My Guest (USA) 1974	Northern Dancer (CAN); 1961	Nearctic	Nearco
Sire Be My Guest (USA) 1974	Northern Dancer (CAN); 1961	Nearctic	Lady Angela
Sire Be My Guest (USA) 1974	Northern Dancer (CAN); 1961	Natalma	Native Dancer
Sire Be My Guest (USA) 1974	Northern Dancer (CAN); 1961	Natalma	Almahmoud
Sire Be My Guest (USA) 1974	What a Treat (USA); 1962	Tudor Minstrel	Owen Tudor
Sire Be My Guest (USA) 1974	What a Treat (USA); 1962	Tudor Minstrel	Sansonnet
Sire Be My Guest (USA) 1974	What a Treat (USA); 1962	Rare Treat	Stymie
Sire Be My Guest (USA) 1974	What a Treat (USA); 1962	Rare Treat	Rare Perfume
Dam Irish Bird (USA) 1970	Sea Bird (FR); 1962	Dan Cupid	Native Dancer
Dam Irish Bird (USA) 1970	Sea Bird (FR); 1962	Dan Cupid	Vixenette
Dam Irish Bird (USA) 1970	Sea Bird (FR); 1962	Sicalade	Sicambre
Dam Irish Bird (USA) 1970	Sea Bird (FR); 1962	Sicalade	Marmelade
Dam Irish Bird (USA) 1970	Irish Lass (GB); 1962	Sayajirao	Nearco
Dam Irish Bird (USA) 1970	Irish Lass (GB); 1962	Sayajirao	Rosy Legend
Dam Irish Bird (USA) 1970	Irish Lass (GB); 1962	Scollata	Niccolo Dell'arca
Dam Irish Bird (USA) 1970	Irish Lass (GB); 1962	Scollata	Cutaway (Family: 8-c)

- Assert was inbred 4 × 4 to Nearco, meaning that this stallion appears twice in the fourth generation of his pedigree.
