= August Belmont IV =

Racehorse owner

- Born: December 30, 1908; New York City, U.S.
- Died: July 10, 1995 (aged 86); Easton, Maryland, U.S.
- Education: Harvard University
- Occupations: Investment banker, Racehorse owner
- Board member of: Dillon, Read & Co. The Jockey Club; American Museum of Natural History; New York-Presbyterian Hospital; American Kennel Club
- Spouses: Elizabeth Lee Saltonstall; Louise Vietor Winston
- Children: 4

August Belmont IV (December 30, 1908 – July 10, 1995) was an American investment banker and thoroughbred racehorse owner.

== Biography ==
He was born on December 30, 1908, to August Belmont III (1882–1919) and Alice W. de Goicouria, he was a fourth generation banker and racehorse owner.

While a nineteen-year-old student he inherited Belcourt Castle in Newport, Rhode Island, from his uncle, Oliver Belmont. However, he did not keep the property and it was transferred to another uncle, Perry Belmont. A graduate of Harvard University, in 1931 August Belmont IV went to work for the securities firm of Bonbright & Co. and remained in the industry for the rest of his working life. In the latter part of the 1940s he was hired by close friend Douglas Dillon to work for Dillon, Read & Co. Belmont became a partner in the investment banking firm and served as its president from 1962 until his retirement in 1971.

He was first married in 1931 to Elizabeth Lee Saltonstall of Boston with whom he had four children. They divorced in 1946 and he married Mrs. Louise Vietor Winston.

In 1982, August Belmont IV became chairman of The Jockey Club.

A resident of Syosset on Long Island, New York, following his retirement from banking August Belmont IV made his home in Easton, Maryland, where he died in 1995 at age eighty-six.

== Racing ==
August Belmont IV followed a family tradition by becoming active as a racehorse owner. However, his involvement was to a far lesser extent than his grandfather, August Belmont Jr., founder of Belmont Park, and his great-grandfather, August Belmont, for whom the third leg of the U.S. Triple Crown series, the Belmont Stakes is named. Among his stakes race winners he owned alone or in partnerships were Dew Line, Heed, Quadratic, and Caveat with whom he won the 1983 Belmont Stakes.
