= Awaasif =

Canadian-bred Thoroughbred racehorse

- Racing silks of Sheikh Mohammed
- Sire: Snow Knight
- Grandsire: Firestreak
- Dam: Royal Statute
- Damsire: Northern Dancer
- Sex: Mare
- Foaled: 27 April 1979
- Country: Canada
- Colour: Bay
- Breeder: E. P. Taylor
- Owner: Sheikh Mohammed
- Trainer: John Dunlop
- Record: 14:4-4-1

Major wins
- Yorkshire Oaks (1982); Gran Premio del Jockey Club (1983)

Awards
- Top-rated British-trained three-year-old (1982); Timeform rating: 78P (1981), 130 (1982), 127 (1983)

Awaasif (27 April 1979 – May 2004) was a Canadian-bred, British-trained Thoroughbred racehorse and broodmare. After winning once as a two-year-old in 1981, she emerged as a top-class middle-distance runner in the following season, when she was officially the best British three-year-old of either sex. She showed useful form in the early part of the season and finished fourth in the Oaks Stakes. After recovering from illness she defeated a strong field in the Yorkshire Oaks and then ran a close third in the Prix de l'Arc de Triomphe. As a four-year-old she overcame training problems to record an impressive win in the Gran Premio del Jockey Club. As a broodmare she produced several winners, most notable Snow Bride, who won the Oaks and was herself the dam of the undefeated Epsom Derby winner Lammtarra.

== Background ==
Awaasif was a bay mare with a white star and three white socks bred at the Windfields Farm in Ontario by E. P. Taylor. She was one of the best horses sired by Snow Knight, who won the 1974 Epsom Derby and went on to be named American Champion Turf Horse in 1975. Awaasif' dam Royal Statute had previously produced several winners including Konafa, who finished second in the 1976 1000 Guineas and Akureyri the winner of the Fountain of Youth Stakes. Konafa went on to produce Korveya, the dam of Bosra Sham and Hector Protector while another of Royal Statute's daughters, Victoress was the grand-dam of Pour Moi.

As a yearling Awaasif was offered for sale and bought for $325,000 by representatives of Sheikh Mohammed. The filly was sent to race in Europe and was trained throughout her career by John Dunlop at Arundel in West Sussex.

== Racing career ==
=== 1981: two-year-old season ===
Awaasif made her racecourse debut in the St Catherine's Stakes over six furlongs at Newbury Racecourse in July, when she finished of the twelve runners behind Bless the Match. In September she contested a seven furlong maiden race at Ayr Racecourse and won by two lengths from fourteen opponents. In Timeform's Racehorses of 1981 she was described as "a fine individual who should improve considerably on her 2-y-o form".

=== 1982: three-year-old season ===
Awaasif finished unplaced over one mile on her three-year-old debut and then won a minor race over ten furlongs at Lingfield Park Racecourse in May, beating Dreaming Away by six lengths. On 5 June Awaasif started at odds of 10/1 for the 204th running of the Oaks Stakes at Epsom, and finished fourth behind Time Charter, Slightly Dangerous and Last Feather. After the Oaks Awaasif contracted mastitis and was off the racecourse for more than two months, missing an intended run in the Irish Oaks.

On 17 August Awaasif returned in the Group One Yorkshire Oaks at York Racecourse where she was ridden by Lester Piggott. She started at odds of 4/1 in a field which included Height of Fashion, Last Feather, Swiftfoot and Dancing Rocks (winner of the Nassau Stakes). In a closely contested three-way finish, Awaasif took the lead in the last hundred yards and won by a neck and a head from Swiftfoot and Dish Dash. Her win was the first at Group One level for her owner, Sheikh Mohammed. Awaasif was then sent to France to contest the Prix Vermeille over 2400 metres at Longchamp Racecourse on 12 September. In a very strong field she started at odds of 10/1 and finished seventh of the thirteen runners behind All Along, who won by one and a half lengths from Akiyda.

Three weeks later, over the same course and distance, Awaasif started a 90/1 outsider for France's most prestigious race, the Prix de l'Arc de Triomphe. She produced the best performance of her career, finishing strongly to finish third, beaten a head and half a length by Akiyda and Ardross. The beaten horses included April Run, Assert, Harbour, Bikala and All Along. On her final appearance of the year she was sent to the United States for the Washington, D.C. International Stakes but failed to reproduce her Arc form as she finished fifth behind April Run.

=== 1983: four-year-old season ===
The late winter and spring of 1983 was unusually cold and wet, and Awaasif took time to reach peak fitness. She missed an intended run in the Hardwicke Stakes at Royal Ascot and made her first appearance in the Group Two Princess of Wales's Stakes at Newmarket Racecourse in July. She stayed on in the closing stages to finish fourth behind the Irish-trained three-year-old colt Quilted. Later that month she ran in Britain's most important all-aged race, the King George VI and Queen Elizabeth Stakes over one and a half miles at Ascot. Ridden by Bruce Raymond, she briefly took second place in the straight before finishing fourth behind Time Charter, Diamond Shoal and Sun Princess, beaten less than four lengths by the winner.

Awaasif sustained a minor injury in the Ascot race and did not run again until the Prix de l'Arc de Triomphe. Piggott turned down the chance to ride All Along in order to partner Awaasif, who started at odds of 13/1 in a field of twenty-six runners. Racing on firm ground, Awaasif was never nearer than eighth and eventually finished in thirteenth place, five and a half lengths behind All Along. Two weeks later, Awaasif travelled to Italy to contest the Group One Gran Premio del Jockey Club over 2400 metres in Milan. The field including several major winners including My Top (Derby Italiano), Right Bank (Premio Lydia Tesio), Tombos (German 2,000 Guineas) and Celio Rufo (Gran Premio d'Italia). Awaasif took the lead 400 metres and drew away from the field to win by six lengths from Right Bank. Timeform described her performance as "majestic". Awaasif again ended the year with a disappointing run in the United States: she finished last behind Zalataia in the Oak Tree Invitational Stakes, after which she was found to be running a high temperature.

== Assessment ==
In 1981 Timeform gave Awaasif a rating of 78P, the capital "P" indicating that she was very likely to be "capable of much better form" than she had so far displayed. The prediction was fulfilled as she was rated 130 in the following year, making her the third best three-year-old filly behind Akiyda and Time Charter. In the official International Classification she was the top-rated three-year-old of either sex trained in the United Kingdom and the equal second-best filly in Europe behind Akiyda. In 1983 Awaasif was rated 127 by Timeform seven pounds behind the top-rated older horse All Along. The International Classification placed her eleven pounds behind All Along and rated her the third-best older female in Britain behind Time Charter and the sprinter Soba.

== Stud career ==
Awaasif was retired from racing to become a broodmare for her owner Sheikh Mohammed. She produced at least twelve foals between 1985 and 2000:

- Salaadim (brown colt, foaled in 1985, sired by Seattle Slew), won one race
- Snow Bride (chestnut filly, 1986, by Blushing Groom), won Epsom Oaks, Musidora Stakes, Princess Royal Stakes dam of Lammtarra
- Jarraar (brown colt 1987, by Mr. Prospector) won New Orleans Handicap
- Habaayib (chestnut colt, 1988 by Blushing Groom) won two races
- Idraak (bay filly, 1989, by Kris)
- Ice Cool (chestnut colt, 1991, by Nashwan)
- Siberian (bay colt, 1992, by Machiavellian)
- Polent (bay filly, 1993, by Polish Precedent)
- Mutheer (bay colt, 1994, Rainbow Quest)
- Snowkissed (bay colt, 1996 Rainbow Quest)
- Ibn Al Haitham (bay colt, 1999, Zafonic) won Saranac Stakes
- Subtle Charm (bay filly, 2000, Machiavellian)

Awaasif died in May 2004 at the age of twenty-five.

== Pedigree ==
Pedigree of Awaasif (CAN), bay mare, 1979
Sire Snow Knight (GB) 1971	Firestreak (GB); 1956	Pardal	Pharis
Sire Snow Knight (GB) 1971	Firestreak (GB); 1956	Pardal	Adargatis
Sire Snow Knight (GB) 1971	Firestreak (GB); 1956	Hot Spell	Umidwar
Sire Snow Knight (GB) 1971	Firestreak (GB); 1956	Hot Spell	Haymaker
Sire Snow Knight (GB) 1971	Snow Blossom (GB); 1957	Flush Royal	Majano
Sire Snow Knight (GB) 1971	Snow Blossom (GB); 1957	Flush Royal	Altamira
Sire Snow Knight (GB) 1971	Snow Blossom (GB); 1957	Ariana	Tehran
Sire Snow Knight (GB) 1971	Snow Blossom (GB); 1957	Ariana	Snowberry
Dam Royal Statute (CAN) 1969	Northern Dancer (CAN); 1961	Nearctic	Nearco
Dam Royal Statute (CAN) 1969	Northern Dancer (CAN); 1961	Nearctic	Lady Angela
Dam Royal Statute (CAN) 1969	Northern Dancer (CAN); 1961	Natalma	Native Dancer
Dam Royal Statute (CAN) 1969	Northern Dancer (CAN); 1961	Natalma	Almahmoud
Dam Royal Statute (CAN) 1969	Queen's Statute (GB); 1954	Le Lavandou	Djebel
Dam Royal Statute (CAN) 1969	Queen's Statute (GB); 1954	Le Lavandou	Lavande
Dam Royal Statute (CAN) 1969	Queen's Statute (GB); 1954	Statute	Son-in-Law
Dam Royal Statute (CAN) 1969	Queen's Statute (GB); 1954	Statute	Nina (Family: 22-b)
