= Be My Guest (horse) =

American-bred, Irish-trained Thoroughbred racehorse

- Sire: Northern Dancer
- Grandsire: Nearctic
- Dam: What a Treat
- Damsire: Tudor Minstrel
- Sex: Stallion
- Foaled: 12 April 1974
- Country: United States
- Colour: Chestnut
- Breeder: Walter Haefner
- Owner: 1) Diana Guest Manning; 2) Coolmore Stud
- Trainer: Vincent O'Brien
- Record: 7: 4-1-0
- Earnings: US$49,869 (equivalent)

Major wins
- Waterford Crystal Mile (1977); Blue Riband Trial Stakes (1977); Desmond Stakes (1977)

Awards
- Leading sire in Great Britain and Ireland (1982)

Be My Guest (12 April 1974 – 19 February 2004) was an American-bred, Irish-trained Thoroughbred racehorse and champion sire in Britain. He was bred in Kentucky by Walter Haefner, a Swiss businessman and owner of Moyglare Stud Farm in Ireland. Sired by Northern Dancer, his dam was What a Treat, the 1965 American Champion Three-Year-Old Filly and a daughter of the 1947 2,000 Guineas Stakes winner, Tudor Minstrel.

Be My Guest was sold at the 1975 Goffs yearling sale for a then British and European record price of 127,000 guineas. His new owner, Diana Guest Manning, was the daughter of Frederick Guest and his wife Amy Phipps of the American Phipps family who have been major long-time figures in thoroughbred racing in the United States.

== Progeny ==
Be My Guest was a miler who won three Group races at age three in 1977 under trainer Vincent O'Brien. These victories included the Waterford Crystal Mile. He is also remembered as one of the foundation sires responsible for turning Ireland's Coolmore Stud into one of the most important Thoroughbred breeders in the world. .

Syndicated for £800,000, during his career at stud Be My Guest sired 78 stakes winners who were able to win at various distances. He was the Leading sire in Great Britain and Ireland in 1982. In addition, Be My Guest's daughters produced more than 90 stakes winners. Some of his notable progeny were:

Sire:

- Assert (b. 1979) - won four Group One races at age three including the Irish and French Derbys;
- On the House (b. 1979) - won the 1982 G1 Classic, the 1,000 Guineas Stakes, and the G1 Sussex Stakes;
- Luth Enchantee (b. 1980) - a filly who beat her male counterparts in winning the Group Ones Prix du Moulin de Longchamp and Prix Jacques le Marois;
- Go and Go (b. 1987) - won the Belmont Stakes, the third and longest leg of the United States Triple Crown series;
- Pentire (b. 1992) - multiple conditions race winner including the 1995 King George VI and Queen Elizabeth Diamond Stakes, Irish Champion Stakes, and Eclipse Stakes.

Damsire:

- Rock of Gibraltar (1999) - won a world record seven consecutive Group One races
- Manduro (b. 2002) - No. 1 ranked horse in the World in 2007

Pensioned after the 2002 breeding season , Be My Guest died on 19 February 2004 at the age of thirty.

== Pedigree ==
Pedigree of Be My Guest
Sire Northern Dancer	Nearctic	Nearco	Pharos
Sire Northern Dancer	Nearctic	Nearco	Nogara
Sire Northern Dancer	Nearctic	Lady Angela	Hyperion
Sire Northern Dancer	Nearctic	Lady Angela	Sister Sarah
Sire Northern Dancer	Natalma	Native Dancer	Polynesian
Sire Northern Dancer	Natalma	Native Dancer	Geisha
Sire Northern Dancer	Natalma	Almahmoud	Mahmoud
Sire Northern Dancer	Natalma	Almahmoud	Arbitrator
Dam What a Treat	Tudor Minstrel	Owen Tudor	Hyperion
Dam What a Treat	Tudor Minstrel	Owen Tudor	Mary Tudor
Dam What a Treat	Tudor Minstrel	Sansonnet	Sansovino
Dam What a Treat	Tudor Minstrel	Sansonnet	Lady Juror
Dam What a Treat	Rare Treat	Stymie	Equestrian
Dam What a Treat	Rare Treat	Stymie	Stop Watch
Dam What a Treat	Rare Treat	Rare Perfume	Eight Thirty
Dam What a Treat	Rare Treat	Rare Perfume	Fragrance
