= Caveat (horse) =

American-bred Thoroughbred racehorse

- Sire: Cannonade
- Grandsire: Bold Bidder
- Dam: Cold Hearted
- Damsire: The Axe II
- Sex: Stallion
- Foaled: March 16, 1980
- Country: United States
- Colour: Dark Brown
- Breeder: Ryehill Farm
- Owner: August Belmont IV, James P. Ryan, Robert Kirkham
- Trainer: Woody Stephens
- Record: 21: 6-4-3
- Earnings: $542,190

Major wins
- Prince John Stakes (1983); Derby Trial (1983); Triple Crown race wins: Belmont Stakes (1983)

Caveat (March 16, 1980 – February 21, 1995) was an American Thoroughbred racehorse.

== Background ==
Bred in Maryland by Ryehill Farm, he was sired by Kentucky Derby winner Cannonade out of The Axe II mare Cold Hearted. To date, Caveat is one of eleven Maryland-bred colts to win a Triple Crown race.

Caveat was owned by the partnership of August Belmont IV, Robert Kirkham, and his breeder, James P. Ryan. He was conditioned for racing by U.S. Racing Hall of Fame trainer Woody Stephens.

== Racing career ==
As a two-year-old, Caveat placed second in the Grade II Lane's End Breeders' Futurity Stakes with Eddie Maple aboard.

At age three, Caveat won the Prince John Stakes and came in second in the Arkansas Derby three weeks prior to the Derby. Woody Stephens felt like he needed a little tightening up, so he ran Caveat six days before the Derby and won the Derby Trial. Then in May, he placed third in the Kentucky Derby behind Sunny's Halo. Five weeks later, under jockey Laffit Pincay, Jr., he won the Belmont Stakes against a record field of 15 horses, straining a ligament in his right foreleg at the top of the stretch in the process. The injury was the cause of his eventual retirement.

== Retirement ==
Caveat was retired in August, 1983, and syndicated as a stallion. Among his progeny, he was the sire of Arlington Million winner Awad, Timely Warning, Cefis, Warning Glance, Ratings, and Ops Smile.

As a broodmare sire, he sired Beware of the Cat, dam of Belmont Stakes winner Editor's Note.

Caveat died in February, 1995, at Northview Stallion Station in Maryland and is buried in Windfields Farm Equine Cemetery at Northview Stallion Station.

== Pedigree ==
Pedigree of Caveat (USA), bay stallion, 1980
Sire Cannonade (USA) 1971	Bold Bidder (USA); 1962	Bold Ruler	Nasrullah
Sire Cannonade (USA) 1971	Bold Bidder (USA); 1962	Bold Ruler	Miss Disco
Sire Cannonade (USA) 1971	Bold Bidder (USA); 1962	High Bid	To Market
Sire Cannonade (USA) 1971	Bold Bidder (USA); 1962	High Bid	Stepping Stone
Sire Cannonade (USA) 1971	Queen Sucree (USA); 1966	Ribot	Tenerani
Sire Cannonade (USA) 1971	Queen Sucree (USA); 1966	Ribot	Romanella
Sire Cannonade (USA) 1971	Queen Sucree (USA); 1966	Cosmah	Cosmic Bomb
Sire Cannonade (USA) 1971	Queen Sucree (USA); 1966	Cosmah	Almahmoud
Dam Cold Hearted (USA) 1974	The Axe (USA); 1958	Mahmoud	Blenheim
Dam Cold Hearted (USA) 1974	The Axe (USA); 1958	Mahmoud	Mah Mahal
Dam Cold Hearted (USA) 1974	The Axe (USA); 1958	Blackball	Shut Out
Dam Cold Hearted (USA) 1974	The Axe (USA); 1958	Blackball	Big Event
Dam Cold Hearted (USA) 1974	Turn To North (USA); 1965	Turn-To	Royal Charger
Dam Cold Hearted (USA) 1974	Turn To North (USA); 1965	Turn-To	Source Sucree
Dam Cold Hearted (USA) 1974	Turn To North (USA); 1965	Bridle Way	Mustang
Dam Cold Hearted (USA) 1974	Turn To North (USA); 1965	Bridle Way	Straight Path (Family: 3-n)
