= Go and Go =

Irish-bred Thoroughbred racehorse

Go And Go
- Sire: Be My Guest
- Grandsire: Northern Dancer
- Dam: Irish Edition
- Damsire: Alleged
- Sex: Stallion
- Foaled: 1987
- Country: Ireland
- Colour: Chestnut
- Breeder: Moyglare Stud Farm
- Owner: Moyglare Stud Farm
- Trainer: Dermot K. Weld
- Record: 15: 6-0-2
- Earnings: $727,491

Major wins
- Tyros Stakes (1989); Laurel Futurity (1989); Minstrel Stakes (1990); Belmont Stakes (1990)

Honours
- Go And Go Round Tower Stakes at the Curragh
- Last updated on September 23, 2007

Go And Go (March 2, 1987 – 2000) was an Irish Thoroughbred racehorse best known for winning an American Triple Crown race- the Belmont Stakes.

== Background ==
Owned and bred by Swiss businessman Walter Haefner, Go And Go was bred at his Moyglare Stud Farm in Maynooth, County Kildare. The horse was sired by Be My Guest and out of the mare Irish Edition. His grandsire was the great Northern Dancer, and his damsire, Alleged, was a two-time winner of the Prix de l'Arc de Triomphe and 1977 European Horse of the Year.

== Racing career ==
Racing at age two in Ireland, Go And Go was trained by Dermot Weld and ridden by Michael Kinane. Between July and September 1989, he had four starts, losing in his first, then winning the next two before finishing tenth in the Group I National Stakes at the Curragh. Sent to the United States, Go And Go won the important Laurel Futurity at Laurel Park in Maryland that was originally scheduled for turf but because of extremely heavy rains leading up to that race was moved to the main track. He then ran eighth in the 1989 Breeders' Cup Juvenile at Gulfstream Park.

In 1990, Go And Go was back in Ireland, where he won the Minstrel Stakes at the Curragh in his three-year-old debut. He then ran fourth in the Derrinstown Stud Derby Trial, after which his handlers decided to enter him in June's Belmont Stakes at Belmont Park in New York off the success of his win in the off-the-turf Laurel Futurity the previous fall. With regular jockey Michael Kinane aboard in the third and longest leg of the U.S. Triple Crown series, Go and Go won the 1½ mile race. His victory in the nine-horse field came over runners-up Thirty Six Red and Baron De Vaux, plus the fourth-place finisher, the heavily favored Unbridled, who had won the Kentucky Derby and finished second in the Preakness Stakes.

Go And Go then finished seventh in August's Travers Stakes at Saratoga Race Course. In November's Breeders' Cup Classic, he was pulled up and did not finish. Left to race in the United States, Go and Go was trained by D. Wayne Lukas and ridden by Kent Desormeaux. Racing in California under Lukas, he finished third in December's Native Diver Handicap and January 1991 San Fernando Stakes. He was then dropped down to an allowance race, which he won. Sent next to Arlington Park in Chicago, he raced for the last time, finishing fourth in the 1991 Washington Park Handicap.

== Stud record ==
Go and Go was retired to stud duty, where he met with modest success. Standing at Dr. Jerry Bilinski's Waldorf Farm in North Chatham, New York, his best foal was gelding Hot Wells, winner of the Gr.III Southwest Stakes, who was also 4th in the 1998 Preakness Stakes. He also sired filly Marisa Go, who won the ungraded Zadracarta stakes at Woodbine, and Go Mikey Go, who won the 1998 Albany Handicap. Go Mikey Go is best known for being rescued from slaughter by the Thoroughbred Rescue Foundation.

In April 2000 he was euthanized as a result of a pelvis fracture sustained in a paddock accident. He is buried at Waldorf Farm.

== Pedigree ==
Pedigree of Go And Go (IRE), chestnut stallion, 1987
Sire Be My Guest (USA) 1974	Northern Dancer (CAN); 1961	Nearctic	Nearco
Sire Be My Guest (USA) 1974	Northern Dancer (CAN); 1961	Nearctic	Lady Angela
Sire Be My Guest (USA) 1974	Northern Dancer (CAN); 1961	Natalma	Native Dancer
Sire Be My Guest (USA) 1974	Northern Dancer (CAN); 1961	Natalma	Almahmoud
Sire Be My Guest (USA) 1974	What a Treat (USA); 1962	Tudor Minstrel	Owen Tudor
Sire Be My Guest (USA) 1974	What a Treat (USA); 1962	Tudor Minstrel	Sansonnet
Sire Be My Guest (USA) 1974	What a Treat (USA); 1962	Rare Treat	Stymie
Sire Be My Guest (USA) 1974	What a Treat (USA); 1962	Rare Treat	Rare Perfume
Dam Irish Edition (USA) 1980	Alleged (USA); 1974	Hoist The Flag	Tom Rolfe
Dam Irish Edition (USA) 1980	Alleged (USA); 1974	Hoist The Flag	Wavy Navy
Dam Irish Edition (USA) 1980	Alleged (USA); 1974	Princess Pout	Prince John
Dam Irish Edition (USA) 1980	Alleged (USA); 1974	Princess Pout	Determined Lady
Dam Irish Edition (USA) 1980	Grenzen (USA); 1975	Grenfall	Graustark
Dam Irish Edition (USA) 1980	Grenzen (USA); 1975	Grenfall	Primonetta
Dam Irish Edition (USA) 1980	Grenzen (USA); 1975	My Poly	Cyclotron
Dam Irish Edition (USA) 1980	Grenzen (USA); 1975	My Poly	Polywich (Family 10-a)
