= Akiyda =

British-bred Thoroughbred racehorse

- Sire: Labus
- Grandsire: Busted
- Dam: Licata
- Damsire: Abdos
- Sex: Mare
- Foaled: 21 April 1979
- Country: United Kingdom
- Colour: Brown
- Breeder: Marcel Boussac
- Owner: Aga Khan IV
- Trainer: François Mathet
- Record: 8:3-3-1

Major wins
- Prix de l'Arc de Triomphe (1982)

Awards
- Timeform rating: 113p (1981), 131 (1982); Top-rated European three-year-old filly (1982); Timeform top-rated three-year-old filly (1982)

Akiyda (foaled 21 April 1979) was a British-bred, French-trained Thoroughbred racehorse and broodmare best known for winning France's mot prestigious race, the Prix de l'Arc de Triomphe in 1982. After winning her only race as a two-year-old she was campaigned in the highest class in the following year, finishing second in both the Prix de Diane and the Prix Vermeille before beating a strong international field in the Prix de l'Arc de Triomphe. Akiyda never ran after her win in the Arc: she was retired to stud where she had limited impact as a broodmare.

== Background ==
Akiyda was a dark brown mare with a white sock on her left hind foot bred in the United Kingdom by Marcel Boussac. Her dam Licata, was a very good racemare who won the Prix Cléopâtre and Prix de Malleret in 1972. She was even better as a broodmare, producing the 1978 Prix du Jockey Club winner Acamas (by Mill Reef). By the late 1970s, Boussac's textile business was in decline and in both 1977 and 1978 he chose to have Licata covered by his own stallion Labus. Labus who was born in 1971 was by Busted-Cordovilla by Pharis. He was the winner of one minor race and group placed and never ran out of the money from his three starts. Labus dam Cordovilla was herself a daughter of the brilliant French Filly Cordova. By breeding to Labus Boussac did not have to pay a stud fee. Licata's first foal by Labus was Akarad, a colt who won the Prix Niel and the Grand Prix de Saint-Cloud: the second was Akiyda. At the dispersal of Boussac's bloodstock in 1978, Licata, Labus, Akarad and Akiyda were all acquired by the Aga Khan. Labus also sired Sadjiyd who was foaled in 1984 and bred by the Aga Khan on the same lines of Akiyda and Akarad. They all traced their female line back to the distinguished broodmare Tourzima. Sadjiyd won the Prix Noailles (Gr.2) and Prix Hocquart (gr.2) before going on to be favourite for the 1987 Epsom Derby. He would later finish second in the Rothmans International (gr.1) at Woodbine Canada in October 1987. He was later sent to Saudi Arabia for stud. Labus only other group winner was Imyar 1979 who won the 1983 Prix Exbury. Imyar's female line was also distinguished as his grandam was Ormara a full sister to the Prix d'le Arc de Triomphe winner Coronation.

Akiyda was trained by the veteran François Mathet at Chantilly. Mathet had trained many of the best French racehorses of the 20th century including Tantieme, Relko and Reliance.

== Racing career ==
=== 1981: two-year-old season ===
Akiyda did not run competitively until November 1981 when she was entered in the Prix Ténébreuse, a maiden race over 2000 metres at Saint-Cloud Racecourse. She won by five lengths from Miss Mat and twelve others. In their annual Racehorses of 1981 the independent Timeform organisation described her as "a very promising filly" who was "sure to win good middle-distances races at 3yrs".

=== 1982: three-year-old season ===
For most of her three-year-old season, Akiyda was campaigned in races restricted to horses of her own age and sex, competing against an unusually strong group of French fillies. In spring she finished fourth behind Harbour in the Prix Vanteaux at Saint-Cloud and third to All Along in the Prix Penelope at Longchamp Racecourse. In May she was moved up in distance and recorded her first win of the year when beating First Water by one and a half lengths in the Prix des Tuileries over 2400m at Longchamp. On 13 June Akiyda was moved up to Group One class for the first time to contest the Prix de Diane over 2100m at Chantilly. Starting at odds of 7.75/1 she was not among the early leaders but finished strongly to finish second, two lengths behind the winner Harbour with All Along in fifth place. In August Akiyda was strongly-fancied when moved up in distance for the Prix de Pomone over 2700m at Deauville Racecourse. The race was run at a slow pace, developing into sprint in the straight, and Akiyda was beaten by Zalataia.

In September Akiyda ran over 2400m at Longchamp in the Prix Vermeille, a Group One race for fillies which served as a trial race for the Prix de l'Arc de Triomphe. Racing on firm ground, Akiyda never looked likely to win, but stayed on in the straight to finish second, two lengths behind the winner All Along, with Harbour, Zalataia and the Yorkshire Oaks winner Awaasif unplaced. By the time that the Arc was run over the same course and distance three weeks later the weather had changed and the ground was very soft. The Irish-trained Assert started favourite ahead of Bon Sang (winner of the Prix Niel), Ardross, Harbour and Bikala with Akiyda next in the betting on 11/1. Bikala and Bon Sang set a very strong pace as they disputed the lead for most of the way, with Yves Saint-Martin settling Akiyda close behind. When the leaders began to tire in the straight, Saint-Martin sent Akiyda into the lead along the rail and the filly established a two-length advantage over the field. She was strongly challenged in the closing stages but held on to win by a head from Ardross, with Awaasif and April Run less than a length away in third and fourth. She was the fourth consecutive filly to win the race following Three Troikas, Detroit and Gold River.

== Assessment ==
In 1981, Akiyda was given a rating of 113p by Timeform, the "p" indicating that she was likely to make significant improvement. The prediction proved correct as Akiyda was given a Timeform rating of 131 in the following year, making her the equal-best three-year-old filly of the season alongside Time Charter. In the official International Classification she was the top-rated three-year-old filly, two pounds ahead of Awaasif and Harbour.

In their book, A Century of Champions, based on the Timeform rating system, John Randall and Tony Morris rated Akiyda an "inferior" winner of the Prix de l'Arc de Triomphe.

== Stud career ==
Akiyda was retired from racing after her win in the Arc to become a broodmare for her owner's stud. She produced only one foal to live to adulthood, a filly named Akishka, sired by Nishapour. Akishka never won a race, but had some success as a broodmare, producing Akbar (winner of the Henry II Stakes), and Akilara, the dam of Finesse Hurdle winner Akilak.

== Pedigree ==
Pedigree of Akiyda (GB), brown mare, 1979
Sire Labus (FR) 1971	Busted (GB); 1963	Crepello	Donatello
Sire Labus (FR) 1971	Busted (GB); 1963	Crepello	Crepuscule
Sire Labus (FR) 1971	Busted (GB); 1963	Sans Le Sou	Vimy
Sire Labus (FR) 1971	Busted (GB); 1963	Sans Le Sou	Martial Loan
Sire Labus (FR) 1971	Cordovilla (FR); 1957	Pharis	Pharos
Sire Labus (FR) 1971	Cordovilla (FR); 1957	Pharis	Carissima
Sire Labus (FR) 1971	Cordovilla (FR); 1957	Cordova	Djebel
Sire Labus (FR) 1971	Cordovilla (FR); 1957	Cordova	Caravelle
Dam Licata (FR) 1969	Abdos (FR); 1959	Arbar	Djebel
Dam Licata (FR) 1969	Abdos (FR); 1959	Arbar	Astronomie
Dam Licata (FR) 1969	Abdos (FR); 1959	Pretty Lady	Umidwar
Dam Licata (FR) 1969	Abdos (FR); 1959	Pretty Lady	La Moqueuse
Dam Licata (FR) 1969	Gaia (FR); 1962	Shantung	Sicambre
Dam Licata (FR) 1969	Gaia (FR); 1962	Shantung	Barley Corn
Dam Licata (FR) 1969	Gaia (FR); 1962	Gloriana	Pharis
Dam Licata (FR) 1969	Gaia (FR); 1962	Gloriana	Tourzima (Family: 13-c)

- Akiyda was inbred 3 x 4 to Phairis, meaning that this stallion appears in both the third and fourth generations of her pedigree. he was also inbred 4 x 4 to Djebel.
