= Time Charter =

Thoroughbred racehorse

- Racing silks of Robert Barnett
- Sire: Saritamer
- Grandsire: Dancer's Image
- Dam: Centrocon
- Damsire: High Line
- Sex: Mare
- Foaled: 6 April 1979
- Country: Ireland
- Colour: Bay
- Breeder: W & R Barnett
- Owner: Robert Barnett
- Trainer: Henry Candy
- Record: 20: 9-6-1
- Earnings: $918,320

Major wins
- Epsom Oaks (1982); Sun Chariot Stakes (1982); Champion Stakes (1982); King George VI & Queen Elizabeth S. (1983); Prix Foy (1983); Coronation Cup (1984)

Awards
- Timeform top-rated British three-year-old (1982); Timeform top-rated three-year-old filly (1982); Top-rated British older female (1983, 1984); Timeform rating: 103 (1981), 131 (1982), 130 (1983), 125 (1984)

Time Charter (6 April 1979 – 7 July 2005) was an Irish-bred, British-trained Thoroughbred racehorse and broodmare who won several major middle-distance races between 1982 and 1984. After winning twice as a two-year-old in 1981, she developed into a classic filly in the following year, finishing second in the 1000 Guineas before winning The Oaks in record time. Later that year she won the Sun Chariot Stakes before beating a field of colts and older horses by seven lengths in the Champion Stakes. As a four-year-old she won England's premier weight-for-age race, the King George VI and Queen Elizabeth Stakes and successfully conceded seven pounds to the outstanding French filly All Along in the Prix Foy. In 1984 she recorded an impressive four length victory in the Coronation Cup and was retired from racing at the end of the year having won nine of her twenty races. She later became a very successful broodmare.

== Background ==
Time Charter was a powerfully built bay mare with a white star and snip and four white socks bred in Ireland and owned throughout her career by the Barnett family. Her sire Saritamer was an American-bred, Irish-trained sprinter who won the Cork and Orrery Stakes, July Cup and Diadem Stakes in 1974. Time Charter was the first foal of her dam Centrocon a high-class racemare who won the Lancashire Oaks in 1976 and was a half-sister to several winners including Nicholas Bill (Geoffrey Freer Stakes, Princess of Wales's Stakes, Jockey Club Cup), Centroline (Jockey Club Cup) and Tale Quale (Jockey Club Cup).

Like all the Barnett's horses, the filly was trained by Henry Candy at Kingstone Warren in Oxfordshire. She was ridden in most of her races by William "Billy" Newnes.

== Racing career ==
=== 1981: two-year-old season ===
After finishing third over five furlongs on her racecourse debut, Time Charter won a six furlong race at Leicester Racecourse in July. In September she carried top weight of 133 pounds in a nursery handicap over seven furlongs at Goodwood Racecourse and won by three-quarters of a length from Lamlash. On her final appearance of the season she finished seventh when carrying top weight in another nursery handicap at Lingfield Park Racecourse in October.

=== 1982: three-year-old season ===
On her three-year-old debut, Time Charter contested the Masaka Stakes over one mile at Kempton Park Racecourse in early April and won by five lengths from Epithet. She was then moved up sharply in class for the 1000 Guineas over the Rowley Mile course at Newmarket Racecourse on 29 April. Starting at odds of 11/1 she disputed the lead with the sprinter Hello Cuddles until being overtaken by On The House two furlongs from the finish. She stayed on strongly in the closing stages to finish second, 2 1/2 lengths behind On The House and three lengths clear of Dione in third.

At Epsom Downs Racecourse on 5 June, Time Charter was one of thirteen fillies to contest the 204th running of the Oaks Stakes. Despite her performance in the 1000 Guineas, she was not among the favourites and started at odds of 12/1, probably because, as the daughter of a sprinter, she was thought unlikely to be effective over 1 1/2 miles. Billy Newnes (who was still an apprentice jockey at the time) restrained Time Charter at the back of the field before moving up on the outside in the straight. She took the lead inside the final furlong and won by a length from Slightly Dangerous, with Last Feather third, Awaasif fourth and All Along fifth. Her winning time of 2:34.21 was a record for the race and was faster than that recorded by Golden Fleece when winning the Derby over the same course and distance three days earlier. Time Charter reappeared in the Nassau Stakes (then a Group Two race) over ten furlongs at Goodwood Racecourse in late July. As a Group One winner she carried a seven-pound weight penalty and finished second, beaten two lengths by Dancing Rocks.

It had been expected that Time Charter would run at York Racecourse in August, contesting either the Yorkshire Oaks or the Benson and Hedges Gold Cup but was sidelined by a respiratory infection, described as "a dirty nose". She eventually returned for the Sun Chariot Stakes, a Group Two race over ten furlongs at Newmarket in October, in which she was again asked to concede weight to her rivals. Time Charter took the lead two furlongs from the finish and won "smoothly" by three-quarters of a length from Stanerra an Irish four-year-old who went on to win the Japan Cup in 1983. Two weeks later, Time Charter ran in the Champion Stakes over the same course and distance and started second favourite at odds of 9/2 behind Kalaglow the winner of the Eclipse Stakes and King George VI and Queen Elizabeth Stakes. The other runners included the 2000 Guineas winner Zino and the Queen Elizabeth II Stakes winner Buzzard's Bay. Newnes settled Time Charter towards the rear of the field before moving forward along the rails 3 1/2 furlongs from the finish. The filly was initially unable to obtain a clear run and Newnes had to force her through a gap between Montekin and the tiring Kalaglow, appearing to bump the latter. Once in the clear, Time Charter quickly took the lead and accelerated away from the field to win impressively by seven lengths, the biggest margin in the history of the race. It had been intended to retire the filly at the end of the season and have her covered by Northern Dancer, but following her win at Newmarket, it was decided that she would remain in training.

=== 1983: four-year-old season ===
Time Charter took time to reach her best form in the spring of 1983 when the weather in Britain was unusually cold and wet. She had suffered from an "internal abscess" early in the year and was clearly short of full fitness when she reappeared in the Jockey Club Stakes at Newmarket on 29 April. She was beaten a head by the colt Electric, being given a very gentle ride by Newnes. A leg injury ruled her out of an intended run in the Coronation Cup at Epsom, and she did not race again until the Eclipse Stakes over ten furlongs at Sandown Park Racecourse on 2 July. Newnes held up the filly in a slowly run race, and despite making ground in the straight she finished sixth behind Solford, Muscatite, Tolomeo, Guns of Navarone and Stanerra.

Three weeks after her disappointing run in the Eclipse, Time Charter was one of nine horses to contest the thirty-third running of Britain's most prestigious all-aged race, the King George VI and Queen Elizabeth Stakes over one and a half mile at Ascot. The 48-year-old veteran Joe Mercer took over from Newnes, who had been seriously injured in a fall on the training gallops nine days earlier. She started third favourite at odds of 5/1 behind the three-year-olds Caerleon and Sun Princess with the other runners including Awaasif, Lemhi Gold, Diamond Shoal and Lancastrian. Mercer held the filly up at the back of the field and was still five lengths behind the leaders when Diamond Shoal struck for home two furlongs from the finish. Time Charter made rapid progress on the outside to take the lead inside the final furlong and won by three-quarters of a length and a length from Diamond Shoal and Sun Princess.

Time Charter was then aimed at the Prix de l'Arc de Triomphe at Longchamp Racecourse and prepared for the race in the Prix Foy over the same course and distance in September. With Newnes again in the saddle, she overcame trouble in running to take the lead inside the last 200 metres and won easily by three-quarters of a length from All Along, who was carrying seven pounds less than the winner. On 2 October, Time Charter started the 3.25/1 favourite in a field of twenty-six runners for the Prix de l'Arc de Triomphe. She was in contention throughout the race and finished fourth, beaten a length, a neck and a nose by All Along, Sun Princess and Luth Enchantee, with female racehorses filling the first four places.

=== 1984: five-year-old season ===
Time Charter's training in the early part of 1984 was disrupted by a hip injury and she began her final season in the Coronation Cup at Epsom in June. She was matched for the third time against Sun Princess, with the other runners including Shearwalk (third in the Epsom Derby) and the top-class Irish filly Flame of Tara. Ridden by Steve Cauthen, she produced what was described as a "breathtaking performance", travelling very easily throughout the race before sprinting clear of her rivals in the final furlong to win by four lengths from Sun Princess. Time Charter was unable to add to her success in her three remaining races. At Sandown in July she appeared to be an unlucky loser in the Eclipse Stakes, failing to obtain a clear run in the straight and finishing very strongly to take second place, a neck behind Sadler's Wells. In the King George VI and Queen Elizabeth Stakes later that month she ran well, but never looked likely to repeat her 1983 victory finishing fourth behind Teenoso, Sadler's Wells and Tolomeo. Time Charter suffered from a "runny nose" in September, and on her final racecourse appearance she made little impact, finishing eleventh behind Sagace in the Prix de l'Arc de Triomphe.

== Assessment ==
As a two-year-old, Time Charter was given a rating of 103 by the independent Timeform organisation. In the following year, Timeform rated her on 131, making her the equal-best three-year-old filly of the season alongside Akiyda and the best three-year-old of either sex trained in the United Kingdom. In the official International Classification she was rated six pounds inferior to Akiyda, an assessment which Timeform described as "impossible to understand" and "nonsense". As a four-year-old Time Charter was rated 130 by Timeform making her the second-best older horse of the season behind All Along (134). In the International Classification she was the third best older horse, behind All Along and Diamond Shoal. Timeform rated her on 125 in 1984, and following the announcement of her retirement, commented that her record "stands comparison with that of any British-trained middle-distance performer of her sex since the war".

In their book, A Century of Champions, based on the Timeform rating system, John Randall and Tony Morris rated Time Charter a "superior" winner of the Oaks and the twenty-fourth best British or Irish female racehorse of the 20th century.

== Breeding record ==
Time Charter was retired from racing to become a successful and influential broodmare. She produced ten foals and seven winners and is the direct female ancestor of several major winners. Her foals included:

- By Charter (bay filly, foaled in 1986, sired by Shirley Heights), won one race, dam of Anton Chekhov (Prix Hocquart) and First Charter (Lonsdale Cup), granddam of Best Terms (Lowther Stakes)
- Dar Charter (filly 1988 by Darshaan)
- Zinaad (brown colt, 1989, by Shirley Heights), won G2 Jockey Club Stakes, sire of the Oaks winner Kazzia
- Not Before Time (IRE) (bay filly, 1991 by Polish Precedent), dam of Time Away (Musidora Stakes) and great grandam of Cursory Glance.
- Time Allowed (bay filly, 1993, by Sadler's Wells), won Princess Royal Stakes, Jockey Club Stakes
- Illusion (bay colt, 1994, by Green Desert), won one race
- Generous Terms (chestnut colt, 1995, by Generous), won two races
- Time Saved (bay filly, 1996, by Green Desert), won one race, dam of Plea Bargain (King Edward VII Stakes) and Lay Time (Winter Hill Stakes)
- Charterhouse (bay colt, 1997, by Shirley Heights) – unplaced in 2 races in England 2000
- Time Honoured (bay filly, 2000, by Sadler's Wells) won one race

Time Charter was pensioned from broodmare duties in 2001 and died in her sleep at the age of twenty-six at Fair Winter Farm in Buckinghamshire on 7 July 2005.

== Pedigree ==
Pedigree of Time Charter (IRE), bay mare, 1979
Sire Saritamer (USA) 1971	Dancer's Image (USA); 1965	Native Dancer	Polynesian
Sire Saritamer (USA) 1971	Dancer's Image (USA); 1965	Native Dancer	Geisha
Sire Saritamer (USA) 1971	Dancer's Image (USA); 1965	Noor's Image	Noor
Sire Saritamer (USA) 1971	Dancer's Image (USA); 1965	Noor's Image	Little Sphynx
Sire Saritamer (USA) 1971	Irish Chorus (IRE); 1960	Ossian	Royal Charger
Sire Saritamer (USA) 1971	Irish Chorus (IRE); 1960	Ossian	Prudent Polly
Sire Saritamer (USA) 1971	Irish Chorus (IRE); 1960	Dawn Chorus	Rising Light
Sire Saritamer (USA) 1971	Irish Chorus (IRE); 1960	Dawn Chorus	Duke's Delight
Dam Centrocon (GB) 1973	High Line (GB); 1966	High Hat	Hyperion
Dam Centrocon (GB) 1973	High Line (GB); 1966	High Hat	Madonna
Dam Centrocon (GB) 1973	High Line (GB); 1966	Time Call	Chanteur
Dam Centrocon (GB) 1973	High Line (GB); 1966	Time Call	Aleria
Dam Centrocon (GB) 1973	Centro (GB); 1966	Vienna	Aureole
Dam Centrocon (GB) 1973	Centro (GB); 1966	Vienna	Turkish Blood
Dam Centrocon (GB) 1973	Centro (GB); 1966	Ocean Sailing	Big Game
Dam Centrocon (GB) 1973	Centro (GB); 1966	Ocean Sailing	Kyanos (Family: 22-a)
