= What a Treat =

American-bred Thoroughbred racehorse

- Sire: Tudor Minstrel
- Grandsire: Owen Tudor
- Dam: Rare Treat
- Damsire: Stymie
- Sex: Filly
- Foaled: 1962
- Country: United States
- Colour: Bay
- Breeder: George D. Widener Jr.
- Owner: George D. Widener Jr.
- Trainer: Sylvester Veitch
- Record: not found
- Earnings: US$321,608

Major wins
- Mimosa Stakes (1965); Beldame Stakes (1965); Alabama Stakes (1965); Comely Stakes (1965); Gazelle Handicap (1965); Prioress Stakes (1965); Black Helen Handicap (1966)

Awards
- American Champion Three-Year-Old Filly (1965)

What a Treat (foaled 1962 in Kentucky) was an American Thoroughbred racehorse who was voted the 1965 American Champion Three-Year-Old Filly and who was sold as a broodmare in 1972 at a world record price.

== Background ==
Bred and raced by George D. Widener Jr., she was conditioned for racing by future U.S. Racing Hall of Fame trainer Syl Veitch.

== Racing career ==
As a three-year-old in 1965, What a Treat won seven of the top races for her age group, including a win over older stars Tosmah and Affectionately in capturing the Beldame Stakes.

At age four, carrying high weight, What a Treat finished off the board in the February 15, 1966 Columbiana Handicap at Florida's Hialeah Park Race Track. On that same track, she then won the March 2 Black Helen Handicap and won again at Aqueduct Racetrack on April 14 before running second in the Bed O' Roses Handicap. The rest of her 1966 campaign brought What a Treat limited success, with her finishing off the board in important races such as the Diana Handicap, Ladies Handicap, and Maskette Handicap. Although What a Treat was in training in May 1967, her career ended that year without further racing success.

== Breeding record ==
What a Treat was retired to broodmare duty at owner George Widener's Old Kenney Farm near Lexington, Kentucky, where he bred her to Never Bend. Following Widener's death in December 1971, on February 12, 1972, What a Treat was auctioned through the Keeneland Sales to a breeding syndicate from France for a then world record price for a broodmare of US$450,000. Of the foals she birthed for her new owners, her mating to Northern Dancer was the most successful, producing the 1974 colt Be My Guest. Although Be My Guest proved to be a good miler who won three Conditions races in England and Ireland, he is best remembered as one of the foundation sires responsible for turning Ireland's Coolmore Stud into one of the most important Thoroughbred breeding operations in the world.

== Pedigree ==
Pedigree of What a Treat
Sire Tudor Minstrel	Owen Tudor	Hyperion	Gainsborough
Sire Tudor Minstrel	Owen Tudor	Hyperion	Selene
Sire Tudor Minstrel	Owen Tudor	Mary Tudor	Pharos
Sire Tudor Minstrel	Owen Tudor	Mary Tudor	Anna Bolena
Sire Tudor Minstrel	Sansonnet	Sansovino	Swynford
Sire Tudor Minstrel	Sansonnet	Sansovino	Gondolette
Sire Tudor Minstrel	Sansonnet	Lady Juror	Son-in-Law
Sire Tudor Minstrel	Sansonnet	Lady Juror	Lady Josephine
Dam Rare Treat	Stymie	Equestrian	Equipoise
Dam Rare Treat	Stymie	Equestrian	Frilette
Dam Rare Treat	Stymie	Stop Watch	On Watch
Dam Rare Treat	Stymie	Stop Watch	Sunset Gun
Dam Rare Treat	Rare Perfume	Eight Thirty	Pilate
Dam Rare Treat	Rare Perfume	Eight Thirty	Dinner Time
Dam Rare Treat	Rare Perfume	Fragrance	Sir Gallahad III
Dam Rare Treat	Rare Perfume	Fragrance	Rosebloom
