= Ardross (horse) =

Irish-bred Thoroughbred racehorse

- Racing silks of Paddy Prendergast and Charles St George
- Sire: Run the Gantlet
- Grandsire: Tom Rolfe
- Dam: Le Melody
- Damsire: Levmoss
- Sex: Colt
- Foaled: 27 May 1976
- Country: Ireland
- Colour: Bay
- Breeder: Paddy Prendergast
- Owner: Elisabeth Ireland Poe; Charles St George
- Trainer: Paddy Prendergast; Kevin Prendergast; Henry Cecil
- Record: 24: 14-4-2
- Earnings: £412,458

Major wins
- Gallinule Stakes (1979); Saval Beg Stakes (1980); Jockey Club Cup (1980); Yorkshire Cup (1981, 1982); Ascot Gold Cup (1981, 1982); Goodwood Cup (1981); Geoffrey Freer Stakes (1981, 1982); Prix Royal-Oak (1981); Jockey Club Stakes (1982); Henry II Stakes (1982); Doncaster Cup (1982)

Awards
- Timeform rating 101, (1979), 131 (1980, 1981), 134 (1982); British Horse of the Year (1982); Timeform Horse of the Year (1982); Gilbey Racing Champion Racehorse of the Year (1982); Gilbey Racing Champion Racehorse of Europe (1982); Timeform Best Stayer (1981, 1982); Gilbey Racing Champion Stayer (1981,1982)

Ardross (27 May 1976 – 19 February 1994) was an Irish-bred Thoroughbred racehorse and sire. Racing at age three, he got his first significant win in the Gallinule Stakes at the Curragh. He also lost by a head to Akiyda in the 1982 Prix de l'Arc de Triomphe, the final race of his career. Ardross first raced for Ireland's Paddy Prendergast and, after his death, was bought by Charles St. George and trained by Henry Cecil in England, winning fourteen of his twenty-four starts, thirteen of them coming at Pattern level. He twice won the Ascot Gold Cup and the Yorkshire Cup. His other major successes came in the Prix Royal-Oak, the Doncaster Cup, and the Goodwood Cup. Before moving to Newmarket, he was runner-up to the Henry Cecil-trained Le Moss in the Ascot Gold Cup.

== Background ==
Ardross was bred by trainer Paddy Prendergast for his American owner Elisabeth Ireland Poe, who was also the breeder of Meadow Court. His sire was Run the Gantlet, a son of U.S. Racing Hall of Fame inducteeTom Rolfe. His dam, Le Melody, was a daughter of Levmoss.

== Racing career ==
=== 1979: three-year-old season ===
Ardross finished unplaced over ten furlongs on his racecourse debut and then created a 50/1 upset when winning the Group Two Gallinule Stakes at the Curragh by two lengths from Palace Dan. As a result of his success, he was required to carry a seven-pound weight penalty when he was sent to England to contest the King Edward VII Stakes at Royal Ascot. He finished unplaced behind Ela-Mana-Mou and did not race again in 1979.

=== 1980: four-year-old season ===
Ardross finished unplaced over ten furlongs on his first appearance as a four-year-old and was then moved up in distance for the Saval Beg Stakes at Leopardstown Racecourse. Racing over a distance of two miles, he established himself as a contender for the major staying races with a six-length victory over Croghan Hill. At Royal Ascot in June, Ardross started at odds of 6/1 for Britain's premier long-distance event, the Ascot Gold Cup over two and a half miles. He was always in touch with the leaders and produced a sustained challenge in the straight but failed by three-quarters of a length to overhaul Le Moss. In the Goodwood Cup the following month, Le Moss and Ardross dominated the race, with the former prevailing by a neck after a prolonged struggle. The third and final meeting of the two stayers came in the Doncaster Cup in September. The result was the same, with Le Moss holding off the challenge of Ardross to win by a neck. In October, Ardross was matched against the Jockey Club Stakes winner More Light in the Jockey Club Cup at Newmarket Racecourse. Starting the 5/6 favourite and ridden for the first time by Lester Piggott, he appeared beaten two furlongs from the finish but produced a strong late run to win by one and a half lengths. On his final appearance of the season, Ardross was sent to France for the Prix Royal Oak over 3100 metres in which he finished third to the three-year-old filly Gold River. Ardross was never beaten again at a distance beyond one and a half miles.

=== 1981: five-year-old season ===
For the 1981 season, Ardross raced in the ownership of Charles St George and was sent to England to be trained at Newmarket by Henry Cecil. He began his season in the Yorkshire Cup in May, when he started at odds of 2/1 and won by three lengths from Nicholas Bill. In the Ascot Gold Cup, he faced three opponents, only one of whom, the filly Shoot A Line, was given any chance against him. Starting at odds of 30/100, he was sent into the lead by Piggott with half a mile to run and won by a length from Shoot A Line. The Goodwood Cup attracted a bigger field, including the Queen Alexandra Stakes winner Donegal Prince and the Cesarewitch Handicap winner Popsi's Joy. Ardross won by a length from Donegal Prince at odds of 2/9, becoming the shortest-priced winner of the race since 1935.

Having dominated the stayers, Ardross was moved down in distance for the Geoffrey Freer Stakes over thirteen furlongs at Newbury Racecourse in August. Despite a slow early pace, he drew away in the straight to win by five lengths from Castle Keep and Cut Above. The form of the race was boosted when Cut Above defeated Shergar in the St Leger Stakes a month later. In October, Ardross contested France's most prestigious race, the Prix de l'Arc de Triomphe, over 2400 metres at Longchamp. Drawn disadvantageously in 24 of 24 on the wide outside he started at odds of 11/2 and proved the best of the British challengers, finishing fifth behind Gold River, Bikala, April Run, and Perrault. Among the horses finishing behind Ardross were Argument, Akarad, Kings Lake, Blue Wind, Cut Above, Detroit, Ring the Bell, and Beldale Flutter. Three weeks later, Ardross faced Gold River for the third time in the Prix Royal Oak. He took the lead on the final turn and drew clear of the field to win by four lengths from Proustille, with Gold River a further two and a half lengths back in third, becoming the first older horse to win the race which had been restricted to three-year-olds until 1979.

=== 1982: six-year-old season ===
Ardross began his six-year-old season by dropping back to one and a half miles for the Jockey Club Stakes at Newmarket in April. Starting at odds of 2/1, he won from Glint of Gold and Amyndas. In the following month, he claimed his second Yorkshire Cup, carrying top weight and winning by a length and a short head from Capstan and Little Wolf. Later in May, he again successfully conceded weight to Capstan to win the Henry II Stakes over two miles at Sandown Park Racecourse.

On 17 June, Ardross started 1/5 favourite for his attempt to win a second Ascot Gold Cup. His only opponents were the French-trained horses El Badr and Tipperary Fixer, first and second in the Prix du Cadran, the Irish six-year-old Noelino and the Swedish-trained Dzudo, making up the smallest field for the race in sixty years. Piggott settled the favourite in fourth place as Dzudo made the pace from El Badr and Noelino. Noelino took the lead on the final turn, but Ardross moved up quickly on the inside to take the lead two furlongs from the finish and won by three lengths and a neck from Tipperary Fixer and El Badr. It was a fourth successive win in the race for Henry Cecil and an eleventh for Piggott. Ardross was dropped back in distance for the Princess of Wales's Stakes at Newmarket in July. Carrying top weight on firm ground, he finished third behind Height of Fashion and Amyndas. He missed the King George VI and Queen Elizabeth Dianond Stakes before returning to form with comfortable wins in the Geoffrey Freer Stakes and the Doncaster Cup.In the autumn he ran second in his last try, and final race ever, at winning the Prix de l'Arc de Triomphe where he was narrowly beaten a head by the French filly Akiyda.

== Assessment ==
In their book A Century of Champions, based on a modified version of the Timeform system, John Randall and Tony Morris rated Ardross a "superior" Ascot Gold Cup winner and the third best British or Irish trained horse foaled in 1976 behind Troy and Kris.

== Stud career ==
When he went to stud, Ardross was syndicated for £2 million, but none of his progeny came anywhere near his level of ability. His best flat horses were Karinga Bay (Gordon Stakes) and the filly Filia Ardross. Overall, he did better as a sire of jumpers, with the Champion Hurdle winner Alderbrook, Anzum, Young Kenny, and Ackzo to his credit.

His son Karinga Bay sired Coneygree who won the 2015 Cheltenham Gold Cup.

Ardross died of a heart attack at age 18 on 19 February 1994, at Southcourt Stud in Leighton Buzzard, Bedfordshire, England.

== Sire line tree ==
- Ardross
  - Miocamen
  - Karinga Bay
    - Grave Doubts
    - Copsale Lad
    - Karanja
    - Shining Strand
    - Coneygree
  - Alderbrook
    - Baron Windrush
    - Ollie Magern
    - Sh Boom
  - Anzum
  - Young Kenny
  - Ackzo

== Pedigree ==
Pedigree of Ardross (IRE), bay stallion, 1976
Sire Run the Gantlet (USA) 1968	Tom Rolfe (USA); 1962	Ribot	Tenerani
Sire Run the Gantlet (USA) 1968	Tom Rolfe (USA); 1962	Ribot	Romanella
Sire Run the Gantlet (USA) 1968	Tom Rolfe (USA); 1962	Pocahontas	Roman
Sire Run the Gantlet (USA) 1968	Tom Rolfe (USA); 1962	Pocahontas	How*
Sire Run the Gantlet (USA) 1968	First Feather (USA); 1963	First Landing	Turn-To
Sire Run the Gantlet (USA) 1968	First Feather (USA); 1963	First Landing	Hildene
Sire Run the Gantlet (USA) 1968	First Feather (USA); 1963	Quill	Princequillo*
Sire Run the Gantlet (USA) 1968	First Feather (USA); 1963	Quill	Quick Touch
Dam Le Melody (IRE) 1971	Levmoss (IRE); 1965	Le Levanstell	Le Lavandou
Dam Le Melody (IRE) 1971	Levmoss (IRE); 1965	Le Levanstell	Stella's Sister
Dam Le Melody (IRE) 1971	Levmoss (IRE); 1965	Feemoss	Ballymoss
Dam Le Melody (IRE) 1971	Levmoss (IRE); 1965	Feemoss	Feevagh
Dam Le Melody (IRE) 1971	Arctic Melody (GB); 1962	Arctic Slave	Arctic Star
Dam Le Melody (IRE) 1971	Arctic Melody (GB); 1962	Arctic Slave	Roman Galley
Dam Le Melody (IRE) 1971	Arctic Melody (GB); 1962	Bell Bird	Mustang
Dam Le Melody (IRE) 1971	Arctic Melody (GB); 1962	Bell Bird	Belpatrick (Family:23)

* Ardross is inbred 5S x 4S to the stallion Princequillo, meaning that he appears fifth generation (via How) and fourth generation on the sire side of his pedigree.
