= 1995 in sports =

1995 in sports describes the year's events in world sport.

== Alpine skiing ==
- Alpine Skiing World Cup
  - Men's overall season champion: Alberto Tomba, Italy
  - Women's overall season champion: Vreni Schneider, Switzerland

== American football ==
- Super Bowl XXIX – the San Francisco 49ers (NFC) won 49–26 over the San Diego Chargers (AFC)
  - Location: Joe Robbie Stadium
  - Attendance: 74,107
  - MVP: Steve Young, QB (San Francisco)
- The World League of American Football is resumed after 2 years without play. Frankfurt Galaxy win the World Bowl 26–22 over the Amsterdam Admirals.
- Orange Bowl (1994 season):
  - The Nebraska Cornhuskers won 24–17 over the Miami Hurricanes to win the national championship

== Association football ==
- FIFA Women's World Cup – Norway won 2–0 over Germany
- World Club Championship – AFC Ajax defeat Grêmio 0–0 (4–3 in penalty shootout)
- Copa América – Uruguay defeats Brazil after a 1–1 draw (5-3 in penalty shoot).
- UEFA Champions League – AFC Ajax defeat A.C. Milan 1–0
- Campeonato Brasileiro Série A – Botafogo FR defeat Santos FC 3–2 (aggregate score)
- Copa Libertadores da América – Grêmio defeat Atlético Nacional 4–2 (aggregate score)
- Blackburn Rovers won the Premier League, denying Manchester United a hat-trick of titles
- December 15 – European football is shaken to its foundations when the European Court of Justice rules that:
  - Clubs in the European Union cannot be restricted from signing foreign players who are nationals of EU member states
  - Players under contract to clubs in the EU are entitled to a free transfer at the end of their contracts

== Australian rules football ==
- Australian Football League
  - The Fremantle Dockers join the league
  - Carlton wins the 99th AFL premiership beating Geelong 21.15 (141) to 11.14 (80)
  - The Blues become the first team to win 23 games in an AFL season or twenty in a home-and-away season
  - Brownlow Medal awarded to Paul Kelly (Sydney Swans)
- South Australian National Football League
  - Sturt suffer the ignominy of going winless for a full 22-match season, the only occurrence thereof in a major Australian Rules league.

== Baseball ==
- World Series – Atlanta Braves won 4 games to 2 over the Cleveland Indians. The Series MVP was Tom Glavine, Atlanta
- September 6 – Cal Ripken Jr. breaks Lou Gehrig's record of playing 2130 consecutive games.
- California Angels lose a 13-game lead over the Seattle Mariners, and lose the division title in a one-game playoff.

== Basketball ==
- NCAA Men's Basketball Championship
  - UCLA wins 89–78 over Arkansas, giving the Bruins their first National College Basketball Championship in 20 years, and 11th overall.
- NBA Finals
  - Houston Rockets win 4 games to 0 over the Orlando Magic
- National Basketball League (Australia) Finals:
  - Perth Wildcats defeated the North Melbourne Giants 2–1 in the best-of-three final series.
- A first season of China Professional Basketball Men's League game held on December 10.

== Boxing ==
- March 11 to March 27 – Pan American Games held in Mar del Plata, Argentina.
- May 6 – Oscar De La Hoya scored a second-round TKO in Las Vegas over Rafael Ruelas to retain his World Lightweight Championship.

== Canadian football ==
- For the first time in history, the Grey Cup went to an American-based team.
- Grey Cup – Baltimore Stallions win 37–20 over the Calgary Stampeders
- Vanier Cup – Calgary Dinos win 54–24 over the Western Ontario Mustangs

== Cricket ==
- December 26 in Melbourne – umpire Darrell Hair no balls Sri Lankan spinner Muttiah Muralitharan seven times for throwing in the second Test against Australia.

== Croquet ==
- The All England Association Handicap Championship is held, won by international croquet player Ian Lines.

== Cycling ==
- Giro d'Italia won by Tony Rominger of Switzerland
- Tour de France won by Miguel Indurain of Spain
- UCI Road World Championships – Men's road race – Abraham Olano of Spain

== Dogsled racing ==
- Iditarod Trail Sled Dog Race Champion
  - Doug Swingley won with lead dogs: Vic & Elmer

== Field hockey ==
- Men's Champions Trophy: Germany
- Women's Champions Trophy: Australia
- Men's European Nations Cup: Germany
- Women's European Nations Cup: Netherlands

== Figure skating ==
- World Figure Skating Championship:
  - Men's champion: Elvis Stojko, Canada
  - Ladies' champion: Chen Lu, China
  - Pairs' champions: Radka Kovariková / René Novotný, Czech Republic
  - Ice dancing champions: Oksana Grishuk / Evgeny Platov, Russia

== Floorball ==
- Floorball European Championships
  - Men's champion: Finland
  - Women's champion: Sweden
- European Cup
  - Men's champion: Kista IBK
  - Women's champion: Sjöstad IF

== Gaelic Athletic Association ==
- Camogie
  - All-Ireland Camogie Champion: Cork
  - National Camogie League: Cork
- Gaelic football
  - All-Ireland Senior Football Championship – Dublin 1-10 died Tyrone 0-12
  - National Football League – Derry 0-12 died Donegal 0-8
- Ladies' Gaelic football
  - All-Ireland Senior Football Champion: Waterford
  - National Football League: Waterford
- Hurling
  - All-Ireland Senior Hurling Championship – Clare 1-13 died Offaly 2-8
  - National Hurling League – Kilkenny 2-14 beat Clare 0-9

== Golf ==
Men's professional

- Masters Tournament – Ben Crenshaw
- U.S. Open – Corey Pavin
- British Open – John Daly
- PGA Championship – Steve Elkington
- PGA Tour money leader – Greg Norman – $1,654,959
- Senior PGA Tour money leader – Jim Colbert – $1,444,386
- Ryder Cup – Europe won 14½ to 13½ over the United States in team golf.

Men's amateur

- British Amateur – Gordon Sherry
- U.S. Amateur – Tiger Woods
- European Amateur – Sergio García

Women's professional

- Nabisco Dinah Shore – Nanci Bowen
- LPGA Championship – Kelly Robbins
- U.S. Women's Open – Annika Sörenstam
- Classique du Maurier – Jenny Lidback
- LPGA Tour money leader – Annika Sörenstam – $666,533

== Harness racing ==
- North America Cup – David's Pass
- United States Pacing Triple Crown races:
  1. Cane Pace – Mattgrilla Gorilla
  2. Little Brown Jug – Nick's Fantasy
  3. Messenger Stakes – David's Pass
- United States Trotting Triple Crown races:
  1. Hambletonian – Tagliabue
  2. Yonkers Trot – CR Kay Suzie
  3. Kentucky Futurity – CR Trackmaster
- Australian Inter Dominion Harness Racing Championship –
  - Pacers: Golden Reign
  - Trotters: Call Me Now

== Horse racing ==
Steeplechases

- Cheltenham Gold Cup – Master Oats
- Grand National – Royal Athlete

Flat races

- Australia – Melbourne Cup won by Doriemus
- Canada – Queen's Plate won by Regal Discovery
- France – Prix de l'Arc de Triomphe won by Lammtarra
- Ireland – Irish Derby Stakes won by Winged Love
- Japan – Japan Cup won by Lando
- English Triple Crown races:
  1. 2,000 Guineas Stakes – Pennekamp
  2. The Derby – Lammtarra
  3. St. Leger Stakes – Classic Cliche
- United States Triple Crown races:
  1. Kentucky Derby – Thunder Gulch
  2. Preakness Stakes – Timber Country
  3. Belmont Stakes – Thunder Gulch
- Breeders' Cup World Thoroughbred Championships:
  1. Breeders' Cup Classic – Cigar
  2. Breeders' Cup Distaff – Inside Information
  3. Breeders' Cup Juvenile – Unbridled's Song
  4. Breeders' Cup Juvenile Fillies – My Flag
  5. Breeders' Cup Mile – Ridgewood Pearl
  6. Breeders' Cup Sprint – Desert Stormer
  7. Breeders' Cup Turf – Northern Spur

== Ice hockey ==
- Art Ross Trophy as the NHL's leading scorer during the regular season: Jaromir Jagr, Pittsburgh Penguins
- Hart Memorial Trophy – for the NHL's Most Valuable Player: Eric Lindros, Philadelphia Flyers
- Stanley Cup – New Jersey Devils win 4 games to 0 over the Detroit Red Wings
- World Hockey Championship
  - Men's champion: Finland defeated Sweden
  - Junior Men's champion: Canada defeated Russia

== Lacrosse ==
- Major Indoor Lacrosse League Championship: The Philadelphia Wings win 15–14 over the Rochester Knighthawks after overtime.
- Mann Cup for the Canadian box lacrosse championship: Six Nations Chiefs of Major Series Lacrosse
- Inaugural European Lacrosse Championships – England defeats Czech Republic

== Mixed martial arts ==
The following is a list of major noteworthy MMA events during 1995 in chronological order.

Before 1997, the Ultimate Fighting Championship (UFC) was considered the only major MMA organization in the world and featured much fewer rules then are used in modern MMA.

Date	Event	Alternate Name/s	Location	Attendance	PPV Buyrate	Notes
April 7	UFC 5: The Return of the Beast	—N/a	(United States) Charlotte, North Carolina, US	6,000	260,000	UFC rule change, introduction to a single 30 minute round. Introduction of superfights. Rorion Gracie and Royce Gracie cut there involvement with the UFC following this event.
July 14	UFC 6: Clash of the Titans	—N/a	(United States) Casper, Wyoming, US	2,700	240,000	UFC rule change, referee is given the authority to restart the fight. Introduction to additional 5 minute extension to 30 minute round. Introduction of superfight titles.
September 8	UFC 7: The Brawl in Buffalo	—N/a	(United States) Buffalo, New York, US	9,000	190,000	—N/a
December 16	The Ultimate Ultimate	Ultimate Ultimate 1995; UFC 7.5	(United States) Denver, Colorado, US	2,800	—N/a	Time limits were redefined for this event. 15 minutes in quarterfinal fights, 18 minutes for semi-final fights, and 27 minutes with a possible 3 minute overtime for the final fight.

== Radiosport ==
- First IARU Region III Amateur Radio Direction Finding Championships held in Japan.
- First High Speed Telegraphy World Championship held in Siófok, Hungary.

== Rugby league ==
- Australian international representative forward Ian Roberts became the first high-profile Australian sports person and first rugby footballer in the world to come out to the public as gay.
- March 5 – Carcassonne, France: last match of the 1995 European Championship is played with Wales finishing on top of the table.
- March 10 – Auckland, New Zealand: newly formed Auckland Warriors club play their first match: a 25–22 loss to the Brisbane Broncos at Ericsson Stadium before 29,220.
- April 29 – London, England: 1994-95 Challenge Cup tournament culminates in Wigan's 30–10 win over Leeds in the final at Wembley Stadium before 78,550.
- May 31 – Melbourne, Australia: 1995 State of Origin is wrapped up by Queensland in game two of the three-match series against New South Wales at the Melbourne Cricket Ground before 52,994.
- September 24 – Sydney, Australia: 1995 ARL season culminates in the Sydney Bulldogs' 17–4 win over the Manly-Warringah Sea Eagles in the grand final at the Sydney Football Stadium before 41,127.
- October 24 – Bury, England: 1995 Emerging Nations Tournament culminates in the Cook Islands' 22–6 win over Ireland in the final at Gigg Lane before 4,147.
- October 28 – London, England: 1995 World Cup culminates in Australia's 16–8 win over England in the final at Wembley Stadium before 66,540.

== Rugby union ==
- 101st Five Nations Championship series is won by England who complete the Grand Slam
- Rugby World Cup is won by hosts South Africa 15–12 over New Zealand in the final with an extra-time drop goal by Joel Stransky
- 26 August – International Rugby Football Board lifts the century-old ban on professionalism

== Snooker ==
- World Snooker Championship – Stephen Hendry beats Nigel Bond 18-9
- World rankings – Stephen Hendry remains world number one for 1995/96

== Swimming ==
- February 11 – Danyon Loader swims world record in the Men's 400m Freestyle, while Mark Foster betters the world record in the Men's 50m Butterfly and Sandra Völker swims a European record in the Women's 50m Backstroke.
- February 18 – Australia's Angela Kennedy breaks the world record in the Women's 100m Butterfly (short court): 58.77
- XII Pan American Games, held in Mar del Plata, Argentina (March 12 – 18)
- 22nd European LC Championships, held in Vienna, Austria (August 22 – 27)
  - Germany wins the most medals (28), Russia the most gold medals (14)
- II. World Short Course Championships, held in Rio de Janeiro, Brazil (November 30 – December 3)
  - December 2 – China's Liu Limin breaks the world record in the Women's 100m Butterfly (short course): 58:68
  - December 3 – Australia wins the most medals (26), and the most gold medals (12)

== Taekwondo ==
- World Championships held in Manila, Philippines

== Tennis ==
- Grand Slam in tennis men's results:
  1. Australian Open – Andre Agassi
  2. French Open – Thomas Muster
  3. Wimbledon championships – Pete Sampras
  4. U.S. Open – Pete Sampras
- Grand Slam in tennis women's results:
  1. Australian Open – Mary Pierce
  2. French Open – Steffi Graf
  3. Wimbledon championships – Steffi Graf
  4. U.S. Open – Steffi Graf
- Davis Cup – The USA wins 3–2 over Russia.
- Fed Cup – Spain wins 3–2 over the USA in the first Fed Cup to bear that name, and the first to employ a Davis Cup-style format.

== Volleyball ==
- Men's World Cup: Italy
- Men's European Championship: Italy
- Women's World Cup: Cuba
- Women's European Championship: Netherlands

== Water polo ==
- Men's World Cup: Hungary
- Men's European Championship: Italy
- Women's European Championship: Italy

== Yacht racing ==
- New Zealand wins its first America's Cup as Black Magic, of the Royal New Zealand Yacht Squadron, beats defender Young America, from San Diego Yacht Club, 5 races to 0

== Multi-sport events ==
- Twelfth Pan American Games held in Mar del Plata, Argentina
- Sixth All-Africa Games held in Harare, Zimbabwe
- 18th Summer Universiade held in Fukuoka, Japan
- 17th Winter Universiade held in Jaca, Spain
- 18th SEA Games held in Chiang Mai, Thailand

== Awards ==
- Associated Press Male Athlete of the Year – Cal Ripken Jr., Major League Baseball
- Associated Press Female Athlete of the Year – Rebecca Lobo, College basketball
