= Rabelais (horse) =

British-bred thoroughbred racehorse

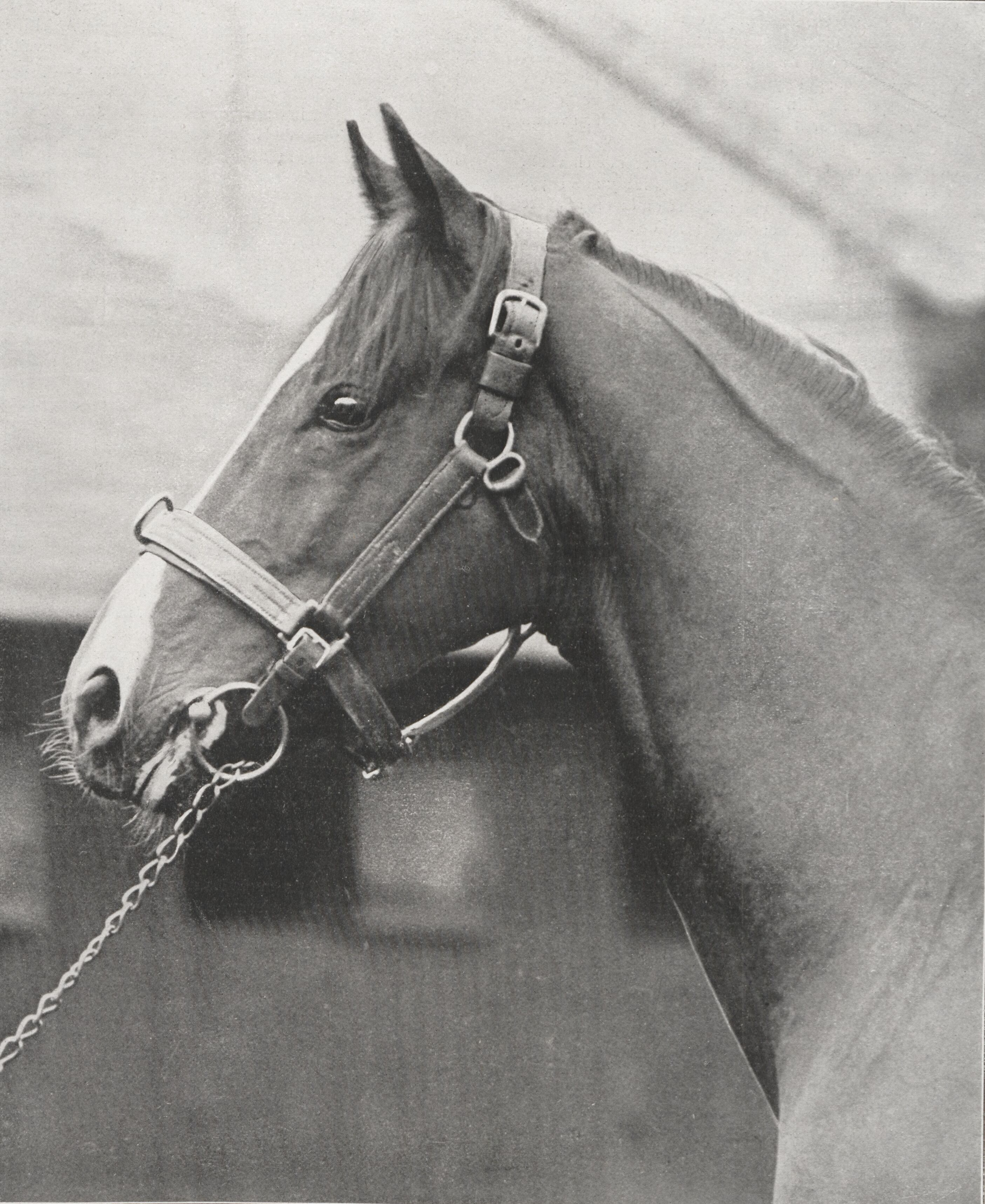
- From Le Sport universel illustré (December 13, 1908)
- Sire: St. Simon
- Grandsire: Galopin
- Dam: Satirical
- Damsire: Satiety
- Sex: Stallion
- Foaled: 1900
- Died: 1928
- Country: Great Britain
- Colour: Bay
- Breeder: Arthur James
- Owner: Arthur James
- Record: 11: 6-2-1
- Earnings: £10,604

Major wins
- National Breeders' Produce Stakes (1902) Triennial Stakes (1902, 1903); Buckenham Post Produce Stakes (1902); Prince of Wales's Stakes (1902) Goodwood Cup (1903)

Awards
- Champion Sire in France (1909, 1919, 1926)

Rabelais (1900–1928) was a British-bred thoroughbred racehorse and notable sire in France.

== Background ==
Rabelais was a bay stallion who stood 15.3 or 16 hands high, with tall withers, a round, muscular croup, thin waist, and strong back. He toed in slightly and had "enough bone for his light frame". He was considered handsome and had three white socks.

Rabelais was bred by Arthur James and foaled in 1900. He was named after the French writer François Rabelais.

Rabelais was sired by St. Simon, who was undefeated on the racecourse and became one of the most influential sires of all time.

Satirical, Rabelais's dam, had shown class on the racetrack despite a more mediocre pedigree, winning six races including the Newmarket Houghton Handicap.

== Racing career ==
During his racing career, Rabelais was trained by Richard Marsh.

Rabelais debuted as a two-year-old in the Sandown Park Stud Stakes in April, finishing second. He went on to win in all four of his subsequent starts that year, including the Triennial Stakes (by five lengths), the National Breeders' Produce Stakes, the Prince of Wales's Stakes, and the Buckenham Stakes, in which he easily defeated his singular opponent.

As a three-year-old, Rabelais finished third in the 2000 Guineas behind Rock Sand and Flotsam III. Flotsam III beat Rabelais again in the Newmarket Stakes, in which Rabelais finished second. In the Epsom Derby, Rabelais ran fourth behind Rock Sand, Vinicus, and Flotsam III.

Rabelais then traveled to Ascot to win the Triennial Stakes for the second time. He ran disappointingly in the St. George Stakes, finishing unplaced, before triumphing in the Goodwood Cup in his last race, defeating older horses by four lengths.

All told, Rabelais won four of five starts at two, second once, and two of six starts at three, second once and third once, with earnings of £10,604. He won at distances from 5 to 20 furlongs.

== Stud career ==
Upon retiring from racing, Rabelais was sold privately to France for £900, entering stud in France in 1904.

Rabelais led the French general sire list in 1909,1919, and 1926. He was also second five times and third once. By the end of 1928, his offspring had won about 730 races and nearly 13,000,000 francs.

Rabelais was known for producing sound offspring, although prone to ringbone and navicular issues and with light bone. He also passed on an araby head. His offspring tended to be expressive and have an elastic action, although lacking in scope. He is also noted to pass on remarkable longevity.

In 1927, Rabelais began to have issues with virility and fertility. In an attempt to restore his vitality, testes were harvested from a stallion who was unable to race due to a joint problem and grafted onto Rabelais. The operation was reported to be a success, but Rabelais died only two days later.

Rabelais continued the St. Simon sireline through to Wild Risk and Ribot via his sons Rialto and Havresac.

In the Roman-Miller Dosage System, Rabelais is considered a Professional chef-de-race.

Notable progeny

- Durbar, winner of the Epsom Derby, Prix de Saint-Cloud, and Prix Delatre; leading sire in France
- Verdun, winner of the Poule d'Essai des Poulains, Grand Prix de Paris, etc.; leading sire in Argentina
- Ramus, winner of the Prix du Jockey Club and Prix de Condé
- Biribi, French Champion Three-Year-Old, winner of the Prix de l'Arc de Triomphe, Prix Royal Oak, Prix Lupin, etc.; Champion Sire in France 1941
- Roahouga, winner of the Poule d'Essai des Pouliches, Prix Chloé, etc.
- Radames, winner of the Grand Prix de Saint-Cloud, etc.
- Rialto, winner of the Prix Fleche d'Or, Prix d'Ispahan, etc.
- Pendennis, winner of the Poule d'Essai des Poulains, Prix Noailles, etc.
- Long Set, winner of the Doncaster Cup, Lincolnshire Handicap, etc.
- Vellica, winner of the Poule d'Essai des Pouliches
- Rire Aux Larmes, winner of the Grosser Preis von Baden-Baden
- Naturalist, winner of the Manhattan Handicap twice, Toboggan Handicap, Carter Handicap, etc.
- Havresac, Champion Sire in Italy 1924–1931 and 1933–1934

Notable progeny of daughters

- Watling Street, winner of the Epsom Derby and Chesterfield Stakes
- Garden Path, winner of the 2000 Guineas
- Blue Star, French Champion Two-Year-Old Filly, winner of the Criterium de Maisons-Laffitte and Prix de la Forêt
- Arpette, winner of the Prix Jacques le Marois, Prix Chloé, etc.
- The Scout, winner of the Yorkshire Cup and Newmarket Stakes
- Confidence, winner of the Grand Prix de Deauxville and Prix des Foals
- Little Chief, winner of the Manhattan Handicap twice, Travers Stakes, Brooklyn Handicap, etc.

== Sire line tree ==
- Rabelais
  - Jacobi
    - Nouvel An
      - Empressor
  - Verdun
    - Soldat De Verdun
    - Barranquero
  - Long Set
  - Rire Aux Larmes
    - Losir
    - Take My Tip
  - Durbar
    - Scaramouche
      - Pantalon
        - Talon
    - Altay
    - Xander
    - Bathorse
    - Indian Salute
  - Munibe
  - Haki
  - Lord Loris
  - Naturalist
  - Havresac
    - Manistee
    - Lui
    - Dervio
    - Cavaliere d'Arpino
      - Bellini
        - Tenerani
      - Trau
        - Leon de San Marco
        - Spegasso
      - Traghetto
        - Nuccio
        - Zamoretto
        - Rio Martin
  - Radames
    - Motrico
      - Hahnhof
  - Pendennis
  - Ramus
  - Biribi
    - Birikil
      - Mat de Cocagne
    - Labrador
    - Le Pacha
      - Marco Polo
        - Macdougal
        - Polo Prince
  - Rialto
    - Saranak
    - Sanguinetto
    - Hern The Hunter
    - Eros
    - Wild Risk
      - Worden
        - Bel Baraka
        - Marino
        - Trevieres
        - Widsun
        - Devon
        - Armistice
        - Bon Mot
        - Bazin
        - Karabas
      - Fort National
        - Un Espoir
      - Mon Capitaine
        - Captain Christy
        - Bentom Boy
      - Vimy
        - Khalkis
      - Fils D'Eve
      - Balto
      - Le Fabuleux
        - Beau Charmeur
        - Bourbon
        - Schleswig
        - Effervescing
        - Meneval
        - The Bart
        - Ben Fab
        - Dauphin Fabuleux
      - Waldmeister
        - Sunset
        - Apollon
        - Carteziano
    - Houdon
    - Rabirius
  - Fenimore Cooper
    - Hunting Ground

== Pedigree ==
Pedigree of Rabelais (GB), bay stallion, foaled 1900
Sire St Simon (GB) 1881	Galopin (GB); 1872	Vedette (GB)	Voltigeur (GB)
Sire St Simon (GB) 1881	Galopin (GB); 1872	Vedette (GB)	Mrs. Ridgway (GB)
Sire St Simon (GB) 1881	Galopin (GB); 1872	Flying Duchess (GB)	The Flying Dutchman (GB)
Sire St Simon (GB) 1881	Galopin (GB); 1872	Flying Duchess (GB)	Merope (GB)
Sire St Simon (GB) 1881	St Angela (GB); 1865	King Tom (GB)	Harkaway* (GB)
Sire St Simon (GB) 1881	St Angela (GB); 1865	King Tom (GB)	Pocahontas* (GB)
Sire St Simon (GB) 1881	St Angela (GB); 1865	Adeline (GB)	Ion* (GB)
Sire St Simon (GB) 1881	St Angela (GB); 1865	Adeline (GB)	Little Fairy (GB)
Dam Satirical (GB) 1891	Satiety (GB); 1885	Isonomy (GB)	Sterling (GB)
Dam Satirical (GB) 1891	Satiety (GB); 1885	Isonomy (GB)	Isola Bella (GB)*
Dam Satirical (GB) 1891	Satiety (GB); 1885	Wifey (GB)	Cremorne (GB)
Dam Satirical (GB) 1891	Satiety (GB); 1885	Wifey (GB)	Lady Mary (GB)
Dam Satirical (GB) 1891	Chaff (GB); 1880	Wild Oats (GB)	Wild Dayrell (GB)
Dam Satirical (GB) 1891	Chaff (GB); 1880	Wild Oats (GB)	The Golden Horn (GB)*
Dam Satirical (GB) 1891	Chaff (GB); 1880	Celerrima (GB)	Stockwell* (GB)
Dam Satirical (GB) 1891	Chaff (GB); 1880	Celerrima (GB)	Slander (GB)

* Rabelais is inbred 4S x 6D x 5D to the mare Pocahontas, meaning that she appears fourth generation once on the sire side of his pedigree and sixth generation once (via Isola Bella)^ and fifth generation once (via Stockwell)^ on the dam side of his pedigree.

* Rabelais is inbred 4S x 5D to the stallion Harkaway, meaning that he appears fourth generation on the sire side of his pedigree and fifth generation (via The Golden Horn)^ on the dam side of his pedigree.

* Rabelais is inbred 4S x 5D to the stallion Ion, meaning that he appears fourth generation on the sire side of his pedigree and fifth generation (via Wild Dayrell)^ on the dam side of his pedigree.
