= Karabas =

Karabas or Carabas may refer to:

- Karabas (horse) (born 1965), European Thoroughbred racehorse
- Karabas Barabas, a villain in Buratino, Russian fairy tale
- Karabas (or Carabas; Greek: Καραβᾶς), is the name of an idiot mentioned by Philo in his Flaccus, part of an incident in Alexandria in AD 38, mocking the Jewish king Herod Agrippa I.
- Karabaş (or Karabash), alternative name for Anatolian Shepherd Dog, a dog breed
- Marquis of Carabas, a fictional character in the fairy tale "Puss in Boots"
