= Quiet Fling =

American-bred Thoroughbred racehorse

- Racing silks of John Hay Whitney
- Sire: Nijinsky
- Grandsire: Northern Dancer
- Dam: Peace
- Damsire: Klairon
- Sex: Stallion
- Foaled: 1972
- Colour: Bay
- Breeder: John Hay Whitney
- Owner: John Hay Whitney
- Trainer: Jeremy Tree
- Record: 15: 5-3-1

Major wins
- John Porter Stakes (1976); Coronation Cup (1976)

Awards
- Timeform rating 99p (1974), 124 (1975), 122 (1976), 122 (1977)
- Last updated on 19 February 2025

Quiet Fling (foaled 1972) was an American-bred, British-trained Thoroughbred racehorse and sire. After finishing second on his only start as a two-year-old, he developed into a good horse the following year by winning two handicap races and finishing second in the Irish St. Leger. In 1976 he won the John Porter Stakes and then recorded his biggest win, the Coronation Cup. He failed to win in five subsequent races and was retired to stud at the end of the 1977 season. He had limited success as a breeding stallion.

== Background ==
Quiet Fling was a "big, tall, rangy" bay horse, with a white star and snip and three white socks bred in Kentucky by his owner John Hay "Jock" Whitney. He was from the first crop of foals sired by Nijinsky, the Canadian-bred winner of the 1970 English Triple Crown. Nijinsky went on to become an important breeding stallion, siring horses such as Ferdinand, Lammtarra, Sky Classic and Shahrastani. Quiet Fling's dam Peace showed good racing ability, finishing second to Full Dress in the 1,000 Guineas Trial Stakes and being rated 113 by Timeform. She was a very successful broodmare whose other foals included Intermission (Cambridgeshire Handicap), Peacetime (Sandown Classic Trial), Peaceful (Bessborough Stakes) and Armistice Day (Prix Exbury). She was a descendant of the influential British broodmare Point Duty.

Whitney sent Quiet Fling to race in Europe where he was trained by Jeremy Tree at Beckhampton in Wiltshire.

== Racing career ==
=== 1974: two-year-old season ===
On his only appearance as a two-year-old, Quiet Fling contested the Houghton Stakes over seven furlongs at Newmarket Racecourse in October and finished second of the twenty-four runners, beaten half a length by Bygone.

=== 1975: three-year-old season ===
In 1975 Quiet Fling finished unplaced over nine furlongs on his seasonal debut but was then moved up in distance and won a maiden race over one mile five furlongs at Newbury Racecourse by ten lengths. He won two of his next four races taking a handicap race over fourteen furlongs at York Racecourse by two lengths and the Fitzwilliam Stakes over a mile and half at Doncaster in September beating Tebaldi by three lengths. On his final appearance of the season he was stepped up in class for the Irish St. Leger at the Curragh and finished second to the Vincent O'Brien-trained Caucasus.

=== 1976: four-year-old season ===
On his first appearance of 1976 Quiet Fling was ridden by Lester Piggott and started at odds of 5/1 for the John Porter Stakes at Newbury in April. He tracked the leaders before taking the lead two furlongs from the finish and won by two lengths from the French-trained Rouge Sang (later to win the Gran Premio di Milano), with Libra's Rib (Princess of Wales's Stakes) in third. At Epsom Racecourse in June Quiet Fling, with Piggott again in the saddle, started 5/2 favourite for the 71st running of the Coronation Cup. His opponents included Libra's Rib, Zimbalon (King George V Stakes, Ormonde Stakes) and the French challengers Infra Green (Prix Ganay) and Val du Fier. After being restrained by Piggott at the rear of the field, Quiet Fling produced a strong late run in the straight, took the lead a furlong out, and won by half a length from Libra's Rib.

Quiet Fling failed to reproduce his best form in his two subsequent races in 1976. He finished sixth behind Riverqueen in the Grand Prix de Saint-Cloud in July and sixth when brought back in distance for the Benson and Hedges Gold Cup at York in August.

=== 1977: five-year-old season ===
In the spring of 1977, Quiet Fling's early preparation was badly interrupted by a respiratory infection and he did not appear until June, when he attempted to repeat his 1976 win in the Coronation Cup. Starting at odds of 7/1 he took the lead early in the straight but was overtaken inside the final furlong and was beaten a neck into second place by Exceller. At Royal Ascot two weeks later he finished third behind Meneval and Ranimer in the Hardwicke Stakes. On his final appearance he was sent to Germany and finished unplaced in the Grosser Preis von Berlin at Düsseldorf in July.

== Assessment ==
In 1974 the independent Timeform organisation gave Quiet Fling a rating of 99 p with the "p" indicating that he was likely to make more than usual improvement. In their annual Racehorses of 1974 they described him as "sure to win races". In the following year he was rated 124 by Timeform, thirteen pounds behind their Horse of the Year Grundy. He was rated 122 in 1976 and 1977.

== Stud record ==
After his final race, a major share in Quiet Fling was bought by Captain F G Barkley and the horse was retired to Barkley's King Edward's Place Stud at Wanborough. He later moved to the Mint Lane Farm in Kentucky. The best of his offspring was Old Country, whose win included the Derby Italiano, Prix Royal-Oak and Premio Roma. His last recorded foals were born in 1988.

== Pedigree ==
Pedigree of Quiet Fling (USA), bay stallion, 1972
Sire Nijinsky (CAN) 1967	Northern Dancer (CAN); 1961	Nearctic	Nearco
Sire Nijinsky (CAN) 1967	Northern Dancer (CAN); 1961	Nearctic	Lady Angela
Sire Nijinsky (CAN) 1967	Northern Dancer (CAN); 1961	Natalma	Native Dancer
Sire Nijinsky (CAN) 1967	Northern Dancer (CAN); 1961	Natalma	Almahmoud
Sire Nijinsky (CAN) 1967	Flaming Page (CAN); 1959	Bull Page	Bull Lea
Sire Nijinsky (CAN) 1967	Flaming Page (CAN); 1959	Bull Page	Our Page
Sire Nijinsky (CAN) 1967	Flaming Page (CAN); 1959	Flaring Top	Menow
Sire Nijinsky (CAN) 1967	Flaming Page (CAN); 1959	Flaring Top	Flaming Top
Dam Peace (FR) 1966	Klairon (FR); 1952	Clarion	Djebel
Dam Peace (FR) 1966	Klairon (FR); 1952	Clarion	Columba
Dam Peace (FR) 1966	Klairon (FR); 1952	Kalmia	Kantar
Dam Peace (FR) 1966	Klairon (FR); 1952	Kalmia	Sweet Lavender
Dam Peace (FR) 1966	Sun Rose (GB); 1960	Mossborough	Nearco
Dam Peace (FR) 1966	Sun Rose (GB); 1960	Mossborough	All Moonshine
Dam Peace (FR) 1966	Sun Rose (GB); 1960	Suntime	Precipitation
Dam Peace (FR) 1966	Sun Rose (GB); 1960	Suntime	Sun Helmet (Family:1-p)
