= Meneval =

American-bred Thoroughbred racehorse

- Racing silks of Jacqueline Getty
- Sire: Le Fabuleux
- Grandsire: Wild Risk
- Dam: Nalee
- Damsire: Nashua
- Sex: Stallion
- Foaled: 30 March 1973
- Country: United States
- Colour: Bay
- Breeder: Mrs G M Humphrey
- Owner: Jacqueline Getty Phillips; J. R. Fluor
- Trainer: Vincent O'Brien; Stephen A. DiMauro
- Record: 17: 5-2-0

Major wins
- Ballysax Stakes (1976); Nijinsky Stakes (1976); Gallinule Stakes (1976); Irish St. Leger (1976); Hardwicke Stakes (1977)

Awards
- Top-rated Irish-trained older horse (1977); Timeform rating 92p (1975), 128 (1976), 129 (1977)

Meneval (30 March 1973 – after 1995) was an American-bred Thoroughbred racehorse and sire. Bred in Kentucky and sent to race in Ireland as a yearling and showed considerable promise when finishing second on his only start as a two-year-old in 1975. In the following year he was undefeated in four starts, winning the Ballysax Stakes, Nijinsky Stakes and Gallinule Stakes in spring and then returning after a lengthy break to record his biggest victory in the Irish St. Leger. As a four-year-old he won the Hardwicke Stakes but failed to live up to expectations that he would become a leading contender for the Prix de l'Arc de Triomphe. He failed to reproduce his European form when campaigned in the United States in 1978. He later stood as a breeding stallion in the United States and Ireland but had little success as a sire of winners.

== Background ==
Meneval was a "strong, very good-looking" bay horse with a small white star bred in Kentucky by Mrs G M Humphrey. As a yearling he was put up for auction at Keeneland and bought for $170,000 by representatives of Mrs George Getty II. He was subsequently sent to Europe to train under Vincent O'Brien at Ballydoyle.

His sire Le Fabuleux was a successful French racehorse who won the Prix du Jockey Club in 1964 and went on to sire several good winners including Dauphin Fabuleux and Effervescing. Meneval's dam Nalee won the Black-Eyed Susan Stakes and came from an outstanding family, being a daughter of Levee and a full-sister to Shuvee.

== Racing career ==
=== 1975: two-year-old season ===
Meneval made his racecourse debut in a maiden race over one mile at Leopardstown Racecourse in October in which he started at odds of 33/1 and finished second to his stablemate Semenenko. The independent Timeform organisation gave him a rating of 92 p (the "p" indicating that he was likely to make significant improvement) and commented that he was "sure to win races".

=== 1976: three-year-old season ===
Meneval was ridden in all four of his races as a three-year-old by Lester Piggott and won easily on each occasion. On his seasonal debut he recorded his first win when he started at odds of 1/4 for the Saval Beg Stakes over ten furlongs at the Curragh in April and came home four lengths clear of his rivals. In May the colt again started 1/4 favourite for the Nijinsky Stakes over the same distance at Leopardstown and defeated the Beresford Stakes winner Whistling Deer by a length. Meneval was then moved up in distance for the Group 2 Gallinule Stakes over one and half miles at the Curragh on 29 May and justified odds of 1/3 as he beat the British-trained Lost Chord by a length and a half. The O'Brien stable was badly affected by a "virus infection" is the summer of 1976 and Meneval was off the track for well over three months.

On 18 September Meneval returned in the Irish St. Leger over one and three quarter miles at the Curragh and started the 5/6 favourite in an eleven-runner field. The best fancied of his opponents were Lost Chord, the Queen's Vase winner General Ironside and the improving handicapper Red Invader. Piggott restrained the favourite in the early stages as General Ironside built up a clear lead. Meneval overtook the leader in the straight, drew right away from the field and "hacked up" by eight lengths from General Ironside with the filly Countess Eileen three lengths back in third.

At the end of the season Timeform gave him a rating of 128, sven pounds behind their Horse of the Year Youth but only a pound behind their best stayer Sagaro.

=== 1977: four-year-old season ===
Meneval remained in training as a four-year-old with the Prix de l'Arc de Triomphe as his main objective. On his first appearance of the year he sustained his first defeat for over eighteen months when he finished fifth of the seven runners behind his stablemate Alleged (a 33/1 outsider) in the Royal Whip Stakes at the Curragh. In June Meneval raced outside Ireland for the first time when he was sent to Royal Ascot and started 2/1 favourite for the Hardwicke Stakes. Ridden as usual by Piggott he has held up towards the rear before finishing strongly and won by one and a half lengths from the French filly Ranimer (winner of the Sun Chariot Stakes), with Quiet Fling the same distance away in third. In July he was sent to France and finished fifth to Exceller in the Grand Prix de Saint-Cloud with Piggott reporting that the colt needed softer ground to show his best form. In the Cumberland Lodge Stakes at Ascot in September he was held up by Piggott for a late run but was never able to get on terms with the leader Orange Bay and was beaten four lengths into second place. The race had been intended to prepare the horse for the Arc, but he missed the French race and did not run again in 1977.

Timeform gave Meneval a rating of 129 for the 1977 season, four pounds behind Sagaro and Balmerino who were there top-rated older males. In the inaugural International Classification he was given a rating of 87 making him the highest-rated older horse trained in Ireland.

=== 1978: five-year-old season ===
In 1978 Meneval was sent to race in the United States where he competed in the colours of J R Fluor and was trained by Stephen A. DiMauro. His North American career was a complete failure as he failed to win or place in any of his eight races.

== Stud record ==
At the end of his racing career Meneval was retired to become a breeding stallion in the United States. He was sent to Ireland in the late 1980s where he was used as a National Hunt sire. He sired numerous minor jump race winners but no top-class performers.

== Pedigree ==
Pedigree of Meneval (USA), bay stallion, 1973
Sire Le Fabuleux (FR) 1961	Wild Risk (FR); 1940	Rialto	Rabelais
Sire Le Fabuleux (FR) 1961	Wild Risk (FR); 1940	Rialto	La Grelee
Sire Le Fabuleux (FR) 1961	Wild Risk (FR); 1940	Wild Violet	Blandford
Sire Le Fabuleux (FR) 1961	Wild Risk (FR); 1940	Wild Violet	Wood Violet
Sire Le Fabuleux (FR) 1961	Anguar (FR); 1950	Verso	Pinceau
Sire Le Fabuleux (FR) 1961	Anguar (FR); 1950	Verso	Variete
Sire Le Fabuleux (FR) 1961	Anguar (FR); 1950	La Rochelle	Easton
Sire Le Fabuleux (FR) 1961	Anguar (FR); 1950	La Rochelle	Sans Tares
Dam Nalee (USA) 1960	Nashua (USA); 1952	Nasrullah	Nearco
Dam Nalee (USA) 1960	Nashua (USA); 1952	Nasrullah	Mumtaz Begum
Dam Nalee (USA) 1960	Nashua (USA); 1952	Segula	Johnstown
Dam Nalee (USA) 1960	Nashua (USA); 1952	Segula	Sekhmet
Dam Nalee (USA) 1960	Levee (USA); 1953	Hill Prince	Princequillo
Dam Nalee (USA) 1960	Levee (USA); 1953	Hill Prince	Hildene
Dam Nalee (USA) 1960	Levee (USA); 1953	Bourtai	Stimulus
Dam Nalee (USA) 1960	Levee (USA); 1953	Bourtai	Escutcheon (Family:9-f)
