= Worden (horse) =

French-bred Thoroughbred racehorse and sire (1949–1969)

- Sire: Wild Risk
- Grandsire: Rialto
- Dam: Sans Tares
- Damsire: Sind
- Sex: Stallion
- Foaled: 1949
- Country: France
- Color: Chestnut
- Breeder: Ralph B. Strassburger
- Owner: Ralph B. Strassburger
- Trainer: Georges Bridgland
- Record: 21: 6-3-4
- Earnings: $92,970

Major wins
- Prix du Conseil Municipal (1952); Premio Roma (1952); Prix du Prince d'Orange (1953); Prix Vermout (1953); Washington, D.C. International Stakes (1953)

Awards
- Leading broodmare sire in Great Britain and Ireland (1975, 1976)

Honors
- Prix Worden at Saint-Cloud Racecourse
- Last updated on 23 July 2024

Worden (1949-1969) was a Thoroughbred racehorse and sire foaled in France. Bred and raced by American expatriate Ralph Strassburger, Worden was raced in France, England, Italy and the United States.

== Background ==
Worden's French-bed sire Wild Risk was successful in European flat racing as well as over jumps. At stud, Wild Risk was the Leading sire in France in 1961 and 1964. His progeny also included the very good runners Le Fabuleux, Prix du Jockey Club winner and the 1980 Leading Broodmare Sire in France bred and raced by Guy Weisweiller. Le Fabuleux would in turn sire the 1984 Canadian Horse of the Year, Dauphin Fabuleux. Wild Risk also sired Pierre Wertheimer's Vimy that won the 1955 King George VI and Queen Elizabeth Stakes and the Prix Noailles.

== Racing career ==
Worden won stakes races in France and Italy, but his most important came in the United States at Laurel Park Racecourse where he won the 1953 edition of the Washington, D.C. International Stakes, forerunner of the Breeders' Cup. Among other performances in Worden's career, in England had run third to Epsom Derby winner Tulyar in the 1952 King George VI and Queen Elizabeth Stakes at Ascot and third again in the 1953 edition to Sir Victor Sasoon's colt Pinza. Before being shipped to the United States, on October 4 Worden ran third in the Prix de l'Arc de Triomphe at Longchamp to Paul Duboscq's winning filly La Sorellina.

== At stud ==
As a stallion Worden stood for his owners at his birthplace, the Haras des Monceaux in Les Monceaux in Normandy. In 1959 he was the second Leading sire in France and third on the list in 1960 and 1961. Among the best horses he sired was Karabas, winner of the Washington D.C. International in 1969. Through his daughter's progeny Worden posthumously became the Leading broodmare sire in Great Britain and Ireland for 1975 and 1976.

Through his daughters, Worden was the damsire of:

- 1965 - Vent du Nord who won races in France and North America including the prestigious Canadian International Championship Stakes in 1969 under future U. S. Triple Crown winner, jockey Ron Turcotte
- 1972 - Grundy, leading British two-year-old of 1974 and Timeform Top-rated Horse in 1975. His career wins included the 1974 Dewhurst and Champagne Stakes, the 1975 Epsom Derby and Irish 2,000 Guineas
- 1973 - La Mer, New Zealand Horse of the Year
- 1976 - Scintillate, winner of the 1979 Epsom Oaks

Worden's other progeny included the stallion Trevieres who in turn sired the very good racemare, Tizna.

== Sire line tree ==
- Worden
  - Bel Baraka
    - Dirham
      - Le Sauteur
  - Marino
    - Carvin
  - Trevieres
  - Widsun
    - Willipus
  - Devon
    - Camarthen
      - Piomares
      - Katko
    - Le Bavard
      - Perris Valley
      - Glebe Lad
    - Quart de Vin
      - Ucello
      - Granit d'Estreval
    - Fondeur
  - Armistice
    - Kemal
      - Rhyme 'n' Reason
  - Bon Mot
  - Bazin
    - Trapezio
  - Karabas
    - Heracleon

== Pedigree ==
Pedigree of Worden, chestnut colt, 1949
Sire Wild Risk	Rialto	Rabelais	St. Simon
Sire Wild Risk	Rialto	Rabelais	Satirical
Sire Wild Risk	Rialto	La Greelee	Helicon
Sire Wild Risk	Rialto	La Greelee	Grignouse
Sire Wild Risk	Wild Violet	Blandford	Swynford
Sire Wild Risk	Wild Violet	Blandford	Blanche
Sire Wild Risk	Wild Violet	Wood Violet	Ksar
Sire Wild Risk	Wild Violet	Wood Violet	Pervencheres
Dam Sans Tares	Sind	Solario	Gainsborough
Dam Sans Tares	Sind	Solario	Sun Worship
Dam Sans Tares	Sind	Mirawala	Phalaris
Dam Sans Tares	Sind	Mirawala	Miranda
Dam Sans Tares	Tara	Teddy	Ajax
Dam Sans Tares	Tara	Teddy	Rondeau
Dam Sans Tares	Tara	Jean Gow	Neil Gow
Dam Sans Tares	Tara	Jean Gow	Jane Shore (family: 13-c)
