= Wild Risk =

French thoroughbred racehorse

- Sire: Rialto
- Grandsire: Rabelais
- Dam: Wild Violet
- Damsire: Blandford
- Sex: Stallion
- Foaled: 1940
- Died: 1967
- Country: France
- Colour: Bay
- Record: 13 wins in 36 starts
- Earnings: $107,618

Major wins
- Grande Course de Haies d'Auteuil (1944, 1945)

Wild Risk (1940–1967) was a French-bred thoroughbred racehorse who became a leading sire and Professional Chef-de-race.

== Background ==
Wild Risk was a medium-to-small horse. His right front hoof tended towards being a club foot, and his shoulders were a bit upright and narrow. He had long cannon bones and a very good temperament.

His sire Rialto won the Prix d'Ispahan and ran second in the Prix de l'Arc de Triomphe before becoming an important stallion.

Wild Violet, Wild Risk's dam, was a winner, sired by Blandford out of the good winner Wood Violet.

== Racing career ==
Wild Risk raced in German-occupied France during the Second World War.

He broke his maiden as a two-year-old at odds of 100/1 after four poor prior starts.

Wild Risk was a good stakes winner on the flat and also performed well over jumps, winning the Grand Course de Haies d'Auteuil twice in 1944 and 1945. Despite this, he wasn't considered to be of the highest caliber of racehorse, at least on the flat. He was thought to be one of the best French hurdlers during the war.

== Stud career ==
Wild Risk was considered to be a poor sire prospect when he was retired. He was among the leading sires in France multiple times, leading the list for flat sires 1961 and 1964 and the list for jumpers in 1966. He was named a Professional Chef-de-race in the Roman-Miller Dosage System. He sired 123 mares who went on to produce 633 foals, of which 152 (24%) were winners. His broodmare sire AEI was 1.58 and CI was 1.48. He died in 1967.

Notable progeny

- Balto, winner of the Ascot Gold Cup and Grand Prix de Paris
- Waldmeister, winner of the Prix du Cadran, La Coupe, and Prix Gladiateur; leading sire in Brazil
- Worden, winner of the Prix du Conseil Municipal and Washington D. C. International Stakes; Chef-de-race
- Le Fabuleux, winner of the Prix du Jockey Club, Criterium de Saint-Cloud, and Prix Lupin; Chef-de-race
- Vimy, winner of the King George VI and Queen Elizabeth Stakes and Prix Noailles
- Fils D'Eve, winner of the Derby Italiano
- Almyre, winner of the Prix Omnium
- Wild Miss, winner of the Prix Vermeille

Notable progeny of daughters

- Blushing Groom, winner of the Prix Robert Papin, Prix Morny, Prix de la Salamandre, Grand Criterium, Poule d'Essai des Poulains, etc.; Chef-de-race

== Sire line tree ==
- Wild Risk
  - Worden
    - Bel Baraka
      - Dirham
        - Le Sauteur
    - Marino
      - Carvin
    - Trevieres
    - Widsun
      - Willipus
    - Devon
      - Camarthen
        - Piomares
        - Katko
      - Le Bavard
        - Perris Valley
        - Glebe Lad
      - Quart de Vin
        - Ucello
        - Granit d'Estreval
      - Fondeur
    - Armistice
      - Kemal
        - Rhyme 'n' Reason
    - Bon Mot
    - Bazin
      - Trapezio
    - Karabas
      - Heracleon
  - Fort National
    - Un Espoir
  - Mon Capitaine
    - Captain Christy
    - Bentom Boy
  - Vimy
    - Khalkis
  - Fils D'Eve
  - Balto
  - Le Fabuleux
    - Beau Charmeur
      - Biko
    - Bourbon
    - Schleswig
      - Rasputin
        - Depositante
    - Effervescing
    - Meneval
    - The Bart
    - Ben Fab
    - Dauphin Fabuleux
      - French King
  - Waldmeister
    - Sunset
      - Ego Trip
    - Apollon
    - Carteziano

== Pedigree ==
Pedigree of Wild Risk (FR), bay stallion, foaled 1940
Sire Rialto (FR) 1923	Rabelais (GB); 1900	St. Simon (GB)	Galopin (GB)
Sire Rialto (FR) 1923	Rabelais (GB); 1900	St. Simon (GB)	St. Angela (GB)
Sire Rialto (FR) 1923	Rabelais (GB); 1900	Satirical (GB)	Satiety (GB)
Sire Rialto (FR) 1923	Rabelais (GB); 1900	Satirical (GB)	Chaff (GB)
Sire Rialto (FR) 1923	La Grelee (FR); 1918	Helicon (GB)	Cyllene (GB)
Sire Rialto (FR) 1923	La Grelee (FR); 1918	Helicon (GB)	Vain Duchess (GB)
Sire Rialto (FR) 1923	La Grelee (FR); 1918	Grignouse (FR)	Kilglass (GB)
Sire Rialto (FR) 1923	La Grelee (FR); 1918	Grignouse (FR)	Simper (GB)
Dam Wild Violet (FR) 1935	Blandford (IRE); 1919	Swynford (GB)	John o'Gaunt (GB)
Dam Wild Violet (FR) 1935	Blandford (IRE); 1919	Swynford (GB)	Canterbury Pilgrim (GB)
Dam Wild Violet (FR) 1935	Blandford (IRE); 1919	Blanhe (IRE)	White Eagle (IRE)
Dam Wild Violet (FR) 1935	Blandford (IRE); 1919	Blanhe (IRE)	Black Cherry (GB)
Dam Wild Violet (FR) 1935	Wood Violet (FR); 1928	Ksar (FR)	Bruleur (FR)
Dam Wild Violet (FR) 1935	Wood Violet (FR); 1928	Ksar (FR)	Kizil Kourgan (FR)
Dam Wild Violet (FR) 1935	Wood Violet (FR); 1928	Pervencheres (FR)	Maboul (FR)
Dam Wild Violet (FR) 1935	Wood Violet (FR); 1928	Pervencheres (FR)	Poet's Star (GB)
