= 1995 Epsom Derby =

- Location: Epsom Downs Racecourse
- Date: 10 June 1995
- Winning horse: Lammtarra
- Starting price: 14/1
- Jockey: Walter Swinburn
- Trainer: Saeed bin Suroor
- Owner: Saeed bin Maktoum bin Rashid Al Maktoum

Epsom Derby 1995
1-2-3
Lammtarra	Tamure	Presenting

Also Ran
4-5-6
Fahal	Court Of Honour	Vettori
7-8-9
Riyadian	Humbel	Munwar
10-11-12
Salmon Ladder	Pennekamp	Korambi
13-14-15
Spectrum	Daffaq	Maralinga

The 1995 Epsom Derby was a horse race which took place at Epsom Downs on Saturday 10 June 1995. It was the 216th running of the Derby, and it was won by Lammtarra. The winner was ridden by Walter Swinburn and trained by Saeed bin Suroor. The pre-race favourite Pennekamp finished eleventh.

== Race details ==
- Sponsor: Vodafone
- Winner's prize money: £504,500
- Going: Good to Firm
- Number of runners: 15
- Winner's time: 2m 32.31s (new record)

== Full result ==
	*	Horse	Jockey	Trainer ^{†}	SP
1		Lammtarra	Walter Swinburn	Saeed bin Suroor	14/1
2	1	Tamure	Frankie Dettori	John Gosden	9/1
3	¾	Presenting	Cash Asmussen	John Gosden	12/1
4	1¼	Fahal	Richard Hills	David Morley	50/1
5	shd	Court of Honour	Brent Thomson	Peter Chapple-Hyam	66/1
6	3	Vettori	Ray Cochrane	Saeed bin Suroor	20/1
7	hd	Riyadian	Richard Quinn	Paul Cole	16/1
8	nk	Humbel	Michael Kinane	Dermot Weld (IRE)	25/1
9	7	Munwar	Willie Carson	Peter Walwyn	8/1
10	6	Salmon Ladder	Kevin Darley	Paul Cole	50/1
11	1	Pennekamp	Thierry Jarnet	André Fabre (FR)	11/8 fav
12	11	Korambi	Michael Roberts	Clive Brittain	150/1
13	nk	Spectrum	John Reid	Peter Chapple-Hyam	5/1
14	nk	Daffaq	Brian Rouse	Peter Walwyn	500/1
15	20	Maralinga	Michael Fenton	Michael Bell	200/1

* The distances between the horses are shown in lengths or shorter. shd = short-head; hd = head; nk = neck.
† Trainers are based in Great Britain unless indicated.

== Winner's details ==
Further details of the winner, Lammtarra:

- Foaled: 2 February 1992, in Kentucky, US
- Sire: Nijinsky; Dam: Snow Bride (Blushing Groom)
- Owner: Saeed bin Maktoum Al Maktoum
- Breeder: Gainsborough Farms
- Rating in 1995 International Classifications: 130

== Form analysis ==
=== Two-year-old races ===
Notable runs by the future Derby participants as two-year-olds in 1994.

- Lammtarra – 1st Washington Singer Stakes
- Presenting – 1st Autumn Stakes
- Fahal – 4th Superlative Stakes, 3rd Solario Stakes, 1st Stardom Stakes, 4th Royal Lodge Stakes, 6th Racing Post Trophy
- Court of Honour – 6th Haynes, Hanson and Clark Stakes, 3rd Gran Criterium, 1st Premio Guido Berardelli
- Humbel – 1st Eyrefield Stakes
- Munwar – 1st Haynes, Hanson and Clark Stakes
- Pennekamp – 1st Prix de la Salamandre, 1st Dewhurst Stakes
- Korambi – 8th Royal Lodge Stakes
- Daffaq – 4th Washington Singer Stakes
- Maralinga – 7th Chesham Stakes

=== The road to Epsom ===
Early-season appearances in 1995 and trial races prior to running in the Derby.

- Tamure – 1st Glasgow Stakes
- Presenting – 1st Newmarket Stakes, 3rd Dante Stakes
- Fahal – 3rd Predominate Stakes
- Court of Honour – 2nd Chester Vase, 2nd Derby Italiano
- Vettori – 1st Poule d'Essai des Poulains
- Riyadian – 2nd Lingfield Derby Trial
- Humbel – 1st Ballysax Stakes, 1st Derrinstown Stud Derby Trial
- Munwar – 1st Feilden Stakes, 1st Lingfield Derby Trial
- Salmon Ladder – 6th Dante Stakes
- Pennekamp – 1st Prix Djebel, 1st 2,000 Guineas
- Spectrum – 1st Irish 2,000 Guineas
- Maralinga – 3rd Chester Vase

=== Subsequent Group 1 wins ===
Group 1 / Grade I victories after running in the Derby.

- Lammtarra – King George VI and Queen Elizabeth Stakes (1995), Prix de l'Arc de Triomphe (1995)
- Court of Honour – Gran Premio del Jockey Club (1995)
- Spectrum – Champion Stakes (1995)

== Subsequent breeding careers ==
Leading progeny of participants in the 1995 Epsom Derby.

=== Sires of Classic winners ===
Spectrum (13th) - Later stood in South Africa

- Golan - 1st 2000 Guineas Stakes (2001)
- Tartan Bearer - 2nd Epsom Derby (2008)
- Gamut - 1st Grand Prix de Saint-Cloud (2004)
- Glencove Marina - 2nd Hennessy Gold Cup (2011)

=== Sires of Group/Grade One winners ===
Vettori (6th)

- St. Basil - 1st Stradbroke Handicap (2005)
- Sound Action - 1st Australasian Oaks(2003)
- Lady Vettori - 3rd Prix Marcel Boussac (1999) - Dam of Lope de Vega
- Hightori - 3rd King George VI and Queen Elizabeth Stakes (2001)

=== Sires of National Hunt horses ===
Presenting (3rd)

- Denman - 1st Cheltenham Gold Cup (2008)
- War Of Attrition - 1st Cheltenham Gold Cup (2006)
- First Lieutenant - 1st Betfred Bowl (2013)
- Knotted Midge - Dam of Might Bite (2nd Cheltenham Gold Cup (2018)

Tamure (2nd)

- Bitofapuzzle - 1st Mares Novice Hurdle Championship Final (2015)
- Get On The Yager - 1st Rowland Meyrick Handicap Chase (2017)
- Thomas Crapper - 1st Greatwood Gold Cup (2017)

Pennekamp (11th)

- Penzance - 1st Triumph Hurdle (2005)
- Camomille - Dam of Camping Ground (1st Relkeel Hurdle 2016, 1st National Spirit Hurdle 2017)
- Pennegale - Dam of Lily Of The Valley (1st Prix de l'Opéra 2010) and Mubtaahij (2nd Dubai World Cup 2016)
- Shadow Song - Dam of Jan Vermeer (3rd Irish Derby 2010) and Together (2nd 1000 Guineas Stakes 2nd Irish 1,000 Guineas 2010)

=== Other Stallions ===
Lammtarra (1st) - Melikah - (2nd Irish Oaks, 3rd Epsom Oaks 2000), Simeon (1st Classic Trial 2002)
'Humbel (8th) - Thetwincamdrift (2nd Prestige Novices' Hurdle 2009)
Fahal (4th) - Exported to South Africa
Court Of Honour (5th) - Exported to South Africa
Riyadian (7th) - Exported to Peru where champion sire - also had spell in Chile
