= 1995 Prix de l'Arc de Triomphe =

1995 Longchamp horse race

- Location: Longchamp Racecourse
- Date: October 1, 1995
- Winning horse: Lammtarra

The 1995 Prix de l'Arc de Triomphe was a horse race held at Longchamp on Sunday 1 October 1995. It was the 74th running of the Prix de l'Arc de Triomphe.

The winner was Lammtarra, a three-year-old colt trained in Great Britain by Saeed bin Suroor. The winning jockey was Frankie Dettori.

== Race details ==
- Sponsor: Forte Group
- Purse: 7,000,000 F; First prize: 4,000,000 F
- Going: Very Soft
- Distance: 2,400 metres
- Number of runners: 16
- Winner's time: 2m 31.8s

Pos.	Marg.	Horse	Age	Jockey	Trainer (Country)
1		Lammtarra	3	Frankie Dettori	Saeed bin Suroor (GB)
2	¾	Freedom Cry	4	Olivier Peslier	André Fabre (FR)
3	2	Swain	3	Michael Kinane	André Fabre (FR)
4	1½	Lando	5	Michael Roberts	Heinz Jentzsch (GER)
5	2½	Pure Grain	3	John Reid	Michael Stoute (GB)
6	½	Carnegie	4	Thierry Jarnet	André Fabre (FR)
7	1	Partipral	6	Guy Guignard	Élie Lellouche (FR)
8	1	Gunboat Diplomacy	4	Dominique Boeuf	Élie Lellouche (FR)
9	8	Carling	3	Thierry Thulliez	Corine Barande-Barbe (FR)
10	snk	Balanchine	4	Walter Swinburn	Saeed bin Suroor (GB)
11	2	El Tenor	3	Stéphane Coerette	Antonio Spanu (FR)
12	3	Tot ou Tard	5	Eric Saint-Martin	Stéphane Wattel (FR)
13	3	Luso	3	Cash Asmussen	Clive Brittain (GB)
14	2½	Strategic Choice	4	Richard Quinn	Paul Cole (GB)
15	½	El Sembrador	4	Guillermo Sena	José Palacios (ARG)
16	5	Sunrise Song	4	Gérald Mossé	François Doumen (FR)

- Abbreviation: snk = short-neck

== Winner's details ==
Further details of the winner, Lammtarra.

- Sex: Colt
- Foaled: 2 February 1992
- Country: United States
- Sire: Nijinsky; Dam: Snow Bride (Blushing Groom)
- Owner: Saeed bin Maktoum Al Maktoum
- Breeder: Gainsborough Farms
