= Thoroughbred breeding theories =

Breeding theories to produce better Thoroughbred racehorses

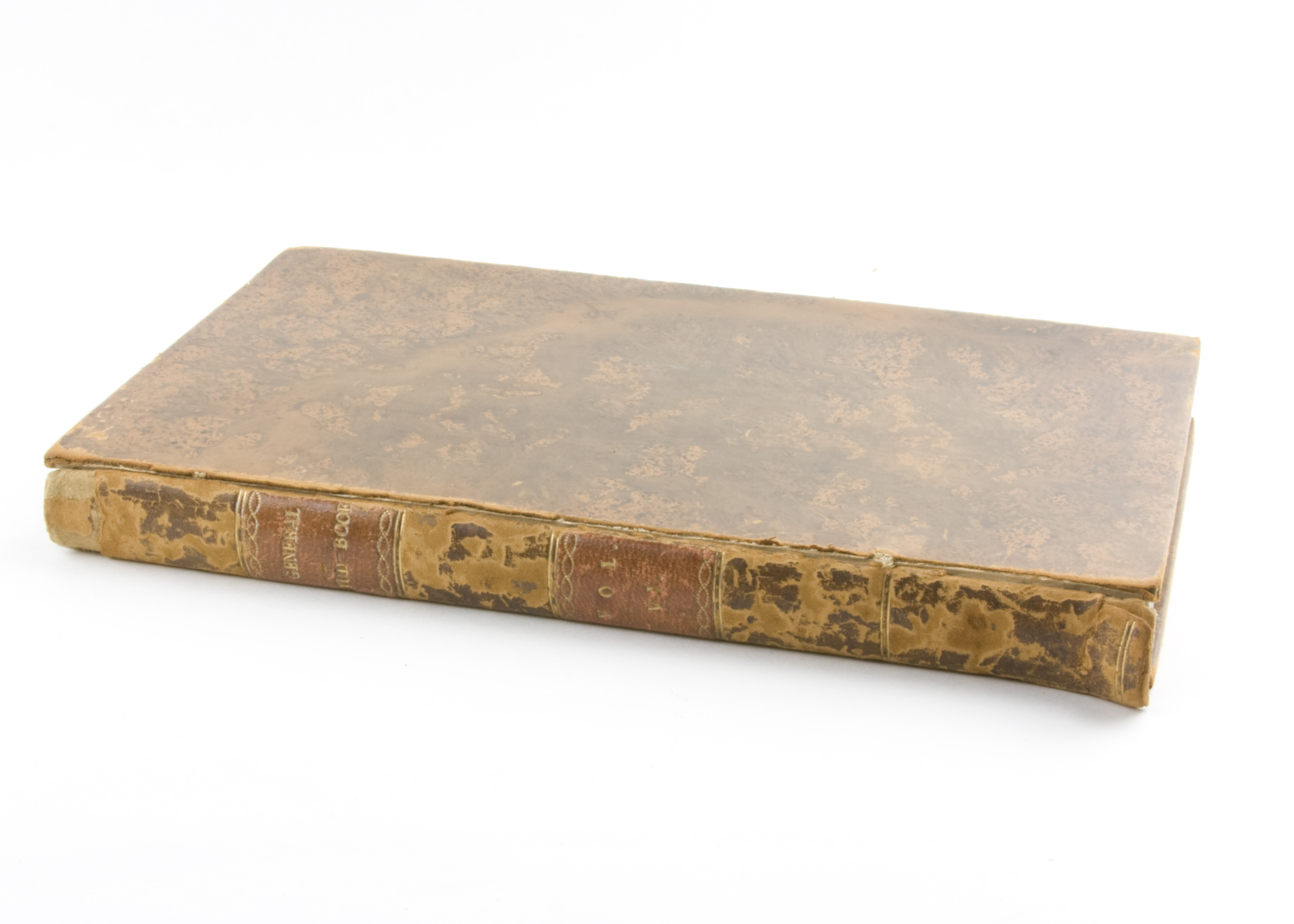
Volume Six of the General Stud Book (1857)

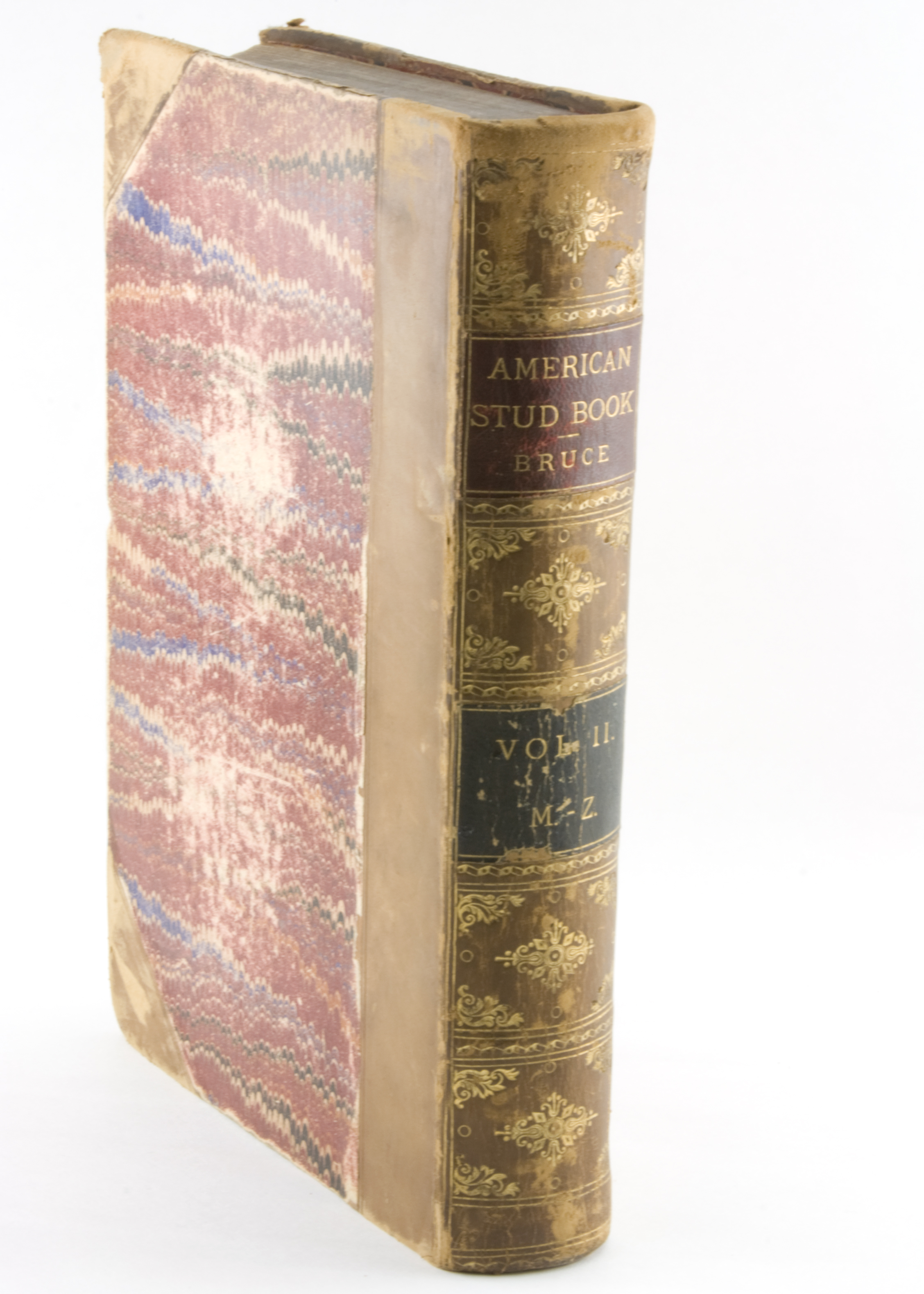
Volume Two of the American Stud Book (1873)

Thoroughbred breeding theories, or racehorse theories, are used by horse breeders in an attempt to arrange matings that produce progeny successful in horse racing. Bloodstock experts also rely on these theories when purchasing young horses or breeding stock. A basic understanding of these theories can also help the racing public understand a horse's theoretical genetic potential. The breeding theories stem from the belief that careful analysis of bloodlines can lend predictability to breeding outcomes. A well-designed mating increases the probability of the offspring's success, although many other factors also come into play.

Many thoroughbred breeding theories are implemented from other animal breeding stock practices, such as the use of inbreeding to "fix a type". Some breeding theories are qualitative, relying on judgement. Quantitative breeding theories usually focus on statistical analysis of the sire and broodmare sires in particular. The best-known classification system for mares was developed in the late 1800s by an Australian named Bruce Lowe, who analyzed the statistics of major race winners and ranked the distaff or mare lines by their degree of success. This and similar ranking systems are still used by some breeders today.

== Breed the best to the best ==
The soundest breeding theory is the simplest one: "Breed the best to the best and hope for the best" is a phrase that probably originated with John E. Madden in the first half of the twentieth century. Studies have proven that, in general, good racehorses make the best breeding stock. While not all top male runners succeed as stallions, it is much more unusual for a poor racehorse to become a good proven sire. A poorly-raced mare does have a better chance to outbreed her own record on the track, especially when she has a good pedigree and is bred to good stock. On the other hand, statistics have shown that high quality racemares produce an inordinately high percent of high class runners.

=== The racecourse test ===
"The Thoroughbred exists because its selection has depended, not on experts, technicians, or zoologists, but on a piece of wood: the winning post of the Epsom Derby. If you base your criteria on anything else, you will get something else, not the Thoroughbred."

— Federico Tesio

The Racecourse Test means that the most important selection criteria for breeding the Thoroughbred is the ability displayed on the racetrack. The Racecourse Test measures a horse's ability to win, which requires a certain combination of speed and stamina depending on the race in question. Racing also tests the horse's strength, soundness and will to win, all of which are heritable to some degree. The ultimate goal is to win elite races, especially The Derby in England or the Kentucky Derby in the United States, and the breed has evolved accordingly. Horses that fail the Racecourse Test, either because they are poor athletes or lack racing spirit, are usually poor candidates as breeding stock. When an unproven racehorse becomes a good sire or broodmare, a further look usually shows that he or she showed tremendous potential in training and was retired due to some untimely circumstance, usually an injury. Such horses usually also have above average pedigrees.

An example of the danger of ignoring the Racecourse Test was Sunday Silence, who firmly established his ability on the racetrack as the 1989 Horse of the Year and thus would ordinarily have been given major opportunities as a sire. But his pedigree was not fashionable and there was little interest in America in breeding to him. Thus he was sold to Japan, where he became the leading sire for thirteen straight years.

== Stallion statistics ==
Because stallions can have hundreds of offspring, it is possible to do statistical analysis to measure their success, which in turn affects their future prospects at stud. The most commonly used is the Average Earnings Index (AEI), which takes the average earnings of all runners for a specific period and evaluates the stallion's average progeny earnings against that figure. A number below 1.00 is below average. A number above 1.00 is above average. Good stallions generally have an AEI of at least 1.50. The advantage of looking at the AEI compared to straight earnings is that the AEI compensates for differences in the number of runners different stallions may have. The AEI can also be used to compare the relative success of sires over different generations, though larger foal crops in recent years have led to a general decrease in the AEI of the best modern sires compared to those of the past.

For context, the AEI should be accompanied by the Comparative Index (CI), which is a way of measuring the quality of the mares to which the stallion was bred. The CI considers all the offspring of the stallion's mates and subtracts out their combined progeny. A stallion with a CI of 2.19 means that when his mares were mated with other sires, the mares produced offspring that averaged 2.19 times the average for the generation in question. If a stallion's AEI is lower than his mares' CI, it is generally a red flag as it suggests that he's not generating the same quality of runners as these mares have produced with other stallions. By contrast, if the stallion's AEI is higher than his mares' CI, the stallion is said to be improving his mares. This generally leads to higher quality mares being bred to him in future years.

Another statistic that is valuable to both the bettor and breeder is the Average Winning Distance (AWD), available through the Online Stallion Register maintained by The Blood-Horse and published in some Past Performance charts. By comparing the values for horses in a given race, a bettor can identify which horses have a more speed oriented pedigree, and which have a more stamina oriented pedigree. From a breeding point of view, stallions with a low AWD number are considered to be speed influences, and may be bred to mares whose broodmare sire has a higher number to inject stamina.

=== Dosage ===
Dosage is a further attempt to quantify the amount of speed versus stamina in a horse's pedigree. Major sires, called chefs-de-race, are placed in one of five categories: Brilliant, Intermediate, Classic, Solid, and Professional. "Brilliant" sires offer the highest speed and least stamina, while "Professional" sires (now quite rare) provide the lowest speed and greatest stamina. A "Classic" sire offers a balance of speed and stamina traditionally associated with winning classic races. For any given horse, the dosage profile is generated by assigning points for each Chef-de-race in the pedigree, with the number of points varying depending on what generation the chef appears in. The Dosage Index can then be calculated, with a higher number meaning the pedigree is more speed-oriented. A Dosage Index of under 4.00 is considered optimal for horses attempting to win classic races. As the Dosage Profile and Index are widely published, breeders may select mates for their mare with these figures in mind, especially if they are intending to sell the foal at auction. As with Average Winning Distance, if the mare has a Dosage Profile oriented to speed, the breeder may look for a sire that provides stamina influences. The resultant foal would then have a superior Dosage Profile.

== The female line ==
Although much attention is paid to the sire line, Thoroughbred horses are also traced through the distaff line, alternately called the mare line or tail-female line. This maternal line is known as a "family". This practice dates to the beginning of the General Stud Book (GSB). This was done because the mares produce far fewer foals than stallions and many leading breeders maintained and built families all tracing to a single mare. However, modern genetic studies have revealed that there are some cases where the haplotype in the mtDNA of modern Thoroughbreds, which should not mutate or alter, differs from the records in the General Stud Book, indicating that some female families contain deep rooted pedigree errors.

Many horses were inbred in the early years of Thoroughbred development, which increased the chances of early horses appearing in many pedigrees today. One example was Old Bald Peg placed in family 6, one of the earliest tap-root dams, having been foaled around 1635. Most, if not all modern Thoroughbreds trace their ancestry to her through one or both sides of their pedigree.

=== Bruce Lowe families ===
Around 1895 an Australian, Bruce Lowe, wrote: "Breeding Racehorses by the Figure System". He formulated a system of family numbers from the mares listed in the General Stud Book. Lowe believed that the three foundation sires of the Thoroughbred were successful largely due to the mares they were bred to, and so predicting race horse quality required identification and assessment of the mare lines.

Lowe stated,

The figures are derived from a statistical compilation of the winners of the three great English classic races, Derby, Oaks and St. Leger. The family with the largest number of wins is No. 1, the next No. 2 and so on up to No. 43, and include families whose descendants have not won a classic race.

During the 1950s Kaziemierz Bobinski and Count Zamoyski produced Family Tables of Racehorses, commonly known as the Bobinski Tables. This work expanded Bruce Lowe's numbering system of 43 families and identified a total of 74 families tracing to mares in the GSB. They identified mares in several countries whose pedigrees had been lost or whose descendants were unacceptable to the GSB at the time of Lowe's work. Bobinski later updated his works and split Lowe's families into sub categories. The current female family tables were updated by Toru Shirai of the Japanese Bloodstock Agency with the latest update occurring in 2004.

=== Analysis and use ===
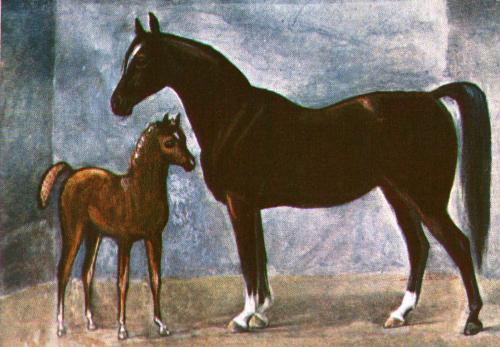
Old Bald Peg, dam of the Old Morocco Mare (c.1655)

Thoroughbred families include the following:
- Families 1-43 are described by Bruce Lowe's Breeding Racehorses by the Figure System
- Families A1-A37 descend from Sanders Bruce's American Stud Book, with mares who cannot be traced to Weatherbys General Stud Book (GSB)
- Families Ar1-Ar2 are Argentine families
- Families B1-B26 trace directly to F.M. Prior's Half-Bred Studbook
- Families C1-C16 are described in the Australian Stud Book as approved Colonial Families
- Families C17-C33 descend from Australian and New Zealand mares who cannot be traced to the GSB
- Families P1-P2 are Polish families

=== Family branches ===
Over time, the influence of the foundation mares of each family becomes diluted by the presence of all the other horses in a given pedigree. On the other hand, some of the younger mares of the family become so influential that a new family is created to separate out their offspring. For example, Family 1 refers to all horses who trace back in the female line to Tregonwell's Natural Barb Mare, foaled c. 1670. It is estimated that about 15% of modern thoroughbreds belong to family 1 as a whole. Five generations of the family later, the mare Bonny Lass (1723) was so influential that a new family 1-a was designated for her descendants. Family 1-a was subsequently split into families 1-d (Promise, 1768) and 1-b (Morel, 1805). The Promise family 1-d spawned further families and so on to the present, where there are now 22 designated branches (1-a to 1-x) within the overall family 1. It takes many generations for the most influential mares to be identified so most of these family branches date back to the 18th and 19th century. The most recent branch was created for descendants of La Troienne (1926), family 1-x.

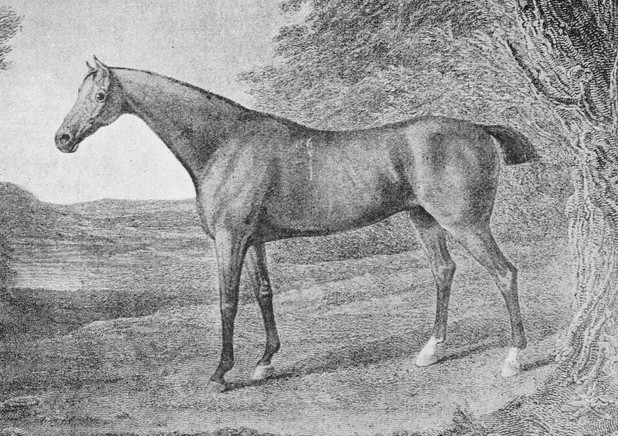
The mare Penelope (foaled 1798) produced two Derby winners, and established family 1-o, a branch of family 1. Her female line descendants established further branches over the following decades

The overall structure of family 1 is as follows:

- Tregonwell's Natural Barb Mare (foundation mare of family 1)
  - was the fifth dam of Bonny Lass (1723, family 1-a)
    - who was the third dam of Promise (1768, family 1-d)
      - who was the dam of Prunella (1788, family 1-e)
        - who was the dam of Penelope (1798, family 1-o)
          - who was the dam of Web (1808, family 1-s)
            - who was the fifth dam of Queen Bertha (1860, family 1-w)
            - Web was also the twelfth dam of La Troienne (1926, family 1-x)
            - and the dam of Trampoline (1825, family 1-t)
              - who was the third dam of Maid of the Glen (1858, family 1-u)
          - Penelope was also the fifth dam of Hilarity (1871, 1-p)
          - and the fourth dam of The Prairie Bird (1844, 1-r)
        - Prunella was also the dam of Pawn (1808, family 1-f)
          - who was the third dam of Ellen Horne (1844, family 1-j)
            - who was the second dam of Paraffin (1870, family 1-l)
              - who was the dam of Footlight (1876, family 1-m)
                - who is second dam of Chelandry (1894, family 1-n)
            - Ellen Horne was also the dam of Rouge Rose (1865, family 1-k)
          - Pawn was also the dam of Problem (1823, family 1-g)
            - who was the fourth dam of Sunshine (1867, family 1-h)
              - who was the dam of Sunray (1874, family 1-i)
    - Bonny Lass was also the fourth dam of Morel (1805, family 1-b)
      - who was the dam of Mustard (1824, family 1-c)

Today, these numbers often follow a horse's name in sale catalogues and pedigrees, much like a numerical surname and are used for checking the accuracy of pedigrees and comparing the contributions made by various mares and families. Horses that come from more highly respected families will usually command better prices than those from less respected bloodlines, although they may not prove to be better as racehorses or sires/broodmares.

== Nicking ==
Specific affinities of stallions of one male line for mares from other sire lines — commonly called nicks — have made a profound impact on the development of the Thoroughbred. Compatibility of stallions from one male line with mares from other sire lines has shaped the breed since the cross of Eclipse with mares by Herod in the late 18th century. These successful crosses – Hermit/Stockwell, Lexington/Glencoe, Bend Or/Macaroni, Phalaris/Chaucer – have made a profound impact on the development of the Thoroughbred. In the modern era, the most successful nick was Danzig with mares by Mr. Prospector, which produced 16 stakes winners from 53 runners, a rate of 30.2%. While modern calculations of nick ratings use more complete databases, there has been criticism of nicks and nick ratings within the Thoroughbred industry. A nick may appear to be successful because of small sample size, based on the success of just one offspring, or because a stallion had significant success with just a few good mares.

== Inbreeding versus outcrossing ==
Inbreeding is the mating of two closely related individuals. It is known as one of the quickest ways to "fix" desired characteristics into a bloodline of any species. The risk is that the inbreeding will reveal negative recessive characteristics; thus, "closebreeding" is usually avoided. Continued inbreeding over a series of generations also has a negative impact referred to as "inbreeding depression". The lines may become dominant for certain characteristics, but the offspring also tend to become weaker, less vigorous individuals than animals that are not as inbred.

In the thoroughbred industry, inbreeding is used to focus specific genes by using superior, prepotent individuals, usually within the fourth and sixth generations. Inbred animals are likely conduits for certain specific characteristics coming from their inbred ancestor. Too much inbreeding is not desirable and rarely produces the superior runner. But inbred animals frequently make outstanding breeding stock because when outcrossed, superior hybrid individuals often result. Secretariat is an example of such hybrid vigor.

== See also ==
- Thoroughbred
- Horse breeding
- Dosage Index
- Inbreeding
- Average Earnings Index (horse racing)
