= Lammtarra =

American-bred Thoroughbred racehorse (1992–2014)

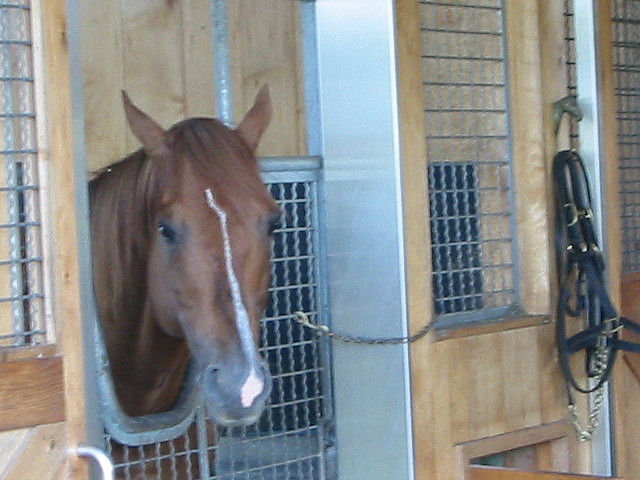
- Lammtarra at the Arrow Stud in 2002.
- Sire: Nijinsky
- Grandsire: Northern Dancer
- Dam: Snow Bride
- Damsire: Blushing Groom
- Sex: Stallion
- Foaled: 2 February 1992
- Country: United States
- Colour: Chestnut
- Breeder: Gainsborough Farms
- Owner: Saeed bin Maktoum al Maktoum
- Trainer: Alex Scott (1994); Saeed bin Suroor (1995)
- Record: 4: 4-0-0
- Earnings: £1,271,075

Major wins
- Washington Singer Stakes (1994); Epsom Derby (1995); K. George VI & Q. Elizabeth Stakes (1995); Prix de l'Arc de Triomphe (1995)

Awards
- European Champion 3-Yr-Old Colt (1995); Timeform rating: 134
- Last updated on 13 March 2025

Lammtarra (2 February 1992 – 7 July 2014) was an American-bred, British-trained Thoroughbred racehorse. He ran only four times and retired undefeated. Lammtarra won three Group One races in 1995, in which year he was voted the Cartier Three-Year-Old European Champion Colt after winning the Derby in record time, the King George VI and Queen Elizabeth Stakes and the Prix de l'Arc de Triomphe. He is one of only two horses to win all three races.

== Breeding ==
The colt was owned by Saeed bin Maktoum al Maktoum, whose father, Sheikh Maktoum, bred Lammtarra at his Gainsborough Farm in Versailles, Kentucky. His breeding was top class, being sired by British Triple Crown winner Nijinsky by Northern Dancer out of Oaks winner, Snow Bride by French 2000 Guineas winner Blushing Groom. He was inbred to Northern Dancer in the second and fourth generations (2m x 4f).

== Racing record ==
Lammtarra won his only race as a two-year-old, in the Washington Singer Stakes at Newbury. As a three-year-old, Lammtarra was trained for the Epsom Derby as his main target.

=== Epsom Derby ===
Racing colours of Saeed Maktoum Al Maktoum

Lammtarra's Derby triumph in June 1995 came just months after the tragic fatal shooting of his young trainer Alex Scott. Scott was killed at his Newmarket stud in September 1994, at the age of 34.

Before his death, Scott had been dreaming of Epsom glory with a two-year-old colt in his care. Indeed, he was so confident of Classic success that he backed the horse before it started, placing £1,000 at 33/1 with Ladbrokes. But after the death of his trainer, the colt was sent to Sheikh Mohammed's Godolphin operation to continue his career.

However, Lammtarra very nearly didn't get to the Derby at all. During the early part of the season, he was a sick horse and his participation was in grave doubt. When he arrived at Epsom on the big day, it was for his seasonal reappearance and his first run in 302 days.

Lammtarra was at 14/1 odds to emulate his sire 25 years earlier, with Walter Swinburn as his jockey. The market was dominated by Andre Fabre's impressive 2,000 Guineas winner Pennekamp (11/8). Second favourite was Peter Chapple-Hyam's Spectrum (11/4), an easy winner of the Irish 2,000 Guineas.

As the field rounded Tattenham Corner, Lammtarra was stuck on the rails towards the rear of the field. With two furlongs left, Walter Swinburn got clear and Lammtarra gathered speed. Frankie Dettori's swoop on 9:1 shot Tamure had seemed certain to carry him to victory, but Lammtarra quickly made up at least six lengths in the last 1 1/2 furlongs. He overtook Tamure deep inside the final furlong and won going away by a length. There were emotional scenes in the winner's enclosure afterwards, as Swinburn and Sheikh Mohammed paid tribute to Alex Scott. Normally, bookmakers will cancel a bet if the person placing it dies. However, Ladbrokes let Scott's ante-post bet on Lammtarra stand and paid the winnings to his widow.

The official time for the race was 2 minutes 32.21 seconds, 1.53 seconds inside the previous Derby best. This time stood for 15 years until 2010, when it was beaten by Workforce with a time of two minutes 31.33s.

=== King George VI and Queen Elizabeth Stakes ===
Lammtarra's next appearance was in the King George VI and Queen Elizabeth Stakes at Ascot. He had a new jockey for this race, Frankie Dettori having replaced Swinburn. A couple of furlongs into the race, Dettori started to improve Lammtarra's position, but trainer Geoff Wragg's Pentire moved up on his outside, seemingly with plenty in hand. Pentire went to the front but only briefly as Lammtarra rallied to get his head back in front and take victory. After the race, Dettori said his mount had the heart of a lion.

=== Prix de l'Arc de Triomphe ===
Lammtarra's final race was the Group One Prix de l'Arc de Triomphe at Longchamps in France. Dettori settled him just off the pace, then rode him to the lead just over two furlongs out. Challengers queued up to take a shot at the English horse, but all failed. Dettori drove Lammtarra home and at the line the 21/10 favourite had three-quarters of a length to spare over Freedom Cry, with Swain two lengths further back in third. Jockey, Dettori said Lammtarra was "possibly" the best horse he's ever ridden. "Maybe Lammtarra is the best, because he remained unbeaten...".

Lammtarra was sent to stud undefeated with a high value.

== Retirement ==
Lammtarra stood his first season at Sheikh Mohammed bin Rashid Al Maktoum's Dalham Hall Stud near Newmarket. At the end of the 1996 breeding season, he was sold to Japanese breeders for $30 million to stand at the largest stallion farm in the Hidaka area for a stud fee of £30,000. His offspring met with limited success and his fee was reduced later to £2,500 with a live foal guarantee. The best of his offspring were probably the Japanese Grade 3 winners Maruka Senryo and Meisho Ramses. Although the foals have not been great performers, mares sired by him are highly sought after, due to Lammtarra's excellent bloodlines. In August 2006, it was announced that Sheikh Mohammed bin Rashid Al Maktoum had bought back Lammtarra from Japan's Arrow Stud and would return to Dalham Hall Stud to live out his days in retirement. On 7 July 2014 it was announced that Lammtarra had died at Dalham Hall the previous day at the age of twenty-two.

== Pedigree ==
Pedigree of Lammtarra (USA), chestnut stallion, 1992
Sire Nijinsky (CAN) 1967	Northern Dancer (CAN); 1961	Nearctic	Nearco
Sire Nijinsky (CAN) 1967	Northern Dancer (CAN); 1961	Nearctic	Lady Angela
Sire Nijinsky (CAN) 1967	Northern Dancer (CAN); 1961	Natalma	Native Dancer
Sire Nijinsky (CAN) 1967	Northern Dancer (CAN); 1961	Natalma	Almahmoud
Sire Nijinsky (CAN) 1967	Flaming Page; 1959	Bull Page	Bull Lea
Sire Nijinsky (CAN) 1967	Flaming Page; 1959	Bull Page	Our Page
Sire Nijinsky (CAN) 1967	Flaming Page; 1959	Flaring Top	Menow
Sire Nijinsky (CAN) 1967	Flaming Page; 1959	Flaring Top	Flaming Top
Dam Snow Bride (USA) 1986	Blushing Groom (FR); 1974	Red God	Nasrullah
Dam Snow Bride (USA) 1986	Blushing Groom (FR); 1974	Red God	Spring Run
Dam Snow Bride (USA) 1986	Blushing Groom (FR); 1974	Runaway Bride	Wild Risk
Dam Snow Bride (USA) 1986	Blushing Groom (FR); 1974	Runaway Bride	Aimée
Dam Snow Bride (USA) 1986	Awaasif (CAN); 1979	Snow Knight	Firestreak
Dam Snow Bride (USA) 1986	Awaasif (CAN); 1979	Snow Knight	Snow Blossom
Dam Snow Bride (USA) 1986	Awaasif (CAN); 1979	Royal Statute	Northern Dancer
Dam Snow Bride (USA) 1986	Awaasif (CAN); 1979	Royal Statute	Queen's Statute

== See also ==
- List of leading Thoroughbred racehorses
