= Ian Lines =

British croquet player (born 1965)

Personal information
- National team: (United Kingdom) Great Britain (since 2004), England
- Born: 1965 (age 59–60)

Sport
- Sport: Croquet
- Club: Bowdon Croquet Club

Ian Lines (born 1965) is an international croquet player. He has played international representative croquet for Great Britain since 2004 and has represented England in the Home Internationals

== Profile ==
Ian started playing croquet in 1993, and won the All England Association Handicap Championship in 1995. More recently, he won the Chairman's Salver in 2004 and played for Great Britain in their successful Solomon Trophy team against the United States in Palm Springs.

Ian's achieved his highest world ranking of ninth in early 2005. During that year he also represented England in the Home Internationals, played in the Plate Final of the British Opens and got through to the knockout stages of the WCF Association World Championships. Although mainly an Association player, Ian won the Lancashire International Golf Croquet Championship in 2005, and was a member of the Lancashire team which won the very first UK Inter-County Golf Championship.

March 2006 sees Ian represent England in the World Golf Croquet Championships in Hawke's Bay, New Zealand.

== Club Activities ==
Ian is a very active member of the Bowdon Croquet Club in Manchester, and is secretary of the NorthWest croquet federation. As well as winning most of the region's A Class tournaments, Ian is a very popular coach and player at Bowdon, and regularly travels around the UK to compete in tournaments.

== See also ==
- History of croquet
