= Jenny Lidback =

Peruvian-born American golfer (born 1963)

Personal information
- Full name: Jenny Lidback
- Nationality: Peru; Sweden; United States
- Born: 30 March 1963 (age 63) Lima, Peru
- Height: 5 ft 5 in (1.65 m)

Career
- Sport: Golf
- College: Texas Christian University; Louisiana State University
- Turned professional: 1986
- Former tours: LPGA Tour (1989–2003); Futures Tour
- Professional wins: 9

Number of wins by tour
- LPGA Tour: 1
- Epson Tour: 8

Best results in LPGA major championships (wins: 1)
- Chevron Championship: T10: 2000
- Women's PGA C'ship: T11: 1999
- U.S. Women's Open: 12th: 1996
- du Maurier Classic: Won: 1995
- Women's British Open: T56: 2001

Achievements and awards
- Futures Tour Player of the Year: 1988

Jenny Lidback (born 30 March 1963) is a professional golfer.

== Early life and amateur career ==
Lidback was born in Lima, Peru in 1963 to Swedish parents. She attended Texas Christian University and Louisiana State University.

== Professional career ==
Lidback's rookie season on the LPGA Tour was 1989. In 1995, her only win on the tour came at one of the major championships, the du Maurier Ltd. Classic. She had her best finish on the money list in the same year, placing 21st. She retired from tournament golf after the 2003 season.

Lidback became a U.S. citizen in May 2003. Her nephew, Roberto Castro, plays on the PGA Tour.

== Professional wins (9) ==
=== LPGA Tour wins (1) ===
Legend
LPGA Tour major championships (1)
Other LPGA Tour (0)

No.	Date	Tournament	Winning score	Margin of victory	Runner-up
1	Aug 27, 1995	du Maurier Classic	−8 (71-69-68-72=280)	1 stroke	(Sweden) Liselotte Neumann

LPGA Tour playoff record (0–1)

No.	Year	Tournament	Opponents	Result
1	1998	Sara Lee Classic	(United States) Donna Andrews (United States) Nancy Lopez (United States) Barb Mucha	Mucha won with birdie on second extra hole

=== Futures Tour wins (8) ===
- 1986 (1) Cape Coral Classic
- 1987 (3) Paradise Island Classic, Spring Valley Lake Classic, Oronoque Village Classic
- 1988 (4) Cheval Classic, Imperial Lakes Classic, Lake Eufaula Classic, Bob Barbour Toyota Classic

== Major championships ==
=== Wins (1) ===
Year	Championship	Winning score	Margin	Runner-up
1995	du Maurier Classic	−8 (71-69-68-72=280)	1 stroke	(Sweden) Liselotte Neumann

=== Results timeline ===
Tournament	1984	1985	1986	1987	1988	1989	1990
Nabisco Championship							
LPGA Championship						CUT	CUT
U.S. Women's Open	CUT						
du Maurier Classic						CUT	T75

Tournament	1991	1992	1993	1994	1995	1996	1997	1998	1999	2000
Nabisco Championship						CUT	T43	T55	CUT	T10
LPGA Championship	T64	CUT	T17	T28	T38	CUT	T43	T21	T11	T28
U.S. Women's Open			CUT			12	T43	T19	T55	T31
du Maurier Classic	CUT	CUT	T21	T16	1	T56	T37	T41	CUT	T33

Tournament	2001	2002
Nabisco Championship	T48	
LPGA Championship	T47	CUT
U.S. Women's Open	CUT	CUT
Women's British Open ^	T56	

^ The Women's British Open replaced the du Maurier Classic as an LPGA major in 2001.

Win
Top 10
Did not play

CUT = missed the half-way cut.
T = tied

=== Summary ===
Tournament	Wins	2nd	3rd	Top-5	Top-10	Top-25	Events	Cuts made
Nabisco Championship	0	0	0	0	1	1	6	4
LPGA Championship	0	0	0	0	0	3	14	9
U.S. Women's Open	0	0	0	0	0	2	9	5
du Maurier Classic	1	0	0	1	1	3	12	8
Women's British Open	0	0	0	0	0	0	1	1
Totals	1	0	0	1	2	9	42	27

- Most consecutive cuts made – 10 (1990 U.S. Open – 1998 du Maurier Classic)
- Longest streak of top-10s – 1 (twice)

== Team appearances ==
Professional

- Handa Cup (representing World team): 2008, 2009, 2010, 2011, 2012 (tie), 2013 (winners), 2014, 2015
