= Tagliabue =

Tagliabue (Italian pronunciation: [taʎʎaˈbuːe]) is an Italian surname literally translating to 'ox-chopper'. Notable people with the surname include:

- Benedetta Tagliabue (born 1963), Italian architect
- Carlo Tagliabue (1898–1978), Italian baritone
- Elena Tagliabue (born 1977), Italian alpine skier
- Gerald Tagliabue (1935–2016), Australian rules footballer
- Paola Tagliabue (born 1976), Italian free diver
- Paul Tagliabue (1940–2025), American NFL commissioner
- Sebastián Tagliabúe (born 1985), Argentine-Emirati football player
