= 1995 du Maurier Classic =

Golf tournament

Coordinates: 45.444039°N 73.830811°W

The 1995 du Maurier Classic was contested from August 24–27 at Beaconsfield Golf Club. It was the 23rd edition of the du Maurier Classic, and the 17th edition as a major championship on the LPGA Tour.

This event was won by Jenny Lidback.

== Final leaderboard ==
Place	Player	Score	To par	Money (US$)
1	(Peru) (Sweden) Jenny Lidback	71-69-68-72=280	−8	150,000
2	(Sweden) Liselotte Neumann	71-66-72-72=281	−7	93,093
3	(United States) Juli Inkster	72-71-70-70=283	−5	67,933
4	(United States) Tammie Green	75-71-68-70=284	−4	52,837
T5	(United States) Jane Geddes	71-73-69-72=285	−3	38,998
T5	(United States) Betsy King	76-70-67-72=285	−3	38,998
T7	(United States) Michelle Estill	73-77-69-67=286	−2	27,928
T7	(United States) Laurie Rinker	71-71-70-74=286	−2	27,928
T9	(Sweden) Helen Alfredsson	76-70-70-71=287	−1	21,314
T9	(United States) Danielle Ammaccapane	76-71-68-72=287	−1	21,314
T9	(United States) Hollis Stacy	73-73-69-72=287	−1	21,314
