= Average earnings index (horse racing) =

Average earnings index (AEI) is a popular statistic used in North American Thoroughbred horse breeding. It is used to put the earnings of a breeding animal's progeny into proper perspective.

== Method ==
The average earnings index measures the earning power of a stallion or mare's offspring by comparing the average earnings of a given horse's progeny with all other runners of the same age that raced in the same country in a given period of time. The average is stated as a value of 1.00. The AEI is calculated for each year a horse has offspring racing and can be averaged for all years that horse has had first generation descendants on the track.

The AEI can be used for additional comparisons, such as the composite AEI of a sire or damsire based on all of his progeny. Another way it is used is to compare stallions from one generation to the next, because it compensates for the changing value of currency over time.

== Development ==
The AEI was developed in 1948 by Joe Estes of The Blood-Horse magazine. It originally could only be used to calculate numbers for sires and, beginning in the 1950s, broodmare sires. It was only with the addition of computer power beginning in the 1970s and 1980s that a full analysis of mares could be added to the equations and determine the AEI for various crosses.

== Criticism ==
Although considered by some an industry standard, the AEI is criticized as easily skewed by the influence of a single exceptional horse in a given year and favors horses that throw "durable types" of horses that have multiple starts in a given year, including at lower-level races.

== Examples ==
A stallion's career AEI can be found by looking up the pedigree of any of their offspring in The Jockey Club's online pedigree database, equineline.com. The AEI figures for various leading American sires are:

- Bold Ruler (leading sire from 1963 to 1969 and 1973) – 7.86
- Nasrullah (1955, 1956, 1959, 1960) – 5.81
- Alydar (1990) – 5.11
- Nijinsky – 4.49
- Bull Lea (1947-9, 1952–3) – 4.37
- Northern Dancer (1971, 1977) – 4.11
- Danzig (1991-3) – 3.93
- Mr. Prospector (1987-8) – 3.91
- Storm Cat (1999, 2000) – 2.95
- Halo (1983, 1989) - 2.91
- A.P. Indy (2003, 2006) – 2.88

As noted above, a stallion's career AEI can be found by looking up the pedigree of any of their offspring in The Jockey Club's online pedigree database, equineline.com. Sunday Silence's career AEI, according to the Jockey Club's online pedigree database (which includes all career earnings throughout the entire world), equineline.com, is 2.55. Sunday Silence's career AEI, according to Racing Post, is 2.15. However Racing Post warns details of horses trained outside GB and Ireland may be incomplete.

== See also ==
- Thoroughbred breeding theories
