= Effervescing (horse) =

American-bred Thoroughbred racehorse

- Sire: Le Fabuleux
- Grandsire: Wild Risk
- Dam: Sparkling
- Damsire: Bold Ruler
- Sex: Stallion
- Foaled: 1973
- Country: United States
- Colour: Chestnut
- Breeder: Ogden Phipps
- Owner: Mel Hatley & Albert Yank
- Trainer: John W. Russell; D. Wayne Lukas (age 5)
- Record: 28:12-3-4
- Earnings: $505,870.

Major wins
- Man o' War Stakes (1976); Round Table Handicap (1976); Sword Dancer Handicap (1977); American Handicap (1978); Citation Handicap (1978); Eddie Read Handicap (1978)
- Last updated on January 27, 2008

Effervescing (foaled 1973 in Kentucky) is an American Thoroughbred racehorse. Effervescing was a stakes winner at the age 3, 4 and 5 he was one of the first successful trainees by D. Wayne Lukas.

== Background ==
Bred by Ogden Phipps, Effervescing was a son of the French sire Le Fabuleux whose other significant progeny included American multiple Grade I winner, The Bart and Dauphin Fabuleux, the 1984 Canadian Horse of the Year. He was out of the American mare, Sparkling whose U.S. Racing Hall of Fame sire Bold Ruler was an inductee and the Leading sire in North America eight times.

== Racing career ==
At the age of three, at longshot odds of 24-1, Effervescing won the $112,500 Man O' War Stakes on Belmont Park's turf course on October 11, 1976

At age four, he won at Saratoga Race Course in the turf-run Sword Dancer Handicap with future Hall of Fame jockey Ángel Cordero Jr. up.

At the age of five, Effervescing won two $100,000+ purse stakes races within one week. He was victorious in the $110,500 American Handicap, a Grade 2 race on turf, by 3 lengths, and then in the Citation Handicap on dirt, both at Hollywood Park on July 4 and July 10, 1978, respectively. Laffit Pincay Jr. was the jockey for both efforts.

According to Lukas' autobiography "D. Wayne", after the American Handicap, Albert Yank, one of the owners, wanted to run the horse in a stakes race in Chicago later in the fall. When Lukas said he wanted to run the horse back in five days instead, the reply was, Are you drinking your own bathwater?. Yank gave in after Lukas held his ground.

Effervescing won the Eddie Read Handicap (a turf race at 9 furlongs) at Del Mar Racetrack also in 1978 with Pincay his rider again.

== Stud record ==
Effervescing stood at Ashford Stud in Kentucky. He is the sire of two Champions and sixteen stakes winners, with earnings of 4,674,623
