= Karabas (horse) =

French-bred Thoroughbred racehorse (1965–2000)?

- Sire: Worden
- Grandsire: Wild Risk
- Dam: Fair Share
- Damsire: Tantieme
- Sex: Stallion
- Foaled: 1965
- Country: France
- Colour: Bay
- Breeder: W. J. Mitchell
- Owner: Lord Iveagh
- Trainer: Bernard van Cutsem
- Record: 25: 11–4–1
- Earnings: $255,666

Major wins
- Warren Stakes (1968); Prix du Conseil Municipal (1969); La Coupe de Maisons-Laffitte (1969); Washington D.C. International (1969); Hardwicke Stakes (1970); Scarbrough Stakes (1970); Timeform rating: 132
- Last updated on 23 July 2024

Karabas (born 1965) was a French-bred, British-trained Thoroughbred racehorse and sire. Ridden by Lester Piggott, he emulated his sire Worden by winning the Washington D.C. International in 1969. In that race he beat American champion Hawaii into second place and earned $100,000 for his owner.

== Racing career ==
Karabas won 11 races in 4 countries, including the Washington D.C. International, Prix du Conseil Municipal, La Coupe de Maisons-Laffitte, Hardwicke Stakes, and Scarbrough Stakes. He also finished second in the Eclipse Stakes and third in the King Edward VII Stakes. During his racing career, Karabas was trained by Bernard van Cutsem.

Karabas ran in the Washington D.C. International to fill in for his stablemate Park Top and paid $9.20 for the win.

== Stud career ==
Karabas entered stud in 1971. Karabas was exported to Brazil in 1978 to stand at Haras São José e Expedictus.

Karabas was ranked 45th on the São Paulo general leading sire list for 1985.

According to the Brazilian Studbook, Karabas sired 231 foals, including 124 winners (53.7%) and 9 stakes winners (3.9%). According to records kept by the Jockey Club, Karabas sired 262 foals, including 60 winners (22.9%) and 12 stakes winners (4.6%). His Average Earnings Index was 1.33.

As a broodmare sire, the Jockey Club records 584 foals, including 25 stakes winners, with an Average Earnings Index of 1.22.

=== Notable progeny ===
- Tarona, leading two-year-old filly in France in 1977 and winner of the 1977 Criterium des Pouliches
- Heracleon, two-time winner of the Grande Prêmio Presidente da República

=== Notable progeny of daughters ===
- Canzone, winner of the Grande Prêmio São Paulo and Grande Prêmio Henrique Possolo
- Plus Vite, winner of the Grande Prêmio OSAF and Grande Prêmio Henrique Possolo
- Teeran, winner of the Grande Prêmio Mathias Machline
- Verinha, winner of the Grande Prêmio Diana and Grande Prêmio José Guathemozin Nogueira
- Cristie, winner of the Grande Prêmio Barão de Piracicaba
- Ozanam, winner of the Grande Prêmio Francisco Eduardo de Paula Machado
- Mashkour, winner of the San Juan Capistrano Invitational

== Pedigree ==
Pedigree of Karabas (GB), bay stallion, foaled 1965
Sire Worden (FR) 1949	Wild Risk (FR); 1940	Rialto (FR)	Rabelais (GB)
Sire Worden (FR) 1949	Wild Risk (FR); 1940	Rialto (FR)	La Grelee (FR)
Sire Worden (FR) 1949	Wild Risk (FR); 1940	Wild Violet (FR)	Blandford* (IRE)
Sire Worden (FR) 1949	Wild Risk (FR); 1940	Wild Violet (FR)	Wood Violet (FR)
Sire Worden (FR) 1949	Sans Tares (GB); 1939	Sind (GB)	Solario (IRE)
Sire Worden (FR) 1949	Sans Tares (GB); 1939	Sind (GB)	Mirawala (IRE)
Sire Worden (FR) 1949	Sans Tares (GB); 1939	Tara (FR)	Teddy*(FR)
Sire Worden (FR) 1949	Sans Tares (GB); 1939	Tara (FR)	Jean Gow (GB)
Dam Fair Share (GB) 1957	Tantième (FR); 1947	Deux-Pour-Cent (FR)	Deiri (FR)
Dam Fair Share (GB) 1957	Tantième (FR); 1947	Deux-Pour-Cent (FR)	Dix Pour Cent (FR)
Dam Fair Share (GB) 1957	Tantième (FR); 1947	Terka (FR)	Indus (FR)
Dam Fair Share (GB) 1957	Tantième (FR); 1947	Terka (FR)	La Furka* (FR)
Dam Fair Share (GB) 1957	Fair Linda (GB); 1946	Fair Trial (GB)	Fairway (GB)
Dam Fair Share (GB) 1957	Fair Linda (GB); 1946	Fair Trial (GB)	Lady Juror (GB)
Dam Fair Share (GB) 1957	Fair Linda (GB); 1946	Ortlinde (GB)	Hyperion (GB)
Dam Fair Share (GB) 1957	Fair Linda (GB); 1946	Ortlinde (GB)	Brunhild* (FR)

* Karabas is inbred 4S x 5D to the stallion Blandford, meaning that he appears fourth generation on the sire side of his pedigree and fifth generation (via La Furka) on the dam side of his pedigree.

* Karabas is inbred 4S x 5D to the stallion Teddy, meaning that he appears fourth generation on the sire side of his pedigree and fifth generation (via Brunhild) on the dam side of his pedigree.
