= Snow Bride =

American-bred Thoroughbred racehorse

- Racing silks of Saeed Maktoum Al Maktoum
- Sire: Blushing Groom
- Grandsire: Red God
- Dam: Awaasif
- Damsire: Snow Knight
- Sex: Filly
- Foaled: 1986
- Country: United States
- Colour: Chestnut
- Breeder: Darley Stud Management Co. Ltd.
- Owner: Sheikh Mohammed; Saeed Maktoum Al Maktoum
- Trainer: Henry Cecil
- Record: 7: 5-0-0
- Earnings: £170,881

Major wins
- Musidora Stakes (1989); Epsom Oaks (1989); Princess Royal Stakes (1989)
- Last updated on October 12, 2008

Snow Bride (1986 in Kentucky – 2009) was a British Thoroughbred race horse and broodmare.

== Background ==
Snow Bride was a chestnut mare bred in the United States by Darley Stud Management Co. Ltd. She was sired by Blushing Groom.

== Racing career ==
She raced as a two-year-old in the colours of Sheikh Mohammed and was trained at Warren Place, Newmarket, Suffolk United Kingdom by Henry Cecil. In 1989 Snow Bride was transferred to the ownership of Saeed Maktoum al-Maktoum. She is in the record books as having won The Oaks in 1989 by disqualification after the Aga Khan's winning filly Aliysa tested positive for a camphor derivative, a banned substance.

== Breeding record ==
1991 Mousquet (USA) : chestnut filly, by Shadeed (USA) - unraced

1992 Lammtarra (USA) : chestnut colt, foaled 2 February, sired by Nijinsky (CAN) - Unbeaten in four starts including G1 Derby Stakes, Epsom; G1 King George VI & Queen Elizabeth Stakes, Ascot; G1 Prix de l'Arc de Triomphe, Longchamp in England & France 1994–95

1993 Kammtarra (USA) : chestnut colt, foaled 3 February, by Zilzal (USA) - won 4 times including 2 Listed Races in Dubai and placed 3 times from 10 starts in England and Dubai 1996–97

1994 Haltarra (USA) : chestnut colt (gelded), foaled 5 February, by Zilzal (USA) - won twice and placed 7 times including 2nd LR Newmarket S, Newmarket from 16 starts in England and Dubai 1996–2001

1995 Meniatarra (USA) : chestnut filly, foaled 9 February, by Zilzal (USA) - Unplaced in two starts in France 1997–98

1996 Saytarra (USA) : bay filly, foaled 16 February, by Seeking The Gold (USA) - unbeaten in 2 starts including G3 Prix d'Aumale, Chantilly in England and France 1998

1997 Ya Tarra (GB) : chestnut filly, foaled 5 March, by Unbridled (USA) - placed once from 2 starts in England 2000

2000 Qais (USA) : bay colt, foaled 16 February, by Seeking The Gold (USA) - won 4 races and placed 3 times, 2nd G2 Godolphin Mile, Nad Al Sheba; 3rd LR Maserati Burj Nahaar, Nad Al Sheba, 3rd LR Coronado's Quest S, Belmont from 7 starts in the US and Dubai 2003–2005

2001 Royal Lustre (GB) : bay colt (gelded), foaled 5 March, by Deputy Minister (USA) - placed 5 times from 17 starts on the flat in England 2004–08; unplaced both starts over hurdles in England 2005

2003 Abhisheka (IRE) : bay filly, foaled 24 February, by Sadler's Wells(USA) - won 3 races and placed 3 times; 2nd LR Balanchine S, Nad Al Sheba, Dubai; 4th G3 Dahlia S, Newmarket; 4th LR Gillies Fillies S, Windsor; from 10 starts in England and Dubai

2004 Snow Ballerina (GB) : bay filly, foaled 4 March, by Sadler's Wells (USA) - placed 4th once from 4 starts in England 2006–07

2006 Concordia (GB) : chestnut filly, foaled 3 February, by Pivotal (GB) - won once and placed once from 5 starts
