= Nijinsky (horse) =

Canadian-bred Thoroughbred racehorse (1967–1992)

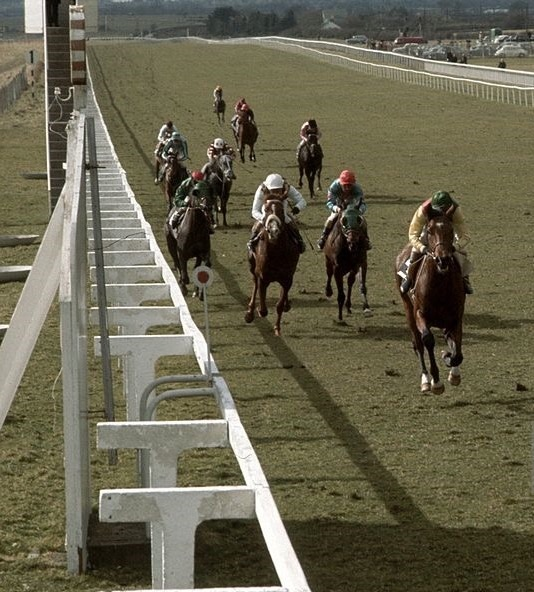
- Nijinsky (Liam Ward) winning the Gladness Stakes at the Curragh in April 1970
- Sire: Northern Dancer
- Grandsire: Nearctic
- Dam: Flaming Page
- Damsire: Bull Page
- Sex: Stallion
- Foaled: 21 February 1967; Windfields Farm; Oshawa, Ontario, Canada
- Died: 15 April 1992 (aged 25)
- Country: Canada
- Colour: Bay
- Breeder: Windfields Farm
- Owner: Charles W. Engelhard Jr.
- Racing colours
- Trainer: Vincent O'Brien
- Record: 13: 11–2–0
- Earnings: $677,177

Major wins
- Railway Stakes (1969); Anglesey Stakes (1969); Beresford Stakes (1969); Dewhurst Stakes (1969); Gladness Stakes (1970); 2,000 Guineas (1970); Epsom Derby (1970); Irish Derby (1970); King George VI and Queen Elizabeth Stakes (1970); St. Leger Stakes (1970)

Awards
- 15th UK Triple Crown Champion (1970); Timeform Horse of the Year (1970); British Horse of the Year (1970); Leading sire in GB & Ireland (1986); North American leading broodmare sire (1993 & 1994)

Honours
- 1970 Motion Picture – A Horse Called Nijinsky; Canadian Horse Racing Hall of Fame (1976); Nijinsky Stakes (Canada); Nijinsky Stakes (Ireland); Derrinstown Stud Derby Trial; Timeform rating: 138
- Last updated on 28 March 2022

Nijinsky (21 February 1967 – 15 April 1992) was a Canadian-bred, Irish-trained champion Thoroughbred racehorse and sire. He was the outstanding two-year-old in Europe in 1969 when he was unbeaten in five races. In the following season, he became the first horse in thirty-five years to win the English Triple Crown, a feat that has not been repeated since. He is regarded as one of the greatest European flat racehorses of the 20th century.

He was also historically important for establishing the international reputation of his sire Northern Dancer, though Nijinsky was atypical of Northern Dancer progeny in size and conformation. Retired to stud, he became the leading sire in Great Britain & Ireland and the leading broodmare sire in North America. As a winner of top-class races from 6 to 14 furlongs, Nijinsky is also considered to be among the most versatile of the great horses of the 20th century. Long-time commentator Brough Scott called Nijinsky "the supreme equine athlete ... the one everything has to be measured against.

== Background ==
Nijinsky, a bay horse with a white heart on his forehead and three white feet, was bred at E. P. Taylor's Windfields Farm in Oshawa, Ontario, Canada. He was from the second crop of foals sired by Northern Dancer, the winner of the 1964 Kentucky Derby who went on to become one of the most influential sires of the 20th century. His dam, Flaming Page, by Bull Page, was a successful racemare, winning the 1962 Queen's Plate. At stud, she produced only two other foals. One of these was Fleur by Victoria Park, who produced the 1977 Epsom Derby winner The Minstrel by Northern Dancer; the other was Minsky, champion Irish two-year-old in 1970 and full brother to Nijinsky. Nijinsky was a powerful and handsome horse with great presence, "a massive brute but as classy and light on his feet as his legendary namesake", said Brough Scott. Standing 16.3 hands (67 inches, 170 cm) high, he resembled his dam rather than his sire in stature and conformation, traits he tended to pass on to his offspring.

He was offered for sale at the Windfields Farm's annual yearling auction where he was bought for $84,000 (equivalent to $780,000 in 2025) by the American minerals magnate and industrialist Charles W. Engelhard Jr., acting on the advice of the Irish trainer Vincent O'Brien. It was Engelhard's wife Jane who decided that the colt should be named after the dancer Vaslav Nijinsky. Nijinsky was shipped to Ireland, where he was trained by O'Brien at Ballydoyle, County Tipperary.

== Racing career ==
=== 1969: two-year-old season ===
Nijinsky's first four races were all at the Curragh. In June, he started at odds of 4/11 and won the six-furlong Erne maiden race easily. He followed up with wins in the Anglesey Stakes and the Railway Stakes. On his fourth appearance, he was extended for the first time in the Beresford Stakes. He won decisively from Decies, a colt who went on to win the Irish 2000 Guineas in 1970. Having proved himself the best of the Irish two-year-olds, he was sent to England in October to contest the Dewhurst Stakes at Newmarket. Ridden for the first time by Lester Piggott, he was held up at the back of the six-horse field before moving through easily to take the lead inside the final furlong, earning top rating in the British Free Handicap.

=== 1970: three-year-old season ===
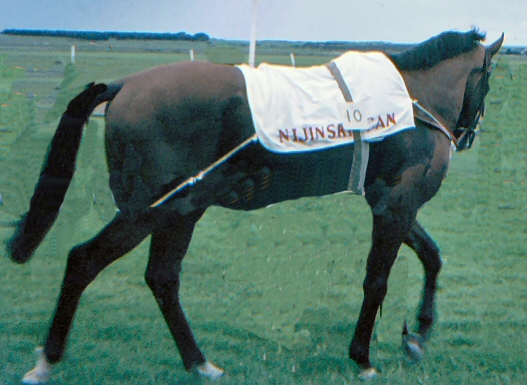
Nijinsky at the 1970 Irish Derby

==== Spring ====
On his first appearance as a three-year-old, Nijinsky beat the four-year-old Deep Run in the Gladness Stakes at the Curragh in April. The colt was then sent back to Newmarket for the 2000 Guineas over one mile. He started the 4/7 favourite against thirteen opponents. Nijinsky took the lead two furlongs from the finish and, without being put under any pressure by Piggott, pulled clear to win by two and a half lengths from Yellow God. The second had won the Ascot 2,000 Guineas trial and the previous year's Gimcrack Stakes, as well as finishing a close second in the Middle Park Stakes.

==== Summer ====
Nijinsky's opposition in the Derby at Epsom was stronger and he started at odds of 11/8 – the only time he was ever odds against. His rivals were headed by the French-trained colts Stintino and Gyr. The veteran French trainer Etienne Pollet had delayed his retirement for a year to guide Gyr, a son of his champion Sea-Bird, through his three-year-old season. Nijinsky was held up by Piggott as usual before moving forward in the straight, by which time Gyr was in front and pulling clear of the Prix Lupin winner, Stintino. A furlong and a half from the finish, Piggott used his whip on Nijinsky. The favourite responded immediately, catching Gyr in a few strides and pulling ahead to win from him by two and a half lengths, with Stintino third.

The winning time of 2:34.68 was the fastest Epsom Derby since 1936. Nijinsky's time for the last two furlongs of the race (10.6 and 11.25 seconds, respectively) was of sprint championship-winning standard. Piggott claimed that he was "always cantering", while Bill Williamson, who rode Gyr, said that "Nijinsky was just too good". Gyr subsequently franked the form by easily winning the Grand Prix de Saint-Cloud.

On the day before the Derby, Nijinsky had overcome a severe bout of colic which could have threatened his life.

On 27 June, Nijinsky followed up his Epsom win by taking the Irish Derby at the Curragh. Ridden by Liam Ward, he started at odds of 4/11 and accelerated late to win by three lengths from Meadowville. In July, Nijinsky raced against older horses in the King George VI and Queen Elizabeth Stakes at Ascot. His five opponents included winners of major races: Blakeney (1969 Epsom Derby), Karabas (Washington, D.C. International Stakes), Crepellana (Prix de Diane) and Caliban (Coronation Cup). Without being extended, Nijinsky moved through to take the lead a furlong from the finish and won by two lengths from Blakeney despite being eased down to a canter in the closing stages.

In August, Nijinsky contracted ringworm, which seriously affected his training schedule. The horse lost most of the hair on his body.

==== Autumn ====
Nijinsky appeared to be recovering after being placed on a "rich" diet including raw eggs and Irish Stout, and was sent to Doncaster for the St. Leger in September. In the one mile and six furlongs race, he was attempting to become the first horse since Bahram 35 years earlier to complete the English Triple Crown. He started the 2/7 favourite and won comfortably, his margin of victory over Meadowville being one length. As of 2026, he is the last horse to accomplish the feat of sweeping the English Triple Crown: since 1970 only Reference Point (1987), Nashwan (1989), Sea The Stars (2009) and Camelot (2012) have won two of the three races.

In his next race, Nijinsky was sent to France for the Prix de l'Arc de Triomphe at Longchamp in Paris in October. Having kept Nijinsky well to the rear, at least 10 lengths back, Piggott produced him in the straight but was baulked twice before making his run on the wide outside. However, 150m from the finish Nijinsky caught front runners Miss Dan and Sassafras and took a slight lead. In the last strides, Nijinsky appeared to veer left away from Piggott's whip and Sassafras, ridden by Yves Saint-Martin, produced a renewed effort to regain the advantage and win by a head. Many, including trainer Vincent O'Brien, felt that Piggott had lost ground on Nijinsky, drawn unfavourably on the wide outside, throughout the race, given the colt far too much ground to make up and left his challenge too late while all the while Sassafras had taken the shortest possible route. Piggott, who was heavily criticised by the media and racing public, said that in his opinion Nijinsky was past his peak for the year. It is beyond dispute that Nijinsky was a most unlucky loser. Piggott commented: "Certainly Nijinsky would have won had he not swerved almost in the shadow of the post, and certainly he would have won had his initial finishing run not been blocked on the final bend".

Less than two weeks after his first, Nijinsky ran his last race in the Champion Stakes over ten furlongs at Newmarket. Although he had been known to sweat freely before some of his previous races, Nijinsky on this occasion appeared to become particularly nervous and anxious before the start. In the race itself, he ran well below his best form and was beaten 3/4 length at odds of 4/11 by the five-year-old English horse Lorenzaccio. O'Brien on this occasion concurred with Piggott, saying that Nijinsky appeared to have "lost his fire." Nijinsky was retired to stand at stud at Claiborne Farm near Paris, Kentucky, having been syndicated in August for $5,440,000.

== Assessment and honours ==
Nijinsky was given a rating of 138 by Timeform, the second-highest for a winner of the Epsom Derby up to that time. He was Timeform's Horse of the Year for 1970. Nijinsky was also voted British Horse of the Year by the Racecourse Association, gaining 38 of the 40 votes.

In 2018 Nijinsky was rated the greatest-ever Epsom Derby winner by a panel of experts assembled by the Daily Telegraph. In 2021, the Sporting Life ranked Nijinsky's Derby win no. 1, ahead of Sea Bird, in their top-40 runnings of the race. In their book A Century of Champions, John Randall and Tony Morris rated Nijinsky as a "great" Derby winner and the best Irish racehorse of the 20th century. In inducting Nijinsky in 2021, the British Racing Hall of Fame observed: "Racehorses with the speed to beat the best over eight furlongs in the 2000 Guineas at Newmarket in May; the prowess to then succeed over 12 furlongs in the Derby at Epsom the following month; before prevailing over an extended 14 furlongs in the St Leger at Doncaster in September are the rarest of breeds".

Vincent O'Brien named Nijinsky and Sir Ivor as the best horses he had trained, placing Nijinsky first "for brilliance." Lester Piggott concurred: "I think Nijinsky probably on his day was the most brilliant horse I've ever ridden". Piggott added later that Nijinsky, during the summer of 1970 when he won the 2,000 Guineas, Epsom Derby, Irish Derby and King George VI and Queen Elizabeth II Stakes, was "an unbeatable horse" Piggott was adamant, however, that running in the St Leger led to the horse not winning at Longchamp.

In 1970, a film was made about his racing career entitled A Horse Called Nijinsky. Narrated by Orson Welles, it was released in British cinemas and in 1988 released on VHS video. The Nijinsky team also was voted winners of the 1970 BBC Sports Personality of the Year Team Award. Among the more unusual tributes, a Cabernet Sauvignon wine and a variety of winter wheat have been named in Nijinsky's honour. Bronze statues of him stand at Ballydoyle and at The Curragh racecourse.

Nijinsky's full race record is listed below.

Date	Racecourse	Distance	Race	Jockey	Weight	Odds	Field	Result	Margin
12 Jul 69	Curragh	6 furlongs	Erne Stakes	L Ward	9-0	4/11f	5	1st	3/4 length
16 Aug 69	Curragh	6 furlongs 63 yds	Railway Stakes	L Ward	8-7	4/9f	7	1st	5 lengths
30 Aug 69	Curragh	6 furlongs 63 yds	Anglesey Stakes	L Ward	9-0	4/9f	6	1st	3 lengths
27 Sep 69	Curragh	1 mile	Beresford Stakes	L Ward	9-0	2/7f	7	1st	3/4 length
17 Oct 69	Newmarket	7 furlongs	Dewhurst Stakes	L Piggott	8-12	1/3f	6	1st	3 lengths
04 Apr 70	Curragh	7 furlongs	Gladness Stakes	L Ward	8-10	4/6f	6	1st	4 lengths
29 Apr 70	Newmarket	1 mile	2000 Guineas	L Piggott	9-0	4/7f	14	1st	2 1/2 lengths
03 Jun 70	Epsom	1 1/2 miles	Epsom Derby	L Piggott	9-0	11/8f	11	1st	2 1/2 lengths
27 Jun 70	Curragh	1 1/2 miles	Irish Sweeps Derby	L Ward	9-0	4/11f	13	1st	3 lengths
25 Jul 70	Ascot	1 1/2 miles	King George VI & Queen Elizabeth Stakes	L Piggott	8-7	4/9f	6	1st	2 lengths
12 Sep 70	Doncaster	1 3/4 miles	St Leger Stakes	L Piggott	9-0	2/7f	9	1st	1 length
04 Oct 70	Longchamp	1 1/2 miles	Prix de l'Arc de Triomphe	L Piggott	8-10	2/5f	14	2nd	Head
17 Oct 70	Newmarket	1 1/4 miles	Champion Stakes	L Piggott	8-7	4/11f	8	2nd	1 1/2 lengths

== Stud record ==
Having been sent to stand at stud in the United States, Nijinsky was registered there as Nijinsky II.

The horse was an excellent sire. He sired 155 Stakes/Group winners (18.1% of 862 total foals) and 519 individual winners (60.2%), ranging over the full range of distances at which he excelled as a racehorse. He is the only sire to have a winner of the Kentucky and Epsom Derbies in the same year (1986). The horse was champion sire in Great Britain and Ireland in 1986 and champion broodmare sire in the United States in 1993 and 1994.

His notable progeny included:

- Caucasus – winner of 1975 Irish St Leger and later three Grade 1 races in America
- Caerleon – Three-Year-Old Champion Colt in France, won the Group One Prix du Jockey Club and International Stakes, Leading sire in Great Britain & Ireland (1988, 1991); sire of Generous
- Dancing Spree – won 1989 Breeders' Cup Sprint, Suburban Handicap, Carter Handicap, True North Handicap, Churchill Downs Handicap, Gulfstream Park Sprint Championship
- De La Rose – Champion US filly (Eclipse Award), 1981
- Ferdinand – 1986 Kentucky Derby & 1987 Breeders' Cup Classic, United States Horse of the Year
- Golden Fleece – won 1982 Epsom Derby, undefeated Champion Three-Year-Old Colt in England & Ireland
- Green Dancer – won 1974 Futurity Stakes, 1975 Prix Lupin, Poule d'Essai des Poulains, Leading sire in France in 1991
- Ile de Bourbon – won 1978 King George VI and Queen Elizabeth Stakes
- Kings Lake – won 1981 Irish 2000 Guineas, Sussex Stakes and Joe McGrath Memorial Stakes
- Lammtarra – undefeated, won 1995 Epsom Derby, King George VI and Queen Elizabeth Stakes and Prix de l'Arc de Triomphe
- Maplejinsky – winner of Monmouth Oaks and Alabama Stakes, dam of American Triple Tiara of Thoroughbred Racing (US fillies' Triple Crown) winner Sky Beauty
- Maruzensky – undefeated, Japan Racing Association Hall of Fame
- Niniski – won 1979 Irish St Leger, Prix Royal Oak
- Princesse Lida, Champion French 2 year old filly
- Quiet Fling – won 1976 Coronation Cup
- Royal Academy – won July Cup and Breeders' Cup Mile, sired Bullish Luck, Val Royal, and Bel Esprit, sire of Black Caviar
- Seattle Dancer – in 1985 the world's most expensive yearling, selling for US$13.1 million
- Shadeed – won 1985 2,000 Guineas, sired Alydeed
- Shahrastani – won 1986 Epsom Derby, Irish Derby
- Sky Classic – Canadian Horse Racing Hall of Fame, US Eclipse Award winner
- Solford – winner of the 1983 Eclipse Stakes
- Whiskey Road – sire of Strawberry Road

Nijinsky was a favourite of Queen Elizabeth II and she visited him as often as possible at Claiborne Stud.

Nijinsky was euthanised in April 1992 as a result of "the infirmities of old age" after suffering from laminitis since 1985. He is buried at Claiborne Farm.

== Pedigree ==
Pedigree of Nijinsky (CAN), bay stallion, 1967
Sire Northern Dancer (CAN) 1961	Nearctic (CAN); 1954	Nearco	Pharos
Sire Northern Dancer (CAN) 1961	Nearctic (CAN); 1954	Nearco	Nogara
Sire Northern Dancer (CAN) 1961	Nearctic (CAN); 1954	Lady Angela	Hyperion
Sire Northern Dancer (CAN) 1961	Nearctic (CAN); 1954	Lady Angela	Sister Sarah
Sire Northern Dancer (CAN) 1961	Natalma (USA); 1957	Native Dancer	Polynesian
Sire Northern Dancer (CAN) 1961	Natalma (USA); 1957	Native Dancer	Geisha
Sire Northern Dancer (CAN) 1961	Natalma (USA); 1957	Almahmoud	Mahmoud
Sire Northern Dancer (CAN) 1961	Natalma (USA); 1957	Almahmoud	Arbitrator
Dam Flaming Page (CAN) 1959	Bull Page (USA); 1947	Bull Lea	Bull Dog
Dam Flaming Page (CAN) 1959	Bull Page (USA); 1947	Bull Lea	Rose Leaves
Dam Flaming Page (CAN) 1959	Bull Page (USA); 1947	Our Page	Blue Larkspur
Dam Flaming Page (CAN) 1959	Bull Page (USA); 1947	Our Page	Occult
Dam Flaming Page (CAN) 1959	Flaring Top (USA); 1947	Menow	Pharamond II
Dam Flaming Page (CAN) 1959	Flaring Top (USA); 1947	Menow	Alcibiades
Dam Flaming Page (CAN) 1959	Flaring Top (USA); 1947	Flaming Top	Omaha
Dam Flaming Page (CAN) 1959	Flaring Top (USA); 1947	Flaming Top	Firetop (Family:8f)

== See also ==
- List of racehorses
