= Dosage Index =

Index based on a racehorse's pedigree

The Dosage Index is a mathematical figure used by breeders of Thoroughbred race horses, and sometimes by bettors handicapping horse races, to quantify a horse's ability, or inability, to negotiate the various distances at which horse races are run. It is calculated based on an analysis of the horse's pedigree.

== History ==
Interest in determining which sires of race horses transmit raw speed, and which sires transmit stamina (defined as the ability to successfully compete at longer distances) to their progeny dates back to the early 20th century, when a French researcher, Lt. Col. J. J. Vuillier, published a study on the subject (called Dosage), which was subsequently modified by an Italian breeding expert, Dr. Franco Varola, in two books he authored, entitled Typology Of The Race Horse and The Functional Development Of The Thoroughbred.

However, these observations attracted little interest from the general public until 1981, when Daily Racing Form breeding columnist Leon Rasmussen published a new version of Dosage developed by an American scientist and horse owner, Steven A. Roman, Ph.D., in his analysis of the upcoming Kentucky Derby for that year. The new approach, which was more accessible to owners, breeders and handicappers and was supported by solid statistical data, rapidly caught on, and the term "Dosage Index" has been a fixture in the lexicon of horse racing ever since. The details of Dosage methodology have been summarized in Dr. Roman's book entitled Dosage: Pedigree & Performance published in 2002.

== Method ==
The index itself is compiled by noting the presence of certain influential sires, known as chefs-de-race (French for "chiefs of racing", or, more esoterically, "masters of the breed") in the first four generations of a horse's pedigree. Based on what distances the progeny of the sires so designated excelled in during their racing careers (the distance preferences displayed by the sires themselves while racing being irrelevant), each chef-de-race (the list released in the early 1980s identified 120 such sires, as of October 2019 there are 232 horses on the list) is placed in one or two of the following categories, or "aptitudinal groups": Brilliant, Intermediate, Classic, Solid or Professional, with "Brilliant" indicating that the sire's progeny fared best at very short distances and "Professional" denoting a propensity for very long races on the part of the sire's offspring, the other three categories ranking along the same continuum in the aforementioned order. If a chef-de-race is placed in two different aptitudinal groups, in no case can the two groups be more than two positions apart; for example, Classic-Solid or Brilliant-Classic are permissible, but Brilliant-Solid, Intermediate-Professional and Brilliant-Professional are not.

If a horse's sire is on the chef-de-race list, it counts 16 points for the group to which the sire belongs (or eight in each of two categories if the sire was placed in two groups); a grandsire counts eight points, a great-grandsire four, and a great-great-grandsire two (female progenitors do not count directly, but if any of their sires etc. are on the chef-de-race list points would accrue via such sires).

This results in a Dosage Profile consisting of five separate figures, listed in order of Brilliant-Intermediate-Classic-Solid-Professional. Secretariat, the 1973 Triple Crown winner, for example, had a Dosage Profile of 20-14-7-9-0. To arrive at the Dosage Index, the first two figures plus one-half the value of the third figure are added together, and then divided by one-half of the third figure plus the sum of the last two figures. In this case, it would be 37.5 (20 + 14+ 3.5) divided by 12.5 (3.5 + 9 + 0), giving Secretariat a Dosage Index of exactly 3.00 (the figure almost always being expressed with two places to the right of the decimal point and rounded to the nearest 0.01).

A second mathematical value, called the Center of Distribution, can also be computed from the Dosage Profile. To determine this value, the number of Brilliant points in the profile is doubled, and added to the number of Intermediate points; from this is then subtracted the number of Solid points and twice the number of Professional points. The result is then divided by the total number of points in the entire profile, including the Classic points. In Secretariat's case, this would work out as 54 (40 + 14) minus 9 (9 + 0) divided by 50 (20 + 14 + 7 + 9 + 0), yielding a Center of Distribution of 0.90 (the figure nearly always being rounded to the nearest 100th of a point, as with the Dosage Index).

High Dosage Index (and Center of Distribution) figures are associated with a tendency to perform best over shorter distances, while low numbers signify an inherent preference for longer races. The median Dosage Index of contemporary North American thoroughbreds is estimated at 2.40 (the average figure being impossible to calculate because some horses have a Dosage Index of "infinity," a scenario which arises when a horse has only Brilliant and/or Intermediate chef-de-race influences in its Dosage Profile). The average Center of Distribution for modern-day North American race horses is believed to be approximately 0.70 (both Dosage Index and Center of Distribution figures tend to be lower for European thoroughbreds because in Europe the races are longer on aggregate and European breeders thus place greater emphasis on breeding their horses for stamina rather than speed).

== Analysis ==
Retroactive research conducted at the time the term "Dosage Index" first became common knowledge revealed that at that time no horse having a Dosage Index of higher than 4.00 had won the Kentucky Derby since at least 1929 (a year chosen because by then the number of available of chefs-de-race on which to base the figures was thought to have reached a critical mass), and that over the same period only one Belmont Stakes winner (Damascus in 1967) had such a Dosage figure. It was also determined at that time that few horses with no chef-de-race influences in the two most stamina-laden groups, Solid and Professional, had won major races at distances of 1 1/4 miles or longer even if the horse had a sufficient Classic presence in its pedigree to keep the Dosage Index from being over 4.00 (when Affirmed won the Triple Crown in 1978, for instance, he became the first horse with no Solid or Professional points in his Dosage Profile to win either the Kentucky Derby or the Belmont Stakes since the 1930s). In recent years, however, several horses with no Solid or Professional chefs-de-race in the first four generations of their pedigrees—and indeed, a few with Dosage Indexes of above 4.00—have managed to win the Kentucky Derby and Belmont Stakes, highlighting the issue of increasing speed and decreasing stamina in contemporary American thoroughbred pedigrees. For example, 1998 Kentucky Derby winner Real Quiet had a Dosage Index of 6.02, while 2005 Kentucky Derby winner Giacomo has a Dosage Index of 4.33 and no Solid or Professional points in his Dosage Profile. Triple Crown winner American Pharoah has a Dosage Index of 4.33.

As a result of these anomalies, the theory's usefulness has been questioned by some, at least with regard to the Kentucky Derby. The system's defenders, however, point out that in recent times a large proportion of U.S.-bred horses with low Dosage figures have been sent to race in foreign countries where the distances of races are longer, resulting in most horses competing in the Kentucky Derby and similar American races having relatively high Dosage numbers and/or lacking Solid or Professional chef-de-race representation. Yet the statistical foundation of Dosage remains compelling and the theory accurately differentiates Thoroughbred pedigree type for large populations of horses competitively performing over a range of distances, track surfaces and ages. With regard to the Kentucky Derby, however, only results from 1981 onward reflect a method without retrofitting or using information unavailable at the time. Many of the chefs-de-race who "predicted" the 1929-1981 Derby winners were made that way because of the Derby winners themselves, making the logic circular.
