= Dauphin Fabuleux =

Canadian-bred Thoroughbred racehorse

- Sire: Le Fabuleux
- Grandsire: Wild Risk
- Dam: Jansum Regal
- Damsire: Viceregal
- Sex: Stallion
- Foaled: 1982
- Country: Canada
- Colour: Chestnut
- Breeder: Donald G. McLelland
- Owner: Sam-Son Farm
- Trainer: James E. Day
- Record: 11: 6-1-0
- Earnings: $400,301

Major wins
- Cup and Saucer Stakes (1984); Coronation Futurity Stakes (1984); Grey Stakes (1984); Summer Stakes (1984)

Awards
- Canadian Champion 2-Year-Old Colt (1984); Canadian Horse of the Year (1984)

Dauphin Fabuleux is a Canadian Champion Thoroughbred racehorse. Bred by Canadian Horse Racing Hall of Fame member, Don McClelland, he was purchased for $77,000 at the 1983 CTHS yearling auction by Sam-Son Farm.

Dauphin Fabuleux was out of the mare Jansum Regal, a daughter of 1968 Canadian Horse of the Year, Viceregal. His French sire, Le Fabuleux, was a winner of several major races including the French Derby and was the Leading broodmare sire in France in 1980.

Conditioned for racing by trainer Jim Day, Dauphin Fabuleux was ridden by Jeffrey Fell. Racing at age two in 1984, he won four of the most important races for two-year-olds in Canada, two on turf, and two on dirt. He was sent to Hollywood Park Racetrack in California to compete in the November 10th inaugural running of the Breeders' Cup Juvenile in which he finished sixth to winner Chief's Crown. At year end, Dauphin Fabuleux earned Canadian Horse of the Year honors, the first of a record nine for Sam-Son Farm.

At age three, Dauphin Fabuleux met with limited racing success before being retired to stud where he met with modest success, notably siring French King, a Canadian multiple stakes winner including the Coronation Futurity Stakes.
