= Katsuragi Ace =

Japanese-bred Thoroughbred racehorse

Katsuragi Ace カツラギエース
- Katsuragi Ace with his jockey, Katsuichi Nishiura, during the 1984 Japan Cup.
- Breed: Thoroughbred
- Sire: Boysie Boy (IRE)
- Grandsire: King's Troop (GB)
- Dam: Tanino Venture (JPN)
- Damsire: Venture (GB)
- Sex: Stallion
- Foaled: April 24, 1980
- Died: July 3, 2000 (aged 20)
- Country: Japan
- Colour: Dark Bay
- Breeder: Sentaro Katayama
- Owner: Ichizo Node
- Racing colours
- Trainer: Kazumi Domon
- Jockey: Hiroki Sakiyama; Katsuichi Nishiura
- Record: 22: 10-4-1
- Earnings: ¥401,683,400

Major wins
- Kyoto Shimbun Hai (1983); Sankei Osaka Hai (1984); Keihan Hai (1984); Takarazuka Kinen (1984); Mainichi Okan (1984); Japan Cup (1984)

Awards
- JRA Award for Best Older Male Horse (1984)

Katsuragi Ace (Japanese: カツラギエース, Hepburn: Katsuragi Eesu; 24 April 1980 – 3 July 2000) was a Japanese Thoroughbred racehorse and sire best known for winning the 1984 Japan Cup, becoming the first Japanese-trained horse to win the race. He won twice as a two-year-old and three times in the following year, but was well beaten by his contemporary Mr. C. B. in all three legs of the Japanese Triple Crown. In the first half of 1984 he won the Grade II Sankei Osaka Hai, the Grade III Keihan Hai, and the Grade I Takarazuka Kinen. In the autumn of 1984 he defeated Mr. C. B. in the Grade II Mainichi Okan and overcame a top-class international field to win the Japan Cup. He was retired to stud in 1985 but had little success as a breeding stallion. He died in 2000 at the age of twenty.

== Background ==
Katsuragi Ace was a dark bay or brown horse with a white star and snip bred in Japan by Sentaro Katayama. His sire was Boysie Boy, an Irish-bred Colt who raced in Europe and produced his best performance when finishing second to Habitat in the 1969 Prix du Moulin. He later stood as a breeding stallion in Australia and Japan. Katsuragi Ace's dam Tanino Venture was a Japanese-bred daughter of the British stallion Venture, whose wins included the Middle Park Stakes, St James's Palace Stakes and Sussex Stakes. Tanino Venture was descended from the influential British broodmare Polly Flinders. During his racing career Katsuragi Ace was trained by Kazumi Domon. He was ridden in all of his early race by Hiroki Sakiyama.

== Racing career ==
=== 1982: two-year-old season ===
Katsuragi Ace made a successful racecourse debut by winning a maiden race over 1200 metres at Hanshin Racecourse on 19 September. After finishing second to Mejiro Mont Cenis over 1400 metres at the same track on 3 October he won the Rindo Tokubetsu over 1200 metres at Kyoto Racecourse two weeks later. On his final appearance of the year he finished third to Mejiro Mont Cenis over 1600 metres on 27 November.

=== 1983: three-year-old season ===
Katsuragi Ace began his second season by finishing unplaced over 1600 metres at Kyoto in February and then won the Shunran Sho at Hanshin in March. At Nakayama Racecourse in April he contested the Satsuki Sho (the first leg of the Japanese Triple Crown) and finished unplaced behind Mr. C. B. On 8 May he recorded his most important success up to that point when he won the NHK Hai (the forerunner of the NHK Mile Cup) over 2000 metres at Tokyo Racecourse. Three weeks later he finished sixth behind Mr. C. B. in the Tokyo Yushun. He ended the first half of his season by finishing sixth to Nihon Pillow Winner over 1400 metres at Chukyo Racecourse on 26 June.

After a summer break, Katsuragi Ace returned on 2 October and finished second to Suzuka Koban in the Kobe Shimbun Hai at Hanshin. Katsuichi Nishiura took over from Sakiyama when the colt appeared in the Kyoto Shimbun Hai three weeks later and won from Lead Hoyu and Dokan Yashima. Nishiura rode Katsuragi Ace in all of his subsequent races. The colt ended his season by finishing unplaced behind Mr. C. B. in the Kikuka Sho at Kyoto on 13 November.

=== 1984: four-year-old season ===
In 1984 the system of Graded stakes races was introduced in Japan. On his first run as a four-year-old Katsuragi Ace finished fourth in the Naruo Kinen at Hanshin on 11 March and then won the Grade II Sankei Osaka Hai on 1 April, beating the Queen Elizabeth II Commemorative Cup winner Long Grace. On 13 May at Kyoto he defeated Sunny Ciboulette (Hanshin Futurity Stakes) and the mare Global Dyna to win the Grade III Keihan Hai. On his next appearance the colt was moved up to Grade I class for the Takarazuka Kinen over 2200 metres at Hanshin on 3 June. He won by one and a quarter lengths from Suzuka Koban, with Global Dyna taking third place. Three weeks later he ended his spring and summer campaign by finishing fifth in the Takamatsunomiya Cup at Chukyo Racecourse.

On 7 October Katsuragi Ace returned in the Grade II Mainichi Okan over 1800 metres at Tokyo and defeated Mr. C. B. by a head. In the autumn edition of the Grade I Tenno Sho three weeks later he finished fifth of the fifteen runners behind Mr. C. B. On 25 November, in front of a crowd of 112,000 at Tokyo, Katsuragi Ace was one of fourteen horses to contest the fourth running of the Japan Cup and started a 40/1 outsider. The three previous editions of the race had been won by two horses from North America (Mairzy Doates and Half Iced) and one from Europe (Stanerra). The Japanese runners were headed by Mr. C. B. and Symboli Rudolf meaning that the race featured the first showdown between two Triple Crown winners in Japanese racing history. The overseas challengers included Strawberry Road, Kiwi and Bounty Hawk (VRC Derby) from Australasia, Majesty's Prince from America and the British-trained gelding Bedtime. Wearing a distinctive white hood, Katsuragi Ace went to the front soon after the start and opened up a big lead, but appeared to weaken approaching the final turn and faced several challengers early in the straight. He rallied strongly in the closing stages, however, and won by one and a half lengths from Bedtime, with Symboli Rudolf in third, Majesty's Prince fourth and Mr. C. B. unplaced.

On his final racecourse appearance, Katsuragi Ace was invited to contest the Arima Kinen at Nakayama on 23 December. He finished second to Symboli Rudolf, with Mr. C. B. in third.

== Stud record ==
Katsuragi Ace was retired from racing to become a breeding stallion. His only Graded Stakes winner was the mare Yamanin Marine who won the Grade II Sankei Sports Sho Yonsai Himba Tokubetsu in 1991. The stallion died of heart failure on 3 July 2000.

== In popular culture ==
An anthropomorphized version of Katsuragi Ace appears as a character in the Japanese multimedia franchise Umamusume: Pretty Derby, voiced by Natsumi Fujiwara. She is depicted as a confident and ambitious young woman from the countryside whose desire to obtain the Triple Crown stems from a mission to break stereotypes against rural Umamusume. Due to this, she shares an admiration and rivalry with Mr. C. B. and Symboli Rudolf.

== Racing form ==
Katsuragi Ace won ten races and scored five more podiums out of 22 starts. In the debut year of graded stakes system in 1984, Katsuragi Ace snatched five graded race in one year. This year eventually became his final season. This data is available based on JBIS and netkeiba.

Date	Age	Track	Name	Grade	Distance	Finished	Time	Jockey	Winner (2nd Place)
19 September 1982	3	Hanshin	3 yo Debut (Note: The age counting for horses in Japan was based on the East Asian age reckoning until it was changed to international standards in 2001, with foals starting at the age of 1.)		1200m	1st	1:10.4	Hiroki Sakiyama	(Clear Lancer)
3 October 1982	3	Hanshin	Hagi Tokubetsu		1400m	2nd	1:23.1	Hiroki Sakiyama	Mejiro Mont Cenis
16 October 1982	3	Kyoto	Rindo Tokubetsu		1200m	1st	1:10.3	Hiroki Sakiyama	(Takenohien)
27 November 1982	3	Kyoto	Radio Tampa Hai Sansai Stakes		1600m	3rd	1:36.6	Hiroki Sakiyama	Mejiro Mont Cenis
20 February 1983	4	Kyoto	4 yo stakes		1600m	13th	1:39.8	Hiroki Sakiyama	Uzumasaryu
19 March 1983	4	Hanshin	Shunlan Prize		2000m	1st	2:04.5	Hiroki Sakiyama	(Persepolis)
17 April 1983	4	Nakayama	Satsuki Sho	八 (Note: Denotes a race belonging to the "Eight Great Races" (Hachidaikyousou), considered the most prestigious races in Japan, proceeding the introduction of the graded system in 1984.)	2000m	11th	2:10.4	Hiroki Sakiyama	Mr. C.B.
8 May 1983	4	Tokyo	NHK Hai		2000m	1st	2:02.9	Hiroki Sakiyama	(Bruderban)
29 May 1983	4	Tokyo	Tokyo Yushun	八	2400m	6th	2:30.7	Hiroki Sakiyama	Mr. C.B.
26 June 1983	4	Chukyo	Chukyo 4 yo Tokubetsu		1400m	2nd	1:23.0	Hiroki Sakiyama	Nihon Pillow Winner
2 October 1983	4	Hanshin	Kobe Shimbun Hai		2000m	2nd	2:01.1	Hiroki Sakiyama	Suzuka Koban
23 October 1983	4	Kyoto	Kyoto Shimbun Hai		2000m	1st	2:02.0	Katsuichi Nishiura	(Lead Hoyu)
13 November 1983	4	Kyoto	Kikuka Sho	八	3000m	20th	3:12.6	Katsuichi Nishiura	Mr. C.B.
11 March 1984	5	Hanshin	Naruo Kinen	GII	2500m	4th	2:35.1	Katsuichi Nishiura	Hashi Rodi
1 April 1984	5	Hanshin	Sankei Osaka Hai	GII	2000m	1st	2:00.6	Katsuichi Nishiura	(Long Grace)
13 May 1984	5	Kyoto	Keihan Hai	GIII	2000m	1st	2:02.1	Katsuichi Nishiura	(Sunny Cypruce)
3 June 1984	5	Hanshin	Takarazuka Kinen	GI	2200m	1st	2:12.4	Katsuichi Nishiura	(Suzuka Koban)
24 June 1984	5	Chukyo	Takamatsunomiya Hai	GII	2000m	5th	2:04.4	Katsuichi Nishiura	Kyoei Rare
7 October 1984	5	Tokyo	Mainichi Okan	GII	1800m	1st	1:47.5	Katsuichi Nishiura	(Mr. C.B.)
28 October 1984	5	Tokyo	Tenno Sho (Autumn)	GI	2000m	5th	1:59.5	Katsuichi Nishiura	Mr. C.B.
25 November 1984	5	Tokyo	Japan Cup	GI	2400m	1st	2:26.3	Katsuichi Nishiura	(Bedtime)
23 December 1984	5	Nakayama	Arima Kinen	GI	2500m	2nd	2:33.1	Katsuichi Nishiura	Symboli Rudolf

== Pedigree ==
Pedigree of Katsuragi Ace (JPN), brown stallion 1980
Sire Boysie Boy (IRE) 1965	King's Troop (GB); 1957	Princely Gift	Nasrullah
Sire Boysie Boy (IRE) 1965	King's Troop (GB); 1957	Princely Gift	Blue Gem
Sire Boysie Boy (IRE) 1965	King's Troop (GB); 1957	Equiria	Atout Maitre
Sire Boysie Boy (IRE) 1965	King's Troop (GB); 1957	Equiria	Epona
Sire Boysie Boy (IRE) 1965	Rising Hope (GB); 1951	The Phoenix	Chateau Bouscaut
Sire Boysie Boy (IRE) 1965	Rising Hope (GB); 1951	The Phoenix	Fille de Poete
Sire Boysie Boy (IRE) 1965	Rising Hope (GB); 1951	Admirable	Nearco
Sire Boysie Boy (IRE) 1965	Rising Hope (GB); 1951	Admirable	Silvia
Dam Tanino Venture (JPN) 1971	Venture (GB); 1957	Relic	War Relic
Dam Tanino Venture (JPN) 1971	Venture (GB); 1957	Relic	Bridal Colors
Dam Tanino Venture (JPN) 1971	Venture (GB); 1957	Rose o' Lynn	Pherozshah
Dam Tanino Venture (JPN) 1971	Venture (GB); 1957	Rose o' Lynn	Rocklyn
Dam Tanino Venture (JPN) 1971	Abbey Bridge (GB); 1958	Entente Cordiale	Djebel
Dam Tanino Venture (JPN) 1971	Abbey Bridge (GB); 1958	Entente Cordiale	Herringbone
Dam Tanino Venture (JPN) 1971	Abbey Bridge (GB); 1958	British Railways	Umidwar
Dam Tanino Venture (JPN) 1971	Abbey Bridge (GB); 1958	British Railways	Euston (Family 14-c)
