= Knickerbocker Stakes =

- Class: Listed
- Location: Belmont Park; Elmont, New York, United States
- Inaugurated: 1960
- Race type: Thoroughbred – Flat racing
- Website: www.nyra.com

Race information
- Distance: 1 1/8 miles (9 furlongs)
- Surface: Turf
- Track: left-handed
- Qualification: Three-year-olds and up
- Weight: allowance
- Purse: $200,000 (since 2013)

The Knickerbocker Stakes is a Listed American race on turf for Thoroughbred horses run each year at Belmont Park in Elmont, New York. The Knickerbocker is open to three-year-olds and up, and set at a distance of 1 1/8 miles (nine furlongs). Run in mid October, it currently offers a purse of $200,000.

== Graded status ==
- Grade 2: 1998–2004, 2017–present
- Grade 3: 1973–1997, 2005–2016

== Historical notes ==
The Knickerbocker is named for a fictional character, Diedrich Knickerbocker, from Washington Irving's Knickerbocker History of New York– a spoof on the imagined colony of New Netherland.

The race was originally run as the Knickerbocker Handicap at Aqueduct Racetrack in late October or early November, although the 1962, 1995 and 2001 renewals were held at Belmont. The race was permanently moved to Belmont Park in 2008 and was changed from a handicap to allowance weight conditions in 2009.

The race has been run at a variety of distances over the years:

- 1 5/8 miles – 1960, 1961, 1971 to 1974
- 1 3/8 miles – 1962, 1975, 1976, 1978 to 1986
- 1 3/16 miles – 1963 to 1969
- 1 5/16 miles – 1970
- 1 1/4 miles – 1977, 1995 and 2001
- 1 1/8 miles – 1987 to 1994, 1996 to 2000, 2002 to present

The Knickerbocker was run in two divisions in 1963, 1967, 1969, 1976, 1977, 1980, 1981, 1982, 1983, and 1985.

In 1977, 1992, 1997 and 2023 the race was switched from turf to dirt due to rain. The 2023 event only fielded a two horse field.

In 2025 the event was downgraded by the Thoroughbred Owners and Breeders Association to Listed status.

== Records ==
Speed record: (at current distance of 1 1/8 miles on turf)

- Za Approval, 1:46.51 ( 2013)

Most wins:

- 2 – Shady Character (1974, 1975)
- 2 – Charge d'Affaires (1999, 2000)
- 2 – Boisterous (2011, 2012)
- 2 – Blacktype (2017, 2018)

Most wins by a jockey:

- 7 – Jean Cruguet (1977 (2), 1978, 1985, 1986, 1988, 1992)

Most wins by a trainer:

- 6 – Christophe Clement (1993, 1999, 2000, 2009, 2013, 2017)

Most wins by an owner:

- 5 – Ogden Mills Phipps / Phipps Stable (1974, 1975, 1978, 2011, 2012)

== Winners ==
Year	Winner	Age	Jockey	Trainer	Owner	Distance	Time	Win$
2023	Pioneering Spirit	4	José Ortiz	Linda Rice	A. Bianco Holding Limited	11/8 M	1:51.42	$112,500
2022	King Cause	7	Kendrick Carmouche	Michael J. Maker	Nice Guys Stables	11/8 M	1:50.06	$150,000
2021	Sacred Life	6	José Ortiz	Chad C. Brown	Michael Dubb, Wonder Stables, Bethlehem Stables & Madaket Stables	11/8 M	1:46.66	$150,000
2020	Devamani	6	Joel Rosario	Chad C. Brown	Sanford J. Goldfarb	11/8 M	1:51.78	$110,000
2019	Lucullan	5	Luis Saez	Kiaran McLaughlin	Godolphin Racing LLC	11/8 M	1:46.87	$110,000
2018	Blacktype	7	Joel Rosario	Christophe Clement	Jump Sucker Stable	11/8 M	1:48.35	$110,000
2017	Blacktype	6	Joel Rosario	Christophe Clement	Jump Sucker Stable	11/8 M	1:50.33	$120,000
2016	Heart to Heart	5	Irad Ortiz Jr.	Brian A. Lynch	Terry Hamilton	11/8 M	1:50.62	$120,000
2015	Messi	5	John R. Velazquez	H. Graham Motion	Gestut Brummerhof	11/8 M	1:49.70	$120,000
2014	Legendary	5	Sheldon Russell	Niall Saville	Walter Swinburn	11/8 M	1:51.65	$120,000
2013	Za Approval	5	Joel Rosario	Christophe Clement	Live Oak Racing	11/8 M	1:46.51	$120,000
2012	Boisterous	5	Jose Lezcano	Claude R. McGaughey III	Phipps Stable	11/8 M	1:50.26	$60,000
2011	Boisterous	4	John R. Velazquez	Claude R. McGaughey III	Phipps Stable	11/8 M	1:51.42	$60,000
2010	Violon Sacre	5	Pablo Fragoso	Patrick L. Biancone	Bernard Weill	11/8 M	1:52.62	$60,000
2009	Operation Red Dawn	7	Rajiv Maragh	Christophe Clement	Dion A. Recachina	11/8 M	1:50.21	$63,900
2008	Formal Decree	5	Jean-Luc Samyn	Saeed bin Suroor	Godolphin Racing LLC	11/8 M	1:47.57	$66,840
2007	Fishy Advice	5	Javier Castellano	David G. Donk	Charles K. Marquis	11/8 M	1:52.06	$67,740
2006	Drum Major	4	Joe Bravo	George R. Weaver	Dogwood Stable	11/8 M	1:50.59	$68,460
2005	Atlando	4	Jerry Bailey	Pascal Bary	Gary A. Tanaka	11/8 M	1:50.93	$90,000
2004	Host	4	Christopher DeCarlo	Todd A. Pletcher	Eugene Melnyk & Laura Melnyk	11/8 M	1:49.80	$90,000
2003	Better Talk Now	4	Edgar Prado	H. Graham Motion	Bushwood Stables	11/8 M	1:50.40	$90,000
2002	Dawn of the Condor	5	Jorge Chavez	Gary J. Sciacca	Rich Meadow Farm	11/8 M	1:52.40	$90,000
2001	Sumitas	5	Edgar Prado	Robert J. Frankel	Gary A. Tanaka	11/4 M	2:02.40	$90,000
2000	Charge d'Affaires	5	José A. Santos	Christophe Clement	Marquise de Moratalla	11/8 M	1:49.00	$90,000
1999	Charge d'Affaires	4	José A. Santos	Christophe Clement	Marquise de Moratalla	11/8 M	1:49.00	$66,480
1998	Sahm	4	John R. Velazquez	Kiaran P. McLaughlin	Shadwell Stable	11/8 M	1:48.60	$67,440
1997	Sir Cat	4	Mike E. Smith	William I. Mott	John R. Murrell	11/8 M	1:50.00	$69,060
1996	Mr. Bluebird	5	Mike E. Smith	John C. Kimmel	Thomas Warfield	11/8 M	1:49.20	$69,660
1995	Diplomatic Jet	3	Mike E. Smith	James E. Picou	Fred W. Hooper	11/4 M	2:04.80	$87,870
1994	Kiri's Clown	5	Mike Luzzi	Philip G. Johnson	Cobble View Stable	11/8 M	1:49.20	$52,335
1993	River Majesty	4	Mike E. Smith	Christophe Clement	Bruce McNall	11/8 M	1:54.40	$52,920
1992	Binary Light	3	Jean Cruguet	Patrick J. Kelly	Live Oak Racing	11/8 M	1:52.60	$56,160
1991	Home of the Free	3	John R. Velazquez	MacKenzie Miller	Rokeby Stable	11/8 M	1:48.60	$56,070
1990	Who's To Pay	4	Jerry Bailey	MacKenzie Miller	Rokeby Stable	11/8 M	1:49.20	$57,240
1989	Trans Banner	4	Jean-Luc Samyn	John P. Campo	Casetta Farm	11/8 M	1:53.60	$58,770
1988	Jimmy's Bronco	4	Jean Cruguet	Michael A. Bray	Michael Hanafin	11/8 M	1:54.80	$58,590
1987	Laser Lane	4	José A. Santos	H. Allen Jerkens	Centennial Farms	11/8 M	1:51.60	$73,260
1986	Duluth	4	Jean Cruguet	Thomas J. Kelly	Roslyn Farms	13/8 M	2:20.80	$55,710
1985-1	Putting Green	5	Eddie Maple	Chester Ross	Seymour Cohn	13/8 M	2:23.80	$54,405
1985-2	Rocamadour II	6	Jean Cruguet	Frank LaBoccetta Sr.	Twin Bee Stable	13/8 M	2:24.00	$54,405
1984	He's Vivacious	4	Robbie Davis	Kay E. Jensen	Archie R. Donaldson	13/8 M	2:26.00	$46,440
1983-1	Four Bases	4	Robert Thibeau Jr.	Gilberto Puentes	Murray M. Garren	13/8 M	2:17.80	$34,470
1983-2	Piling	5	Eddie Maple	Peter M. Howe	Pillar Farms	13/8 M	2:19.00	$34,230
1982-1	Half Iced	3	Don MacBeth	Stanley M. Hough	Bertram Firestone	13/8 M	2:18.20	$33,330
1982-2	If Winter Comes	4	Mike Venezia	Mary M. Cotter	Edward Clucas Jr.	13/8 M	2:19.60	$33,330
1981-1	Euphrosyne	5	Richard Migliore	Stephen A. DiMauro	William de Burgh	13/8 M	2:18.40	$33,540
1981-2	Ghazwan	4	Constantino Hernandez	Leonard Imperio	Buckram Oak Farm	13/8 M	2:20.60	$33,300
1980-1	Foretake	4	John Ruane	Mary L. Edens	Adele W. Paxson	13/8 M	2:22.20	$33,450
1980-2	Lobsang II	4	Mike Venezia	Victor J. Nickerson	Walter Haefner	13/8 M	2:23.60	$33,450
1979	French Colonial	4	Jacinto Vásquez	David A. Whiteley	Lazy F Ranch	13/8 M	2:21.40	$35,880
1978	Fluorescent Light	4	Jean Cruguet	Angel Penna Sr.	Ogden Mills Phipps	13/8 M	2:14.20	$34,560
1977-1	Dance d'Espoir	5	Jean Cruguet	Floreano Fernandez	Julie Miron	11/4 M	2:05.00	$26,460
1977-2	Keep the Promise	5	Jean Cruguet	Floreano Fernandez	Jule Fink	11/4 M	2:04.40	$26,010
1976-1	Javamine	3	Jorge Velásquez	Mackenzie Miller	Cragwood Stables	13/8 M	2:20.60	$26,100
1976-2	Oilfield	3	Sandy Hawley	Leonard Imperio	Nelson Bunker Hunt	13/8 M	2:22.60	$26,400
1975	Shady Character	4	Ángel Cordero Jr.	John W. Russell	Ogden Mills Phipps	13/8 M	2:16.20	$33,900
1974	Shady Character	3	Ángel Cordero Jr.	John W. Russell	Ogden Mills Phipps	15/8 M	2:41.40	$33,690
1973	Astray	4	Chuck Baltazar	Frank Y. Whiteley Jr.	William Haggin Perry	15/8 M	2:39.80	$34,710
1972	Triangular	5	John L. Rotz	Nick Combest	Edith Baily Dent	15/8 M	2:57.20	$16,665
1971	Fresh Alibhai	3	John Ruane	Joseph S. Nash	Joseph S. Nash	15/8 M	2:57.40	$20,970
1970	Mongo's Pride	3	Carlos H. Marquez	Don Combs	Mrs. Russell L. Reineman	15/16 M	2:44.00	$19,110
1969-1	Vent du Nord	4	Rudy L. Turcotte	Alfred A. Scotti	Emanuel Mittman	13/16 M	1:57.60	$15,031
1969-2	Zarco	3	Ron Turcotte	Victor J. Nickerson	Watermill Farm	13/16 M	1:56.40	$15,031
1968	Flit To	5	Manuel Ycaza	James P. Conway	Robert Lehman	13/16 M	1:56.00	$19,337
1967-1	Flag	7	Sandino Hernandez	H. Allen Jerkens	Roy C. Kidder	13/16 M	1:58.00	$14,771
1967-2	Dunderhead	4	Ernest Cardone	H. Allen Jerkens	Anne Jerkens	13/16 M	1:58.20	$14,934
1966	Rego	3	Hedley Woodhouse	James P. Conway	Niblick Stable	13/16 M	1:59.60	$19,597
1965	Circus	4	Mike Sorrentino	Sherrill W. Ward	Lazy F Ranch	13/16 M	1:55.80	$18,655
1964	Third Martini	5	Manuel Ycaza	H. Allen Jerkens	Hobeau Farm	13/16 M	1:56.20	$19,305
1963-1	Parka	5	Bill Shoemaker	Warren A. Croll Jr.	Pelican Stable	13/16 M	1:55.20	$14,105
1963-2	Hellenic Hero	5	Hedley Woodhouse	Frank L. Moore	Melanie Farm	13/16 M	1:54.00	$14,105
1962	The Axe II	4	Bill Shoemaker	John M. Gaver Sr.	Greentree Stable	13/8 M	2:13.20	$19,532
1961	T.V. Lark	4	Johnny Longden	Paul K. Parker	Preston W. Madden	15/8 M	2:40.00	$19,077
1960	Quiz Star	4	Bill Shoemaker	Burley E. Parke	Harbor View Farm	15/8 M	2:49.40	$18,712
