= Sugar Swirl Stakes =

- Class: Listed
- Location: Gulfstream Park; Hallandale Beach, Florida, United States
- Inaugurated: 1981 (as First Lady Handicap)
- Race type: Thoroughbred – Flat racing – Dirt
- Website: Gulfstream Park

Race information
- Distance: 6 furlongs
- Surface: Dirt
- Track: Left-handed
- Qualification: Fillies and Mares, three years old and older
- Weight: Base weights with allowances: 4-year-olds and older: 125 lbs. 3-year-olds: 123 lbs.
- Purse: US$140,000 (since 2024)

The Sugar Swirl Stakes is a Listed American Thoroughbred horse race for fillies and mares that are three years old or older, over a distance of 6 furlongs on the dirt track held annually in December at Gulfstream Park, Hallandale Beach, Florida. The event currently carries a purse of $140,000.

== History ==
The event is named in honor of the Canadian bred mare Sugar Swirl who was owned by Stronach Stables. The Stronach Group are the owners of Gulfstream Park where this event is held.

The race was inaugurated in 1981 and the event was run as the First Lady Handicap. At that time the event was held in January and the conditions of the race were for fillies and mares that were four years old or older.

In 2008 Sugar Swirl won this event and in 2010 the event was renamed to the Sugar Swirl Stakes. The event was moved to December in 2011 and there were two runnings of the event that year.

In 2024 the event was downgraded by the Thoroughbred Owners and Breeders Association to Listed status.

== Records ==
Speed record:

- 6 furlongs: 1:08.66 – Dust and Diamonds (2012)

Margins:

- 6 3/4 lengths – Lady's Island (2019)

Most wins:

- 2 - Harmony Lodge (2003, 2004)
- 2 - Lady's Island (2019, 2020)

Most wins by a jockey

- 6 – Javier Castellano (2006, 2008, 2011, 2013, 2014, 2018)
- 6 – John R. Velazquez (2002, 2003, 2005, 2009, 2011, 2015)

Most wins by a trainer

- 4 – Todd A. Pletcher (2003, 2004, 2009, 2012)

Most wins by an owner

- 2 – Edward P. Evans (1992, 2002)
- 2 – Eugene & Laura Melnyk (2003, 2004)
- 2 – Matties Racing Stable & Averill Racing (2019, 2020)

== Winners ==
Year	Winner	Age	Jockey	Trainer	Owner	Distance	Time	Purse	Grade	Ref
Sugar Swirl Stakes
2024	Mystic Lake	4	Irad Ortiz Jr.	Saffie Joseph Jr.	C2 Racing Stable & Stefania Farms	6 furlongs	1:11.20	$133,000	Listed	
2023	Spirit Wind	4	Jose L. Ortiz	Carlos David	Jacks or Better Farm	6 furlongs	1:10.58	$150,000	III	
2022	Frank's Rockette	5	Luis Saez	William I. Mott	Frank Fletcher Racing Operations	6 furlongs	1:09.63	$125,000	III	
2021	Center Aisle	4	Luis Saez	Paulo Lobo	OXO Equine	6 furlongs	1:09.54	$100,000	III	
2020	Lady's Island	6	Emisael Jaramillo	Georgina Baxter	Matties Racing Stable & Averill Racing	6 furlongs	1:10.46	$100,000	III	
2019	Lady's Island	5	Emisael Jaramillo	Georgina Baxter	Matties Racing Stable & Averill Racing	6 furlongs	1:10.75	$100,000	III	
2018	Dream Pauline	3	Javier Castellano	Kiaran P. McLaughlin	Stonestreet Stables	6 furlongs	1:11.10	$100,000	III	
2017	Rich Mommy	3	Luis Saez	Victor Barboza Jr.	Winds of Change Racing Stable	6 furlongs	1:10.44	$100,000	III	
2016	Dearest	3	Edgard J. Zayas	Gilberto Zerpa	Gelfenstein Farm	6 furlongs	1:09.59	$100,000	III	
2015	Best Behavior	5	John R. Velazquez	Martin D. Wolfson	Miller Racing	6 furlongs	1:09.69	$100,000	III	
2014	Merry Meadow	4	Javier Castellano	Mark A. Hennig	David S. Howe & William Parsons	6 furlongs	1:10.29	$100,000	III	
2013	Heart Stealer	3	Javier Castellano	Martin D. Wolfson	Peachtree Stable	6 furlongs	1:09.49	$100,000	III	
2012	Dust and Diamonds	4	John R. Velazquez	Todd A. Pletcher	Gorges Torrealba Hldgs. & Three Chimneys Farms	6 furlongs	1:08.66	$100,000	III	
2011†	Pomeroys Pistol	3	Javier Castellano	Amy Tarrant	Hardacre Farm	6 furlongs	1:09.35	$100,000	III	December
2011	Tar Heel Mom	6	Alan Garcia	Stanley M. Hough	Alex Rankin	6 furlongs	1:09.75	$100,000	III	January
2010	Pretty Prolific	4	Edgar S. Prado	James E. Baker	Tom R. Walters	6 furlongs	1:10.75	$100,000	III	
First Lady Stakes
2009	Game Face	4	John R. Velazquez	Todd A. Pletcher	Zabeel Racing International	6 furlongs	1:10.57	$100,000	III	
First Lady Handicap
2008	Sugar Swirl	5	Javier Castellano	Brian A. Lynch	Stronach Stables	6 furlongs	1:10.06	$100,000	III	
2007	Any Limit	4	Rafael Bejarano	H. Allen Jerkens	Joseph V. Shields, Jr	6 furlongs	1:10.58	$100,000	III	
2006	Smokey Glacken	5	Javier Castellano	James A. Jerkens	Susan & John Moore	6 furlongs	1:09.98	$100,000	III	
2005	Savorthetime	6	John R. Velazquez	Steven M. Asmussen	Brenda & Philip Robertson	6 furlongs	1:09.21	$100,000	III	
2004	Harmony Lodge	6	Richard Migliore	Todd A. Pletcher	Eugene & Laura Melnyk	6 furlongs	1:09.64	$100,000	III	
2003	Harmony Lodge	5	John R. Velazquez	Todd A. Pletcher	Eugene & Laura Melnyk	6 furlongs	1:10.31	$100,000	III	
2002	Raging Fever	4	John R. Velazquez	Mark A. Hennig	Edward P. Evans	6 furlongs	1:10.36	$100,000	III	
2001	Another	4	Edgar S. Prado	Thomas Victor Smith	Robert E. Masterson	6 furlongs	1:10.41	$117,000	III	
2000	Hurricane Bertie	5	Pat Day	Bernard S. Flint	Richard, Bertram & Elaine Klein	6 furlongs	1:10.22	$75,000	III	
1999	Scotzanna	7	Richard Migliore	Michael Wright Jr.	Bruno Schickedanz	6 furlongs	1:10.17	$75,000	III	
1998	U Can Do It	4	Shane Sellers	Larry Pilotti	Carina & Frank Marano	6 furlongs	1:09.86	$75,000	III	
1997	Chip	4	Joe Bravo	Sonny Hine	Carolyn H. Hine	6 furlongs	1:09.76	$75,000	III	
1996	Chaposa Springs	4	Jerry D. Bailey	Martin D. Wolfson	Suresh Chintamanen	6 furlongs	1:10.23	$75,000	III	
1995	Recognizable	4	Mike E. Smith	Claude R. McGaughey III	Ogden Mills Phipps	6 furlongs	1:09.74	$50,000	III	
1994	Santa Catalina	6	Jerry D. Bailey	Mark A. Hennig	Team Valor	6 furlongs	1:11.26	$50,000	III	
1993	Si Si Sezyou	3	Ruben Hernandez	Robert A. Hale	Anne Yates	6 furlongs	1:10.06	$50,000	III	
1992	Withallprobability	4	Craig Perret	D. Wayne Lukas	Edward P. Evans	6 furlongs	1:11.14	$50,000	Listed	
1991	Spirit of Fighter	8	José A. Vélez Jr.	Daniel C. Hurtak	Daniel C. Hurtak & Dennis G. Punches	6 furlongs	1:11.70	$50,000	Listed	
First Lady Breeders' Cup Handicap
1990	Sez Fourty	4	Miguel A. Gonzalez	Luis Olivares	Marissa Olivares & Three G Stable	6 furlongs	1:11.20	$45,940	Listed	
First Lady Handicap
1989	Waggley	6	Jean-Luc Samyn	Sonny Hine	Scott C. Savin	6 furlongs	1:11.00	$45,480	Listed	
1988	Funistrada	5	Walter Guerra	J. Bert Sonnier	Jamie S. Carrion	6 furlongs	1:10.20	$48,720	Listed	
1987	One Fine Lady	5	Roger Danjean	Pedro J. Sobarzo	Larry Foggle	6 furlongs	1:10.40	$40,075	Listed	
1986	Sugar's Image	5	José A. Vélez Jr.	Happy Alter	Alter's Racing Stable	6 furlongs	1:11.20	$49,560		
1985	Nany	5	Gene St. Leon	Richard R. Root	Harry T. Mangurian Jr.	6 furlongs	1:09.80	$48,920		
1984	Race not held									
1983	Prime Prospect	5	Donald MacBeth	Stanley M. Hough	Diana M. Firestone	6 furlongs	1:10.80	$40,470		
1982	Race not held									
1981	Island Charm	4	Jorge Velásquez	Stephen A. DiMauro	David A. McKibbin	6 furlongs	1:10.60	$37,560		

Notes:
† Gulfstream Park administration moved the event to earlier in their 2011–12 meeting from January to December. Hence, there were two runnings of the event in the calendar year (2011)

== See also ==
- List of American and Canadian Graded races
