= Stanley M. Hough =

American horse trainer

Personal information
- Born: February 20, 1948 (age 78) Palatine, Illinois
- Occupation: Trainer

Horse racing career
- Sport: Horse racing
- Career wins: 2,150+ (ongoing)

Major racing wins
- Memorial Day Handicap (1977, 1978); Bahamas Stakes (1980); Youthful Stakes (1980); Aqueduct Handicap (1981); Bay Shore Stakes (1981); Blue Grass Stakes (1981); Excelsior Handicap (1981); Gallorette Handicap (1981); Gotham Stakes (1981); Ballerina Stakes (1982); Japan Cup (1982); Knickerbocker Handicap (1982); Saranac Stakes (1982); Tampa Bay Derby (1982); Susan's Girl Stakes (1985); Secretariat Stakes (1989); Sanford Stakes (1991); Saratoga Special Stakes (1991, 1996); Astoria Stakes (1992, 2003, 2004); Lexington Stakes (1992); Schuylerville Stakes (1992); Cowdin Stakes (1993); Hialeah Turf Cup Handicap (1993); Sword Dancer Invitational Handicap (1993); Tremont Stakes (1993); Davona Dale Stakes (1998); Sorority Stakes (2003); Bold Ruler Handicap (2004); United Nations Stakes (2004); Longfellow Stakes (2004); Mac Diarmida Handicap (2004); Regret Stakes (2004); Astarita Stakes (2005); Plate Trial Stakes (2005); Bowling Green Handicap (2005); Kelso Stakes (2007); Matron Stakes (2009); Distaff Handicap (2010); Jerome Handicap (2011); Sugar Swirl Stakes (2011)

Racing awards
- Leading trainer at Calder Race Course (1976, 1977, 1978, 1979,1980)

Honours
- Calder Race Course Hall of Fame (1996)

Significant horses
- Caller I. D., Discreet Cat, Discreetly Mine; Half Iced, Proud Appeal, You and I

Stanley M. Hough (/ˌhɒf/; born February 20, 1948, in Palatine, Illinois) is an American Thoroughbred horse racing trainer. The son of Chicago-based Thoroughbred owner/trainer Joseph Hough, he embarked on a training career of his own in 1969.

For the five years from 1976 through 1980, Stanley Hough was the leading trainer at Calder Race Course in Miami Gardens, Florida. During that stretch, he won a track record five races on a single card on May 12, 1977, and went on to win a record 110 races for the full year. Among his top successes, in 1982 Stanley Hough won the prestigious Japan Cup when his Half Iced defeated such greats as April Run and U.S. Hall of Fame inductees John Henry and All Along.

Stanley Hough was inducted in the Calder Race Course Hall of Fame in 1996.
