= Japan Cup =

Flat G1 horse race in Japan

Coordinates: 35°39′45″N 139°29′6″E

- Previous: 2025 Japan Cup; November 30, 2025; Next: 2026 Japan Cup; November 29, 2026
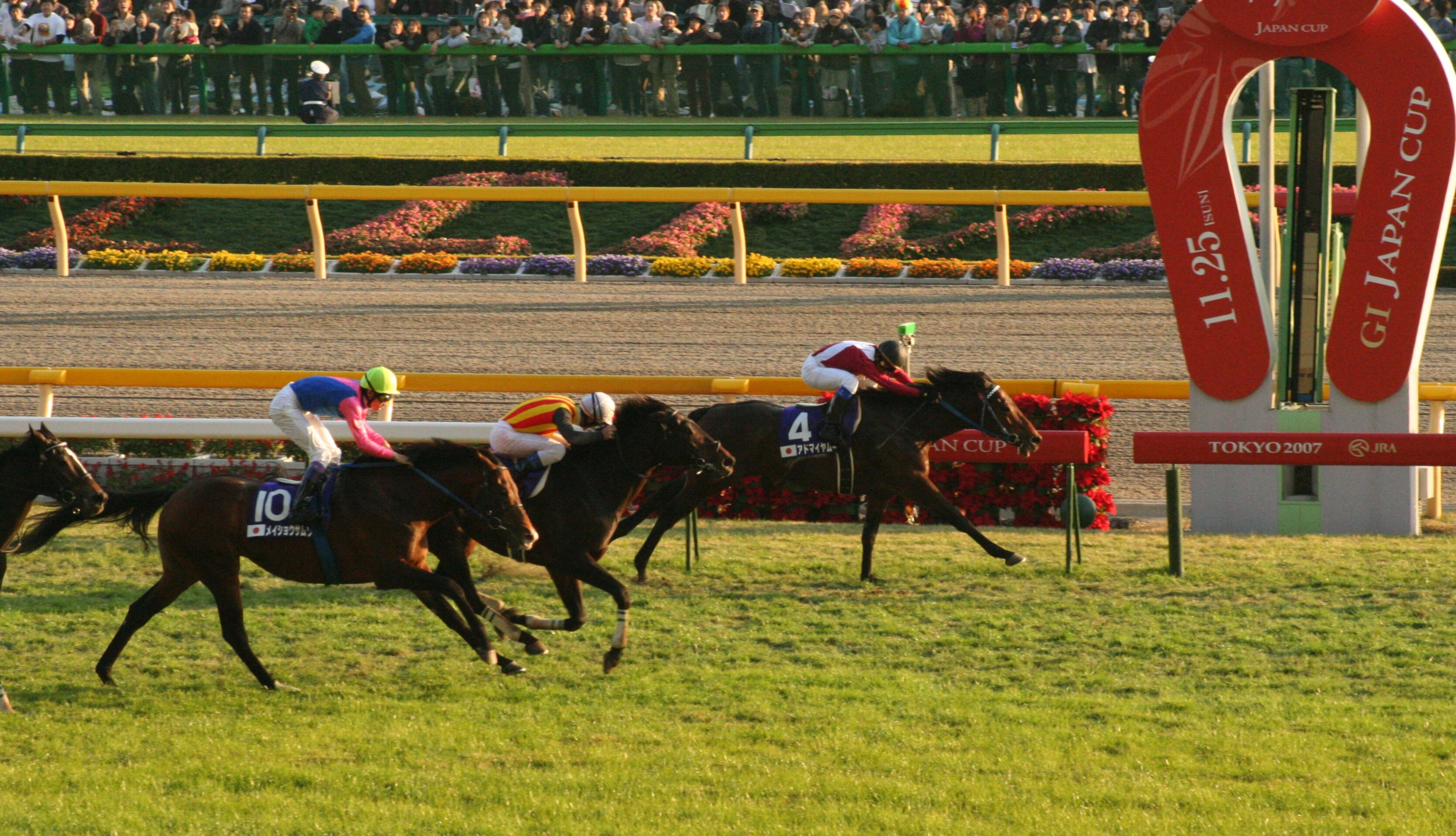
- ジャパンカップ (Japan Kappu)
- Class: Group 1
- Location: Tokyo Racecourse; Fuchū, Tokyo, Japan
- Inaugurated: 22 November 1981 (45 years ago)
- Race type: Thoroughbred
- Sponsor: Longines
- Website: Japan Cup - Racing Information

Race information
- Distance: 2,400 metres (about 12 furlongs / 1 1/2 miles)
- Record: Calandagan, 2:20.3
- Surface: Turf
- Track: Left-handed
- Qualification: 3-year-olds & up, Thoroughbreds (safety factor: 18 horses; up to ten foreign-trained starters are allowed in the race)
- Weight: 3-year-old 56 kg / 4-year-old & up 58 kg Allowances: 2 kg for fillies and mares; 2 kg for S. Hemisphere 3-year-olds
- Purse: ¥ 1,090,000,000 (as of 2025); 1st: ¥ 500,000,000; 2nd: ¥ 200,000,000; 3rd ¥ 130,000,000
- Bonuses: Additional money awarded if winner won in qualified international races (see below) plus ¥ 3,500,000 to the winning owner.: Winner of Tennō Shō (Autumn), Japan Cup, Arima Kinen; Domestic: ¥ 300,000,000; International: ¥ 150,000,000

The Japan Cup (ジャパンカップ, Japan Kappu; JPN G-1) is a Group 1 horse race in Japan, held annually on the last Sunday of November, post time of 15:40 at Tokyo Racecourse in Fuchū, Tokyo. It is a flat race run over a distance of 2,400 m (1.49 mi; 11.93 furlongs) with a maximum of 18 horses.

First run in 1981, the Japan Cup was instituted by the Japan Racing Association (JRA) to give local horses the opportunity to compete against those of international calibre and to promote goodwill within the racing community worldwide. Similar to the Prix de l'Arc de Triomphe, the Melbourne Cup and the Breeders' Cup, the Japan Cup extends invitations to top-performing horses aged three and above from around the world. The race is one of the world's richest, with a total prize purse of over one billion yen since 2023, and regularly attracts an audience of 100,000 people. It is the middle leg of the Japanese "Autumn Triple Crown" along with the Tennō Shō (Autumn) and the Arima Kinen.

Despite a short history, the Japan Cup has established itself as an international contest with winners from all over the world, and it is regularly ranked highly in the International Federation of Horseracing Authorities (IFHA)'s Top 100 Group 1 Races of the Year compilation due to its high quality and depth of racers. In its early history, the race was dominated by foreign horses, with eight of the first ten winners coming from abroad. However, in recent years the number of overseas entries has significantly declined, and in the last 20 years only one horse from outside of Japan has won.

== Course ==
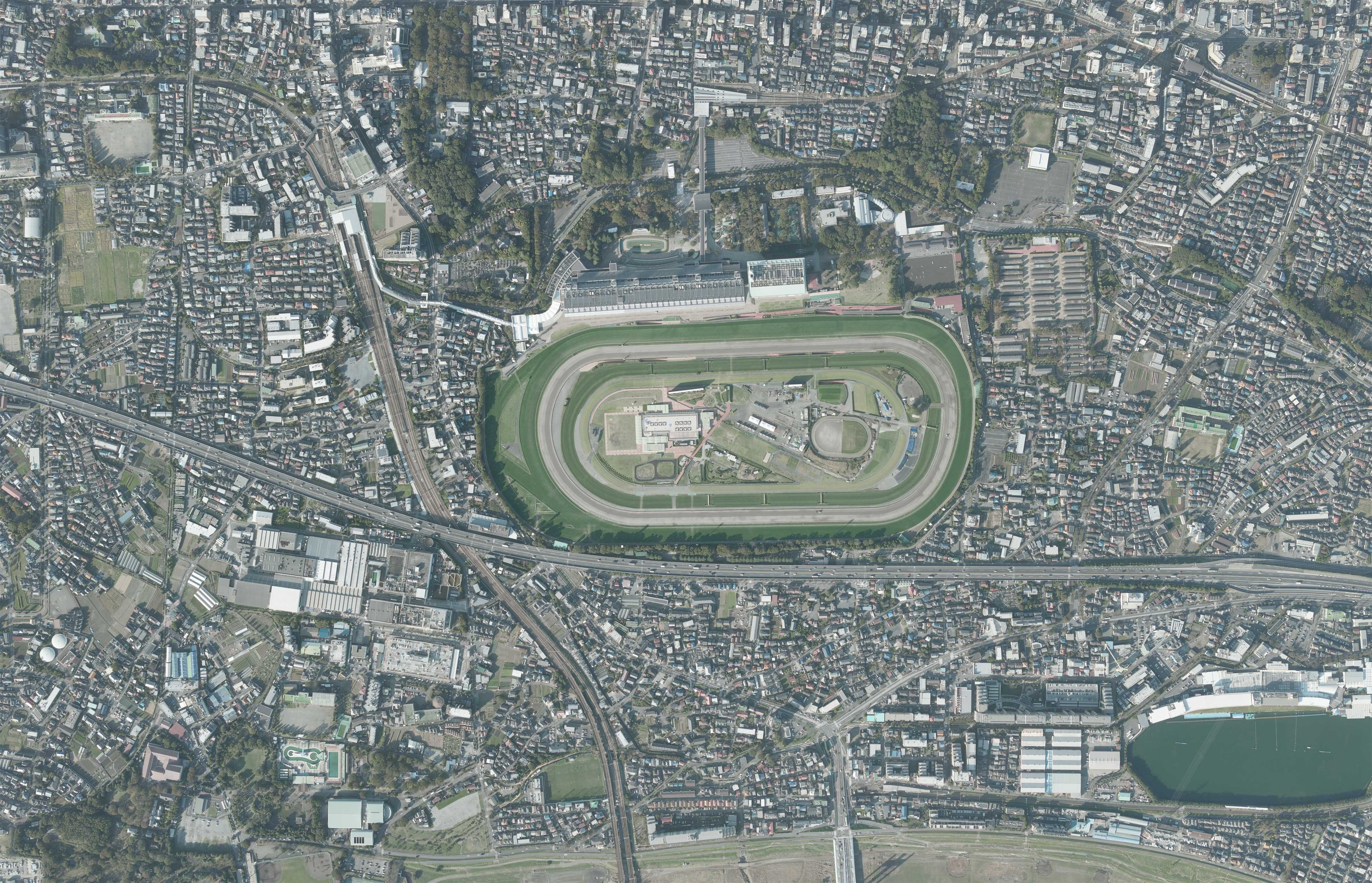
Aerial view of the Tokyo Racecourse taken in 2019

The Japan Cup is held at the Tokyo Racecourse, in the western Tokyo suburb of Fuchū. At 2,400 m (1.49 mi; 11.93 furlongs), the race is run counter-clockwise around the oval turf track, which uses a blend of Noshiba grass and Italian ryegrass. The Cup uses Tokyo Racecourse's A-course configuration, placing the track's fence rail in its innermost position. This means the circumference measures 2,083 m (1.29 mi; 10.35 furlongs) and the width varies from 31 to 41 m (102 to 135 ft), offering competitors ample room to manoeuvre and overtake in ways that are not always available in similar-length races.

The track has several undulations, varying in size and length, with a sharp rise of 1.2 m (4 ft) over 60 m (200 ft) halfway through being one of the more challenging obstacles. The homestretch is one of the longest in Japanese racing at 525 m (1,722 ft), often leading to dramatic late surges. At 400 m (1,310 ft) to the post, there is a sharp two metres of elevation gain over the next 120 m (394 ft), requiring jockeys to conserve their horse's stamina to overcome this final hurdle. The final stretch is flat, allowing racers to focus entirely on one last spurt of speed towards the post.

Due to its length and demanding finish, the race tends to favour strong closers who can handle the uphill run and quickly accelerate in the final straight. There is a long 325 m (1,066 ft) before the first corner. While theoretically this minimises early positional advantages, analysis of the 2014 to 2024 races shows that horses starting near the inner fence are significantly more likely to win.

== History ==
=== Early years ===
==== Inaugural running ====
The Japan Cup's creation was motivated by the JRA's desire to ensure the horses racing in Japan measured up to the quality of international horses. Prior to its creation, and even in the years after, options were limited in Japan for foreign horses. Most races only allowed Japanese horses to compete, leaving Japan's horses isolated from the outside world. (Note: Japanese horses had on rare occasions competed abroad before 1981. However, outside of Hakuchikara's victory at the 1959 Washington's Birthday Handicap, their results were "a series of humiliating defeats", leading trainers at the time to view taking their horses outside Japan as a futile endeavour.) As such, the Japan Cup offered an opportunity to determine how Japan compared to the rest of the world on their home turf. The idea of "creating strong horses that can compete on the world stage" had been proposed by the JRA since at least the 1970s. However, early efforts to establish an international race during that decade failed, owing to a lack of interest from overseas racing authorities and domestic concerns of foreign competition disrupting the stud market. By the start of the 1980s, the JRA's relations with the main racing authorities in other countries had developed enough for them to host their proposed race.

The finish of the inaugural 1981 Japan Cup, with Mairzy Doates (furthest right, pink cap) passing the post one length ahead of Frost King (nearest the rail, white cap). The best performing Japanese horse, Gold Spencer (yellow cap), can be seen some distance behind the two front runners. (Note: Screenshot is from the Sky Racing documentary Global Impact: The Rise of the Japanese Thoroughbred.)

The inaugural Japan Cup took place in 1981, scheduled for late November to target the traditional Western horseracing off-season and to avoid competing with October's Prix de l'Arc de Triomphe. Invitations were sent to trainers in Japan, the United States, Canada and India. (Note: Although Britain and France had been considered important countries to include during the race's initial development, the JRA decided against extending invitations to them due to limited ties with their respective racing authorities. This decision was heavily criticised by Japanese media in the build-up to the race.) A horse from Turkey, Dersim, was also invited, but was injured shortly after arriving in Japan and could not compete. The original line-up of international horses was at the time deemed nothing special. The most prestigious of the group was The Very One, a veteran horse with many graded stakes victories, but by then six and a half years old, an advanced age for a top-level thoroughbred. (Note: A thoroughbred horse's peak performance typically occurs between four and five years old.) Conversely, in Japan the country's entered horses were viewed as an "all star cast", featuring the top three placing racers in the year's recent autumn Tennō Shō.

The race was won by American mare Mairzy Doates, ridden by Cash Asmussen, who finished a length (Note: A common horseracing measure in race results that represents the average length of a horse, around 8 ft (2.4 m).) ahead of Canadian-trained Frost King. Japan's best performer, Gold Spencer, placed fifth. The disparity between the Japanese and foreign horses' performances came as a major surprise to the JRA officials and wider Japanese horseracing industry, and the race is credited as a turning point in Japan's efforts to seriously compete at an international level in horse racing. When writing about the first Cup's events, historian Ryōji Motomura noted the depth of the initial Japanese disappointment: "Those who watched that race must have sighed in deep regret, thinking that it would be another 20 years before a Japanese horse won the Japan Cup, something that would happen in the 21st century."

==== Runnings in the 1980s ====
In the Cup's second year, the range of invited countries was expanded to include participation from Europe and Oceania. However, the race was once again won by an American horse. Half Iced, the last international horse to enter the race, narrowly defeated French-trained fillies All Along and April Run, with the Irish mare Stanerra in fourth. Once again, the best performing Japanese horse, Hikari Duel, placed fifth.

Stanerra returned the next year after a successful season in Europe, having recently won the Group 2 Prince of Wales's Stakes and Group 1 (Note: An international grading standard regulated by the IFHA that denotes a race as having major international importance and where the partaking racers are expected to be of a very high standard.) Joe McGrath Memorial Stakes, winning the Cup by a head over Japanese-trained Kyoei Promise. Stanerra's victory was highlighted by the Liverpool Daily Post as an example of the growing trend in the 1980s of European mares matching the racing performance of stallions. Her victory is also credited with strengthening the Republic of Ireland's diplomatic relations with Japan; since 1990, the Irish Government traditionally presents the Cup's winner with the Ambassador of Ireland Prize.

1984 was the first year Japanese horse races received official grading, classifying the Cup as a national-level Group 1 race. (Note: Upgraded to international Group 1 status in 1992.) The race itself was the first-ever showdown between two Japanese Triple Crown winners: Mr. C. B. and the undefeated Symboli Rudolf. They had won their Crowns a year apart, nearly 20 years after Shinzan became the last horse to do so in 1963, leading to much discussion by Japanese fans over which of the two horses were superior. There was an expectation that one of them would be the first Japanese horse to win the event in the "Triple Crown Showdown". However, it was the lesser-fancied Japanese Katsuragi Ace who claimed victory, defeating British-trained Bedtime by 1 1/2 lengths, with Symboli Rudolf narrowly behind in third and Mr C. B. trailing in tenth. Japan achieved a second victory the next year, with Symboli Rudolf returning to triumph over Japanese-trained Rocky Tiger.

In 1986, Jupiter Island, ridden by Pat Eddery, became the first British-trained horse to win the Cup, narrowly defeating fellow British runner Allez Milord. The result was only confirmed after an inquiry by racecourse stewards following an objection by Allez Milord's rider Greville Starkey, who alleged the two horses had collided 60 metres from the post. Jupiter Island's victory more than doubled the previous prize money the horse had accumulated in his previous forty starts, and at seven years old, he remains the oldest horse to win the Cup.

Le Glorieux, trained in France by Robert Collet and ridden by Alain Lequeux, captured the 1987 edition, while Pay the Butler, trained by Robert J. Frankel and ridden by Chris McCarron, secured the United States' third victory the year after. Having previously only won a single major race, the Group 2 Red Smith Handicap ran six months prior, Pay the Butler's win was regarded as a major upset over the year's Prix de l'Arc de Triomphe winner Tony Bin and Japanese favourites Oguri Cap and Tamamo Cross.

=== A decade of global competition ===
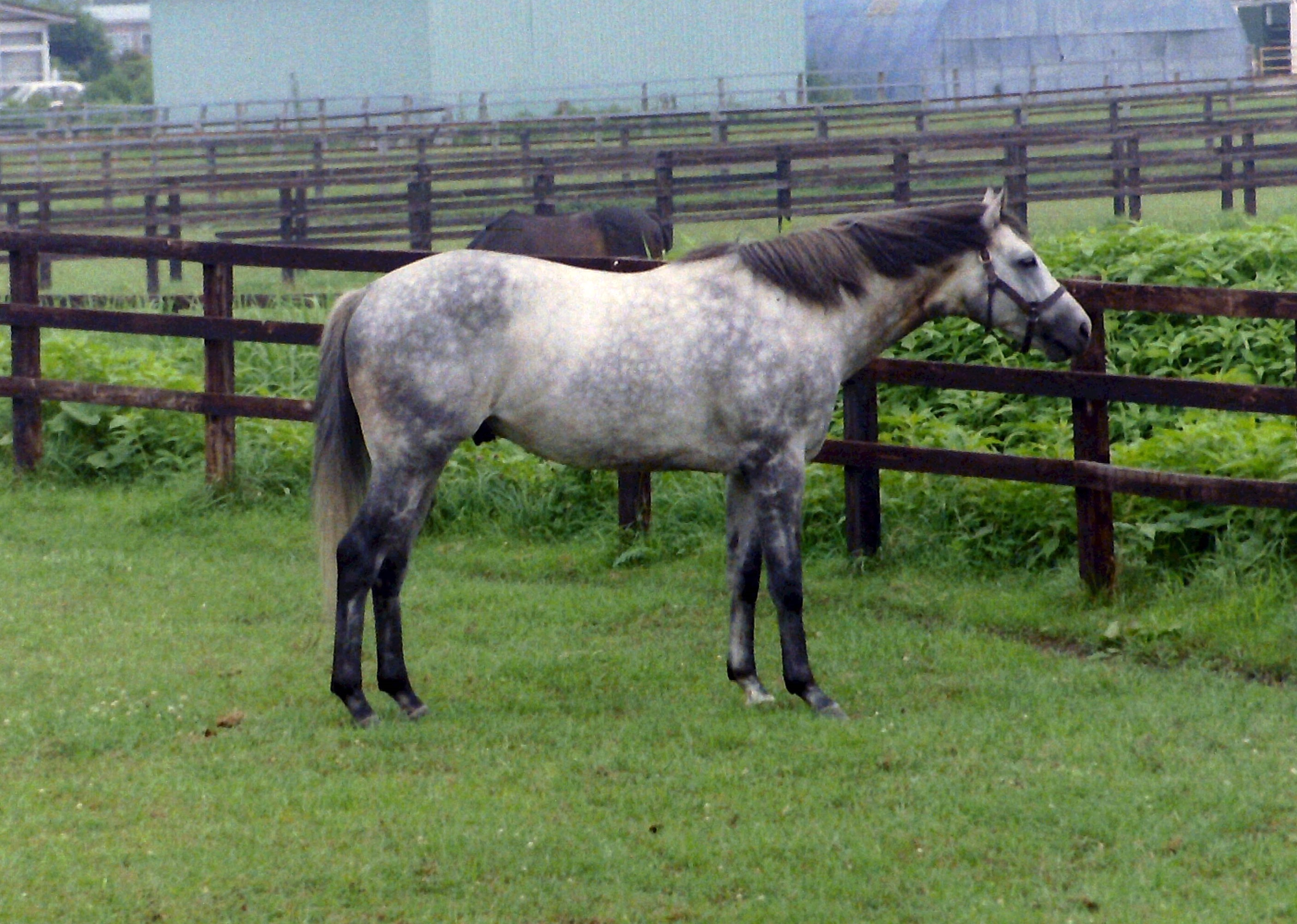
Oguri Cap, a rare triple entrant in the early days of the Japan Cup (1988—1990)

New Zealand mare Horlicks beat Oguri Cap by a neck in 1989, setting a new world record time for 2,400 metres and becoming Australia and New Zealand's highest stakes winner. Her win marked the beginning of a decade of several countries vying for supremacy. Better Loosen Up became the first Australian winner in 1990, prevailing in a close finish over France's Ode and Britain's Cacoethes. In 1991, the United States achieved its fourth victory in the Cup with Golden Pheasant. The horse, a rare example of a thoroughbred jointly owned by two parties (Los Angeles Kings ice hockey team owner Bruce McNall and star player Wayne Gretzky), has been described as the final major triumph for American-trained entrants in the Cup.

Japanese-trained horses triumphed the next three years, although each time an overseas horse placed second. Tokai Teio emerged victorious in 1992, followed by Legacy World in 1993 and Marvelous Crown in 1994. The 1993 race also saw the only instance in the Cup's history of a fine being issued; the French horse Kotashaan's jockey, Kent Desormeaux, was fined $460 (equivalent to $1,000 in 2025) for easing his horse after mistaking the 100-metre mark for the finish.

Despite bookmakers expecting a fourth straight Japanese win through Hishi Amazon, in 1995 the Cup was won for the first time by a German-trained horse, Lando. The race, which Lando's jockey Michael Roberts considers his greatest memory, was a significant milestone for German entrants; previously, the only German horse to place in the top five was Platini in 1993. The race was also the first time no Japanese-born horse placed in the top five, with Narita Brian finishing sixth 1 3/4 lengths behind the American Awad.

British trainer Michael Stoute captured back-to-back victories, winning with the Irish horses Singspiel in 1996 and Pilsudski in 1997. Singspiel's nose-length victory made him Britain's leading prize money earner, while Pilsudski's win marked both his final career start and the fifth country in which he won a Group 1 race. Singspiel's jockey, Frankie Dettori, was also originally scheduled to ride in 1997, on the British horse Mons. However, Dettori was replaced a week before by John Reid after receiving a riding ban. Dettori, who in his initial response stated his shock at having to miss the Japan Cup, had to wait until 2002 to enter the race again and secure his second Cup victory.

=== Japanese dominance ===
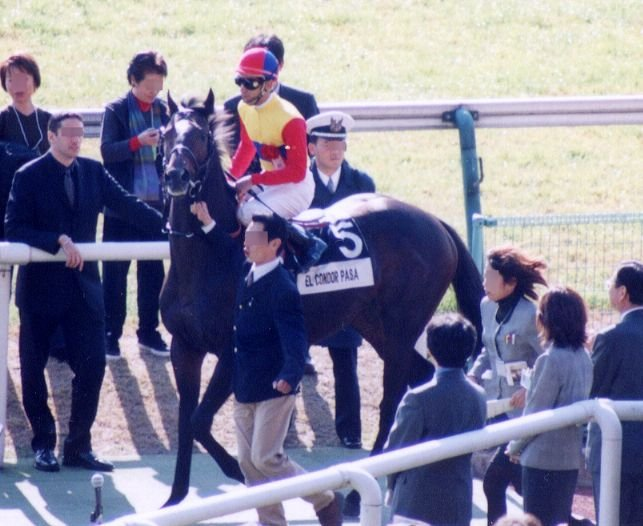
El Condor Pasa, the winner of the 1998 Japan Cup

Between 1998 and 2004, the Japanese contingent's performance shifted noticeably. In 1998, El Condor Pasa led a historic sweep for Japan, finishing ahead of Air Groove and Special Week in the race's first-ever Japanese trifecta. Special Week went on to win the next year's race against a strong international field, including the year's Prix de l'Arc de Triomphe winner Montjeu from Ireland. Yutaka Take, Special Week's jockey, remarked at the time it'd been a long-term career goal to win the event; Take went on to win the Cup several times over the next three decades.

In 2000, the Japanese horse T. M. Opera O entered the Japan Cup unbeaten for the season and maintained his year-long record, defeating his fellow Japanese rivals Meisho Doto and Fantastic Light by, respectively, a neck and a nose behind in third. With this victory's prize money, T. M. Opera O became the highest-earning racehorse in world history at ¥1,216,477,000 (equivalent to ¥1.355×10^{9} in 2024), overtaking the North American record held by Cigar and the previous Japanese record held by Special Week. T. M. Opera O went on to win the year's Arima Kinen; having already won the year's autumn Tennō Shō, he was awarded an additional ¥200,000,000 (equivalent to ¥223,000,000 in 2024) by the JRA for winning the three races, an accomplishment dubbed as completing the "Autumn Triple Crown". The same reward has been offered every year since to any horse that is able to win all three races.

T. M. Opera O could not repeat his success the year after, losing to Jungle Pocket by a neck. For the first time Japanese-trained horses filled the top five positions. Golan, trained by Michael Stoute, was the best foreign finisher of the race in sixth.

The Japan Cup was temporarily moved in 2002 to Nakayama Racecourse because Tokyo Racecourse was being renovated. The race was held on the right-handed outer loop course, switching the race's direction and reducing its distance to 2,200 m (1.37 mi; 10.94 furlongs). (Note: Nakayama Racecourse's turf track does not have a 2,400 m configuration.) The year also brought Italy's greatest success in the event, with the Italian-trained Falbrav securing a narrow victory over the American-trained Sarafan, with Japanese runner Symboli Kris S finishing a close third.

The Cup returned to Tokyo the next year, where Tap Dance City went wire-to-wire to achieve the largest winning margin ever recorded in the race's history at nine lengths. The 2004 race saw Zenno Rob Roy lead another Japanese sweep of the podium, against a series of lacklustre performances from the international racers. Having won the year's autumn Tennō Shō, Zenno Rob Roy went on to triumph in the Arima Kinen the following month, becoming the second, and most recent, horse to achieve the Autumn Triple Crown.

=== International win drought ===
In 2005, British-trained Alkaased, ridden by Frankie Dettori, won in a photo finish over the Japanese horse Heart's Cry, with Zenno Rob Roy finishing third. The race set a new world record for the race's 2,400 metres at 2:22.1, surpassing the previous record set by Horlicks in 1989. Moreover, this was the final victory by a foreign horse for nearly two decades.

In 2006, a few weeks after being disqualified from the year's Prix de l'Arc de Triomphe after testing positive for ipratropium, Deep Impact returned to racing in his home country at the Japan Cup and secured victory in his career's penultimate race. Partly because of this victory, he was later named Japanese Horse of the Year for the second consecutive year. Similar circumstances occurred the following year, when Admire Moon won the Cup by a head over Pop Rock; this was Admire Moon's final race before retiring and being crowned 2007's Japanese Horse of the Year.

Screen Hero was considered an outsider in the 2008 race, having competed in only four races that year following an 11-month hiatus because of a leg injury. Sent off at odds of 40-1, he defied expectations to win the race, finishing half a length ahead of Deep Sky.

After finishing fourth in 2007 and third in 2008, Vodka finally claimed victory in her third attempt at the Japan Cup in 2009, winning in a photo finish over the 2008 Kikuka-shō winner Oken Bruce Lee. Vodka's final time of 2:22.4 was the third-fastest in the race's history, and it was the first time a Japanese mare had won the event, as well as making her the first mare worldwide to earn over $10 million (roughly ¥ 936,000,000) in prize money in their career.

The 2010 race ended with a controversial disqualification. Buena Vista, the race favourite, finished first past the post two lengths ahead of Rose Kingdom. However, an inquiry relegated Buena Vista to second position, having determined she had abruptly veered inward on the final straight and impeded Rose Kingdom's progress. This meant Rose Kingdom was declared the winner. The disqualification was unpopular both within Japan and internationally because of Buena Vista's strong performance in the race, with the race's stewards being labelled incompetent, resulting in the JRA revising its inquiry rules to meet international horse racing standards. Buena Vista returned in 2011 to claim the title outright.

=== Double victories and Triple Crown showdowns ===
==== Gentildonna ====
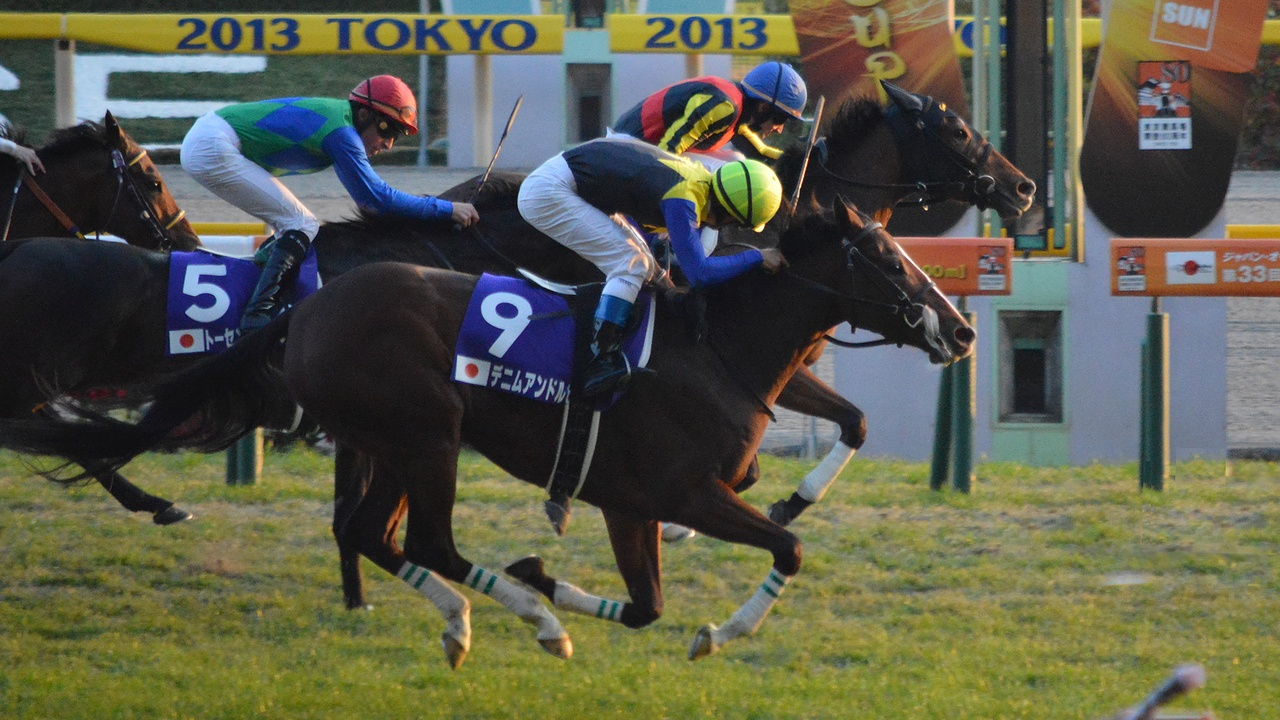
Gentildonna nosing out Denim and Ruby at the 2013 Japan Cup, becoming the first double winner

In 2012, the final stretch of the race came down to Orfevre, the 2011 Japanese Triple Crown winner, facing off against the 2012 Fillies' Triple Crown (Note: Often referred to as the Japanese Triple Tiara.) winner Gentildonna. In a closely contested ending, Gentildonna claimed victory by a nose. However, a stewards' inquiry afterwards confirmed that Gentildonna made contact with Orfevre in the final stretch. The result stood, but Gentildonna's jockey, Yasunari Iwata, was suspended for two days. Gentildonna returned the next year to win the Cup again, becoming the first horse to win the race twice. She attempted a third consecutive victory in 2014 in her final race, but came fourth whilst Epiphaneia, who had entered at the relatively low odds of 15–1, claimed victory.

The 2014 race was the first race in the event's history to be sponsored, after the JRA began searching for suitable sponsors the previous year following a gradual decade-long decline in turnover. 2014 also saw the first release of the International Federation of Horseracing Authorities' "Top 100 Group 1 Races of the Year for 3yo's and upwards", a report which ranks Group 1 races by the average IFHA ratings of their top finishers over the previous three runnings. The Japan Cup placed eighth in the inaugural report, and since then has regularly placed in the top ten each year, including first in 2023 and 2025.

==== Almond Eye ====
The Japanese filly Shonan Pandora captured the 2015 race, becoming the seventh mare to win the Japan Cup. Kitasan Black went wire-to-wire to comfortably win the year after, with fellow Japanese racers Sounds of Earth and Cheval Grand finishing second and third respectively, 2 1/2 lengths behind Kitasan Black. Cheval Grand returned next year to claim victory, with the win securing the top position in the 2016 Longines World's Best Jockey Rankings for his rider Hugh Bowman.

In 2018 Alkaased's course record was broken, when Almond Eye clocked 2:20.6 on firm ground. The race was another all-Japanese sweep, with Almond Eye finishing 1 3/4 lengths ahead of Kiseki, with Suave Richard in third. Her performance was highly praised by commentators, including a recognition as "one of the best racehorses in the world".

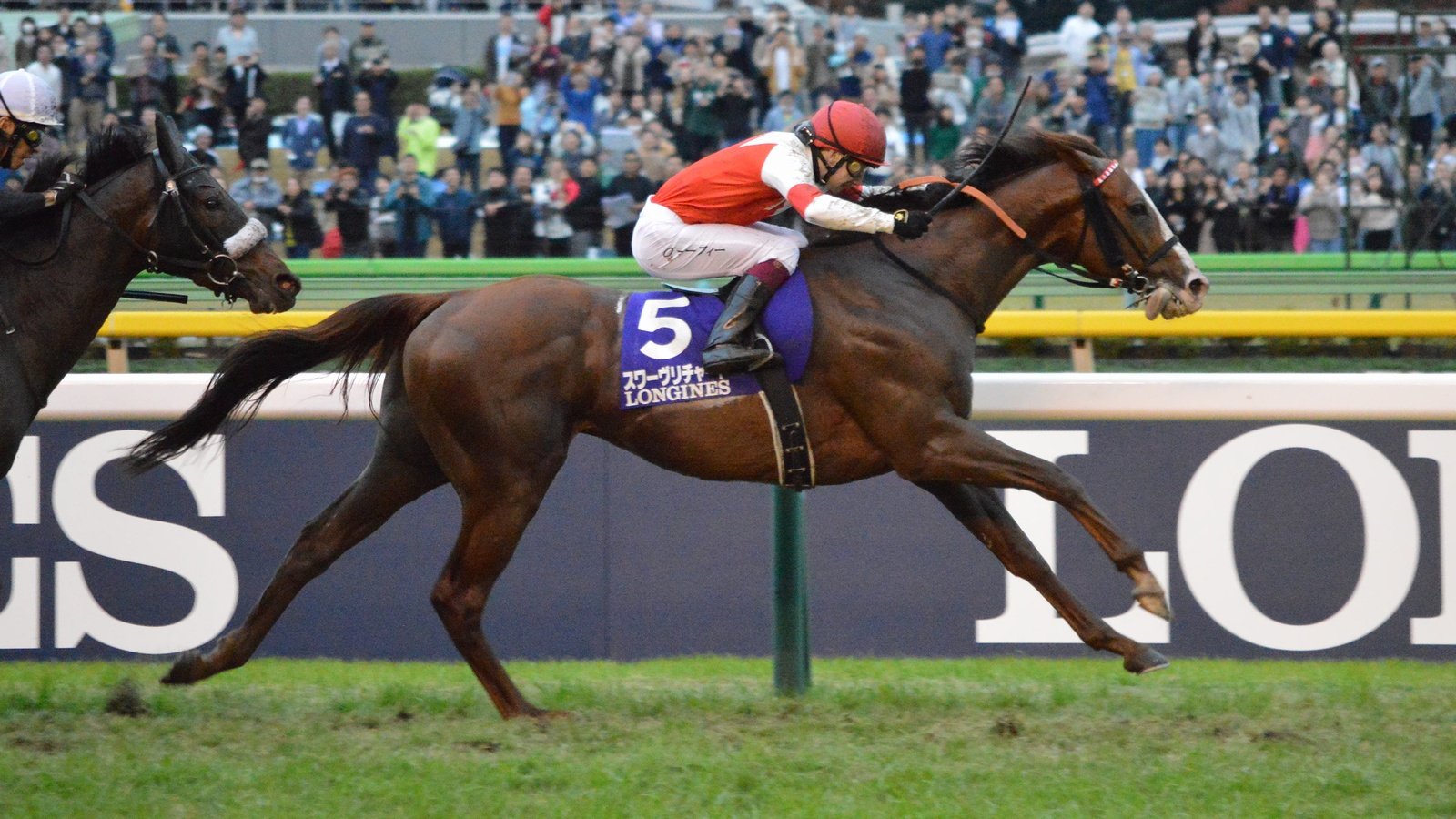
Suave Richard crossing the finish line in first place at the 2019 Japan Cup

2019's Japan Cup was the first in which all the entrants were domestic racers, with no international horses signing up for the event. It was also a memorial race for the late Deep Impact, who had been euthanised in July earlier that year. Several runners, including runner-up Curren Bouquetd'or and third-placed Wagnerian, were progeny of Deep Impact. Suave Richard, who was sired by Heart's Cry, delivered a strong late run to win under the year's British Champion Jockey, Oisin Murphy.

There was a significant amount of excitement prior to the 2020 Japan Cup because of its very strong line-up, which featured three Japanese Triple Crown winners; the 2018 Fillies Triple Crown winner Almond Eye, the undefeated 2020 Triple Crown winner Contrail, and the undefeated 2020 Fillies Triple Crown winner Daring Tact. These three horses all placed in the top three, with Almond Eye triumphing in the Cup again by 1 1/4 lengths over Contrail and Daring Tact. Due to the COVID-19 pandemic, 2020 recorded the lowest crowd attendance in the race's history by a significant margin at 4,604 people, following the JRA's decision to hold all of their races that year behind closed doors.

=== Recent races ===
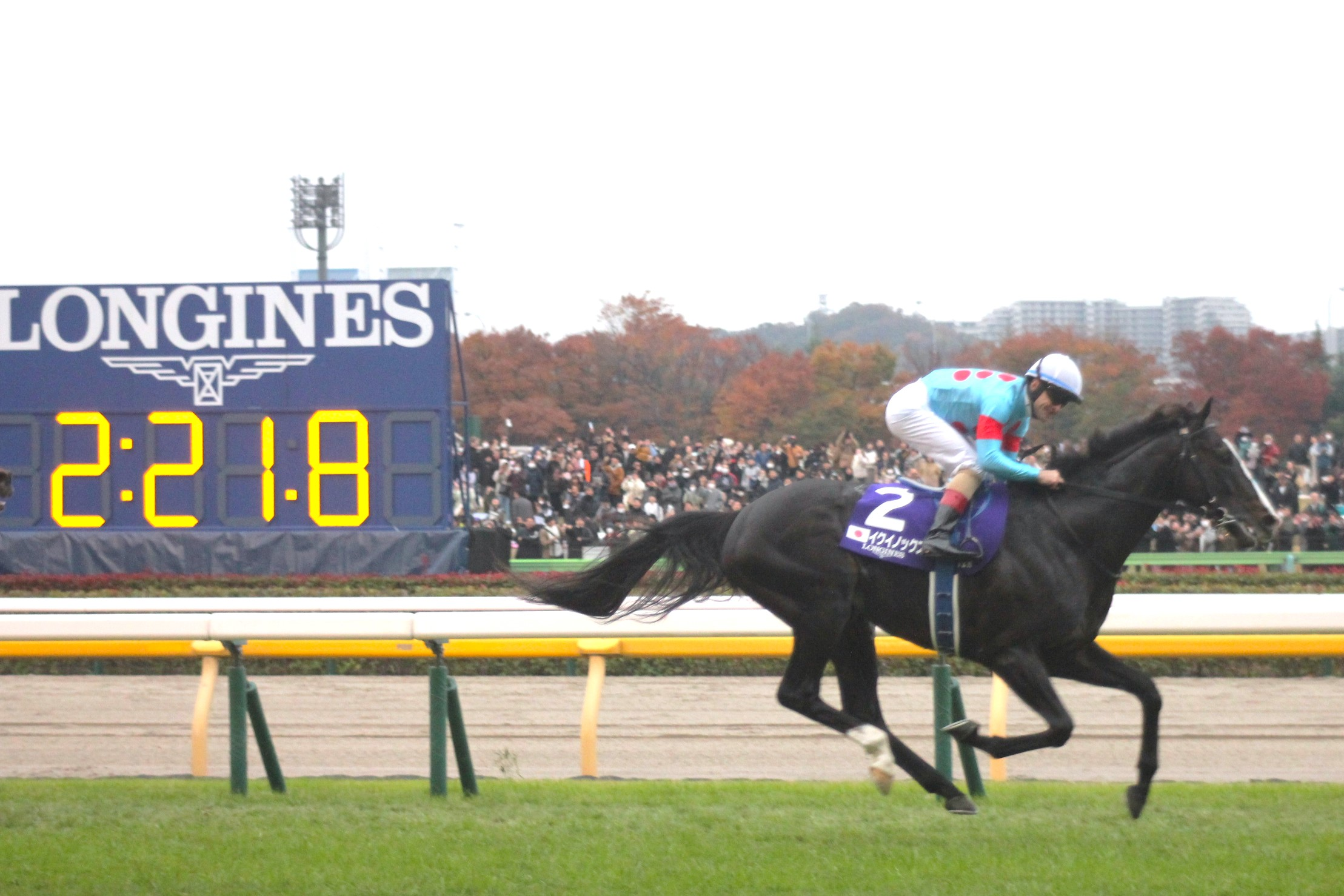
Equinox at the 2023 Japan Cup

Contrail avenged his loss from the previous year by winning the 2021 Cup in his final race before retirement, finishing two lengths ahead of the Japanese Authority. Despite racing only three times previously in the year, his prior performance meant Contrail had been the odds-on favourite, and his victory at the Cup contributed to him securing the 2021 JRA award for Best Older Colt or Horse.

Vela Azul was the victor in 2022, his first Group 1 title. The horse had spent the majority of his previous races (16 out of 21) on dirt tracks, only switching to turf at the Awaji Tokubetsu allowance race in March 2022, five races before the Japan Cup. The race favourite, Shahryar, placed second, and in the closing moments of the race was involved in an incident where he drifted left in the closing stages, significantly impeding Danon Beluga's progress. The JRA stewards judged this careless riding and banned Shahryar's rider, Cristian Demuro, from racing for four days.

2023 was another year with a line-up considered especially strong, featuring multiple Group 1 winners such as the year's Saudi Cup's winner Panthalassa and the seventh Japanese Triple Tiara winner Liberty Island. In spite of the quality of the competition Equinox, the world's highest-rated horse and who was on a streak of five G1 wins, won in a victory widely described by reporters and the race's commentators as a commanding win. The strength of Equinox's performance, combined with the field's depth, led to two honours: Equinox was named the year's World's Best Racehorse by the IFHA, and the Japan Cup the IFHA's World's Best Horse Race.

Running near the back for much of the race, Do Deuce surged forward in the final stretch to win the 2024 Cup in his penultimate race, resulting in him being awarded both the year's JRA Japanese Horse of the Year and the JRA Award for Best Older Colt or Horse awards. It also secured jockey Yutaka Take's record fifth win in the event's history.

==== Calandagan breaks the streak ====
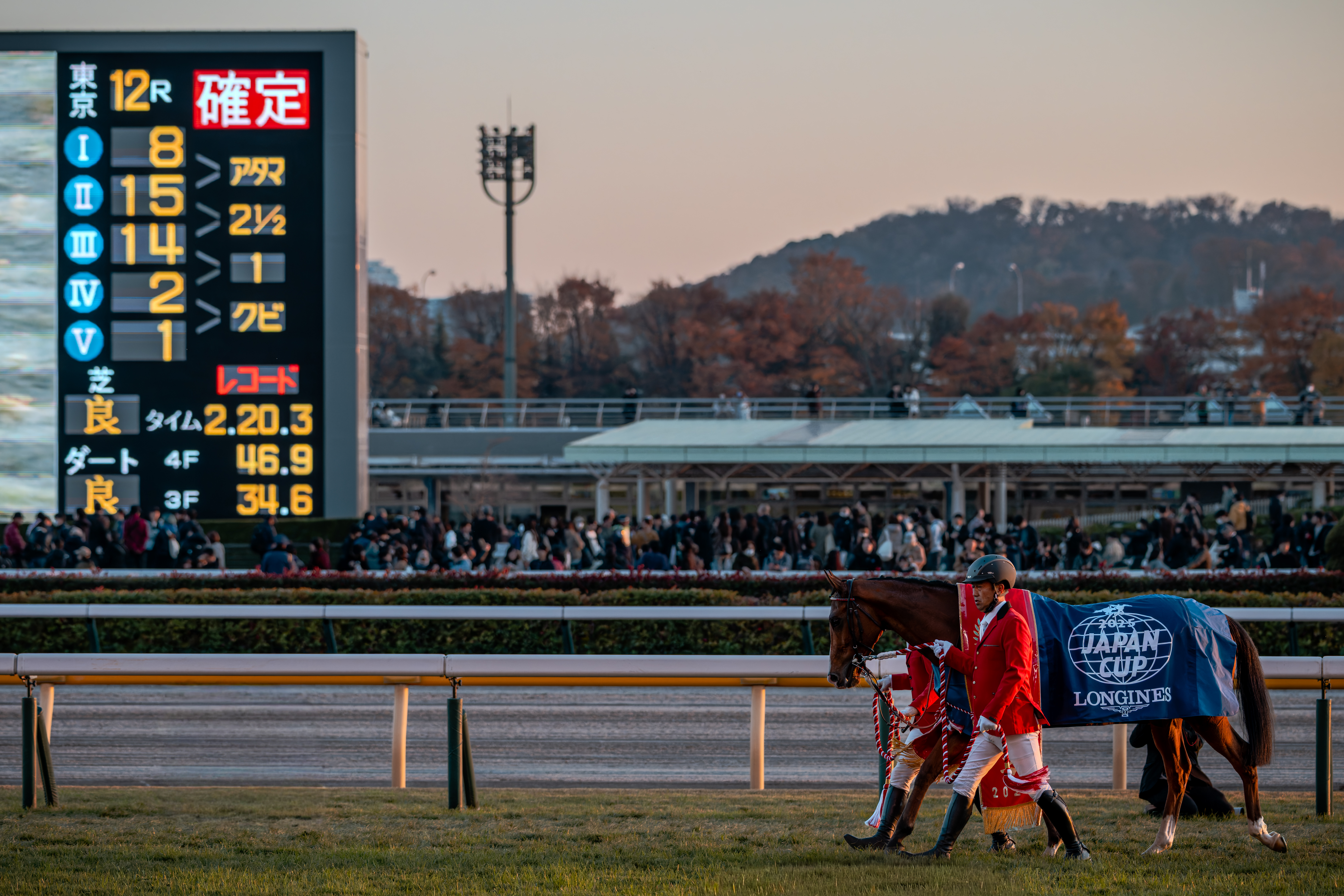
Calandagan after winning the 2025 Japan Cup

The French-trained Calandagan was the sole entrant from outside of Japan in 2025. However, in the lead-up to the event he was considered one of the best overseas participants in recent years, having previously won three Group 1 races in the year, being ranked at the top of the Longines World's Best Racehorses Rankings, and having recently been declared the Cartier Horse of the Year. Calandagan lived up to his strong reputation, surging in the last 300 metres to beat Masquerade Ball by a head, breaking Almond Eye's world record for 2,400 metres on turf and marking the end of Japan's winning streak of 19 years. The race itself also drew attention from fans and reporters for featuring three jockeys getting thrown off their horses; Yuga Kawada who fell off Admire Terra at the start of the race, and later Christophe Lemaire on Masquerade Ball and Keita Tosaki on Danon Decile, who collided after Masquerade Ball tried to avoid the jockeyless Admire Terra.

== Decline in international participation ==
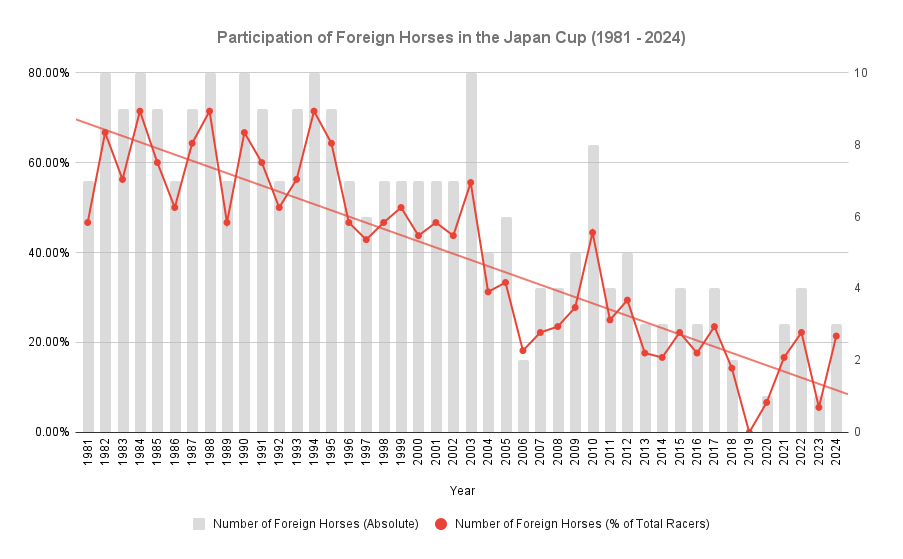
Participation of foreign horses in the Japan Cup (1981—2024), by total number and %

Between the American horse Alkaased's and the Irish horse Calandagan's victories in 2005 and 2025, only one non-Japanese horse has placed in the top three: the British Ouija Board, who was third in 2006. All other top-three placers in this 20-year period were born and trained in Japan, except for the 2024 runner-up Shin Emperor, who was born in France and brought over to Japan as a foal. The number of international horses has also declined; while over half of the horses in the inaugural race were from abroad, by 2024 there were only three. In more extreme cases, the number was even lower; Iresine, a French horse, and Calandagan were the only entries from abroad in 2023 and 2025 respectively, and no foreign horses competed in 2019. This has led to commentators raising concerns about the Japan Cup maintaining its prestige or that the race has "lost its way". However, it has also been argued that the Cup's run of homogeneous winners since the 2000s is nothing unique and is instead an example of the home-advantage trends seen in other international races.

The decline in international interest is often attributed to the rise in the overall strength of Japanese horses since the early 2000s. The most commonly cited reason of this trend is the great success of leading sires Sunday Silence and Northern Taste, whose progeny from the 1990s onwards have consistently performed at a high level and produced numerous Group 1 winners. Additionally, the JRA has also encouraged trainers to breed their horses with international bloodlines to enhance their competitive edge, and has built facilities such as the Bloodhorse Training Center to facilitate further training and research.

The increasingly busy international racing calendar is a contributing factor to declining international numbers. In the Japan Cup's first years, November was "a time when once a comfortable silence fell over flat racing". However, since 1981, numerous high-profile worldwide competitions like the Breeders' Cup and the Hong Kong Vase have been established in the winter months. With similar levels of prestige and prize money, these races have given trainers a wider range of available international options, leading to suggestions that the Cup be moved to a less competitive time of the year.

Concerns have also been raised about the logistical challenges involved with bringing foreign horses to Japan. The process, which involves lengthy amounts of travel and quarantine, can distress the horses involved, further making the idea of racing in Japan unappealing to foreign horse owners. In 2022, the JRA opened a new quarantine stable near Tokyo Racecourse to help make travel to Japan for the Cup more enticing for trainers. The issues surrounding horses travelling from abroad have been noted as a problem since the early years of the Japan Cup. The 1983 winner Stanerra arrived in Tokyo in bad shape from the flight and required six hours of walking daily before her race to rebuild her strength, while the 1989 winner Horlicks required the use of a full-length mirror mired with other horses' scent to help overcome her stress and loneliness after arriving in Japan.

== Purse and qualification ==
Throughout its history, the Japan Cup has been repeatedly described as one of the world's richest races. (Note: Amongst other years; 1989, 1990, 1994, 2004, 2011, 2021.) In the original 1981 race, the prize pool totalled over ¥123,000,000 (equivalent to ¥174,000,000 in 2024), with ¥65,000,000 (equivalent to ¥91,800,000 in 2024) being awarded to the winner Mairzy Doates. The purse's size increased steadily over the years, with the prize pool nearly ¥250,000,000 (roughly US$3.61 million) by 1992. By 2023, the prize pool had reached over a billion yen.

While the list of qualifying races varies slightly each year, typically foreign horses that win notable Group 1 races outside of Japan will be invited to participate, with the incentive of an additional prize if they place well. Japanese horses undergo standard JRA selection based on previous performances and their total career earnings. Horses that participate in the race and have also achieved victory in other specific JRA races in the year will also be eligible for bonuses. For example, in 2025, the criteria were as follows:

Invitation and bonus criteria for the 2025 Japan Cup
Criteria	Races involved	Bonus
Foreign based horse invited after winning one of the following:	Arlington Million (USA); Breeders' Cup Turf (USA); Canadian International Stakes (CAN); Caulfield Cup (AUS); Champion Stakes (UK); Coronation Cup (UK); Cox Plate (AUS); The Derby (UK); Dubai Sheema Classic (UAE); Eclipse Stakes (UK); Grand Prix de Paris (FR); Grand Prix de Saint-Cloud (FR); Grosser Preis von Baden (GER); Grosser Preis von Berlin (GER); International Stakes (UK); Irish Champion Stakes (IRE); Irish Derby (IRE); Joe Hirsch Turf Classic (USA); King George VI & Queen Elizabeth Stakes (UK); Manhattan Stakes (USA); Melbourne Cup (AUS); Preis von Europa (GER); Prince of Wales's Stakes (UK); Prix de l'Arc de Triomphe (FR); Prix du Jockey Club (FR); Sword Dancer Stakes (USA); Tancred Stakes (AUS)	1st place in Japan Cup: US$3,000,000; 2nd place: US$1,200,000; 3rd place: US$750,000; 4th place: US$450,000; 5th place: US$300,000; 6th or lower: US$200,000
Other invitational horses:	N/A	US$100,000 regardless of placing
Horse wins any three of the following races in the same year:	Osaka Hai; Tennō Shō (Spring); Takarazuka Kinen; Tennō Shō (Autumn); Japan Cup; Arima Kinen	¥200 million for Japanese-bred horse; ¥100 million for non-Japanese bred horse
Horse completes the year's Autumn Triple Crown:	Tennō Shō (Autumn); Japan Cup; Arima Kinen	¥300 million for Japanese-bred horse; ¥150 million for non-Japanese bred horse

== Records ==
Leading horses:

- 2 – Gentildonna (2012, 2013)
- 2 – Almond Eye (2018, 2020)

Leading jockey:

- 5 – Yutaka Take: Special Week (1999), Deep Impact (2006), Rose Kingdom (2010), Kitasan Black (2016), Do Deuce (2024)

Leading trainers:

- 2 – Michael Stoute: Singspiel (1996), Pilsudski (1997)
- 2 – Hiroyoshi Matsuda: Admire Moon (2007), Buena Vista (2011)
- 2 – Katsuhiko Sumii: Vodka (2009), Epiphaneia (2014)
- 2 – Sei Ishizaka: Gentildonna (2012, 2013)
- 2 – Yasuo Tomomichi: Cheval Grand (2017), Do Deuce (2024)
- 2 – Sakae Kunieda: Almond Eye (2018, 2020)

Leading owner:

- 4 – Sunday Racing: Rose Kingdom (2010), Buena Vista (2011), Gentildonna (2012, 2013)

- Fastest winning time (at 2,400 m): Calandagan (2025); 2:20.3
- Slowest winning time (at 2,400 m): Symboli Rudolf (1985); 2:28.8
- Largest margin of victory: Nine lengths – Tap Dance City (2003)
- Shortest margin of victory: Nose – Marvelous Crown (1994), Singspiel (1996), Falbrav (2002), Alkaased (2005), Vodka (2009), Gentildonna (2012, 2013)
- Oldest winning horse: Jupiter Island (1986); aged 7
- Youngest winning horse: Half Iced (1982), Le Glorieux (1987), El Condor Pasa (1998), Jungle Pocket (2001), Rose Kingdom (2010), Gentildonna (2012), Almond Eye (2018); all aged 3
- Largest field: 18 runners (2003, 2005, 2007, 2009, 2010, 2014, 2015, 2021, 2022, 2023)
- Smallest field: 11 runners (2006)

== Winners ==
Individual race results and prize money derived from the Netkeiba, Racing Post and JRA weblinks listed under References.

Winners of the Japan Cup
Year	Winner _{(CB)}	Age	Jockey	Trainer	Owner	Time	Top 5 Purse
1981	Mairzy Doates (USA)	5	Cash Asmussen (USA)	John Fulton (USA)	Arno Schefler (USA)	2:25.3	¥123,500,000
1982	Half Iced (USA)	3	Don MacBeth (CAN)	Stanley M. Hough (USA)	Bertram R. Firestone (USA)	2:27.1	¥134,000,000
1983	Stanerra (IRE)	5	Brian Rouse (GB)	Frank Dunne (IRE)	Frank Dunne (IRE)	2:27.6	¥137,200,000
1984	Katsuragi Ace (JPN)	4	Katsuichi Nishiura (JPN)	Kazumi Domon (JPN)	Ichizo Node (JPN)	2:26.3	¥142,500,000
1985	Symboli Rudolf (JPN)	4	Yukio Okabe (JPN)	Yuji Nohira (JPN)	Symboli Bokujo (JPN)	2:28.8	¥148,800,000
1986	Jupiter Island (GB)	7	Pat Eddery (IRE)	Clive Brittain (GB)	Marquess of Tavistock (GB)	2:25.0	¥152,000,000
1987	Le Glorieux (GB)	3	Alain Lequeux (FRA)	Robert Collet (FRA)	Sieglinde Wolf (GER)	2:24.9	¥161,500,000
1988	Pay the Butler (USA)	4	Chris McCarron (USA)	Robert J. Frankel (USA)	Edmund A. Gann (USA)	2:25.5	¥180,500,000
1989	Horlicks (NZL)	6	Lance O'Sullivan (NZL)	Dave O'Sullivan (NZL)	Graham de Gruchy (NZL)	2:22.2	¥195,300,000
1990	Better Loosen Up (AUS)	5	Michael Clarke (AUS)	David Hayes (AUS)	Gabe Farrah, et al. (AUS)	2:23.2	¥210,000,000
1991	Golden Pheasant (USA)	5	Gary Stevens (USA)	Charles Whittingham (USA)	Bruce McNall (USA)^{[1]}	2:24.7	¥228,000,000
1992	Tokai Teio (JPN)	4	Yukio Okabe (JPN)	Shoichi Matsumoto (JPN)	Masanori Uchimura (JPN)	2:24.6	¥248,000,000
1993	Legacy World (JPN)	4	Hiroshi Kawachi (JPN)	Hideyuki Mori (JPN)	Horse Tajima Co. (JPN)	2:24.4	¥248,000,000
1994	Marvelous Crown (JPN)	4	Katsumi Minai (JPN)	Makoto Osawa (JPN)	Sadao Sasahara (JPN)	2:23.6	¥248,000,000
1995	Lando (GER)	5	Michael Roberts (SAF)	Heinz Jentzsch (GER)	Gestüt Haus Ittlingen (GER)	2:24.6	¥251,200,000
1996	Singspiel (IRE)	4	Frankie Dettori (ITA)	Michael Stoute (GB)	Sheikh Mohammed (UAE)	2:23.8	¥251,200,000
1997	Pilsudski (IRE)	5	Michael Kinane (IRE)	Michael Stoute (GB)	Lord Weinstock (GB)	2:25.8	¥251,200,000
1998	El Condor Pasa (USA)	3	Masayoshi Ebina (JPN)	Yoshitaka Ninomiya (JPN)	Takashi Watanabe (JPN)	2:25.9	¥251,200,000
1999	Special Week (JPN)	4	Yutaka Take (JPN)	Toshiaki Shirai (JPN)	Hiroyoshi Usuda (JPN)	2:25.5	¥251,200,000
2000	T. M. Opera O (JPN)	4	Ryuji Wada (JPN)	Ichizo Iwamoto (JPN)	Masatsugu Takezono (JPN)	2:26.1	¥476,000,000
2001	Jungle Pocket (JPN)	3	Olivier Peslier (FRA)	Sakae Watanabe (JPN)	Yomoji Saito (JPN)	2:23.8	¥476,000,000
2002	Falbrav (IRE)^{[2]}	4	Frankie Dettori (ITA)	Luciano d'Auria (ITA)	Scuderia Rencati (ITA)	2:12.2	¥476,000,000
2003	Tap Dance City (USA)	6	Tetsuzo Sato (JPN)	Shozo Sasaki (JPN)	Yushun Horse Syndicate (JPN)	2:28.7	¥476,000,000
2004	Zenno Rob Roy (JPN)	4	Olivier Peslier (FRA)	Kazuo Fujisawa (JPN)	Shinobu Oosako (JPN)	2:24.2	¥476,000,000
2005	Alkaased (USA)	5	Frankie Dettori (ITA)	Luca Cumani (GB)	Michael Charlton (GB)	2:22.1	¥476,000,000
2006	Deep Impact (JPN)	4	Yutaka Take (JPN)	Yasuo Ikee (JPN)	Kaneko Makoto Holdings Co. (JPN)	2:25.1	¥476,000,000
2007	Admire Moon (JPN)	4	Yasunari Iwata (JPN)	Hiroyoshi Matsuda (JPN)	Darley Japan Farm Co. Ltd. (JPN)	2:24.7	¥476,000,000
2008	Screen Hero (JPN)	4	Mirco Demuro (ITA)	Yuichi Shikato (JPN)	Teruya Yoshida (JPN)	2:25.5	¥476,000,000
2009	Vodka (JPN)	5	Christophe Lemaire (FRA)	Katsuhiko Sumii (JPN)	Yuzo Tanimizu (JPN)	2:22.4	¥481,520,000
2010	Rose Kingdom (JPN)^{[3]}	3	Yutaka Take (JPN)	Kojiro Hashiguchi (JPN)	Sunday Racing (JPN)	2:25.2	¥481,400,000
2011	Buena Vista (JPN)	5	Yasunari Iwata (JPN)	Hiroyoshi Matsuda (JPN)	Sunday Racing (JPN)	2:24.2	¥480,920,000
2012	Gentildonna (JPN)	3	Yasunari Iwata (JPN)	Sei Ishizaka (JPN)	Sunday Racing (JPN)	2:23.1	¥481,100,000
2013	Gentildonna (JPN)	4	Ryan Moore (GB)	Sei Ishizaka (JPN)	Sunday Racing (JPN)	2:26.1	¥481,400,000
2014	Epiphaneia (JPN)	4	Christophe Soumillon (BEL)	Katsuhiko Sumii (JPN)	U. Carrot Farm (JPN)	2:23.1	¥481,460,000
2015	Shonan Pandora (JPN)	4	Kenichi Ikezoe (JPN)	Tomokazu Takano (JPN)	Tetsuhide Kunimoto (JPN)	2:24.7	¥575,400,000
2016	Kitasan Black (JPN)	4	Yutaka Take (JPN)	Hisashi Shimizu (JPN)	Ōno Shoji (JPN)	2:25.8	¥575,340,000
2017	Cheval Grand (JPN)	5	Hugh Bowman (AUS)	Yasuo Tomomichi (JPN)	Kazuhiro Sasaki (JPN)	2:23.7	¥575,220,000
2018	Almond Eye (JPN)	3	Christophe Lemaire (FRA)	Sakae Kunieda (JPN)	Silk Racing (JPN)	2:20.6	¥577,344,000
2019	Suave Richard (JPN)	5	Oisin Murphy (IRE)	Yasushi Shono (JPN)	NICKS Co, Ltd (JPN)	2:25.9	¥574,560,000
2020	Almond Eye (JPN)	5	Christophe Lemaire (FRA)	Sakae Kunieda (JPN)	Silk Racing (JPN)	2:23.0	¥574,620,000
2021	Contrail (JPN)	4	Yuichi Fukunaga (JPN)	Yoshito Yahagi (JPN)	Shinji Maeda (JPN)	2:24.7	¥575,460,000
2022	Vela Azul (JPN)	5	Ryan Moore (GB)	Kunihiko Watanabe (JPN)	U. Carrot Farm (JPN)	2:23.7	¥765,580,000
2023	Equinox (JPN)	4	Christophe Lemaire (FRA)	Tetsuya Kimura (JPN)	Silk Racing (JPN)	2:21.8	¥960,520,000
2024	Do Deuce (JPN)	5	Yutaka Take (JPN)	Yasuo Tomomichi (JPN)	Kieffers Co. Ltd. (JPN)	2:25.5	¥959,260,000
2025	Calandagan (IRE)	4	Mickael Barzalona (FRA)	Francis-Henri Graffard (FRA)	Aga Khan Studs SCEA (FRA)	2:20.3	¥960,400,000

^{1} With Wayne Gretzky (CAN) as a minority stake holder.
^{2} The 2002 race took place at Nakayama Racecourse over a distance of 2,200 metres.
^{3} Rose Kingdom finished second to Buena Vista but was promoted as a result of a disqualification.

== Winners by nationality ==
Horse

Nation	Foaled	Trained	Owned
Australia (AUS)	1	1	1
France (FRA)	0	2	1
Germany (GER)	1	1	2
Great Britain (GB)	2	4	3
Ireland (IRE)	5	1	1
Italy (ITA)	0	1	1
Japan (JPN)	28	30	30
New Zealand (NZL)	1	1	1
United Arab Emirates (UAE)	0	0	1
United States (USA)	7	4	4

Jockey

Nation	No.
Australia (AUS)	2
Belgium (BEL)	1
Canada (CAN)	1
France (FRA)	8
Great Britain (GB)	3
Ireland (IRE)	3
Italy (ITA)	4
Japan (JPN)	18
New Zealand (NZL)	1
South Africa (SAF)	1
United States (USA)	3

== See also ==
- The Champions Cup – A Japanese Group 1 dirt race formerly known as the Japan Cup Dirt until 2013, which was previously held as an international invitational event.
- Horse racing in Japan
- List of Japanese flat horse races
