= Half Iced =

American-bred Thoroughbred racehorse

- Half Iced and Don MacBeth, in front of All Along and Gary Moore at the 1982 Japan Cup
- Sire: Hatchet Man
- Grandsire: The Axe
- Dam: Winter Memory
- Damsire: Olden Times
- Sex: Stallion
- Foaled: March 14, 1979
- Died: October 9, 2001 (aged 22); New Zealand
- Country: United States
- Colour: Brown
- Breeder: Mrs. Henry A. Gerry
- Owner: Bertram R. Firestone
- Racing colours
- Trainer: Stanley M. Hough
- Record: 32: 7-4-5
- Earnings: $639,608 (in North America)

Major wins
- Secretariat Stakes (1982); Knickerbocker Handicap (1982); Japan Cup (1982); Seneca Handicap (1983)

Half Iced (March 14, 1979 – October 9, 2001) was an American Thoroughbred racehorse who raced on turf and was best known for winning the 1982 Japan Cup. After being beaten in his two starts as a juvenile in 1981 he was highly tried in the next two seasons racing sixteen times in 1982 and thirteen times in 1983. As a three-year-old he won three minor races before recording his first major victory in the Grade II Secretariat Stakes. He ended his season by beating a top-class international field in the Japan Cup at Tokyo Racecourse. In the following year he won the Grade III Seneca Handicap at Saratoga Race Course and ended his racing career by finishing a close fourth in his second Japan Cup. He was retired to stud in New Zealand and had some success as a breeding stallion. He died in 2001 at the age of twenty two.

== Background ==
Half Iced was a dark bay or brown horse bred in Kentucky by Mrs. Henry A. Gerry. He was sired by Hatchet Man whose wins included the Dwyer Stakes, Widener Handicap and Amory L. Haskell Handicap. His dam, the Virginia-bred Winter Memory was a descendant of the influential American broodmare Valkyr.

During his racing career, Half Iced was owned by Bertram R. Firestone and trained by Stanley M. Hough.

== Racing career ==
=== 1981: two-year-old season ===
Half Iced made his racecourse debut when he finished sixth in a maiden race at Aqueduct Racetrack on December 20, 1981, and went on to finish eighth in a similar event at the same track eleven days later.

=== 1982: three-year-old season ===
Half Iced was highly tried as a three-year-old, racing sixteen times in ten months. At Aqueduct he finished third on his seasonal debut and then won a maiden race on March 1 before finishing second and third in two allowance races. He then moved to Belmont Park and competed in allowance races, winning once from four attempts before moving up in class and finishing fourth behind Majesty's Prince in the Grade II Lexington Stakes on August 1. Later that month he won an allowance race at Saratoga Race Course and was then stepped up again in class for the Grade II Secretariat Stakes at Arlington Park on September 6. Ridden by Don MacBeth he recorded his first major success as he won from Dew Line and Continuing. He was then switched to the dirt and finished seventh in the Super Derby at Louisiana Downs. Half Iced was returned to the turf and matched against older horses for the first time in the Grade I Man o' War Stakes at Belmont on October 3 and finished fourth behind Naskra's Breeze, Sprink and Thunder Puddles. Two weeks later he was sent to Woodbine Racetrack for the Rothmans International Stakes and finished fourth behind Maajesty's Prince, Jack Slade and the French-trained Esprit du Nord. On November 2 at Aqueduct, the colt contested one of two divisions of the Grade III Knickerbocker Handicap and won from No Neck and Erin's Tiger.

On his final appearance as a three-year-old, Half Iced was sent to Japan to contest the second running of the Japan Cup over 2400 metres in front of a 90,000 crowd at Tokyo Racecourse on November 28. The race attracted a strong international entry including John Henry (the favourite) from the United States, April Run (owned by Diana Firestone) and All Along from France, Stanerra from Ireland, Frost King from Canada, Isle of Man (New Zealand Derby) from New Zealand, Pageno from Germany and Scouting Miller from Italy. The best of the Japanese runners appeared to be Hikari Duel (runner-up in the autumn edition of the Tenno Sho), Sweet Native (Yasuda Kinen and Katsu R (Takarazuka Kinen). Ridden as usual by MacBeth Half Iced started a 31.3/1 outsider and won by a neck from All Along with April Run a further neck away in third ahead of Stanerra and Hikari Duel. MacBeth explained that he had "saved power for the last dash" whilst Bertram Firestone commented "I am happy my horse won the race and that my wife's horse was third".

=== 1983: four-year-old season ===
Half Iced recorded one win from thirteen starts as a four-year-old in 1983. In his first seven races his best efforts came when he finished second in the W L McKnight Handicap at Calder Race Course in January and was placed third in a Belmont allowance in June. In August he moved to Saratoga where he finished fourth in an allowance before contesting the Seneca Handicap over one mile five furlongs. He recorded his first win for nine months as took the Grade III contest from Nice Pirate and James Boswell. He went on to finish third to Acaroid in the Manhattan Handicap, eighth in the Man o' War Stakes and fourth in the Louisiana Downs Handicap. On his final North American appearance he finished unplaced behind All Along in the Rothmans International Stakes on October 16.

In November Half Iced returned to Tokyo to defend the Japan Cup. Ridden by Eddie Maple he finished fourth behind Stanerra, Kyoei Promise and Esprit du Nord, beaten less than a length by the winner.

== Stud record ==
Half Iced was retired from racing to become a breeding stallion in New Zealand, based at the Paramount Stud in Hastings. His best winners included Sky Flyer (Brisbane Cup) and Ed (Wellington Cup). Half Iced died in New Zealand on October 9, 2001.

== Pedigree ==
Pedigree of Half Iced (USA), brown stallion 1979
Sire Hatchet Man (USA) 1971	The Axe (USA); 1958	Mahmoud	Blenheim
Sire Hatchet Man (USA) 1971	The Axe (USA); 1958	Mahmoud	Mah Mahal
Sire Hatchet Man (USA) 1971	The Axe (USA); 1958	Blackball	Shut Out
Sire Hatchet Man (USA) 1971	The Axe (USA); 1958	Blackball	Big Event
Sire Hatchet Man (USA) 1971	Bebopper (USA); 1962	Tom Fool	Menow
Sire Hatchet Man (USA) 1971	Bebopper (USA); 1962	Tom Fool	Gaga
Sire Hatchet Man (USA) 1971	Bebopper (USA); 1962	Bebop	Prince Bio
Sire Hatchet Man (USA) 1971	Bebopper (USA); 1962	Bebop	Cappellina
Dam Winter Memory (USA) 1972	Olden Times (USA); 1958	Relic	War Relic
Dam Winter Memory (USA) 1972	Olden Times (USA); 1958	Relic	Bridal Colors
Dam Winter Memory (USA) 1972	Olden Times (USA); 1958	Djenne	Djebel
Dam Winter Memory (USA) 1972	Olden Times (USA); 1958	Djenne	Teza
Dam Winter Memory (USA) 1972	Clear and Cold (CAN); 1965	Nearctic	Nearco
Dam Winter Memory (USA) 1972	Clear and Cold (CAN); 1965	Nearctic	Lady Angela
Dam Winter Memory (USA) 1972	Clear and Cold (CAN); 1965	Vase	Native Dancer
Dam Winter Memory (USA) 1972	Clear and Cold (CAN); 1965	Vase	Vashti (Family 13-c)
