= Stanerra =

Irish-bred Thoroughbred racehorse

- Sire: Guillaume Tell
- Grandsire: Nashua
- Dam: Lady Aureola
- Damsire: Aureole
- Sex: Mare
- Foaled: 4 May 1978
- Country: Ireland
- Colour: Chestnut
- Breeder: Moyglare Stud
- Owner: Frank Dunne
- Trainer: Jim Bolger; Frank Dunne
- Record: 24: 7-2-3

Major wins
- Brigadier Gerard Stakes (1983); Prince of Wales's Stakes (1983); Hardwicke Stakes (1983); Joe McGrath Memorial Stakes (1983); Japan Cup (1983)

Awards
- Timeform rating: 118 (1982), 128 (1983)

Stanerra (foaled 4 May 1978) was an Irish Thoroughbred racehorse and broodmare. Unraced at two, she ran twice a three-year-old before showing improved form in 1982 when she won one race and was placed in several good middle-distance races including behind the brilliant Derby winner, Golden Fleece. She reached her peak as a five-year-old in 1983 when she emerged as one of the leading middle-distance performers in Europe. After winning Brigadier Gerard Stakes in spring she showed outstanding form at Royal Ascot, winning the Prince of Wales's Stakes and then breaking the track record when taking the Hardwicke Stakes. In autumn she won the Joe McGrath Memorial Stakes in Ireland before becoming the first horse trained in Europe to win the Japan Cup. She was retired to stud after one unsuccessful run in 1984 but had no impact as a broodmare.

== Background ==
Stanerra was a rangy chestnut mare with a small white star and white socks on her hind legs bred in Ireland by the Moyglare Stud. She was the best horse sired by Guillaume Tell, an American-bred horse who won the Gordon Stakes in 1975 before his career was ended by injury.

In 1979, the filly was sent to the sales where she was bought for 5,000 Irish guineas and sent into training with Jim Bolger. Stanerra was given plenty of time to mature and was not ridden until she was three years old. In 1982 she was bought by Frank Dunne of Dunnes Stores who took out a training license and trained his own horses from 1982.

== Racing career ==
=== 1981/1982: early career ===
Stanerra was unraced as a two-year-old and raced twice as a three-year-old in 1981, winning one race over ten furlongs. In the following year she was very highly tried, running thirteen times and winning only once, when taking a handicap race over ten furlongs at the Curragh in May by four lengths. Throughout the rest of the season her form steadily improved as was evidenced by several good performances in defeat. At Royal Ascot in June she finished third behind the British colts Critique and Glint of Gold in the Hardwicke Stakes over one and a half miles. Later that year she again ran well in the United Kingdom when finishing second to the outstanding three-year-old filly Time Charter in the Sun Chariot Stakes over ten furlongs at Newmarket Racecourse. On her final appearance of 1982 she was sent to Japan to represent Ireland in the second running of the Japan Cup. She ran the best race of her career up to that time as she was beaten one and a half lengths, finishing fourth behind Half Iced, All Along and April Run.

=== 1983: five-year-old season ===
Stanerra began her five-year-old season by finishing unplaced behind the British colt Ivano in the Earl of Sefton Stakes at Newmarket Racecourse in April, a performance which suggested that she had made no improvement and may have deteriorated from the previous season. From this point on she made rapid progress. At Sandown Park Racecourse in May, starting as a 20/1 outsider, she recorded her first important win as she defeated Ivano by a length in the Group Three Brigadier Gerard Stakes. In this race she was ridden for the first time by Brian Rouse who became her regular jockey.

On 14 June on the opening day of the Royal Ascot meeting, Stanerra started at odds of 7/1 for the ten-furlong Prince of Wales's Stakes, which was then a Group Two race. Appearing to relish the firm ground, she produced what Timeform described as "a spectacular performance", moving up on the inside rail to take the lead inside the last quarter mile and winning very easily by four lengths from the favourite Sabre Dance. Three days later, Stanerra contested the Hardwicke Stakes over two furlongs further at the same course. She moved into the lead on the turn into the straight and quickly went clear to win by one and a half lengths from Electric, with the Coronation Cup winner Be My Native twelve lengths further back in third. The winning time of 2:26.95 broke the track record established by Grundy in the 1975 King George VI and Queen Elizabeth Stakes. Two weeks after her successes at Ascot, Stanerra started 11/4 favourite for the Eclipse Stakes at Sandown, but Rouse was unable to obtain a clear run in the straight and the mare finished fourth to Solford in a slowly run race.

Stanerra' only run in her own country came in September, when she ran in the Joe McGrath Memorial Stakes at Leopardstown Racecourse, which was then the only Group One race in Ireland open to older horses. Despite rumours that she was less than fully fit, she took the lead a furlong and a half from the finish and won by two and a half lengths from the Irish 2,000 Guineas winner Wassl. In October, the mare was sent to France for the first time and started fourth favourite in a field of twenty-six runners for the Prix de l'Arc de Triomphe. She recovered from a slow start to reach second place in the straight but could make no further progress and eventually finished six in a bunched finish, less than two lengths behind the winner All Along. Plans to race the mare in North America were aborted following training problems, but she returned to fitness in time to contest the third running of the Japan Cup, which took place before a crowd of 80,000 at Tokyo Racecourse on 27 November. The race attracted a field of sixteen, including challengers from the United Kingdom, Italy, Germany, the United States and New Zealand while the "home team" was headed by the Arima Kinen winner Amber Shadai and the Tenno Sho winners Kyoei Promise and Mejiro Titan. Stanerra did not recover well from her flight, and after her arrival in Japan she was kept in condition with six hours' walking exercise a day. Racing on her favoured firm ground, Stanerra was not among the early leaders but produced a strong late run to take the lead in the closing strides and won by a head from Kyoei Promise. She was the first European-trained winner of the race.

Stanerra remained in training in 1984, but had several training setbacks and appeared only once, when finishing last of the five runners in the Nassau Stakes.

== Assessment ==
In 1982, Stanerra was given a rating of 118 by the independent Timeform organisation and was rated the best older female in Ireland in the Irish Free Handicap. In the following year, Timeform gave her a rating of 128, eight pounds behind the top-rated horse Habibti. In the official International Classification she was rated the third-best older female in Europe behind All Along and Time Charter.

== Breeding record ==
Stanerra produced at least six foals between 1986 and 2001, none of whom made any impact as racehorses:

- Stanerra's Song, a filly, foaled in 1986, sired by Seattle Song
- Stanerra's Star, bay filly, foaled in 1987, sired by Shadeed, unplaced in her only race
- Stanerra's Wish, bay filly, foaled in 1989, sired by Caerleon, fourth in her only race
- Stan's Hope, filly, foaled in 1990, sired by Glow, failed to win in four races
- Sandrine, chestnut filly, foaled in 1992, sired by Caerleon, failed to win in nine races
- Stanerra's Story, colt, foaled in 2001, sired by Desert Story, won one race after being gelded

== Pedigree ==
Pedigree of Stanerra, chestnut mare, 1978
Sire Guillaume Tell (USA) 1968	Nashua (USA); 1952	Nasrullah	Nearco
Sire Guillaume Tell (USA) 1968	Nashua (USA); 1952	Nasrullah	Mumtaz Begum
Sire Guillaume Tell (USA) 1968	Nashua (USA); 1952	Segula	Johnstown
Sire Guillaume Tell (USA) 1968	Nashua (USA); 1952	Segula	Sekhmet
Sire Guillaume Tell (USA) 1968	La Dauphine (USA); 1957	Princequillo	Prince Rose
Sire Guillaume Tell (USA) 1968	La Dauphine (USA); 1957	Princequillo	Cosquilla
Sire Guillaume Tell (USA) 1968	La Dauphine (USA); 1957	Baby League	Bubbling Over
Sire Guillaume Tell (USA) 1968	La Dauphine (USA); 1957	Baby League	La Troienne
Dam Lady Aureloa (IRE) 1964	Aureole (GB); 1950	Hyperion	Gainsborough
Dam Lady Aureloa (IRE) 1964	Aureole (GB); 1950	Hyperion	Selene
Dam Lady Aureloa (IRE) 1964	Aureole (GB); 1950	Angelola	Donatello
Dam Lady Aureloa (IRE) 1964	Aureole (GB); 1950	Angelola	Feola
Dam Lady Aureloa (IRE) 1964	Lady Godiva (FR); 1948	Royal Charger	Nearco
Dam Lady Aureloa (IRE) 1964	Lady Godiva (FR); 1948	Royal Charger	Sun Princess
Dam Lady Aureloa (IRE) 1964	Lady Godiva (FR); 1948	Princess Toi	Scarlet Tiger
Dam Lady Aureloa (IRE) 1964	Lady Godiva (FR); 1948	Princess Toi	Primtoi (Family:7-e)
