= Don MacBeth =

Canadian-American jockey

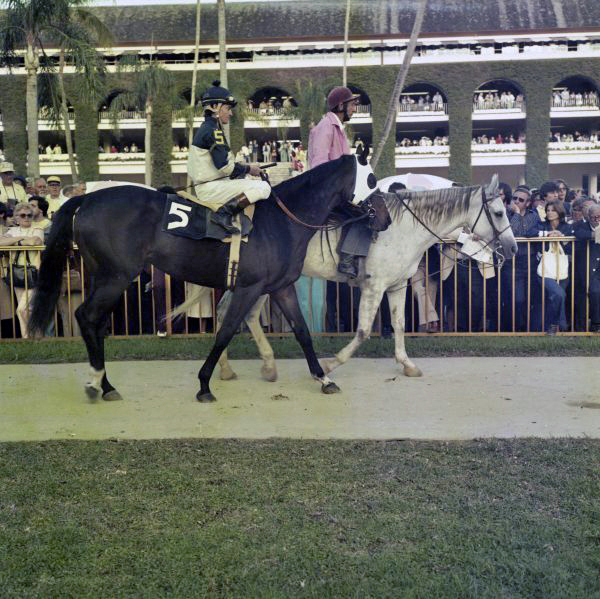
- MacBeth with "Coverack" at Hialeah, pictured 25 February 1978

Personal information
- Born: August 29, 1949 Red Deer, Alberta, Canada
- Died: March 1, 1987 (age 37)
- Occupation: Jockey

Horse racing career
- Sport: Horse racing
- Career wins: 2,764

Major racing wins
- Royal Palm Handicap (1973, 1983); Black Helen Handicap (1974); Lamplighter Handicap (1974, 1977, 1978, 1979); Massachusetts Handicap (1974); Autumn Handicap (1977); Columbiana Handicap (1977); Dominion Day Stakes (1977); Jockey Club Cup Handicap (1978); Salvator Mile Handicap (1979); Vagrancy Handicap (1979); Dwyer Stakes (1980); Bahamas Stakes (1981); Comely Stakes (1981); Firenze Handicap (1981); Laurel Futurity (1981); Suburban Handicap (1981, 1982, 1985); Bertram F. Bongard Stakes (1982, 1984); Ladies Handicap (1982); Secretariat Stakes (1982); Whitney Handicap (1982); Astoria Stakes (1983); Donn Handicap (1983); Gulfstream Park Sprint Championship (1983); Juvenile Stakes (1983); Cowdin Stakes (1984); Damon Runyon Stakes (1984); Frizette Stakes (1984); Gotham Stakes (1984); Hill Prince Stakes (1984, 1985); Hopeful Stakes (1984, 1985); Jerome Handicap (1984); Saratoga Special Stakes (1984); Blue Grass Stakes (1985); Flamingo Stakes (1985); Jamaica Handicap (1985); Lawrence Realization Stakes (1985); Marlboro Cup Invitational Handicap (1985); Matron Stakes (1985); Metropolitan Handicap (1985); Spinaway Stakes (1985); Widener Handicap (1985); Washington, D.C. International (1985); Breeders' Cup wins: Breeders' Cup Juvenile (1984) International race wins: Japan Cup (1982)

Racing awards
- Avelino Gomez Memorial Award (1987); George Woolf Memorial Jockey Award (1987); Monmouth Park Champion Jockey (1978, 1979, 1980)

Honours
- Canadian Horse Racing Hall of Fame (1988); Don MacBeth Memorial Jockey Fund

Significant horses
- Temperence Hill, Deputy Minister, Half Iced, Pine Circle, Vanlandingham, Chief's Crown
- Updated on March 28, 2007

Donald MacBeth (August 29, 1949 – March 1, 1987) was a Canadian Hall of Fame jockey in North American Thoroughbred racing.

Born in Red Deer, Alberta, Macbeth rode horses at Alberta racetracks before going to race in the United States. Among horses of note, he rode Deputy Minister, winner of the 1981 Sovereign and Eclipse awards for Outstanding Two-Year-Old Male Horse in Canada and the United States. In Japan, MacBeth rode Half Iced to victory in the 1982 Japan Cup and Chief's Crown to a win in the 1984 Breeders' Cup Juvenile, the 1985 Blue Grass Stakes, and the 1985 Marlboro Cup. He also won the prestigious Washington, D.C. International in 1985 aboard Vanlandingham for trainer Shug McGaughey.

A 1991 Southern Florida Sun-Sentinel newspaper story referred to MacBeth as being "among the most respected of jockeys, known well for his gentle nature and integrity."

MacBeth was the leading jockey at Monmouth Park for three years running between 1978 and 1980. He won 2,764 races before cancer ended his racing career. For his significant contribution to the sport of horse racing, MacBeth received the Avelino Gomez Memorial Award and the George Woolf Memorial Jockey Award. MacBeth died of cancer in Reddick, Florida, where he lived, on March 1, 1987. The following year he was inducted posthumously into the Canadian Horse Racing Hall of Fame.

== MacBeth Memorial Jockey Fund ==
After doing a show at a racetrack near Minneapolis, Minnesota, devoted fan and sometime racehorse owner, comedy actor Tim Conway had wanted to donate his fee to help former jockeys experiencing hard times, but learned that no such fund existed. In cooperation with Don MacBeth's widow, Conway became a co-founder, president, and member of the board of directors of the Don MacBeth Memorial Jockey Fund to assist injured and disabled riders. When it ceased operations at the end of 2011, the Fund had assisted more than 2,000 riders.
