= All Along =

French-bred Thoroughbred racehorse (1979–2005)

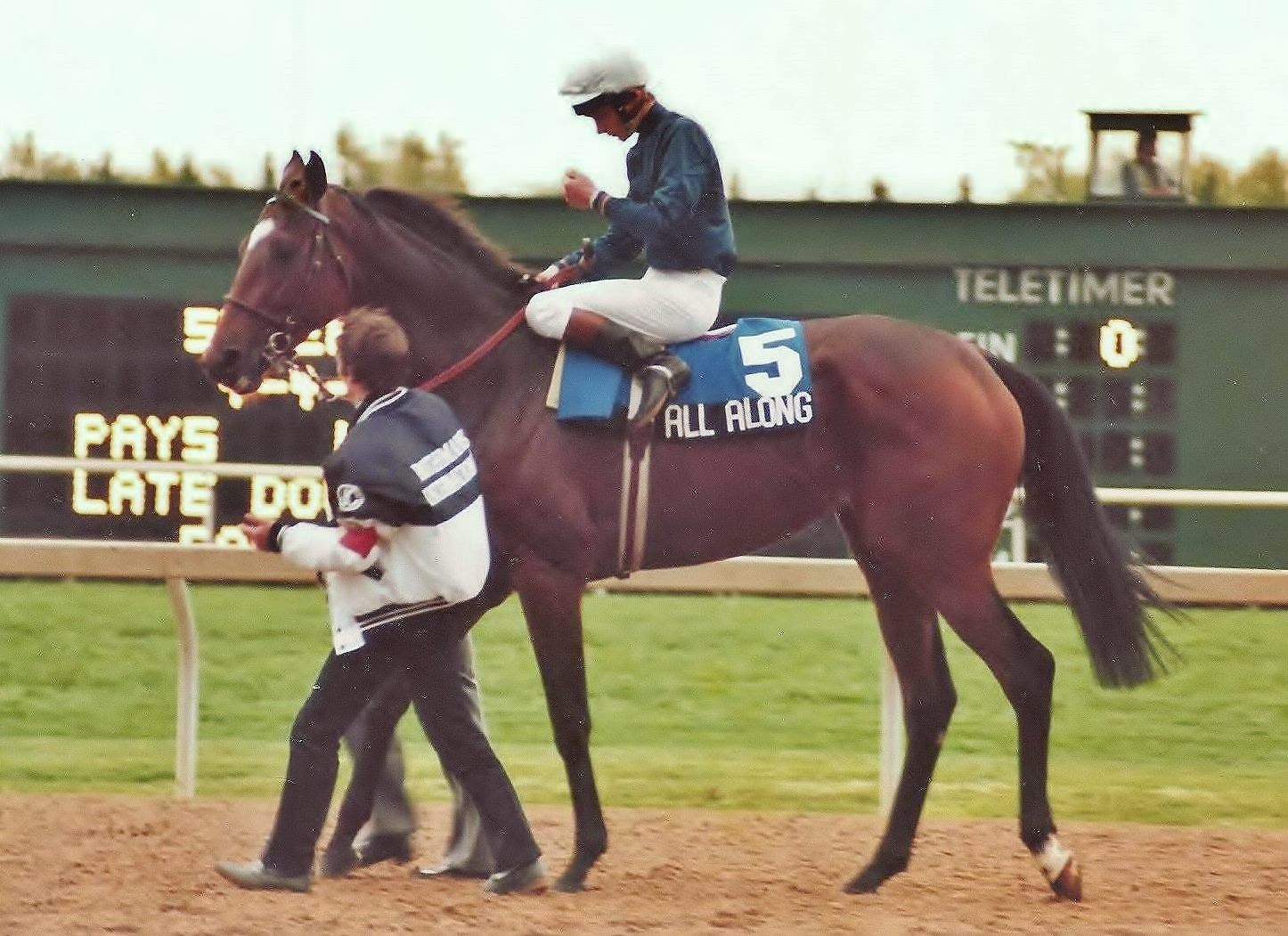
- All Along with jockey Walter Swinburn
- Sire: Targowice
- Grandsire: Round Table
- Dam: Agujita
- Damsire: Vieux Manoir
- Sex: Mare
- Foaled: 1979
- Country: France
- Colour: Bay
- Breeder: Daniel Wildenstein
- Owner: Daniel Wildenstein. Racing colors: Dark blue, light blue cap.
- Trainer: Patrick Biancone
- Record: 21: 9-4-2
- Earnings: $3,018,420

Major wins
- Prix Penelope (1982); Prix Maurice de Nieuil (1982); Prix Vermeille (1982); Prix de l'Arc de Triomphe (1983); Turf Classic (1983); Rothmans International (1983); Washington, D.C. International (1983); Timeform rating: 134

Awards
- American Champion Female Turf Horse (1983); American Horse of the Year (1983)

Honours
- United States Racing Hall of Fame (1990) #68 - Top 100 U.S. Racehorses of the 20th Century; All Along Stakes at Colonial Downs
- Last updated on 23 July 2024

All Along (7 April 1979 – 23 February 2005) was a champion Thoroughbred mare that was foaled and trained in France. She was one of the top European fillies since World War II. While she mostly raced in Europe, the filly also won top-level races in North America. She was named into the National Museum of Racing and Hall of Fame in 1990 and the Canadian Horse Racing Hall of Fame in 2019. All Along was less successful as a broodmare, her only winning offspring being the Mill Reef-sired colt Along All who won the Prix Greffulhe in 1989.

== Background ==
A granddaughter of Round Table, she was owned by Daniel Wildenstein (1917–2001), the French art dealer. All Along was trained in France, first by Maurice Zilber (1981) and for the remainder of her career by Patrick-Louis Biancone.

== Racing career ==
=== 1981 and 1982: Two-year-old and three-year-old season ===
All Along, ridden by Gary Moore, at the 1982 Japan Cup

As a two-year-old, the filly raced only one time and won. The following year, she competed on turf courses in France, England and Japan, winning numerous prestigious races. She ran at the second running of the Japan Cup, losing to Half Iced by a neck.

=== 1983: Four-year-old season ===
In 1983 All Along finished third to Zalataia in the Grand Prix de Chantilly but then finished seventh of the nine runners when favourite for the Grand Prix de Saint-Cloud. After a summer break she returned for the Prix Foy at Longchamp Racecourse. Biancone decided to change the tactics used on the filly and instructed her jockey to hold up the filly for a late run. She made up a great deal of ground in the closing stages to finish second, a length behind the British-trained filly Time Charter.

Ridden by jockey Walter Swinburn, All Along started at odds of 17.3/1 France's most famous race, the Prix de l'Arc de Triomphe. She was held up until the straight when she was produced with a strong run along the rail, catching the leader Sun Princess in the last 100 metres and winning by a length. Luth Enchantee beat Time Charter in a photograph for third, meaning that fillies filled the first four places. She was immediately shipped to Toronto, Ontario, Canada and won the Rothmans International at Woodbine Racetrack. Two weeks later, she won the Turf Classic at Aqueduct Racetrack in Jamaica, New York by 8¾ lengths, then won the Washington, D.C. International Stakes at Laurel, Maryland. Four consecutive wins against the best horses in the world all occurred within 41 days. She was the first horse to win the three prestigious North American races in a row, netting a million-dollar bonus for her owners and Horse of the Year honors in both France and the United States.

She was voted the Eclipse Award for Outstanding Female Turf Horse and became the first filly to win the Eclipse Award for Horse of the Year since the voting system had been implemented in the 1970s.

=== 1984: Five-year-old season ===
In 1984, she competed in only four races, including a close second in the inaugural Breeders' Cup Turf.

== Stud record ==
All Along retired as a broodmare to the Three Chimneys Farm in Midway, Kentucky. She was the dam of:

- 1998 bay filly, Armure Royale by Woodman
- 1993 filly, Arutua by Riverman
- 1988 filly, All Dancing by Dancing Brave

She died in 2005 and was buried in the cemetery at the Old Bradley Place division of Three Chimneys Farm.

== Assessment ==
All Along was inducted in the National Museum of Racing and Hall of Fame in 1990 and the Canadian Horse Racing Hall of Fame in 2019. In the Blood-Horse magazine ranking of the top 100 U.S. Thoroughbred champions of the 20th Century, All Along was ranked #68.

Pedigree of All Along (FR), bay mare, 1979
Sire Targowice (USA) 1970	Round Table	Princequillo	Prince Rose
Sire Targowice (USA) 1970	Round Table	Princequillo	Cosquilla
Sire Targowice (USA) 1970	Round Table	Knight's Daughter (GB)	Sir Cosmo
Sire Targowice (USA) 1970	Round Table	Knight's Daughter (GB)	Feola
Sire Targowice (USA) 1970	Matriarch (USA); 1964	Bold Ruler	Nasrullah
Sire Targowice (USA) 1970	Matriarch (USA); 1964	Bold Ruler	Miss Disco
Sire Targowice (USA) 1970	Matriarch (USA); 1964	Lyceum	Bull Lea
Sire Targowice (USA) 1970	Matriarch (USA); 1964	Lyceum	Colosseum
Dam Agujita (FR) 1966	Vieux Manoir	Brantome	Blandford
Dam Agujita (FR) 1966	Vieux Manoir	Brantome	Vitamone
Dam Agujita (FR) 1966	Vieux Manoir	Vieille Maison	Finglas
Dam Agujita (FR) 1966	Vieux Manoir	Vieille Maison	Vieille Canaille
Dam Agujita (FR) 1966	Argosy	Coastal Traffic (GB)	Hyperion
Dam Agujita (FR) 1966	Argosy	Coastal Traffic (GB)	Rose of England
Dam Agujita (FR) 1966	Argosy	Prosodie	Prince Rose
Dam Agujita (FR) 1966	Argosy	Prosodie	Protein (Family: 1D)

- All Along was inbred 4 × 4 to the stallion Prince Rose, meaning that the latter appears twice in the fourth generation of her pedigree.
