= Bertram and Diana Firestone =

American racehorse breeders

Bertram Robert Firestone (August 18, 1931 – July 12, 2021) and Diana Melville Johnson Firestone (January 26, 1932 – February 12, 2023) of Newstead Farm in Upperville, Virginia were major owner/breeders of Thoroughbred equestrian and flat racing horses. They were voted the 1980 Eclipse Award for Outstanding Owner and in 1982 were inducted in the Virginia Thoroughbred Association Hall of Fame. They are former owners of Calder Race Course and Gulfstream Park in Florida. Their Genuine Risk was known for winning the 1980 Kentucky Derby.

== Early life ==
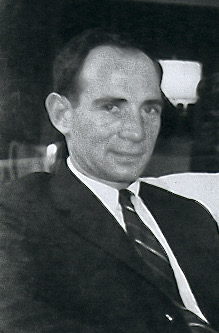
Bertram Firestone, ca. 1963.

Bertram Firestone was a highly successful industrial real estate developer. Diana Johnson is the daughter of John Seward Johnson I and Ruth Dill. One of the couple's six children, her paternal grandfather, Robert Wood Johnson I, was the founder of the health-related products manufacturer, Johnson & Johnson. Her maternal grandfather, Colonel Thomas Melville Dill, was a prominent Bermudian soldier, lawyer and politician.

== Thoroughbred racing ==
The Firestones raced horses in the United States and in Europe. Bertram Firestone bought the thoroughbred Ridin' Easy in 1966 from a Keeneland sale for $15,000 and in 1969 won the Fashion Stakes at Aqueduct Racetrack and the Polly Drummond Stakes at the Delaware Park Racetrack.

Bertram bought the colt King's Company for 35,000 guineas, that won the Irish 2,000 Guineas Turf Classic in May 1971 at the Curragh Racecourse. The horse went on to win the Cork and Orrery Stakes at the Royal Ascot in 1972.

Bertram bought the Catoctin Stud farm in Waterford, Virginia, in 1973. In 1991, he and Diana acquired the Newstead Farm in Upperville, Virginia. For racing in Europe, they operated the 1,200 acre Gilltown Stud farm in Kilcullen, County Kildare, Ireland near the famous Curragh, which they sold in 1989 to the Aga Khan IV for $14.2 million.

Among their many successes in Thoroughbred racing, in 1980, their Hall of Fame inductee Genuine Risk became only the second filly to ever win the Kentucky Derby.

They also bred and raced Secretariat's son, General Assembly, whose Saratoga track record time in winning the 1979 Travers Stakes stood until 2016. Trained by Dermot Weld, the Firestones' Blue Wind won the 1981 Epsom Oaks and Flash of Steel won the 1986 Irish 2000 Guineas. In November 1982, they won the Japan Cup with 3-year-old colt Half Iced. They were the breeders of Vintage Crop that won Australia's Melbourne Cup in 1993.

In 1983, they were honored by the Keeneland Association with its Mark of Distinction for their contribution to Keeneland and the Thoroughbred industry.

== Marriage and children ==
Bertram married Diana in 1973. They were each previously divorced with three children by a previous marriage. Firestone had been married twice before his marriage to Diana, to Lynn Belnap in 1955 and to Dariel Henderson in 1962.

Bertram died July 12, 2021, in West Palm Beach, Florida after deterioration of his health. Diana died on February 12, 2023, in West Palm Beach at the age of 91.
