= Deutsches St. Leger =

- Class: Group 3
- Location: Dortmund Racecourse; Dortmund, Germany
- Inaugurated: 1881
- Race type: Flat / Thoroughbred
- Sponsor: DSW21
- Website: Dortmund

Race information
- Distance: 2,800 metres (1¾ miles)
- Surface: Turf
- Track: Right-handed
- Qualification: Three-years-old and up
- Weight: 55½ kg (3yo); 60 kg (4yo+); Allowances; 1½ kg for fillies and mares
- Purse: €50,000 (2021); 1st: €30,000

The Deutsches St. Leger is a Group 3 flat horse race in Germany open to thoroughbreds aged three years or older. It is run at Dortmund over a distance of 2,800 metres (about 1¾ miles), and it is scheduled to take place each year in September or October.

It is Germany's equivalent of the St. Leger Stakes, a famous race in England.

== History ==
The event was established in 1881, and it was originally restricted to three-year-olds. It was staged at Hanover until 1908, and for a period it was called the Norddeutsches Saint Leger. It was transferred to Grunewald in 1909, and to Hoppegarten in 1934.

The race became known as the Lehndorff-Rennen in 1940. It was cancelled in 1945 and 1946, and held at Dortmund in 1947. It took place at Düsseldorf in 1948 and 1949, and on the latter occasion it was renamed the Deutsches St. Leger. It began its current spell at Dortmund in 1950.

The present system of race grading was introduced in Germany in 1972, and the Deutsches St. Leger was initially given Group 2 status. The first winner to complete a Triple Crown (having previously won the Henckel-Rennen and the Deutsches Derby) was Königsstuhl in 1979.

The Deutsches St. Leger was relegated to Group 3 level in 2005, and opened to older horses in 2007.

== Records ==
Most successful horse (2 wins):

- El Tango – 2005, 2007
- Lordano - 2023, 2026

Leading jockey (6 wins):

- Charles Ballantine – Pumpernickel (1887), Glöcknerin (1890), Wahlstatt (1893), Waschfrau (1895), Vollmond (1898), Rachenputzer (1900)
- Otto Schmidt – Ossian (1921), Ganelon (1923), Lampos (1926), Eisenkanzler (1927), Gregor (1930), Octavianus (1939)
- Gerhard Streit – Marschall Vorwärts (1938), Samurai (1940), Yngola (1944), Masetto (1955), Baalim (1961), Marinus (1964)

Leading trainer (11 wins):

- George Arnull – Abgott (1922), Weissdorn (1925), Wolkenflug (1931), Blinzen (1934), Marschall Vorwärts (1938), Octavianus (1939), Samurai (1940), Yngola (1944), Aubergine (1949), Asterios (1950), Jonkheer (1951)

== Winners since 1970 ==
| Year | Winner | Age | Jockey | Trainer | Time |
|---|---|---|---|---|---|
| 1970 | Lombard | 3 | Fritz Drechsler | Heinz Jentzsch | 3:01.60 |
| 1971 | Madruzzo | 3 | John Gorton | Arthur-Paul Schlaefke | 3:07.00 |
| 1972 | Arratos | 3 | Horst Horwart | Heinz Jentzsch | 3:19.50 |
| 1973 | Tannenberg | 3 | Geoff Lewis | Heinz Gummelt | 3:05.30 |
| 1974 | Marduk | 3 | Peter Remmert | Hein Bollow | 3:08.20 |
| 1975 | Windwurf | 3 | Jerzy Jednaszewski | Heinz Gummelt | 3:00.30 |
| 1976 | Stuyvesant | 3 | Joan Pall | Heinz Jentzsch | 3:00.40 |
| 1977 | La Tour | 3 | Peter Alafi | Sven von Mitzlaff | 2:57.00 |
| 1978 | Donat | 3 | Georg Bocskai | Bruno Schütz | 3:02.80 |
| 1979 | Königsstuhl | 3 | Peter Alafi | Sven von Mitzlaff | 3:01.20 |
| 1980 | Wauthi | 3 | Peter Remmert | Theo Grieper | 3:03.40 |
| 1981 | Index | 3 | Ralf Suerland | Heinz Jentzsch | 3:05.10 |
| 1982 | Anno | 3 | Georg Bocskai | Heinz Jentzsch | 2:59.10 |
| 1983 | Ordos | 3 | Peter Alafi | Sven von Mitzlaff | 2:58.20 |
| 1984 | Las Vegas | 3 | Peter Alafi | Sven von Mitzlaff | 3:13.10 |
| 1985 | Kamiros ^{[a]} | 3 | Peter Alafi | Sven von Mitzlaff | 3:02.20 |
| 1986 | Prairie Neba | 3 | Billy Newnes | Uwe Ostmann | 2:55.90 |
| 1987 | Gondola | 3 | Peter Remmert | Hein Bollow | 3:02.40 |
| 1988 | Britannia | 3 | Lutz Mäder | Bruno Schütz | 3:02.40 |
| 1989 | Klassiker | 3 | Manfred Hofer | Bruno Schütz | 3:07.80 |
| 1990 | Elsurimo | 3 | Andrzej Tylicki | Bruno Schütz | 3:10.50 |
| 1991 | All Top | 3 | Mark Rimmer | Bruno Schütz | 3:01.70 |
| 1992 | Non Partisan | 3 | Paul Eddery | André Fabre | 2:55.60 |
| 1993 | Pinot | 3 | Andre Best | Bruno Schütz | 3:12.90 |
| 1994 | Caballo | 3 | Andrzej Tylicki | Heinz Jentzsch | 3:02.40 |
| 1995 | First Hello | 3 | Torsten Mundry | Peter Rau | 3:05.50 |
| 1996 | Wurftaube | 3 | Kevin Woodburn | Harro Remmert | 3:02.30 |
| 1997 | Ungaro | 3 | Terence Hellier | Hans Blume | 2:53.00 |
| 1998 | Laveron | 3 | Torsten Mundry | Peter Rau | 3:07.11 |
| 1999 | Win for Us | 3 | Piotr Piatkowski | Peter Schiergen | 3:14.11 |
| 2000 | Moonlady | 3 | Kevin Woodburn | Harro Remmert | 3:19.29 |
| 2001 | Fair Question | 3 | Davy Bonilla | John Dunlop | 3:07.40 |
| 2002 | Liquido | 3 | Andreas Helfenbein | Horst Steinmetz | 3:03.54 |
| 2003 | Royal Fantasy | 3 | L. Hammer-Hansen | Horst Steinmetz | 3:08.61 |
| 2004 | Darsalam | 3 | Filip Minarik | Arslangirej Savujev | 3:04.01 |
| 2005 | El Tango | 3 | William Mongil | Peter Schiergen | 3:02.72 |
| 2006 | Schiaparelli | 3 | Andrasch Starke | Peter Schiergen | 3:03.43 |
| 2007 | El Tango | 5 | Andrasch Starke | Peter Schiergen | 3:10.14 |
| 2008 | Valdino | 3 | Terence Hellier | Uwe Ostmann | 3:09.06 |
| 2009 | Sassoaloro | 5 | Terence Hellier | Hans Blume | 3:02.73 |
| 2010 | Val Mondo | 3 | Andreas Helfenbein | Uwe Ostmann | 3:04.53 |
| 2011 | Fox Hunt | 4 | Silvestre de Sousa | Mark Johnston | 3:10.26 |
| 2012 | Altano | 6 | Eduardo Pedroza | Andreas Wöhler | 3:01.14 |
| 2013 | Hey Little Gorl | 3 | Andreas Helfenbein | Markus Klug | 3:02.88 |
| 2014 | Kaldera | 3 | Eddy Hardouin | Paul Harley | 3:11.88 |
| 2015 | Virginia Sun | 4 | Adrie de Vries | Jens Hirschberger | 3:13,8 |
| 2016 | Near England | 3 | Andreas Helfenbein | Markus Klug | 2:56,9 |
| 2017 | Oriental Eagle | 3 | Jack Mitchell | Jens Hirschberger | 3:07,5 |
| 2018 | Sweet Thomas | 6 | Stephen Hellyn | Andreas Suborics | 2:56.62 |
| 2019 | Ispolini | 4 | James Doyle | Charlie Appleby | 2:57.08 |
| 2020 | Quian | 4 | Lukas Delozier | Peter Schiergen | 2:55.95 |
| 2021 | Aff Un Zo | 3 | Adrie de Vries | Markus Klug | 2:58.39 |
| 2022 | Tunnes | 3 | Bauyrzhan Murzabayev | Peter Schiergen | 3:06.21 |
| 2023 | Lordano | 4 | Rene Piechulek | Marcel Weiss | 2:59.92 |
| 2024 | Prydwen | 6 | Callum Shepherd | George Scott | 3:02.45 |
| 2025 | Caballo De Mar | 4 | Adrie de Vries | George Scott | 3:06.01 |
| 2026 | Lordano | 7 | Sibylle Vogt | Marcel Weiss | 3:01.62 |

^{a} Cassis finished first in 1985, but he was relegated to second place following a stewards' inquiry.

== Earlier winners ==
- 1881: Blue Monkey
- 1882: Marie
- 1883: Maria
- 1884: Vinea
- 1885: Picollos
- 1886: Antagonist
- 1887: Pumpernickel
- 1888: Padischah
- 1889: Battenberg
- 1890: Glöcknerin
- 1891: Martigny
- 1892: Dorn
- 1893: Wahlstatt
- 1894: Hannibal
- 1895: Waschfrau
- 1896: Dahlmann
- 1897: Geranium
- 1898: Vollmond
- 1899: Namouna
- 1900: Rachenputzer
- 1901: Tuki
- 1902: Hamilkar
- 1903: Laurin
- 1904: Real Scotch
- 1905: Zenith
- 1906: Hammurabi
- 1907: Hildegard
- 1908: Horizont
- 1909: Fervor / Glockenspiel *
- 1910: Cola Rienzi
- 1911: Royal Flower
- 1912: Royal Blue
- 1913: Orchidee
- 1914–15: no race
- 1916: Adresse
- 1917: Aversion
- 1918: Prunus
- 1919: Abschluss
- 1920: Herold
- 1921: Ossian
- 1922: Abgott
- 1923: Ganelon
- 1924: Hornbori
- 1925: Weissdorn
- 1926: Lampos
- 1927: Eisenkanzler
- 1928: Lupus
- 1929: Graf Isolani
- 1930: Gregor
- 1931: Wolkenflug
- 1932: Mio d'Arezzo
- 1933: Arjaman
- 1934: Blinzen
- 1935: Ricardo
- 1936: Wahnfried
- 1937: Abendfrieden
- 1938: Marschall Vorwärts
- 1939: Octavianus
- 1940: Samurai
- 1941: Alejana
- 1942: Gradivo
- 1943: Aufbruch
- 1944: Yngola
- 1945–46: no race
- 1947: Aikern
- 1948: Angeber
- 1949: Aubergine
- 1950: Asterios
- 1951: Jonkheer
- 1952: Tasman
- 1953: Naras
- 1954: Nardus
- 1955: Masetto
- 1956: Bernardus
- 1957: Adios
- 1958: Agio
- 1959: Ordinate
- 1960: Wicht
- 1961: Baalim
- 1962: Sudan
- 1963: Nobel
- 1964: Marinus
- 1965: Waidwerk
- 1966: Bandit
- 1967: Luciano
- 1968: Ballyboy
- 1969: Basalt

* The 1909 race was a dead-heat and has joint winners.

== See also ==
- List of German flat horse races
