= Adrie de Vries =

Dutch jockey

Personal information
- Born: Heerlen, Netherlands
- Occupation: Jockey

Horse racing career
- Sport: Horse racing

Major racing wins
- Major international races: Prix Jean Romanet (2015); Bayerisches Zuchtrennen (2024); Grosser Preis von Baden (2009); Grosser Preis von Bayern (2010, 2025); Grosser Preis von Berlin (2017); Preis von Europa (2013, 2014, 2017); Al Maktoum Challenge (2021, 2023)

Significant horses
- Bay City Roller, Calif, Campanologist, Dschingis Secret, Empoli, Getaway, Meandre, Odeliz, Salute The Soldier, Windstoss
- Updated on 18 February 2026

Adrie de Vries (b. Heerlen, 27 July 1969) is a Dutch multiple Group 1-winning jockey, who has been champion jockey in the Netherlands, Germany and Qatar. He rides primarily in Germany in the summer and the United Arab Emirates in the winter and is first jockey to Fawzi Nass in Dubai.

== Career ==
de Vries started riding in his native country, where he was champion jockey 12 times and won the Dutch Derby five times. He started out there in 1985 with Math Snackers and rode his first winner on Go Go at Duindigt. He was most successful for trainer Jan Pubben and had a total of 623 victories.

Most of his wins, however, have been in Germany, where he was champion jockey in 2014. He rode initially from 2009 to 2013 as first jockey for Gestüt Schlenderhan, then in his championship year mainly for Peter Schiergen. He rode for Markus Klug for four years in the mid-2010s, then Yasmin Almenrader at the turn of the decade, and currently operates as a freelancer. His initial steps towards riding there were made in the 1980s due to the decline of racing in his native country. His home remains in Holland, near the border and close to the main German tracks. His biggest success in Germany has been the Group 1 Deutsches Derby on Weltstar for Klug in 2018. “It took me a long time to win the German Derby, so that was a big relief,” he said of the victory. He has achieved over 1,400 wins for various trainers.

In the mid-2000s, he had a strong partnership with Lucky Strike, on which he won the 2003 Group 3 Prix de la Porte Maillot and the Bénazet-Rennen and Group 3 Flieger Trophy in both 2004 and 2005. He would win the former again in 2007 on the same horse as well as the Group 3 Silberne Peitsche. Aspectus gave him wins in the Group 3 Preis des Winterfavoriten (2005) and Dr. Busch-Memorial (2006), and Bussoni gave him repeat victories in the Group 2 Oleander-Rennen in 2006 and 2007. He won an Italian Classic in 2005, taking the Oaks d'Italia on Gyreka.

In the following years, he formed a successful partnership with Precious Boy on which he won the Group 3 Preis des Winterfavoriten in 2007, and the Group 3 Grosse Europa-Meile and Group 2 Mehl-Mülhens-Rennen in 2008 and Wiesenpfad gave him wins in the Group 3 Preis der Sparkassen-Finanzgruppe of 2007, then the Dortmund Grand Prix and Group 2 Badener Meile the following year.

His first Group 1 victory came in the 2009 Grosser Preis von Baden on Getaway and a second followed in 2010 when he took the Grosser Preis von Bayern on Campanologist. The same year he took his first German Classic - the German 1,000 Guineas on Kali. Alianthus was a key partnership, bringing big race victories in the 2010 G. P. der Landeshauptstadt Düsseldorf and Grosse Europa-Meile, and the 2011 Meilen-Trophy and Badener Meile.

2012 brought his first Royal Ascot win on Energizer, trained by Jens Hirschberger, who took the Group 3 Tercentenary Stakes, a win he described as one of his greatest experiences.

He won the Group 1 Preis von Europa three times in five years - on Meandre in 2013, Empoli in 2014 and Windstoss in 2017. Other top level victories in this period were the 2015 Prix Jean Romanet on Odeliz (on which he also won the Premio Lydia Tesio) and the 2017 Grosser Preis von Berlin on Dschingis Secret.

Since the early 1990s, he has also ridden in the winter in the United Arab Emirates winning over 140 local races from over 1,400 rides. He achieved his 2,200th career victory on April 12, 2019, in Meydan, riding The Great Collection, trained by Doug Watson. He also won two championships in Qatar (2008/09 and 2009/10).

Salute The Soldier has been a key horse for him in the Middle East. On the horse, he won two Al Maktoum Challenges in 2021 and 2023 - his biggest successes in the Emirates to date. By 2021, he was world-ranked 56 in the TRC jockey standings.

He rode for a short spell in California in 2024 after visiting his friend, Carlos Arias there.

== Riding style ==
He has been described as "something of a master at weaving through rivals" from the back of the field and "a proper horseman".

== Personal life ==
He is married to Lorna, with two adult sons and keeps a few horses in Germany as a hobby.

== Major wins ==
France

- Prix Jean Romanet - Odeliz (2015)

Germany

- Grosser Preis von Bayern - (2) - Campanologist (2010), Bay City Roller (2025)
- Preis von Europa - (3) - Meandre (2013), Empoli (2014), Windstoss (2017)
- Grosser Preis von Berlin - Dschingis Secret (2017)
- Grosser Preis von Baden - Getaway (2009)
- Bayerisches Zuchtrennen - Calif (2024)

Italy

- Premio Lydia Tesio - Odeliz (2015)
- Oaks d'Italia - Gyreka (2005)
- Premio Dormello - Scoubidou (2006)

United Arab Emirates

- Al Maktoum Challenge - (2) - Salute The Soldier (2021, 2023)

== See also ==
- List of jockeys
