= Grosse Europa-Meile =

Horse race

- Class: Group 3
- Location: Munich Racecourse; Munich, Germany
- Inaugurated: 1951
- Race type: Flat / Thoroughbred
- Sponsor: Bayerische Hausbau
- Website: Munich

Race information
- Distance: 1,600 metres (1 mile)
- Surface: Turf
- Track: Left-handed
- Qualification: Three-years-old and up
- Weight: 55½ kg (3y); 57½ kg (4y+); Allowances; 1½ kg for fillies and mares Penalties; 3 kg for Group 1 winners * 1½ kg for Group 2 winners * * since January 1
- Purse: €70,000 (2012); 1st: €40,000

The Grosse Europa-Meile is a Group 3 flat horse race in Germany open to thoroughbreds aged three years or older. It is run over a distance of 1,600 metres (about 1 mile) at Munich in September.

== History ==
The event was originally staged at Cologne as the Grosser Kaufhof-Preis. It was established in 1951, and the early runnings varied between 1,800 and 2,200 metres.

The race was shortened to a mile in 1972, and from this point it held Group 3 status. It was renamed the Elite-Preis in 1983, and promoted to Group 2 level in 1989. It reverted to its original title in 1991.

Europcar started a three-year period of sponsorship in 1998, and the event became known as the Grosse Europcar-Meile. It was later titled the Grosse Europa-Meile.

The Grosse Europa-Meile was transferred to Munich in 2011. It was relegated back to Group 3 level in 2013.

== Records ==
Most successful horse (2 wins):

- Thiggo – 1962, 1963
- Spielhahn – 1966, 1967
- Lirung – 1985, 1986
- Alkalde – 1988, 1989
- Power Flame – 1997, 1998

Leading jockey (5 wins):

- Fritz Drechsler – Fuchstanz (1951), Magus (1955), Augustus (1956), Olivetto (1959), Arcaro (1971)
- Johannes Starosta – Harmodius (1953), Thiggo (1962, 1963), Spielhahn (1966, 1967)

Leading trainer (4 wins):

- Heinz Jentzsch – Arcaro (1971), Esclavo (1980), Lirung (1985, 1986)
- Andreas Wohler - Power Flame (1997, 1998), Noor Al Hawa (2016), Delection Girl (2017)

== Winners since 1972 ==
Year	Winner	Age	Jockey	Trainer	Time
1972	Meadow Mint	3	Willie Carson	Sam Armstrong	1:56.20
1973	Leonidas	4	Horst Horwart	Robert Backes	1:36.80
1974	General Vole	3	Taffy Thomas	Ryan Jarvis	1:42.00
1975	Tirade	4	Heinz-Peter Ludewig	Herbert Block	1:38.10
1976	Kronenkranich	4	Jerzy Jednaszewski	Theo Grieper	1:39.20
1977	Wintermond	4	Peter Alafi	Hans-Georg Thalau	1:38.00
1978	Nephrit	3	Klaus Neuhaus	Friedrich Müller	1:37.90
1979	Rodaun	4	José Orihuel	Herbert Block	1:37.50
1980	Esclavo	4	Ralf Suerland	Heinz Jentzsch	1:39.40
1981	Aspros	4	Peter Remmert	Theo Grieper	1:45.10
1982	Mister Rocks	4	Peter Alafi	Sven von Mitzlaff	1:42.30
1983	Torgos	7	Peter Alafi	Fredy Scheffer	1:38.10
1984	Solarstern	5	Lutz Mäder	Hein Bollow	1:37.10
1985	Lirung	3	Georg Bocskai	Heinz Jentzsch	1:34.10
1986	Lirung	4	Georg Bocskai	Heinz Jentzsch	1:38.30
1987	Tout Est Permis	3	Éric Legrix	Philippe Lallié	1:40.80
1988	Alkalde	3	Dragan Ilic	Peter Lautner	1:41.18
1989	Alkalde	4	Lutz Mäder	Peter Lautner	1:41.40
1990	Mirror Black	4	Billy Newnes	Peter Makin	1:44.50
1991	Itsabrahma	5	Gunnar Nordling	Ewy Nordling	1:36.35
1992	Rezon	4	Waldemar Hickst	Arslangirej Savujev	1:36.53
1993	Nasr Allah	3	Andrasch Starke	Fredy Scheffer	1:43.88
1994	Erminius	3	Kevin Woodburn	Peter Rau	1:37.14
1995	A Magicman	3	Neil Grant	Hartmut Steguweit	1:34.95
1996	Accento	3	Andreas Helfenbein	Ralf Suerland	1:38.39
1997	Power Flame	4	Andreas Boschert	Andreas Wöhler	1:36.58
1998	Power Flame	5	Andreas Boschert	Andreas Wöhler	1:36.03
1999	El Divino	4	Georg Bocskai	Mario Hofer	1:38.39
2000	Bernardon (Note: Banyumanik finished first in 2000, but he was relegated to second place following a stewards' inquiry)	4	Terence Hellier	Peter Schiergen	1:40.48
2001	Aghnoyoh	3	Thierry Gillet	Tony Clout	1:41.07
2002	Royal Dragon	4	L. Hammer-Hansen	Peter Schiergen	1:36.47
2003	Peppercorn	6	Torsten Mundry	Uwe Ostmann	1:36.83
2004	Eagle Rise	4	Terence Hellier	Andreas Schütz	1:41.06
2005	Anna Monda	3	Torsten Mundry	Peter Rau	1:37.17
2006	Lateral	3	William Mongil	Peter Schiergen	1:35.08
2007	König Turf	5	Torsten Mundry	Christian Sprengel	1:35.41
2008	Precious Boy	3	Adrie de Vries	Waldemar Hickst	1:37.46
2009	Premio Loco	5	George Baker	Chris Wall	1:35.21
2010	Alianthus	5	Adrie de Vries	Jens Hirschberger	1:38.01
2011	Sommerabend	4	Gérald Mossé	Uwe Stoltefuss	1:39.82
2012	Combat Zone	6	Norman Richter	Mario Hofer	1:37.03
2013	Samba Brazil	4	Andrea Atzeni	Jens Hirschberger	1:39.54
2014	Nordico	3	Eddy Hardouin	Mario Hofer	1:43.54
2015	Pas De Deux	5	Antoine Coutier	Yasmin Almenrader	1:37.64
2016	Noor Al Hawa	3	Eduardo Pedroza	Andreas Wohler	1:37.05
2017	Delection Girl	3	Eduardo Pedroza	Andreas Wohler	1:38.62
2018	Degas	5	Adrie de Vries	Markus Klug	1:35.46

== Earlier winners ==
- 1951: Fuchstanz
- 1952: no race
- 1953: Harmodius
- 1954: Nizam
- 1955: Magus
- 1956: Augustus
- 1957: Feuerball
- 1958: Opernsänger
- 1959: Olivetto
- 1960: Kaiseradler
- 1961: Aspiration
- 1962: Thiggo
- 1963: Thiggo
- 1964: Lucius
- 1965: Sissu
- 1966: Spielhahn
- 1967: Spielhahn
- 1968: Lohengrin
- 1969: Delabarre
- 1970: Bernod
- 1971: Arcaro

== See also ==
- List of German flat horse races
- Recurring sporting events established in 1951 – this race is included under its original title, Grosser Kaufhof-Preis.
