= Swain (horse) =

Irish-bred Thoroughbred racehorse

- Sire: Nashwan
- Grandsire: Blushing Groom
- Dam: Love Smitten
- Damsire: Key To The Mint
- Sex: Stallion
- Foaled: 12 February 1992
- Country: Ireland
- Colour: Bay
- Breeder: Sheikh Mohammed
- Owner: Sheikh Mohammed; Godolphin Stables (1997-)
- Trainer: André Fabre; Saeed bin Suroor (1997-)
- Record: 22: 10-4-6
- Earnings: $3,797,566

Major wins
- Prix du Lys (1995); Prix de Reux (1995); Grand Prix de Deauville (1995); Coronation Cup (1996); Prix Foy (1996); K. George VI & Q. Elizabeth Stakes (1997, 1998); Irish Champion Stakes (1998)

Awards
- European Top Older Horse (1998)
- Last updated on May 9, 2012

Swain (12 February 1992 – 27 July 2022) was an Irish-bred Thoroughbred racehorse and sire. He is one of only three horses to win two editions of Britain's premier weight-for-age race, the King George VI and Queen Elizabeth Stakes.

== Background ==
Swain was a bay horse with a white star and snip and white socks on his hind legs bred in Ireland by his owner Sheikh Mohammed. He was one of the best horses sired by Nashwan, the 1989 Epsom Derby winner. Swain's dam, Love Smitten was a successful Canadian-bred racemare whose wins included the Grade I Apple Blossom Handicap. The colt was originally sent into training in France with André Fabre.

== Racing career ==
Swain began his racing career in France in 1995 when he won his first five races including the Group Three Prix du Lys, the Listed Prix Reux and the Grand Prix de Deauville. On his final race of the season he started 11/5 second favourite as part of Sheikh Mohammed's entry for the Prix de l'Arc de Triomphe. He finished third of the sixteen runners, beaten three-quarters of a length and two lengths behind Lammtarra and Freedom Cry.

At four, he was finished third in the Prix Ganay before being sent to England where he recorded his first success at Group One level when beating Singspiel by a neck in the Coronation Cup. He then finished second to Helissio in the 1996 Grand Prix de Saint-Cloud, and defeated Pentire in the Prix Foy. He finished fourth in his second attempt at the Prix de l'Arc de Triomphe before being shipped to North America for the 1996 Breeders' Cup Turf at Woodbine Racetrack: Swain finished third behind Pilsudski and Singspiel. At the end of the 1996 season, Swain was transferred to his owners Godolphin organisation and entered the stable of Saeed bin Suroor.

At age five in 1997, Swain defeated both Pilsudski and Helissio to win the 1997 King George VI and Queen Elizabeth Stakes. He returned in 1998 to repeat as the winner, making him (at age six) the oldest horse to win the King George VI and Queen Elizabeth Stakes and the first back-to-back winner since Dahlia in 1973–74. He also won the 1998 Irish Champion Stakes, but finished second in that year's Coronation Cup and second to Silver Charm in the Dubai World Cup. Sent to Churchill Downs in Louisville, Kentucky for the 1998 Breeders' Cup Classic, Swain wound up his racing career with a third-place finish to Awesome Again and Silver Charm.

After earning $3,797,566 in racing, Swain was retired to stud duty.

== Progeny ==
Swain retired to stand stud at Shadwell's Kentucky farm in 1999 before being relocated to Ascot Stud, Ontario in 2013. Swain was not a success as a stallion: during his time at stud in Canada his stud fee fell from $35,000 to $4,000. He sired 13 stakes winners including:

- Dimitrova (Flower Bowl Invitational Stakes) Gr-1.
- Nasheej (May Hill Stakes) Gr-2.
- Muqbil (Greenham Stakes) Gr-3.

Swain was pensioned from stud duty in October 2011 and was returned to Shadwell in Kentucky. Swain's last standing fee was CA$3,500. In 2022, he was relocated to Old Friends as part of a downsizing program following the death of Shadwell owner Sheikh Hamdan bin Rashid Al Maktoum.

He was euthanized on 27 July 2022 due to the infirmities of old age.

== Pedigree ==
Pedigree of Swain (IRE), dark bay stallion, 1992
Sire Nashwan (USA) 1986	Blushing Groom (FR); 1974	Red God	Nasrullah
Sire Nashwan (USA) 1986	Blushing Groom (FR); 1974	Red God	Spring Run
Sire Nashwan (USA) 1986	Blushing Groom (FR); 1974	Runaway Bride	Wild Risk
Sire Nashwan (USA) 1986	Blushing Groom (FR); 1974	Runaway Bride	Aimée
Sire Nashwan (USA) 1986	Height of Fashion (GB); 1979	Bustino	Busted
Sire Nashwan (USA) 1986	Height of Fashion (GB); 1979	Bustino	Ship Yard
Sire Nashwan (USA) 1986	Height of Fashion (GB); 1979	Highclere	Queen's Hussar
Sire Nashwan (USA) 1986	Height of Fashion (GB); 1979	Highclere	Highlight
Dam Love Smitten (CAN) 1981	Key to the Mint (USA); 1969	Graustark	Ribot
Dam Love Smitten (CAN) 1981	Key to the Mint (USA); 1969	Graustark	Flower Bowl
Dam Love Smitten (CAN) 1981	Key to the Mint (USA); 1969	Key Bridge	Princequillo
Dam Love Smitten (CAN) 1981	Key to the Mint (USA); 1969	Key Bridge	Blue Banner
Dam Love Smitten (CAN) 1981	Square Angel (CAN); 1970	Quadrangle	Cohoes
Dam Love Smitten (CAN) 1981	Square Angel (CAN); 1970	Quadrangle	Tap Day
Dam Love Smitten (CAN) 1981	Square Angel (CAN); 1970	Nangela	Nearctic
Dam Love Smitten (CAN) 1981	Square Angel (CAN); 1970	Nangela	Angela's Niece
