= Solford =

American-bred Thoroughbred racehorse

- Sire: Nijinsky
- Grandsire: Northern Dancer
- Dam: Fairness
- Damsire: Cavan
- Sex: Stallion
- Foaled: 31 January 1980
- Country: United States
- Colour: Bay
- Breeder: King Ranch
- Owner: Robert Sangster
- Trainer: Vincent O'Brien
- Record: 6:5-0-0

Major wins
- Prix du Lys (1983); Eclipse Stakes (1983)

Awards
- Timeform rating=127 in 1983

Solford (foaled 31 January 1980) was an American-bred, Irish-trained Thoroughbred racehorse and sire. He was undefeated in his first five races, culminating in a victory over a strong international field in the Eclipse Stakes in 1983. He also defeated the Prix du Jockey Club winner Caerleon at Phoenix Park Racecourse and won the Prix du Lys in France. He ran poorly in his only race after the Eclipse and was retired to stud, where he had no impact as a sire of winners.

== Background ==
Solford was a bay horse with a white blaze and white markings on three of his feet bred in Kentucky by King Ranch. Solford was sired by Nijinsky, the Canadian-bred winner of the English Triple Crown in 1970 who went on to become an important stallion, siring horses such as Ferdinand, Lammtarra, Sky Classic and Shahrastani. His dam, Fairness, never raced, but was a full-sister to Prove Out, and had previously produced the Vosburgh Stakes winner No Bias. Fairness' dam Equal Venture, was a sister of the Triple Crown winner Assault.

As a yearling, Solford was sent to the Fasig-Tipton sales where he was sold for $1,700,000 to representatives of the British owner Robert Sangster. Like most of Sangster's best horses, Solford was sent to Ireland to be trained by Vincent O'Brien at Ballydoyle. The name of Solford had previously been used for a gelding which won the Champion Hurdle in 1940.

== Racing career ==
Solford ran twice as a two-year-old in 1982 and was undefeated, winning minor events at the Curragh and Leopardstown. On each occasion he was made the 2/5 favourite but his margins of victory were narrow and he was not considered one of his stable's best juveniles.

Solford was scheduled to make his three-year-old debut in the Ballysax Race at the Curragh in April but was withdrawn just before the race after appearing sickly in the paddock. He was found to be running a slight temperature and was suffering from a skin condition. After more than a month of the course he returned for a race over ten furlongs at Phoenix Park Racecourse in which he was matched against his stable companion Caerleon. Ridden by the stable's first-choice jockey Pat Eddery Solford started favourite and won by three-quarters of a length from Caerleon, who was carrying eight pounds more. On the day in June that Caerleon won the Prix du Jockey Club over 2400 metres at Chantilly Racecourse, Solford contested the Group Three Prix du Lys over the same course and distance. Wearing blinkers for the only time in his career, Solford started the 1/2 favourite and won easily from moderate opposition.

A month later, Solford was moved up to Group One class and was tested against older horses in the Eclipse Stakes over ten furlongs at Sandown Park Racecourse. He was made second favourite at odds of 3/1 against a field which included Stanerra, Time Charter and Tolomeo. The pace was very slow in the early stages and the race developed into a sprint in the last quarter mile with several runners struggling to obtain a clear run. Eddery sent Solford into the lead approaching the final furlong and the colt held off a series of challenges to win by a head from Muscatite, with Tolomeo, Guns of Navarone and Stanerra less than a length behind.

At York Racecourse on 17 August, Solford started second favourite behind The Derby winner Teenoso in the Group Two Great Voltigeur Stakes. The Irish colt looked unimpressive before the race and ran poorly to finish fourth of the five runners, fifteen lengths behind the winner Seymour Hicks.

== Assessment ==
In the official International Classification for 1983, Solford was given a rating of 84, making joint-eighth among the season's three-year-old colt, nine pounds below the top-rated Shareef Dancer. The independent Timeform organisation gave him a rating of 127.

== Stud record ==
Solford retired from racing at the end of 1983 to become a breeding stallion at the Winfield Farm in Lexington, Kentucky. He proved to be a very disappointing sire, with the best of his offspring probably being Enzo, the winner of the Listed Eyrefield Stakes at the Curragh in 1990.

== Pedigree ==
Pedigree of Solford (USA), bay stallion, 1980
Sire Nijinsky (CAN) 1967	Northern Dancer (CAN); 1961	Nearctic	Nearco
Sire Nijinsky (CAN) 1967	Northern Dancer (CAN); 1961	Nearctic	Lady Angela
Sire Nijinsky (CAN) 1967	Northern Dancer (CAN); 1961	Natalma	Native Dancer
Sire Nijinsky (CAN) 1967	Northern Dancer (CAN); 1961	Natalma	Almahmoud
Sire Nijinsky (CAN) 1967	Flaming Page (CAN); 1959	Bull Page	Bull Lea
Sire Nijinsky (CAN) 1967	Flaming Page (CAN); 1959	Bull Page	Our Page
Sire Nijinsky (CAN) 1967	Flaming Page (CAN); 1959	Flaring Top	Menow
Sire Nijinsky (CAN) 1967	Flaming Page (CAN); 1959	Flaring Top	Flaming Top
Dam Fairness (USA) 1963	Cavan (GB); 1955	Mossborough	Nearco
Dam Fairness (USA) 1963	Cavan (GB); 1955	Mossborough	All Moonshine
Dam Fairness (USA) 1963	Cavan (GB); 1955	Willow Ann	Solario
Dam Fairness (USA) 1963	Cavan (GB); 1955	Willow Ann	Court Appeal
Dam Fairness (USA) 1963	Equal Venture (USA); 1953	Bold Venture	St Germans
Dam Fairness (USA) 1963	Equal Venture (USA); 1953	Bold Venture	Possible
Dam Fairness (USA) 1963	Equal Venture (USA); 1953	Igual	Equipoise
Dam Fairness (USA) 1963	Equal Venture (USA); 1953	Igual	Incandescence (Family:4-c)
