= Nasram =

American-bred Thoroughbred racehorse

- Sire: Nasrullah
- Grandsire: Nearco
- Dam: La Mirambule
- Damsire: Coaraze
- Sex: Stallion
- Foaled: 1960
- Country: United States
- Colour: Bay
- Breeder: Howell E. Jackson
- Owner: Howell E. Jackson
- Trainer: Etienne Pollet; Ernest Fellows
- Record: 16:3-?-?

Major wins
- Prix du Lys (1963); King George VI and Queen Elizabeth Stakes (1964)

Nasram (1960 – after 1970), also known as Nasram II, was an American-bred Thoroughbred race horse and sire who was trained in the United States and France. His early career was undistinguished but in July 1964 he recorded an upset win over Santa Claus in the King George VI and Queen Elizabeth Stakes. Nasram was retired from racing at the end of the season and stood as a breeding stallion in America and Germany.

== Background ==
Nasram was a bay horse bred in Kentucky by his owners Mr and Mrs Howell E. Jackson. He was sired by Nasrullah who was the Leading sire in Great Britain and Ireland in 1951 and went on to become the Leading sire in North America on five occasions. Nasram's dam, La Mirambule won the Prix Vermeille in 1952 and was later bought by the Jackson's and exported to America.

== Racing career ==
=== 1962: two-year-old season ===
As a two-year-old, Nasram was trained in the United States, but failed to win.

=== 1963: three-year-old season ===
Nasram was sent to Europe to be trained by Etienne Pollet at Chantilly. He won the Prix du Lys but appeared to be just below top class.

=== 1964: four-year-old season ===
As a four-year-old, Nasram was moved to the stable of the Australian-born Ernie Fellows. In July he was sent to England to contest the King George VI and Queen Elizabeth Stakes at Ascot Racecourse. The Epsom Derby winner Santa Claus started favourite at odds of 2/13, with only Nasram and two others opposing him. Ridden by Bill Pyers Nasram appeared well-suited by the hard ground and led from the start. He was never seriously challenged and recorded one of the biggest upsets in British racing history in winning by two lengths from Santa Claus, with Royal Avenue a further four lengths away in third. The King George was Nasram's only win in eight starts in 1964. In October he was unplaced behind Prince Royal and Santa Claus.

== Assessment ==
Nasram was awarded a rating of 125 by Timeform in 1964.

In their book A Century of Champions, John Randall and Tony Morris rated Nasram the worst horse ever to win the King George VI and Queen Elizabeth Stakes, describing him as a "faint-hearted front-runner who capitulated when challenged".

== Stud record ==
Nasram had some success as a stallion. He sired the 1970 Everglades Stakes winner Naskra, who went on to be a successful stallion. He was also the sire of the German champion Athenagoras who won the Deutsches Derby, Aral-Pokal and Grosser Preis von Baden.

== Pedigree ==
Pedigree of Nasram (USA), bay stallion, 1960
Sire Nasrullah (GB) 1940	Nearco (ITY); 1935	Pharos	Phalaris
Sire Nasrullah (GB) 1940	Nearco (ITY); 1935	Pharos	Scapa Flow
Sire Nasrullah (GB) 1940	Nearco (ITY); 1935	Nogara	Havresac
Sire Nasrullah (GB) 1940	Nearco (ITY); 1935	Nogara	Catnip
Sire Nasrullah (GB) 1940	Mumtaz Begum (FR); 1932	Blenheim	Blandford
Sire Nasrullah (GB) 1940	Mumtaz Begum (FR); 1932	Blenheim	Malva
Sire Nasrullah (GB) 1940	Mumtaz Begum (FR); 1932	Mumtaz Mahal	The Tetrarch
Sire Nasrullah (GB) 1940	Mumtaz Begum (FR); 1932	Mumtaz Mahal	Lady Josephine
Dam La Mirambule (FR) 1949	Coaraze (FR); 1942	Tourbillon	Ksar
Dam La Mirambule (FR) 1949	Coaraze (FR); 1942	Tourbillon	Durban
Dam La Mirambule (FR) 1949	Coaraze (FR); 1942	Corrida	Coronach
Dam La Mirambule (FR) 1949	Coaraze (FR); 1942	Corrida	Zariba
Dam La Mirambule (FR) 1949	La Futaie (FR); 1937	Gris Perle	Brabant
Dam La Mirambule (FR) 1949	La Futaie (FR); 1937	Gris Perle	Mauve
Dam La Mirambule (FR) 1949	La Futaie (FR); 1937	La Futelaye	Collaborator
Dam La Mirambule (FR) 1949	La Futaie (FR); 1937	La Futelaye	La Francaise (Family 11-d)
