= Prix du Lys =

Flat horse race in France

- Class: Group 3
- Location: Longchamp Racecourse; Paris, France
- Inaugurated: 1922
- Race type: Flat / Thoroughbred
- Website: france-galop.com

Race information
- Distance: 2,400 metres (1½ miles)
- Surface: Turf
- Track: Right-handed
- Qualification: Three-year-old colts and geldings excluding Group 1 winners
- Weight: 56 kg Penalties; 2½ kg for Group 2 winners * 1½ kg for Group 3 winners * * since January 1
- Purse: €80,000 (2022); 1st: €40,000

Prix du Lys
2025
Rafale Design	Surabad	Oracle

Previous years
2024
Delius	Saganti	Internaute
2023
Rubis Vendome	Silawi	Maniatic
2022
Simca Mille	Virtual Rock	Martel
2021
Northern Ruler	Bubble Gift	Gabello

2020-2011
2020
Volkan Star	Ketil	Measure Of Time
2019
Quest The Moon	Khagan	Moonlight Spirit
2018
Neufbosc	Mahoe	King Of Camelot
2017
Called To The Bar	Ice Breeze	Shakeel
2016
Spring Master	Golden Valentine	Al Haram
2015
Erupt	Sarrasin	Pilansberg
2014
Guardini	Teletext	Premium Champion
2013
Flintshire	Park Reel	Tres Blue
2012
Remus De La Tour	Masterstroke	Ashkiyr
2011
Kreem	Ibicenco	Beaulieu

2010–2001
2010
Goldwaki	Mashoor	Le Larron
2009
Claremont	World Heritage	Almail
2008
Montmartre	Zack Dream	Watar
2007
Airmail Special	Le Paradis	Garda
2006
Rail Link	Sudan	Britannic
2005
Desideratum	Orion Star	Crabapple
2004
Prospect Park	Lord Darnley	Lyonels Glory
2003
Doyen	Policy Maker	Mosogno
2002
Morozov	Suleiman	Swing Wing
2001
Sharbayan	Roman Saddle	Chronos

2000–1998
2000
Lycitus	Epitre	Bourgeois
1999
Spendent	Northerntown	Casamasa
1998
Epistolaire	Blushing Risk	Phebus

The Prix du Lys is a Group 3 flat horse race in France open to three-year-old thoroughbred colts and geldings. It is run at Longchamp over a distance of 2,400 metres (about 1½ miles), and it is scheduled to take place each year in May.

== History ==
The event is named after Le Lys, a small forest close to Chantilly on the left bank of the Oise river. It was established in 1922, and was originally open to colts and fillies, but not geldings. Its distance was 2,400 metres. It was initially restricted to horses not entered for the Prix du Jockey Club or the Prix de Diane.

The Prix du Lys was cancelled in 1940, and was held at Longchamp in 1941 and 1942. It was run at Le Tremblay over 2,300 metres in 1943 and 1944, and at Longchamp again for three years thereafter.

The exclusion of Prix du Jockey Club and Prix de Diane entrants ended in 1970. The race was closed to fillies and opened to geldings in 1986.

The Prix du Lys was contested over 2,800 metres at Saint-Cloud from 1993 to 1996. In the following years it was run over 2,600 metres at Maisons-Laffitte (1997–98) and Chantilly (1999–2000).

The race's original distance was restored in 2001, and from this point it was staged at Longchamp. It returned to Chantilly in 2009 and was run there until 2016. In 2017 it was run at Saint-Cloud and since 2018 it has been staged at Longchamp again. It is currently held on the same day as the Prix d'Ispahan and Prix Saint-Alary.

== Records ==
Leading jockey (6 wins):

- Roger Poincelet – Djelal (1947), Mistralor (1954), Jithaka (1956), Rugby (1962), Nasram (1963), Steady (1967)
- Freddy Head – Mazarin (1969), Azorello (1973), Ercolano (1977), Fabulous Dancer (1979), Bellman (1981), Iris Noir (1984)

Leading trainer (15 wins):

- André Fabre – Iris Noir (1984), Luth Dancer (1987), Northern Spur (1994), Swain (1995), Vertical Speed (1997), Epistolaire (1998), Morozov (2002), Doyen (2003), Desideratum (2005), Rail Link (2006), Airmail Special (2007), Claremont (2009), Goldwaki (2010), Kreem (2011), Flintshire (2013)

Leading owner (6 wins):

- Sheikh Mohammed – Swain (1995), Morozov (2002), Doyen (2003), Desideratum (2005), Airmail Special (2007), Claremont (2009)

== Winners since 1979 ==
Year	Winner	Jockey	Trainer	Owner	Time
1979	Fabulous Dancer	Freddy Head	Criquette Head	Ghislaine Head	2:32.70
1980	Lancastrian	Alain Lequeux	David Smaga	Sir Michael Sobell
1981	Bellman	Freddy Head	Criquette Head	Ecurie Aland
1982	Coquelin	Cash Asmussen	François Boutin	Stavros Niarchos
1983	Solford	Pat Eddery	Vincent O'Brien	Robert Sangster
1984	Iris Noir	Freddy Head	André Fabre	Guy de Rothschild
1985	Iades	Cash Asmussen	François Boutin	Niccolò Incisa Rocchetta
1986	Chercheur d'Or	Gary W. Moore	Criquette Head	Jacques Wertheimer
1987	Luth Dancer	Pat Eddery	André Fabre	Paul de Moussac
1988	Frankly Perfect	Pat Eddery	Jonathan Pease	Bruce McNall	2:28.00
1989	Harvest Time	Joel Boisnard	Henri-Alex Pantall	Paul de Moussac	2:33.90
1990	Comte du Bourg	Dominique Boeuf	Raymond Touflan	Adolf Bader	2:31.20
1991	Strike Oil (Note: Glity finished first in 1991, but he was relegated to fourth place following a stewards' inquiry)	Alain Lequeux	John Cunnington Jr.	Lord Weinstock	2:33.40
1992	Songlines	Olivier Benoist	Edouard Bartholomew	Sir Robin McAlpine	2:33.60
1993	Epaphos	Éric Legrix	Pascal Bary	Egon Wanke	2:59.30
1994	Northern Spur	Thierry Jarnet	André Fabre	Tomohiro Wada	3:04.20
1995	Swain	Thierry Jarnet	André Fabre	Sheikh Mohammed	3:01.20
1996	Cachet Noir	Frédéric Grenet	Pascal Bary	Juan Garcia-Roady	3:11.80
1997	Vertical Speed	Thierry Jarnet	André Fabre	Daniel Wildenstein	2:55.00
1998	Epistolaire	Thierry Gillet	André Fabre	Edouard de Rothschild	2:53.50
1999	Spendent	Thierry Thulliez	Pascal Bary	Khalid Abdullah	2:45.60
2000	Lycitus	Gérald Mossé	François Doumen	John Martin	2:48.60
2001	Sharbayan	Gérald Mossé	Alain de Royer-Dupré	HH Aga Khan IV	2:31.40
2002	Morozov	Olivier Peslier	André Fabre	Sheikh Mohammed	2:35.20
2003	Doyen	Frankie Dettori	André Fabre	Sheikh Mohammed	2:31.20
2004	Prospect Park	Olivier Peslier	Carlos Laffon-Parias	Wertheimer et Frère	2:29.20
2005	Desideratum	Christophe Soumillon	André Fabre	Sheikh Mohammed	2:34.00
2006	Rail Link	Christophe Soumillon	André Fabre	Khalid Abdullah	2:32.20
2007	Airmail Special	Stéphane Pasquier	André Fabre	Sheikh Mohammed	2:38.10
2008	Montmartre	Christophe Soumillon	Alain de Royer-Dupré	HH Aga Khan IV	2:28.90
2009	Claremont	Maxime Guyon	André Fabre	Sheikh Mohammed	2:28.62
2010	Goldwaki	Olivier Peslier	André Fabre	Wertheimer et Frère	2:31.40
2011	Kreem	Maxime Guyon	André Fabre	Muteb bin Abdullah	2:28.71
2012	Remus de la Tour	Davy Bonilla	Keven Borgel	Barthélémy Vives	2:37.27
2013	Flintshire	Maxime Guyon	André Fabre	Khalid Abdullah	2:28.03
2014	Guardini	Christophe Soumillon	Jean-Pierre Carvalho	Stall Ullmann	2:30.45
2015	Erupt	Stéphane Pasquier	Francis-Henri Graffard	Niarchos Family	2:30.07
2016	Spring Master	Olivier Peslier	Pascal Bary	Jean-Louis Bouchard	2:33.94
2017	Called To The Bar	Mickael Barzalona	Pia Brandt	Fair Salinia Ltd	2:35.74
2018	Neufbosc	Cristian Demuro	Pia Brandt	Gerard Augustin-Normand	2:32.55
2019	Quest The Moon	Cristian Demuro	Sarah Steinbeg	Stall Salzburg	2:31.27
2020	Volkan Star (Note: The 2020 race was run in July due to the COVID-19 pandemic in France)	William Buick	Charlie Appleby	Godolphin	2:30.86
2021	Northern Ruler (Note: The 2021 running was held at Chantilly)	Maxime Guyon	Andreas Wöhler	Gestut Schlenderhan	2:35.99
2022	Simca Mille (Note: The 2022 running was held at Chantilly)	Theo Bachelot	Stephane Wattel	Haras De La Perelle & S Wattel	2:28.70
2023	Rubis Vendome	Oisin Murphy	Mario Baratti	Guy Pariente Holding	2:29.40
2024	Delius	Christophe Soumillon	Jean-Claude Rouget	Magnier /Tabor / Smith / Westerberg	2:30.32
2026	Space Waltz	Stéphane Pasquier	André Fabre	Flaxman Stables Ireland Ltd	2:26:09

== Earlier winners ==
- 1922: Mazeppa
- 1923: Grand Guignol
- 1924: Scaramouche
- 1925: Chubasco
- 1926: Felton
- 1927: Sachet
- 1928: Bachelier
- 1929: Double Dutch
- 1930: Menthol
- 1931: Triberg
- 1932: Satrap
- 1933: Magnus
- 1934: Verset
- 1935: Will of the Wisp
- 1936: Fantastic
- 1937: Khasnadar
- 1938: Molitor
- 1939: Shrift
- 1940: no race
- 1941: Nepenthe
- 1942:
- 1943: Bambou
- 1944: Orsava
- 1945: Kerlor
- 1946: Eclair
- 1947: Djelal
- 1948: Espace Vital
- 1949: Urfe
- 1950: Alizier
- 1951: Pharas
- 1952: Orfeo
- 1953: Sunny Dream
- 1954: Mistralor
- 1955: Fauchelevent
- 1956: Jithaka
- 1957: Mehdi
- 1958: Upstart
- 1959: Memorandum
- 1960: Tehuelche
- 1961: Le Bois Sacre
- 1962: Rugby
- 1963: Nasram
- 1964: Trade Mark
- 1965:
- 1966: Danseur
- 1967: Steady
- 1968: Vaguely Noble
- 1969: Mazarin
- 1970: High Game
- 1971: Music Man
- 1972: Hair Do
- 1973: Azorello
- 1974: Blue Diamond
- 1975: Corby
- 1976: Exceller
- 1977: Ercolano
- 1978: Nizon

== See also ==
- List of French flat horse races
