= Dr. Busch-Memorial =

Flat horse race in Germany

Dr. Busch-Memorial Grosser Ehrmann-Cup
- Class: Group 3
- Location: Krefeld Racecourse; Krefeld, Germany
- Race type: Flat / Thoroughbred
- Website: Krefeld

Race information
- Distance: 1,700 m (1 mi 99 yd)
- Surface: Turf
- Track: Right-handed
- Qualification: Three-year-olds
- Weight: 58 kg Allowances; 2 kg for fillies
- Purse: €55,000 (2022); 1st: €32,000

The Dr. Busch-Memorial is a Group 3 flat horse race in Germany open to three-year-old thoroughbreds. It is run over a distance of 1,700 metres (1 mile 99 yards) at Krefeld in April.

== History ==
The event used to be held at Hoppegarten, and it was originally known as the Preis von Dahlwitz. It was transferred to Krefeld in 1950, and from this point it was called the Paul Döring-Rennen. It was subsequently renamed in memory of Max Busch, a former president of Krefeld Racecourse.

For a period the Dr. Busch-Memorial was contested over 1,650 metres. It was extended to 1,700 metres in 1968.

The Dr. Busch-Memorial was given Group 3 status in 1994. That year's edition was run over 1,600 metres at Cologne. It was run over the same distance at Hoppegarten in 1997. It was relegated to Listed level and cut to 1,400 metres in 1998.

The race reverted to 1,700 metres in 1999. It was promoted back to Group 3 in 2000.

== Records ==
Leading jockey since 1950 (7 wins):

- Andrasch Starke - Eden Rock (1997), Samum (2000), Limerick Boy (2001), Davidoff (2007), Chopin (2013), Rubaiyat (2020), Mylady (2022)

Leading trainer since 1950 (12 wins):

- Heinz Jentzsch – Dschingis Khan (1964), Bacchus (1968), Hitchcock (1969), Honduras (1973), Swazi (1976), Trianon (1978), Tombos (1982), Lagunas (1984), Bismarck (1985), Zampano (1987), Kalambo (1988), Surako (1996)

== Winners since 1980 ==
Year	Winner	Jockey	Trainer	Time
1980	Bertone	Peter Alafi	Horst Degner	1:50.00
1981	Un Sprinter	Lutz Mäder	Hein Bollow	1:45.30
1982	Tombos	Georg Bocskai	Heinz Jentzsch	1:45.50
1983	Gilmore	Peter Schade	Sven von Mitzlaff	1:52.40
1984	Lagunas	Georg Bocskai	Heinz Jentzsch	1:46.60
1985	Bismarck	Georg Bocskai	Heinz Jentzsch	1:55.30
1986	Oldtimer	Peter Remmert	Hein Bollow	2:00.00
1987	Zampano	Georg Bocskai	Heinz Jentzsch	1:47.30
1988	Kalambo	Georg Bocskai	Heinz Jentzsch	1:45.00
1989	Claridge	Billy Newnes	Uwe Ostmann	1:55.80
1990	Mandelbaum	Georg Bocskai	Uwe Ostmann	1:46.00
1991	Lomitas	Terence Hellier	Andreas Wöhler	1:47.47
1992	Platini	Mark Rimmer	Bruno Schütz	1:50.60
1993	Kornado	Andre Best	Bruno Schütz	1:50.10
1994	Dyhim	Bruce Raymond	Andreas Wöhler	1:38.39
1995	Ladoni	Kevin Woodburn	Harro Remmert	1:46.98
1996	Surako	Peter Schiergen	Heinz Jentzsch	1:46.60
1997	Eden Rock	Andrasch Starke	Bruno Schütz	1:38.20
1998	Minaccia	Alessandro Schikora	Peter Schiergen	1:34.74
1999	Sumitas	Andreas Suborics	Peter Schiergen	1:51.10
2000	Samum	Andrasch Starke	Andreas Schütz	1:50.98
2001	Limerick Boy	Andrasch Starke	Andreas Schütz	1:57.59
2002	Next Desert	Terence Hellier	Andreas Schütz
2003	Soldier Hollow	Filip Minarik	Peter Schiergen	1:43.63
2004	Assiun	Andreas Suborics	Peter Schiergen	1:45.17
2005	Idealist	Terence Hellier	Peter Schiergen	1:46.09
2006	Aspectus	Adrie de Vries	Hans Blume	1:47.97
2007	Davidoff	Andrasch Starke	Peter Schiergen	1:45.20
2008	Liang Kay	Terence Hellier	Uwe Ostmann	1:48.00
2009	Irian	Adrie de Vries	Jens Hirschberger	1:45.20
2010	Zazou	Terence Hellier	Mario Hofer	1:44.09
2011	Lindenthaler	Adrie de Vries	Peter Schiergen	1:45.05
2012	Amaron	Davy Bonilla	Andreas Löwe	1:50.42
2013	Chopin	Andrasch Starke	Andreas Wöhler	1:43.71
2014	Lucky Lion	Alexander Weis	Andreas Löwe	1:48.21
2015	Karpino	Andrea Atzeni	Andreas Wöhler	1:47.48
2016	Millowitsch	Andreas Helfenbein	Markus Klug	1:43.36
2017	Dragon Lips	Marc Lerner	Andreas Suborics	1:43.00
2018	Kronprinz	Filip Minarik	Peter Schiergen	1:43.00
2019	Winterfuchs	Sibylle Vogt	Carmen Bocskai	1:44.70
2020	Rubaiyat^{1}	Andrasch Starke	Henk Grewe	1:38.60
2021	Best Of Lips	Lukas Delozier	Andreas Suborics	1:44.54
2022	Mylady	Andrasch Starke	Markus Klug	1:44.25
2023	Brave Emperor	Luke Morris	Archie Watson	1:48.52
2024	Maigret	Lukas Delozier	Bohumil Nedorostek	1:50.61
2025	Namaron	Leon Wolff	Henk Grewe	1:44.78
2026	Asker	Leon Wolff	Henk Grewe	1:43.06

1. Race was held at Hoppegarten in May.

== Earlier winners ==
- 1950: Firmament
- 1951: Neckar
- 1952: Bernadette
- 1953: Naxos
- 1954: Atatürk
- 1955: Masetto
- 1956: Bernardus
- 1957: Menes
- 1958: Pfalzteufel
- 1959: Waldcanter
- 1960: Wiener Walzer
- 1961: Orlog
- 1962: Mardonios
- 1963: Gladstone
- 1964: Dschingis Khan
- 1965: Fioravanti
- 1966: Volvo
- 1967: Obermain
- 1968: Bacchus
- 1969: Hitchcock
- 1970: Gerona
- 1971: Dulcia
- 1972: Caracol
- 1973: Honduras
- 1974: Loisach
- 1975: Kronenkranich
- 1976: Swazi
- 1977: Cagliostro
- 1978: Trianon
- 1979: Nebos

== See also ==
- List of German flat horse races
