= Irian (horse) =

German-bred Thoroughbred racehorse

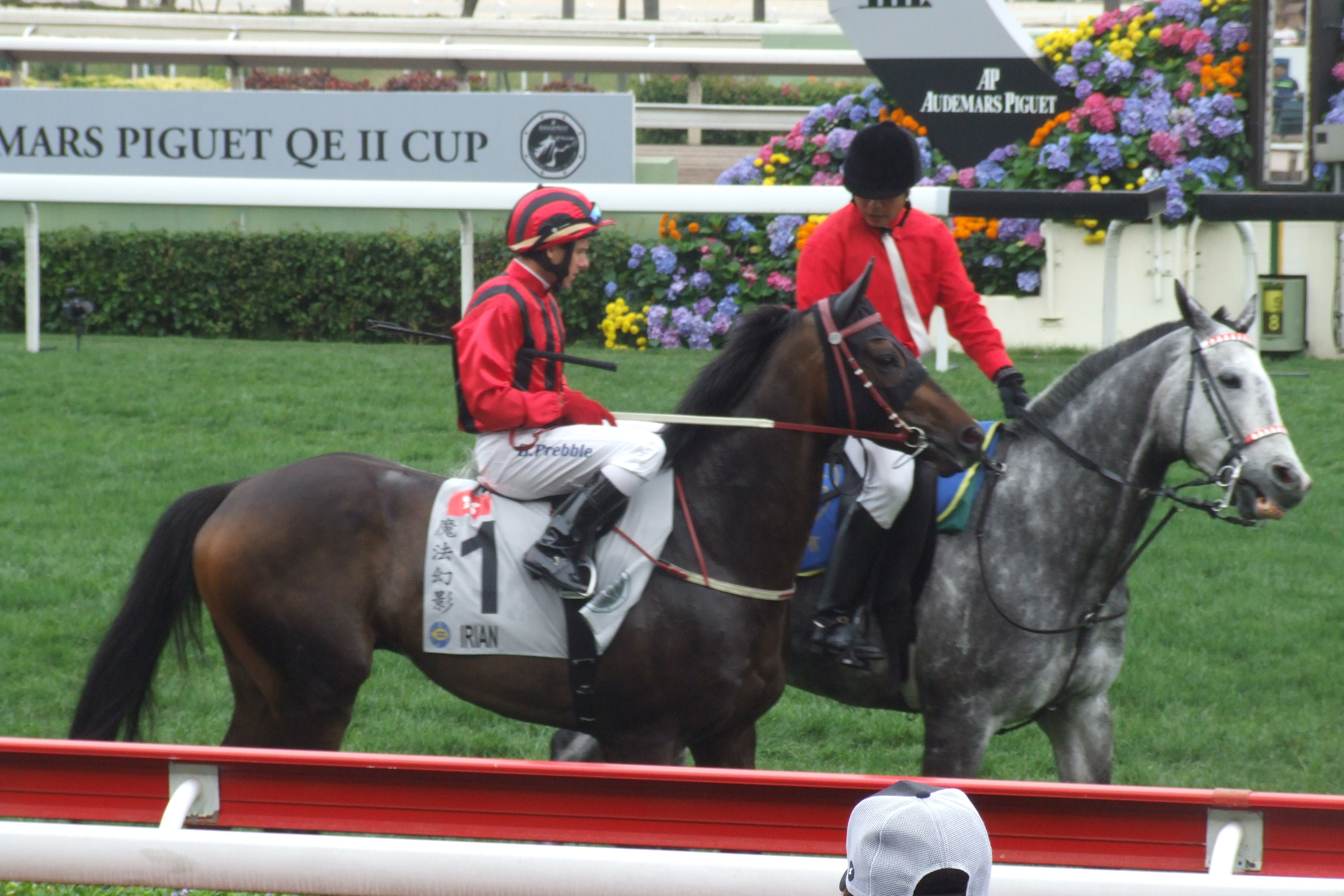
- Sire: Tertullian
- Grandsire: Miswaki
- Dam: Iberi
- Damsire: Rainbow Quest
- Sex: Gelding
- Foaled: 9 May 2006
- Country: Germany
- Colour: Brown
- Breeder: Gestut Schlenderhan
- Owner: Siu Pak Kwan
- Trainer: John Moore
- Record: 35:4-4-4
- Earnings: HK$18,410,238 (As of 18 May 2015)

Major wins
- Dr. Busch-Memorial (2009); Mehl-Mülhens-Rennen (2009); Jockey Club Cup (Hong Kong) (2010)

Irian (Chinese: 魔法幻影; foaled 9 May 2006) is a German-bred, Hong Kong–based retired racehorse. He was one of the nominees of 2010–2011 Hong Kong Horse of the Year.

== Background ==
Irian is a brown gelding bred in Germany by Gestut Schlenderhan. He is probably the best offspring of his sire, the German Group Three winner Tertullian.

== Racing career ==
Irian was sent into training with J Hirschberger in Germany, where he raced as a three-year-old in 2009. He won three races, including the Dr. Busch-Memorial and the Mehl-Mülhens-Rennen.

In 2010, Irian resumed his career in Hong Kong, racing at Sha Tin Racecourse. In November 2010, he defeated 10 opponents to win the Jockey Club Cup. He has run notably in defeat, finishing second in the Hong Kong Cup in both 2010 (to Snow Fairy) and 2011 (to California Memory).
