= Mehl-Mülhens-Rennen =

Flat horse race in Germany

Mehl-Mülhens-Rennen (German 2,000 Guineas)
- Class: Group 2
- Location: Weidenpesch Racecourse; Cologne, Germany
- Inaugurated: 1871
- Race type: Flat / Thoroughbred
- Website: Köln-Weidenpesch

Race information
- Distance: 1,600 metres (1 mile)
- Surface: Turf
- Track: Right-handed
- Qualification: Three-year-olds excluding geldings
- Weight: 58 kg Allowances; 1½ kg for fillies
- Purse: €153,000 (2022); 1st: €100,000

Mehl-Mülhens-Rennen
2025
Matilda	Ciaran	Dhitjari

Previous years
2024
Devil's Point	Penalty	Ghorgan
2023
Angers	Finn's Charm	Dhangadhi
2022
Maljoom	Rocchigiani	Georgios
2021
Mythico	Best Lightning	Best Of Lips

2020-2011
2020
Fearless King	Rubaiyat	Santurin
2019
Fox Champion	Arctic Sound	Great Scot
2018
Ancient Spirit	Fajjaj	Fighting Irish
2017
Poetic Dream	Lockheed	Empire Of The Star
2016
Knife Edge	Degas	Noor Al Hawa
2015
Karpino	Fanciful Angel	Molly Le Clou
2014
Lucky Lion	Nordico	Stillman
2013
Peace At Last	Global Bang	Tawhid
2012
Caspar Netscher	Amarillo	Red Duke
2011
Excelebration	Gereon	Acadius

2010-2001
2010
Frozen Power	Kite Hunter	Noble Alpha
2009
Irian	Zafisio	Globus
2008
Precious Boy	Konig Concorde	Liang Kay
2007
Aviso	Molly Max	Champery
2006
Royal Power	Aspectus	Lord Of England
2005
Santiago	Johnny Jumpup	Arrow
2004
Brunel	Lazio	Assiun

The Mehl-Mülhens-Rennen is a Group 2 flat horse race in Germany open to three-year-old thoroughbred colts and fillies. It is run at Cologne over a distance of 1,600 metres (about 1 mile), every year in May.

It is Germany's equivalent of the 2,000 Guineas Stakes, a famous race in England.

== History ==
The event was established in 1871, and it was originally held at Hoppegarten as the Henckel-Rennen. It was named after the Henckel von Donnersmarck family. It was initially contested over 2,000 metres, and it was shortened to 1,600 metres in 1904. It was staged at Grunewald from 1918 to 1922, and it returned to Hoppegarten in 1923.

The race was abandoned in 1945 and 1946, and in the period thereafter it took place at Düsseldorf (1947), Cologne (1948) and Dortmund (1949). It was transferred to Gelsenkirchen in 1950.

The present system of race grading was introduced in Germany in 1972, and the Henckel-Rennen was classed at Group 2 level.

The event was moved to Cologne and renamed the Mehl-Mülhens-Rennen in 1986. It was named in memory of Maria Mehl-Mülhens (died 1985), a long-time owner of Gestüt Röttgen, a successful stud farm near Cologne.

== Records ==
Leading jockey (6 wins)
Otto Schmidt – Lentulus (1922), Augias (1923), Favor (1925), Aurelius (1926), Effendi (1942), Neckar (1951)
Leading trainer (10 wins)
George Arnull – Monfalcone (1924), Alba (1930), Widerhall (1932), Sturmvogel (1935), Walzerkönig (1936), Orgelton (1938), Wehr Dich (1939), Magnat (1941), Aubergine (1949), Asterios (1950)
Leading owner (18+ wins)
Gestüt Schlenderhan – Dorn (1892), Real Scotch (1904), Prunus (1918), Monfalcone (1924), Alba (1930), Widerhall (1932), Sturmvogel (1935), Walzerkönig (1936), Orgelton (1938), Wehr Dich (1939), Magnat (1941), Aubergine (1949), Asterios (1950), Allasch (1953), Lombard (1970), Swazi (1976), Aviso (2007), Irian (2009)

== Winners since 1968 ==
Year	Winner	Jockey	Trainer	Owner	Time
1968	Literat	Oskar Langner	Sven von Mitzlaff	Gestüt Fährhof	1:46.60
1969	Hitchcock	Fritz Drechsler	Heinz Jentzsch	Karl-Heinz Münchow	1:44.90
1970	Lombard	Fritz Drechsler	Heinz Jentzsch	Gestüt Schlenderhan	1:42.30
1971	Widschi	Ron Hutchinson	Theo Grieper	Gestüt Röttgen	1:44.10
1972	Caracol	Oskar Langner	Sven von Mitzlaff	Gestüt Fährhof	1:36.70
1973	Flotow	A. J. Reid	Arthur-Paul Schlaefke	Mrs W. Richter	1:36.50
1974	Lord Udo	Edward Hide	Theo Grieper	Gestüt Röttgen	1:37.50
1975	Kronenkranich	Harro Remmert	Sven von Mitzlaff	Stall Moritzberg	1:38.10
1976	Swazi	Joan Pall	Heinz Jentzsch	Gestüt Schlenderhan	1:38.50
1977	Ziethen	Dave Richardson	Theo Grieper	Stall Moritzberg	1:43.10
1978	Limbo	Georg Bocskai	Oskar Langner	Stall Ittlingen	1:40.80
1979	Königsstuhl	Peter Alafi	Sven von Mitzlaff	Gestüt Zoppenbroich	1:41.70
1980	Wauthi	Heinz-Peter Ludewig	Theo Grieper	Gestüt Röttgen	1:37.70
1981	Orofino	Peter Alafi	Sven von Mitzlaff	Gestüt Zoppenbroich	1:41.10
1982	Tombos	Georg Bocskai	Heinz Jentzsch	Gestüt Fährhof	1:42.10
1983	Nandino	Bruce Raymond	Heinz Hesse	Gestüt Etzean	1:46.50
1984	Soto Grande	Peter Remmert	Adolf Wöhler	Stall Margarethe	1:40.60
1985	Lirung	Georg Bocskai	Heinz Jentzsch	Gestüt Fährhof	1:39.50
1986	Philipo	Dave Richardson	Hartmut Steguweit	Stall Surinam	1:36.30
1987	Kondor	José Orihuel	Hein Bollow	Ilse Ramm	1:37.20
1988	Alkalde	Manfred Hofer	Peter Lautner	Gerda Poorten	1:35.80
1989	Turfkönig	Olaf Schick	Uwe Ostmann	Günter Merkel	1:36.18
1990	Mandelbaum	Alan Freeman	Uwe Ostmann	Stall Steigenberger	1:37.10
1991	Flying Brave	John Reid	John Dunlop	Aubrey Ison	1:37.88
1992	Platini (Note: Alhijaz finished first in 1992, but he was relegated to fourth place following a stewards' inquiry)	Mark Rimmer	Bruno Schütz	Stall Steigenberger	1:36.31
1993	Kornado	Andre Best	Bruno Schütz	Stall Granum	1:36.39
1994	Royal Abjar	Willie Ryan	Andreas Wöhler	Jaber Abdullah	1:33.17
1995	Manzoni	Torsten Mundry	Andreas Wöhler	Gestüt Hof Heidendom	1:33.71
1996	Lavirco	Torsten Mundry	Peter Rau	Gestüt Fährhof	1:39.85
1997	Air Express	Brett Doyle	Clive Brittain	Mohamed Obaida	1:36.75
1998	Tiger Hill	Billy Newnes	Peter Schiergen	Georg von Ullmann	1:33.85
1999	Sumitas	Andreas Suborics	Peter Schiergen	Georg von Ullmann	1:36.25
2000	Pacino	Paul Eddery	Saeed bin Suroor	Godolphin	1:36.12
2001	Royal Dragon	Andrasch Starke	Andreas Schütz	Gestüt Park Wiedingen	1:34.89
2002	Dupont	Darryll Holland	William Haggas	Wentworth Racing Ltd	1:34.32
2003	Martillo	William Mongil	Ralf Suerland	Gestüt Höny-Hof	1:39.62
2004	Brunel	Darryll Holland	William Haggas	Highclere X	1:36.30
2005	Santiago	Andreas Boschert	Uwe Ostmann	Gestüt Hof Vesterberg	1:41.31
2006	Royal Power	Chris Catlin	Mick Channon	Jaber Abdullah	1:38.04
2007	Aviso	Terence Hellier	Jens Hirschberger	Gestüt Schlenderhan	1:36.68
2008	Precious Boy	Adrie de Vries	Waldemar Hickst	Gestüt Park Wiedingen	1:37.13
2009	Irian	Filip Minařík	Jens Hirschberger	Gestüt Schlenderhan	1:35.87
2010	Frozen Power	Frankie Dettori	Mahmood Al Zarooni	Godolphin	1:36.69
2011	Excelebration	Adam Kirby	Marco Botti	Giuliano Manfredini	1:36.20
2012	Caspar Netscher	Shane Kelly	Alan McCabe	Charles Wentworth	1:34.40
2013	Peace at Last	Fabrice Veron	Henri-Alex Pantall	Guy Heald	1:36.08
2014	Lucky Lion	Ioritz Mendizabal	Andreas Lowe	Gestut Winterhauch	1:35.17
2015	Karpino	Oisin Murphy	Andreas Wöhler	Pearl Bloodstock Ltd	1:34.01
2016	Knife Edge	Ryan Moore	Marco Botti	Magnier / Tabor / Smith	1:34.33
2017	Poetic Dream	Eduardo Pedroza	Andreas Wöhler	Jaber Abdullah	1:34.83
2018	Ancient Spirit	Filip Minařík	Jean-Pierre Carvalho	Stall Ullmann	1:34.98
2019	Fox Champion	Oisin Murphy	Richard Hannon Jr.	King Power Racing Co Ltd	1:37.87
2020	Fearless King (Note: The 2020 race was run in June due to the COVID-19 pandemic in Germany)	Rene Piechulek	Sarah Steinberg	Stall Salzburg	1:34.85
2021	Mythico	Rene Pechulek	Jean-Pierre Carvalho	Stall TMB	1:36.63
2022	Maljoom	Stevie Donohoe	William Haggas	Ahmed Al Maktoum	1:35.85
2023	Angers (Note: The 2023 winner Angers was later exported to Hong Kong and renamed Young Achiever)	Andrea Atzeni	Mario Baratti	Uranie Sarl, Pegase Bloodstock Et Al	1:33.83
2024	Devil's Point (IRE)	Silvestre De Sousa	David Menuisier	Clive Washbourne	1:35.08
2025	Matilda	Frida Valle Skar	Yasmin Almenrader	V Kaufling	1:33.89
2026	Title Role	Sean Levey	Simon & Ed Crisford	Smith / Magnier / Tabor	1:34.33

== Earlier winners ==
- 1871: Bauernfänger
- 1872: Seemann
- 1873: Zwietracht
- 1874: Herzog
- 1875: Waisenknabe
- 1876: Templer
- 1877: Zützen
- 1878: Lateran
- 1879: Goldfisch
- 1880: Tschungatai
- 1881: Blue Monkey
- 1882: Trachenberg
- 1883: Ghibelline
- 1884: Souvenir
- 1885: Andernach
- 1886: Potrimpos
- 1887: Tausendkünstler
- 1888: Padischah
- 1889: Anarch
- 1890: Nickel
- 1891: Peter
- 1892: Dorn
- 1893: Königswinter
- 1894: Herold
- 1895: Nixnutz
- 1896: Dahlmann
- 1897: Argwohn
- 1898: Altgold
- 1899: Missouri
- 1900: Griffin
- 1901: Regenwolke
- 1902: Frodi
- 1903: Bengali
- 1904: Real Scotch
- 1905: Inverno
- 1906: Fels
- 1907: Fabula
- 1908: Horizont
- 1909: Fervor
- 1910: Micado
- 1911: Moenus
- 1912: Flagge
- 1913: Csardas
- 1914: Terminus
- 1915: Antinous
- 1916: Taucher
- 1917: Landgraf
- 1918: Prunus
- 1919: Eckstein
- 1920: Pallenberg
- 1921: König Midas
- 1922: Lentulus
- 1923: Augias
- 1924: Monfalcone
- 1925: Favor
- 1926: Aurelius
- 1927: Torero
- 1928: Contessa Maddalena
- 1929: Wilfried
- 1930: Alba
- 1931: Sichel
- 1932: Widerhall
- 1933: Cassius
- 1934: Pelopidas
- 1935: Sturmvogel
- 1936: Walzerkönig
- 1937: Iniga Isolani
- 1938: Orgelton
- 1939: Wehr Dich
- 1940: Newa
- 1941: Magnat
- 1942: Effendi
- 1943: Granatwerfer
- 1944: Poet
- 1945–46: no race
- 1947: Nebelwerfer
- 1948: Ostermorgen
- 1949: Aubergine
- 1950: Asterios
- 1951: Neckar
- 1952: Mangon
- 1953: Allasch
- 1954: Atatürk
- 1955: König Ottokar
- 1956: Kilometer
- 1957: Orsini
- 1958: Pfalzteufel
- 1959: Waidmann
- 1960: Wiener Walzer
- 1961: Orlog
- 1962: Herero
- 1963: Mercurius
- 1964: Dschingis Khan
- 1965: Fioravanti
- 1966: Krawall
- 1967: Presto

== See also ==
- List of German flat horse races
