= Jack Mitchell (jockey) =

British jockey (born 1989)

Personal information
- Born: 1989 (age 36–37) Epsom
- Occupation: Jockey

Horse racing career
- Sport: Horse racing

Major racing wins
- Grosser Preis von Baden (2026); German 1000 Guineas (2026)

Significant horses
- Saddadd

Jack Mitchell is a Group 1 winning English jockey who competes in Flat racing.

== Background ==
Mitchell comes from a racing background. His father, Philip Mitchell, is a former trainer and five times champion amateur jockey. His older half-brother Guy Mitchell and younger brother Freddie Mitchell are both amateur jockeys. Older half-sister Holly has also ridden in a few races. Mitchell's grandfather, Cyril Mitchell, was a jump jockey and then a trainer. Growing up in Epsom, where his father had a training yard, Mitchell was taught to ride by his mother, Patricia, and competed in the Shetland Grand National series.

== Racing career ==
Mitchell's first winner was Wild Pitch, trained by his father, in a race for amateur jockeys at Newmarket on 22 July 2005. After serving his apprenticeship with Chris Wall in Newmarket, he moved to the yard of Michael Jarvis and remained there when Roger Varian took over. He secured his first Group race win on Premio Loco, trained by Chris Wall, in the Criterion Stakes on 26 June 2010 on the July Course at Newmarket.

In 2011, Mitchell received a six-month ban after testing positive for cocaine. His career then stalled, with only four winners in 2012 and in 2013, but began to pick up again in 2014 with fourteen winners. He achieved his first century of winners in 2020. He had his first Royal Ascot win in 2023, on Royal Champion, trained by Roger Varian in the Wolferton Stakes.

Mitchell rode his 1,000th winner in Britain in April 2025. On 31 May 2026, he won the Group 2 German 1,000 Guineas on Timeforshowcasing, trained by Charlie Johnston. Saddadd, trained by Roger Varian, provided Mitchell with his first Group 1 Victory when winning the Grosser Preis von Baden on 6 September 2026.

== Personal life ==
Mitchell is married and has children. In 2026, he passed his exams to obtain a pilot's licence.

== Major wins ==
- Grosser Preis von Baden - (1) - Saddadd (2026)
