= Grosser Preis der Landeshauptstadt Düsseldorf =

- Class: Group 3
- Location: Düsseldorf Racecourse; Düsseldorf, Germany
- Inaugurated: 1918
- Race type: Flat / Thoroughbred
- Website: Düsseldorf

Race information
- Distance: 1,700 metres (1m 99y)
- Surface: Turf
- Track: Right-handed
- Qualification: Three-years-old and up
- Weight: 56½ kg (3yo); 58 kg (4yo+); Allowances; 1½ kg for fillies and mares Penalties; 3 kg for Group 1 winners * 2 kg for Group 2 winners * 1 kg for Group 3 winners * * since January 1
- Purse: €55,000 (2012); 1st: €32,000

The Grosser Preis der Landeshauptstadt Düsseldorf is a Group 3 flat horse race in Germany open to thoroughbreds aged three years or older. It is run at Düsseldorf over a distance of 1,700 metres (1 mile and 99 yards), annually in October.

== Records ==
Most successful horse (3 wins):

- Lombard – 1971, 1972, 1973
- Peppercorn – 2000, 2001, 2004

Leading jockey (4 wins):

- Max Schmidt – Kameradschaftler (1938), Osterglaube (1941), Lockfalke (1942), Patrizier (1944)
- Hein Bollow – Asterios (1951), Jonkheer (1953), Optimus (1958), Kaiseradler (1962)
- Peter Alafi – Opponent (1966), Königsstuhl (1981), Orofino (1982), Mister Rocks (1983)

Leading trainer (8 wins):

- Heinz Jentzsch – Pantheon (1964), Lombard (1971, 1972, 1973), Arratos (1974), Whip It Quick (1976), Zampano (1987), Risen Raven (1994)

(note: the trainers of some of the early winners are unknown)

== Winners since 1970 ==
Year	Winner	Age	Jockey	Trainer	Time
1970	Norfolk	6	Peter Remmert	Sven von Mitzlaff	2:31.50
1971	Lombard	4	Horst Horwart	Heinz Jentzsch	2:31.40
1972	Lombard	5	Fritz Drechsler	Heinz Jentzsch	2:39.90
1973	Lombard	6	Fritz Drechsler	Heinz Jentzsch	2:31.90
1974	Arratos	5	Joan Pall	Heinz Jentzsch	2:31.70
1975	Lord Udo	4	Edward Hide	Theo Grieper	2:29.10
1976	Whip It Quick	4	Joan Pall	Heinz Jentzsch	2:30.40
1977	Windwurf	5	Geoff Lewis	Heinz Gummelt	2:33.50
1978	Gimont	5	Raimund Prinzinger	Georg Zuber	2:29.50
1979	Rodaun	4	Steve Cauthen	Herbert Block	2:16.30
1980	Nebos	4	Lutz Mäder	Hein Bollow	2:16.70
1981	Königsstuhl	5	Peter Alafi	Sven von Mitzlaff	2:16.50
1982	Orofino	4	Peter Alafi	Sven von Mitzlaff	2:17.90
1983	Mister Rocks	5	Peter Alafi	Sven von Mitzlaff	1:47.00
1984	Nandino	4	Wilfried Kujath	Antonio Aiello	1:44.40
1985	Young Runaway	3	Greville Starkey	Guy Harwood	1:46.60
1986	Eve's Error	3	Walter Swinburn	Michael Stoute	1:43.50
1987	Zampano	3	Andrzej Tylicki	Heinz Jentzsch	1:43.40
1988	Seratino	5	Olaf Schick	Uwe Ostmann	1:50.00
1989	Royal Touch	4	Willie Ryan	John Hammond	1:49.45
1990	Zille	5	Peter Schiergen	Jutta Schultheis	1:51.10
1991	Redden Burn	3	Willie Ryan	Henry Cecil	1:48.29
1992	Lucky Lindy	3	Brian Rouse	Richard Hannon, Sr.	1:45.13
1993	Port Lucaya	3	Frankie Dettori	Richard Hannon, Sr.	1:49.60
1994	Risen Raven	3	Peter Schiergen	Heinz Jentzsch	1:46.12
1995	Tres Heureux	5	L. Hammer-Hansen	Erika Mäder	1:49.45
1996	Village Storm	6	Terence Hellier	Søren Jensen	1:47.80
1997	Crimson Tide	3	Michael Hills	John Hills	1:47.35
1998	Tres Heureux	8	Georg Bocskai	Erika Mäder	1:51.19
1999	Page's King	4	Alessandro Schikora	Waldemar Himmel	1:47.00
2000	Peppercorn	3	Pascal van de Keere	Uwe Ostmann	1:47.98
2001	Peppercorn	4	Torsten Mundry	Uwe Ostmann	1:51.28
2002	Love Regardless	3	Keith Dalgleish	Mark Johnston	1:46.45
2003	Medici	3	Jean-Pierre Carvalho	Mario Hofer	1:48.70
2004	Peppercorn	7	Peter Heugl	Uwe Ostmann	1:45.21
2005	Common World	6	Robert Burke	Tom Hogan	1:45.05
2006	Wiesenpfad	3	Andreas Suborics	Waldemar Hickst	1:47.41
2007	Mharadono	4	Wladimir Panov	Peter Hirschberger	1:46.45
2008	Apollo Star	6	Stéphane Pasquier	Lenka Horakova	1:43.22
2009	Schützenjunker	4	Daniele Porcu	Uwe Ostmann	1:46.80
2010	Alianthus	5	Adrie de Vries	Jens Hirschberger	1:44.34
2011	Alianthus	6	Filip Minarik	Jens Hirschberger	1:45.56
2012	King's Hall	4	Andrasch Starke	Andreas Wöhler	1:48.86
2013	Zazou	6	Alexander Pietsch	Waldemar Hickst	1:42.04
2014	Flamingo Star	4	Stephen Hellyn	Waldemar Hickst	1:45.09
2015	Queenie	5	Stephen Hellyn	Markus Klug	1:42.98
2016	Noor Al Hawa	3	Eduardo Pedroza	Andreas Wohler	1:45.20
2017	Millowitsch	4	Andreas Helfenbein	Markus Klug	1:47.59
2018	Peace in Motion	4	Anthony Crastus	Waldemar Hickst	1:41.55
2019	Kronprinz	4	Lukas Delozier	Peter Schiergen	1:46.55
2020	Wonnemond	7	Dennis Schiergen	Sascha Smrczek	1:45.06
2021	Marshmallow	4	Adrie de Vries	Peter Schiergen	1:45.09
2022	Aemilianus	3	Andrasch Starke	Markus Klug	1:45.08
2023	Brave Emperor	3	Luke Morris	Archie Watson	1:41.68
2024	Best Lightning	6	Adrie de Vries	Andreas Suborics	1:43.17
2025	Short Final	5	Marco Ghiani	Stuart Williams	1:43.03

== Earlier winners ==
- 1918: Gisela
- 1919: Eleganz
- 1920–21: no race
- 1922: Siebenschläfer
- 1923: Leichtsinn
- 1924: Freizeit
- 1925: Freigeist
- 1926: Sonnenblümchen
- 1927: Nobelmann
- 1928: Piemont
- 1929: Linz
- 1930: Stalheck
- 1931: Gebt Feuer / Volumnius *
- 1932: Audi
- 1933: Volumnius
- 1934: Palander
- 1935: Ideolog
- 1936: Heimfahrt / Perlfischer *
- 1937: Kameradschaftler
- 1938: Kameradschaftler
- 1939: Barsdorf
- 1940: no race
- 1941: Osterglaube
- 1942: Lockfalke
- 1943: Flying Call
- 1944: Patrizier
- 1945: no race
- 1946: Berggeist
- 1947: Olymp
- 1948: Nebelwerfer
- 1949: Nebelwerfer
- 1950: Treiber
- 1951: Asterios
- 1952: Schütze
- 1953: Jonkheer
- 1954: Mangon
- 1955: Stani
- 1956: Masetto
- 1957: Traumgeist
- 1958: Optimus
- 1959: Pfalzteufel
- 1960: Waidmann
- 1961: Windbruch
- 1962: Kaiseradler
- 1963: Windbruch
- 1964: Pantheon
- 1965: Mercurius
- 1966: Opponent
- 1967: Birgitz
- 1968: Birgitz
- 1969: Ballyboy

* The 1931 and 1936 races were dead-heats and have joint winners.

== See also ==
- List of German flat horse races
- Recurring sporting events established in 1918 – this race is included under its former title, Grosser Preis von Düsseldorf.
