= Silberne Peitsche =

- Class: Group 3
- Location: Munich Racecourse; Munich, Germany
- Race type: Flat / Thoroughbred
- Sponsor: Bethmann Bank
- Website: Munich

Race information
- Distance: 1,300 metres (6½f)
- Surface: Turf
- Track: Left-handed
- Qualification: Three-years-old and up
- Weight: 54½ kg (3yo); 60 kg (4yo+); Allowances; 1½ kg for fillies and mares
- Purse: €55,000 (2012); 1st: €32,000

The Silberne Peitsche is a Group 3 flat horse race in Germany open to thoroughbreds aged three years or older. It is run over a distance of 1,300 metres (about 6½ furlongs) at Munich in late April or early May.

== History ==
The event was formerly run at Gelsenkirchen, and it used to be held in August. For a period it was contested over 1,400 metres. It was given Listed status in 1983.

The race was extended to 1,450 metres in 1998. It was cut to 1,200 metres in 2000.

The Silberne Peitsche was transferred to Cologne in 2002. It was promoted to Group 3 level and increased to 1,300 metres in 2007. It was moved to the spring in 2010.

The race was switched to Munich in 2012. In 2014 the Silberne Peitsche is part of the Goldene Peitsche series. The winner of the race gets an invitation to take part in the Goldene Peitsche held in August in Baden-Baden. It was moved to the Baden-Baden spring festival in later May or early June in 2016.

== Records ==
Most successful horse (2 wins):

- Pentathlon – 1967, 1968
- Zünftiger – 1983, 1984
- Wondras – 1990, 1991
- Contat – 2009, 2010
- Shining Emerald – 2015, 2016
- Namos - 2019, 2020

Leading jockey (6 wins):

- Peter Remmert – Campanile (1961), Naretha (1963), Gegenwind (1969), Iffland (1978, div. ii), Aspros (1981), Zünftiger (1984)

Leading trainer (5 wins):

- Heinz Jentzsch – Erdball (1962), Dschingis Khan (1965), Akbar (1975), Colatina (1976), Esclavo (1980)

== Winners since 1980 ==
Year	Winner	Age	Jockey	Trainer	Time
1980	Esclavo	4	Ralf Suerland	Heinz Jentzsch	1:24.50
1981	Aspros	4	Peter Remmert	Theo Grieper	1:22.30
1982	Mister Rocks	4	Peter Alafi	Sven von Mitzlaff	1:23.40
1983	Zünftiger	5	Lutz Mäder	Hein Bollow	1:21.80
1984	Zünftiger	6	Peter Remmert	Hein Bollow	1:20.50
1985	Smaragd	3	Erwin Schindler	Adolf Wöhler	1:27.50
1986	Onesto	4	Kevin Woodburn	Friedrich W. Schlaefke	1:23.60
1987	Germinal	5	Peter Alafi	Harro Remmert	1:26.00
1988	Garde a Vous	3	Andreas Boschert	Peter Lautner	1:22.70
1989	Feenpark	4	Ralf Malinowski	Herbert Cohn	1:23.40
1990	Wondras	5	Peter Bloomfield	Theo Grieper	1:22.60
1991	Wondras	6	Peter Bloomfield	Theo Grieper	1:27.10
1992	Calypso Reef	6	Andre Best	Søren Jensen	1:25.20
1993	Montepulciano	4	Georg Bocskai	Peter Rau	1:24.40
1994	Hever Golf Rose	3	Jason Weaver	Joe Naughton	1:28.64
1995	Branston Abby	6	Michael Roberts	Mark Johnston	1:27.00
1996	Personal Love	3	Andre Best	Horst Steinmetz	1:27.46
1997	Barlovento	4	Georg Bocskai	Uwe Ostmann	1:26.73
1998	Gaelic Symphony	5	Andreas Suborics	Mario Hofer	1:27.00
1999	Catoki	6	Peter Heugl	Peter Lautner	1:31.40
2000	Kaka	5	Jean-Pierre Carvalho	Mario Hofer	1:10.40
2001	Shawdon	6	L. Hammer-Hansen	Nils Lindgren	1:12.30
2002	König Shuffle	6	Adrie de Vries	Martin Rölke	1:12.10
2003	Call Me Big	5	Andrasch Starke	Eckhart Gröschel	1:11.00
2004	Glad to Be Fast	4	Andrasch Starke	Mario Hofer	1:11.90
2005	Diable	6	Adrie de Vries	Heinz Hesse	1:15.80
2006	Polish Magic	6	Eduardo Pedroza	Andreas Wöhler	1:10.00
2007	Lucky Strike	9	Adrie de Vries	Andreas Trybuhl	1:16.19
2008	Abbadjinn	4	Torsten Mundry	Peter Rau	1:19.71
2009	Contat	6	Rastislav Juracek	Pavel Vovcenko	1:17.91
2010	Contat	7	Rastislav Juracek	Pavel Vovcenko	1:17.27
2011	Amico Fritz	5	Maxime Guyon	Henri-Alex Pantall	1:17.84
2012	Smooth Operator	6	Stefanie Hofer	Mario Hofer	1:16.19
2013	Arnold Lane	4	Sam Hitchcott	Mick Channon	1:15.56
2014	Amarillo	5	Mr Dennis Schiergen	Peter Schiergen	1:18.04
2015	Shining Emerald	4	Eduardo Pedroza	Andreas Wöhler	1:23.91
2016	Shining Emerald	5	Eduardo Pedroza	Andreas Wöhler	1:11.12
2017	Artistica	3	Wladimir Panow	Dominik Moser	1:07.83
2018	Millowitsch	5	Andreas Helfenbein	Markus Klug	1:10.50
2019	Namos	3	Wladimir Panow	Dominik Moser	1:08.32
2020	Namos	4	Wladimir Panow	Dominik Moser	1:11.04
2021	Majestic Colt (Note: The 2021 race was run at Cologne)	6	Eduardo Pedroza	Andreas Wöhler	1:16.46
2025	Kylian	4	Adrie de Vries	Archie Watson	1:06.38

== Earlier winners ==
- 1957: Fallott
- 1958: Orsini
- 1959: Esplanade
- 1960: Adlon
- 1961: Campanile
- 1962: Erdball
- 1963: Naretha
- 1964: Anatol
- 1965: Dschingis Khan
- 1966: Wirbel
- 1967: Pentathlon
- 1968: Pentathlon
- 1969: Gegenwind
- 1975: Akbar
- 1976: Colatina
- 1977: Sardica
- 1978: i) Llanero, ii) Iffland *
- 1979: Belle Fee

* The race was run in two separate divisions in 1978.

== See also ==
- List of German flat horse races
