= Billy Newnes =

British jockey

Personal information
- Born: 6 December 1959 (age 66) Liverpool
- Occupation: Jockey

Horse racing career
- Sport: Horse racing

Major racing wins
- Major races Champion Stakes (1982); Epsom Oaks (1982); Sun Chariot Stakes (1982); Deutsches Derby (1992)

Significant horses
- Time Charter

William Anthony Paul Newnes (born Liverpool, 6 December 1959) is an Epsom Oaks winning jockey, best known for his connection with the horse Time Charter, on which he won the Oaks, Sun Chariot Stakes and Champion Stakes in 1982. He was also Champion Apprentice the same season, with 57 winners.

Not long afterwards, in 1984, he was banned for three years for accepting £1,000 from professional gambler Harry Bardsley in return for information.

After his return, he won the 1989 Greenham Stakes on Zayyani, but spent much of the 1990s riding in Germany, where he won the Deutsches Derby in 1992 on Pik Konig. His last Group race victory was the Fruhjahrspreis des Bankhaus Metzler in Frankfurt on 22 Apr 2001 on Blue Baloo.

== Statistics by year (post-1988) ==
| Year | Wins | Runs | Strike rate | Total earnings |
|---|---|---|---|---|
| 1988 | 45 | 581 | 8 | £335,261 |
| 1989 | 41 | 548 | 7 | £319,495 |
| 1990 | 53 | 588 | 9 | £378,792 |
| 1991 | 30 | 491 | 6 | £218,152 |
| 1992 | 27 | 340 | 8 | £110,002 |
| 1993 | 40 | 544 | 7 | £208,219 |
| 1994 | 33 | 439 | 8 | £205,431 |
| 1995 | 24 | 321 | 7 | £180,605 |
| 1996 | 1 | 7 | 14 | £4,262 |

== Major wins ==
(United Kingdom) Great Britain

- Champion Stakes - Time Charter (1982)
- Epsom Oaks - Time Charter (1982)
- Sun Chariot Stakes - Time Charter (1982)

Germany

- Deutsches Derby - Pik Konig (1992)
