= Success Brocken =

Japanese Thoroughbred racehorse (2005–2022)

Success Brocken サクセスブロッケン
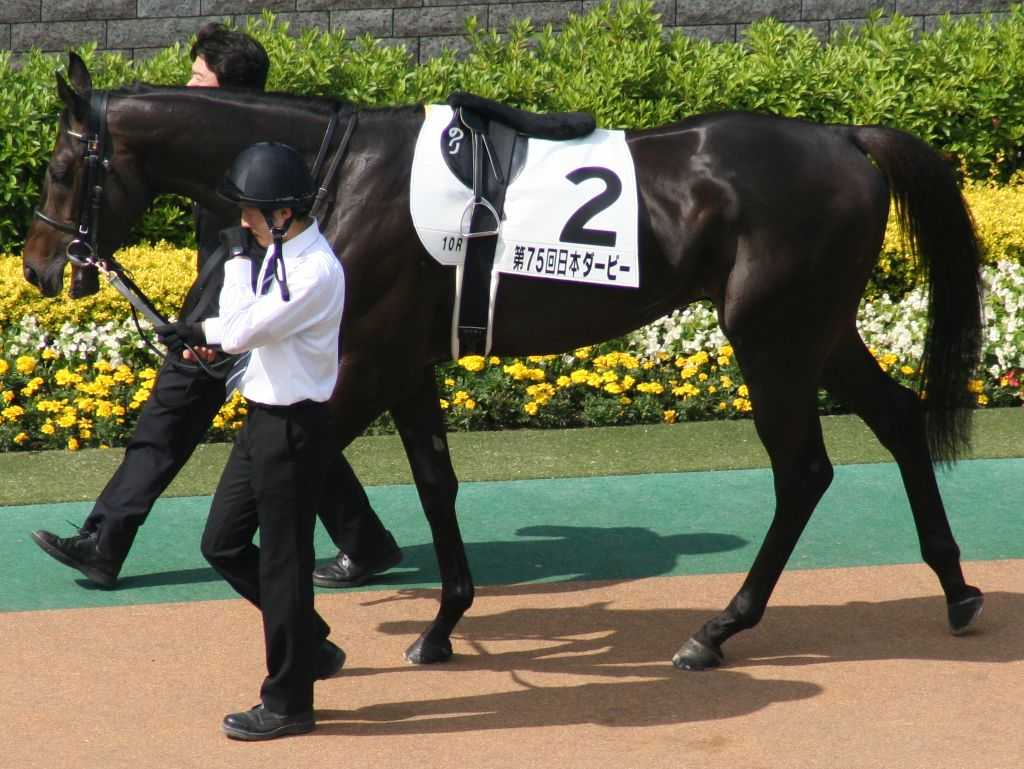
- Success Brocken at the 2008 Satsuki Shō
- Breed: Thoroughbred
- Sire: Symboli Kris S
- Grandsire: Kris S.
- Dam: Success Beauty
- Damsire: Sunday Silence
- Sex: Stallion
- Foaled: 5 May 2005
- Died: 22 December 2022 (aged 17)
- Country: Japan
- Color: Dark bay
- Breeder: Tanikawa Stud
- Owner: Tetsu Takashima
- Racing colours
- Trainer: Hideaki Fujiwara
- Jockey: Norihiro Yokoyama; Hiroyuki Uchida
- Record: 19: 7-2-3
- Earnings: ¥408,472,000

Major wins
- Japan Dirt Derby (2008); February Stakes (2009); Tokyo Daishōten (2009)

Success Brocken (Japanese: サクセスブロッケン, Hepburn: Sakusesu Burokken, 5 May 2005 – 22 December 2022) was a Japanese Thoroughbred racehorse active from 2007 until 2011. After winning the Japan Dirt Derby and February Stakes in 2008, he also went and won the Tokyo Daishōten in the following year. He had a total earnings of ¥408,472,000 before retiring.

== Background ==
Foaled by Success Beauty on 5 May 2005, Success Brocken was sired by Symboli Kris S, the winner of Autumn Tennō Shō and Arima Kinen in both 2002 and 2003, and was also the Japanese Horse of the Year in the same years.

He was foaled at the Tanikawa Stud, which is located in Hokkaido, Japan. He was named after the stable name - Success and the Brocken spectre - Brocken.

== Racing career ==
Success Brocken made his debut on 17th of November, 2007. Eiji Nakadate who was his jockey this time, took the lead from the start and extended his lead over the rest of the field in the straight, winning by a large margin of 3.1 seconds over the fourth favourite Kurino Kobu O. Into the new year, his jockey switched over to Norihiro Yokoyama. This switch worked wonders as he recorded three straight wins at the Kurochiku Sho, Hyacinth Stakes and Tango Stakes to remain undefeated This feat qualified him for the major classics in May, the Tokyo Yushun. He was the third favourite for the race but unfortunately, the race did not went well for him as he finished in the last place. Then, the horse pivoted back towards the dirt track, joined the Japan Dirt Derby in July. Sticking with Yokoyama this time, he rode the horse and tracked in the second position all the way before pulling away in the straight, beating the third favourite Smart Falcon by three and a half lengths to get his first graded race win. For the autumn campaign, Success Brocken restarted his season with a run at the Japan Breeding Farms' Cup Classic, carrying his five out of five form on the dirt races. In the race, Success Brocken ran well in the lead before Vermilion, jockeyed by Yutaka Take advanced from third position, overtook him near the line to win just by a neck. This lost affected his form at the end of the season when he finished in eighth place at the Japan Cup Dirt and third at the Tokyo Daishoten with the new jockey (Hiroyuki Uchida), both behind the returning Kane Hekili. Speaking about the losses he got at the end of the season, Yokoyama admitted that the horse was eager but lack of experience due to young age which became a hindrance for him. Regardless, he remained positive with the horse's future.

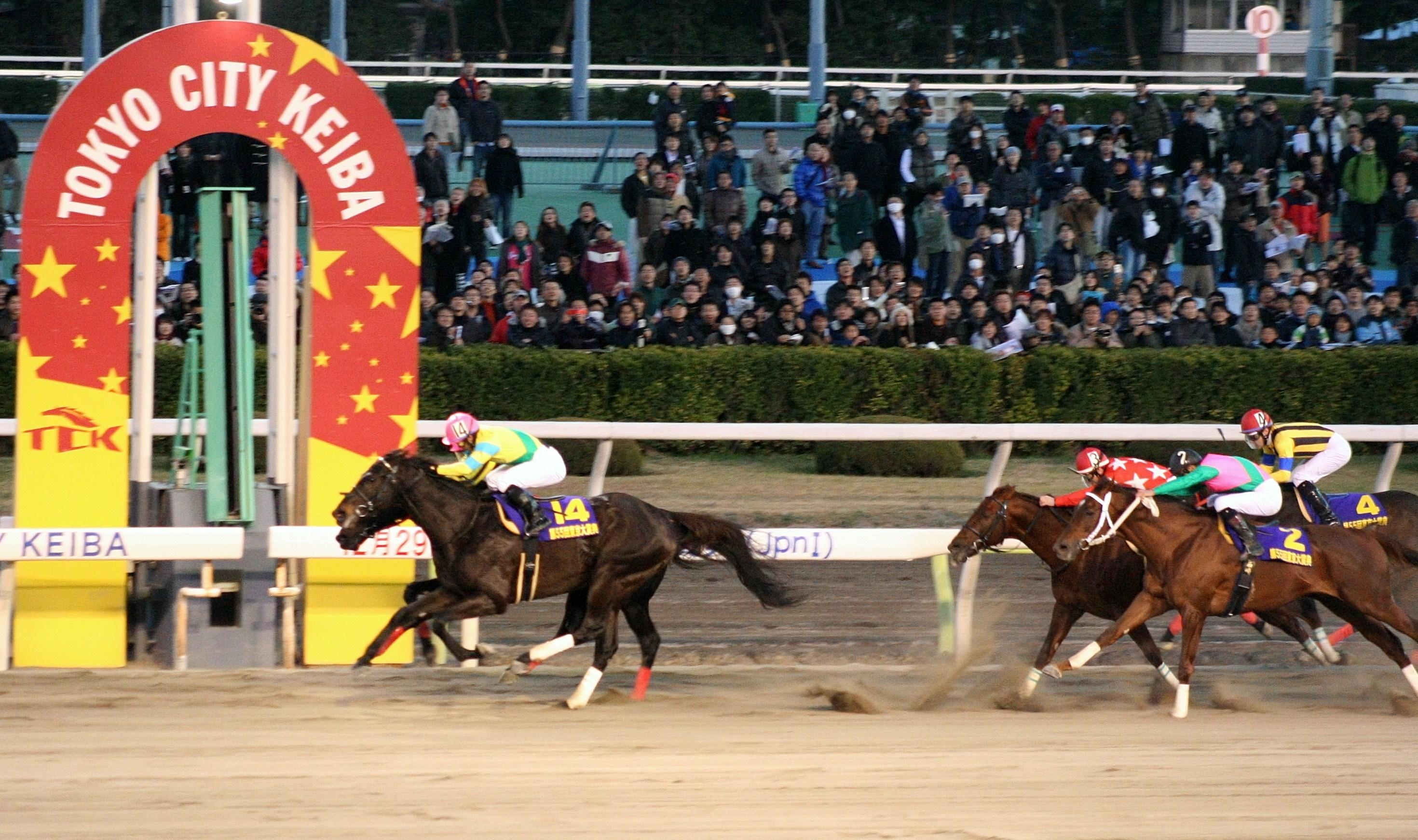
Success Brocken and Vermilion dueling to the line at the 55th Tokyo Daishoten in 2009

In 2009, Success Brocken started the season with a run at the Kawasaki Kinen with Uchida at the saddle. He managed to enter this race due to late withdrawal from Smart Falcon and Wonder Speed. When the race began, Uchida rode the horse well enough at the leading pack but lack of final speed caused them to finish in third place behind Kane Hekili and Furioso. The next race he participated was the February Stakes. At the beginning of this race, Espoir City took charge early on and lead for the majority of it. Entering the final straight, Success Brocken alongside Casino Drive and Kane Hekili chased down the leaders, and eventually overtook Espoir City, resulting in a three-way battle. With 50 meters to go, Success Brocken on the outside pulled away and crossed the finish line first, a neck ahead of Casino Drive. This win was his first JRA Grade 1 race win and also he broke the record by 0.1 seconds faster over Meisho Bowler, who set it back in 2005. After this race, he would be rested for eight months and only rejoined the season at the Mile Championship Nambu Hai in October. This race was considered not a good one for the horse despite hitting the podium as he finished in second place four lengths behind Espoir City who runaway with the win comfortably from the start. He was put on a reserve in the Japan Breeding Farms' Cup Classic this time around, ended up being scratched so his trainer, Fujiwara decided to try him at the Musashino Stakes. He got his worst finish on the dirt track this time, finishing tenth. Fujiwara claimed that he was struggled with his fitness and carrying a 59 kg load was too heavy at that day. He did better at his next race, the Japan Cup Dirt in which he placed fourth behind Espoir City, Silk Moebius and Wonder Acute. He closed the season with a second attempt at the Tokyo Daishoten. This time, he was the second favourite at 3.5 to 1 odds to win behind Vermilion, who got 2.6 to 1 odds. As the gate opened, Furioso bursted out early for the lead while Success Brocken and Vermilion tracked him down the stretch. In the straight, Vermilion pulled ahead first, and Success Brocken chased from the outside. With 100 meters to go, the two horses were neck and neck and crossed the finish line in a close battle. Success Brocken won by a nose, securing his third Grade 1 race victory. Uchida who was elated stated "I'm relieved that we were able to finish with a good result. When Christophe Lemaire (Vermilion's jockey) made his move, I thought we were done for, but I felt good about the horse's response, so I went for it in the final straight. I was disappointed last year (3rd place), so I'm really glad that we were able to get revenge."

When the new season kicked on, There was a plan for Success Brocken to go for the Dubai World Cup. As he failed to win at the February Stakes in which he only finished in third place, his trainer decided to pull the plug and focused on the domestic races which would be the Kashiwa Kinen. He finished in fourth place in this race and his form did not improve in the next Teio Sho as he finished in eighth-place at the line even though he took the lead for the majority of the race. After this race, he was rested and released to the pasture. Fujiwara said, "He seems to be accumulating fatigue from the tough races he's been in so far. I'd like to run him in the February Stakes, though." Seven months later, Success Brocken would be back at the Negishi Stakes in January as a preparation for the February Stakes. It was a crushing defeat as he finished way out of contention at 13th-place. Due to his struggling form and lack of fitness, Hideaki Fujiwara made a tough decision to retire him from racing. He was being deregistered on 3rd of February and assigned to be a riding horse at Tokyo Racecourse.

== Racing form ==
Success Brocken won nine races and struck podium five more times out of 19 starts. This data is available based on JBIS and netkeiba.

Date	Track	Race	Grade	Distance (Condition)	Entry	HN	Odds (Favored)	Finish	Time	Margins	Jockey	Winner (Runner-up)
2007 – two-year-old season
Nov 17	Fukushima	2yo Newcomer		1,700 m (Fast)	11	11	3.5 (2)	1st	R1:47.9 (Note: R indicated that it was a record time finish)	–3.1	Eiji Nakadate	(Kurino Kobu O)
2008 – three-year-old season
Jan 19	Nakayama	Kurochiku Sho	ALW (1W)	1,800 m (Fast)	16	3	1.9 (1)	1st	1:53.9	–0.6	Norihiro Yokoyama	(Courir Passion)
Feb 24	Tokyo	Hyacinth Stakes	OP	1,600 m (Fast)	11	9	1.5 (1)	1st	1:37.0	–0.7	Norihiro Yokoyama	(Daiwa Mach One)
May 3	Kyoto	Tango Stakes	OP	1,800 m (Fast)	15	8	1.4 (1)	1st	1:51.2	–0.9	Norihiro Yokoyama	(Ubiquitous)
Jun 1	Tokyo	Tokyo Yushun	GI	2,400 m (Firm)	18	2	8.3 (3)	18th	2:28.9	2.2	Norihiro Yokoyama	Deep Sky
Jul 9	Ohi	Japan Dirt Derby	JPN I (Note: All JPN graded race were labeled Listed (L) internationally)	2,000 m (Sloppy)	15	11	1.2 (1)	1st	2:04.5	–0.6	Norihiro Yokoyama	(Smart Falcon)
Nov 3	Sonoda	JBC Classic	JPN I	1,870 m (Fast)	12	1	2.2 (2)	2nd	1:56.8	0.1	Norihiro Yokoyama	Vermilion
Dec 7	Hanshin	Japan Cup Dirt	GI	1,800 m (Fast)	15	7	4.4 (2)	8th	1:49.9	0.7	Norihiro Yokoyama	Kane Hekili
Dec 29	Ohi	Tokyo Daishoten	JPN I	2,000 m (Fast)	10	8	5.6 (3)	3rd	2:05.0	0.5	Hiroyuki Uchida	Kane Hekili
2009 – four-year-old season
Jan 28	Kawasaki	Kawasaki Kinen	JPN I	2,100 m (Good)	13	2	4.9 (2)	3rd	2:14.0	0.7	Hiroyuki Uchida	Kane Hekili
Feb 22	Tokyo	February Stakes	GI	1,600 m (Good)	16	15	20.6 (6)	1st	R1:34.6	0.0	Hiroyuki Uchida	(Casino Drive)
Oct 12	Morioka	Mile Championship Nambu Hai	JPN I	1,600 m (Fast)	15	6	1.8 (1)	2nd	1:36.1	0.7	Hiroyuki Uchida	Espoir City
Nov 7	Tokyo	Musashino Stakes	GIII	1,600 m (Fast)	16	12	3.8 (1)	10th	1:36.4	0.9	Hiroyuki Uchida	Wonder Acute
Dec 6	Hanshin	Japan Cup Dirt	GI	1,800 m (Fast)	16	2	9.2 (4)	4th	1:50.7	0.8	Hiroyuki Uchida	Espoir City
Dec 29	Ohi	Tokyo Daishoten	JPN I	2,000 m (Fast)	14	14	2.9 (2)	1st	2:05.9	0.0	Hiroyuki Uchida	(Vermilion)
2010 – five-year-old season
Feb 21	Tokyo	February Stakes	GI	1,600 m (Fast)	15	6	6.4 (2)	3rd	1:35.9	1.0	Hiroyuki Uchida	Espoir City
May 5	Funabashi	Kashiwa Kinen	JPN I	1,600 m (Fast)	14	4	5.7 (2)	4th	1:37.9	1.1	Hiroyuki Uchida	Espoir City
Jun 30	Ohi	Teio Sho	JPN I	2,000 m (Good)	15	1	3.0 (1)	8th	2:05.2	1.8	Hiroyuki Uchida	Furioso
2011 – six-year-old season
Jan 30	Tokyo	Negishi Stakes	GIII	1,400 m (Fast)	16	12	12.3 (6)	13th	1:25.1	2.1	Hiroyuki Uchida	Sei Crimson

Legend:
Dirt Turf

== Retirement and death ==
When he retired, he was gelded and became a riding horse at the Tokyo Racecourse. He became a lead horse started from 2012. He was mostly assigned for the February Stakes which was the race he won back in 2009. In 2020, he became the lead horse of the Tokyo Yushun for the first time.

On 21st of February 2021, he retired from the lead horse assignment after leading the February Stakes for the last time. He was moved to a horse trust farm at Kagoshima where he lived out his remaining years as a retired horse.

Success Brocken died on 22nd of December, 2022. He was 17 years old.

== Pedigree ==
Pedigree of Success Brocken (JPN), 2005
Sire Symboli Kris S (USA) 1999	Kris S (USA); 1977	Roberto	Hail to Reason
Sire Symboli Kris S (USA) 1999	Kris S (USA); 1977	Roberto	Bramalea
Sire Symboli Kris S (USA) 1999	Kris S (USA); 1977	Sharp Queen	Princequillo
Sire Symboli Kris S (USA) 1999	Kris S (USA); 1977	Sharp Queen	Bridgework
Sire Symboli Kris S (USA) 1999	Tee Kay (USA); 1991	Gold Meridian	Seattle Slew
Sire Symboli Kris S (USA) 1999	Tee Kay (USA); 1991	Gold Meridian	Queen Louie
Sire Symboli Kris S (USA) 1999	Tee Kay (USA); 1991	Tee Argo	Tri Jet
Sire Symboli Kris S (USA) 1999	Tee Kay (USA); 1991	Tee Argo	Hail Proudly
Dam Success Beauty (JPN) 1999 FNo : 4-r	Sunday Silence (USA); 1986	Halo	Hail to Reason
Dam Success Beauty (JPN) 1999 FNo : 4-r	Sunday Silence (USA); 1986	Halo	Cosmah
Dam Success Beauty (JPN) 1999 FNo : 4-r	Sunday Silence (USA); 1986	Wishing Well	Understanding
Dam Success Beauty (JPN) 1999 FNo : 4-r	Sunday Silence (USA); 1986	Wishing Well	Mountain Flower
Dam Success Beauty (JPN) 1999 FNo : 4-r	Our Miss Legs (USA); 1993	Deputy Minister	Vice Regent
Dam Success Beauty (JPN) 1999 FNo : 4-r	Our Miss Legs (USA); 1993	Deputy Minister	Mint Copy
Dam Success Beauty (JPN) 1999 FNo : 4-r	Our Miss Legs (USA); 1993	Colonel Waters	Pleasant Colony
Dam Success Beauty (JPN) 1999 FNo : 4-r	Our Miss Legs (USA); 1993	Colonel Waters	Water Cress

- Success Brocken was an inbred by 4 x 4 x 5 to Hail to Reason (Water Cress's sire)
