= Gold Allure =

Japanese thoroughbred racehorse

Gold Allure; ゴールドアリュール
- Breed: Thoroughbred
- Sire: Sunday Silence
- Grandsire: Halo
- Dam: Nikiya
- Damsire: Nureyev
- Sex: Stallion
- Foaled: March 3, 1999
- Died: February 18, 2017 (aged 17); Abira, Hokkaido, Japan
- Country: Japan
- Color: Chestnut
- Breeder: Oiwake Farm
- Owner: Shadai Racehorse
- Racing colors
- Trainer: Yasuo Ikee
- Jockey: Yutaka Take
- Record: 16: 8-1-1
- Earnings: ¥410,376,000

Major wins
- Japan Dirt Derby (2002); Derby Grand Prix (2002); Tokyo Daishōten (2002); February Stakes (2003); Antares Stakes (2003)

Awards
- JRA Award for Best Dirt Horse (2002)
- Last updated on 15 March 2026

Gold Allure (Japanese: ゴールドアリュール, foaled March 3, 1999 – February 18, 2017) was a Japanese Thoroughbred racehorse, the winner of the 2003 February Stakes, and a breeding stallion.

== Background ==
Gold Allure was foaled out of Nikiya, who was the mare sired by Nureyev who raced in France and won 3 out of 8 starts. He was sired by the thirteen time leading sire in Japan, Sunday Silence who won Kentucky Derby and Preakness Stakes in 1989.

His name Gold Allure is a moniker of Golden Charm whereas the horses supposed to be so captivating in sight that it draws people in.

== Racing career ==
Gold Allure's first race was on November 11, 2001, at Kyoto where he came in 2nd place. He won his first race the following month also at Kyoto.

He picked up a pair of wins in April 2002, including a win at the Danno Stakes. He then qualified for his first Grade-1 race, which was the 2002 Tokyo Yūshun, where he came in 5th.

He got his first Grade-1 win when he won the July 4, 2002, Japan Dirt Derby. He then won another Grade-1 race when he won the Derby Grand Prix in September 2002.

He came in 5th at the November 2002 Champions Cup. He then won the December 29, 2002, Tokyo Daishōten to start a three-race win streak. At the end of the 2002 season, Gold Allure won the JRA Award for Best Dirt Horse by 149 votes out of 281 total.

He captured the 2003 February Stakes, then won the Antares Stakes on April 27. Gold Allure then ended his career with an 11th-place finish at the Teio Sho on June 25, 2003. Right after the race, he was sent to pastures and diagnosed with roaring sickness, which immediately worsened as time went by. By July 21, he would be retired from active racing.

== Racing form ==
Gold Allure won eight races out of 16 starts. This data is available based on JBIS and netkeiba.

Date	Track	Race	Grade	Distance (Condition)	Entry	HN	Odds (Favored)	Finish	Time	Margins	Jockey	Winner (Runner-up)
2001 – two-year-old season
Nov 11	Kyoto	2yo Newcomer		1,800 m (Firm)	13	7	5.3 (3)	2nd	1:48.3	0.1	Shigefumi Kumazawa	Yamanin Seraphim
Nov 25	Kyoto	2yo Newcomer		1,800 m (Firm)	9	3	1.4 (1)	1st	1:48.7	–0.2	Shigefumi Kumazawa	(Amphitryon)
Dec 23	Nakayama	Hopeful Stakes	OP	2,000 m (Firm)	15	7	1.9 (1)	4th	2:02.0	0.3	Yutaka Take	Tiger Cafe
2002 – three-year-old season
Jan 26	Kokura	Kusunoki Sho	ALW (1W)	1,800 m (Heavy)	14	6	2.2 (1)	3rd	1:53.2	0.4	Koichi Uchida	Takehana Opera
Feb 23	Nakayama	Suisen Sho	ALW (1W)	2,200 m (Firm)	16	12	5.0 (2)	5th	2:14.8	0.6	Hiroki Goto	Daddy's Dream
Mar 9	Hanshin	Yukiyanagi Sho	ALW (1W)	2,000 m (Firm)	13	10	3.6 (1)	4th	2:01.5	0.8	Shigefumi Kumazawa	Yu Carat
Apr 13	Hanshin	3yo Allowance	1W	1,800 m (Good)	14	9	4.5 (2)	1st	1:51.6	–0.7	Hiroyuki Uemura	(Meiner Divine)
Apr 27	Kyoto	Tango Stakes	OP	1,800 m (Fast)	13	7	2.4 (1)	1st	1:50.6	–0.7	Hiroyuki Uemura	(Kite Hill Wind)
May 26	Tokyo	Tokyo Yushun	I	2,400 m (Firm)	18	18	48.1 (13)	5th	2:26.5	0.3	Hiroyuki Uemura	Tanino Gimlet
Jul 4	Ohi	Japan Dirt Derby	JPN I	2,000 m (Good)	15	8	0.0 (1)	1st	2:04.1	–1.3	Yutaka Take	(Inter Taiyo)
Sep 23	Morioka	Derby Grand Prix	JPN I	2,000 m (Fast)	14	5	0.0 (1)	1st	2:08.1	–1.6	Yutaka Take	(Star King Man)
Nov 23	Nakayama	Japan Cup Dirt	I	1,800 m (Fast)	16	8	2.6 (2)	5th	1:52.6	0.4	Yutaka Take	Eagle Cafe
Dec 29	Ohi	Tokyo Daishoten	JPN I	2,000 m (Fast)	16	4	0.0 (1)	1st	2:05.6	–0.3	Yutaka Take	(Biwa Shinseiki)
2003 – four-year-old season
Feb 23	Nakayama	February Stakes	I	1,800 m (Good)	16	5	3.1 (1)	1st	1:50.9	–0.1	Yutaka Take	(Biwa Shinseiki)
Apr 27	Kyoto	Antares Stakes	III	1,800 m (Good)	16	9	1.4 (1)	1st	1:49.7	–1.3	Yutaka Take	(Eagle Cafe)
Jun 25	Ohi	Teio Sho	JPN I	2,000 m (Muddy)	15	11	0.0 (1)	11th	2:07.9	3.3	Yutaka Take	Name Value

Legend:
Dirt Turf

- All JPN graded races are labeled as Listed internationally

== Stud career ==
Gold Allure's descendants include:

c = colt, f = filly

Foaled	Name	Sex	Major Wins
2005	Espoir City	c	February Stakes, Champions Cup, Kashiwa Kinen, Miyako Stakes
2005	Oro Meister	c	Mile Championship Nambu Hai
2005	Take Mikazuchi	c	Lord Derby Challenge Trophy
2005	Smart Falcon	c	Tokyo Daishōten, Teio Sho, Diolite Kinen, Kawasaki Kinen
2006	Silk Fortune	c	Procyon Stakes, Negishi Stakes, Capella Stakes
2007	Terra the Cloud	c	Tokyo Kinen
2009	Hula Bride	f	Aichi Hai, Nakayama Himba Stakes
2010	Copano Rickey	c	February Stakes, Tokyo Daishōten, Japan Breeding farms' Cup Classic, Kashiwa Kinen
2010	Chrysolite	c	Japan Dirt Derby, Diolite Kinen, Nippon TV Hai
2010	Graceful Leap	c	Polaris Stakes, JBC Sprint, Hyogo Gold Trophy
2010	Meisho Sumitomo	c	Sirius Stakes
2011	Red Alvis	c	Unicorn Stakes
2012	Lalabel	f	JBC Ladies Classic, Shirasagi Sho, Rosita Kinen, Oka Sho
2012	Wish Happiness	c	Edelweiss Sho
2013	Gold Dream	c	Kashiwa Kinen, Teio Sho, February Stakes
2013	One Millionth	f	Empress Hai
2013	Suadela	c	Narashino Kiratto Sprint
2014	Iron Tailor	f	Queen Sho
2014	Epicharis	f	Hokkaido Nisai Yushun
2014	Step of Dance	f	Rosita Kinen, Jungfrau Sho
2014	Sunrise Nova	c	Mile Championship Nambu Hai, Unicorn Stakes
2015	Gold Patek	c	Laurel Sho
2016	Chrysoberyl	c	Japan Dirt Derby, Champions Cup, Teio Sho, Hyogo Championship, Nihon TV Hai
2016	Naran Huleg	c	Takamatsunomiya Kinen

== Pedigree ==
Pedigree of Gold Allure (JPN), 2015
Sire Sunday Silence (USA) b. 1986	Halo (USA) b. 1969	Hail to Reason	Turn-to
Sire Sunday Silence (USA) b. 1986	Halo (USA) b. 1969	Hail to Reason	Nothirdchance
Sire Sunday Silence (USA) b. 1986	Halo (USA) b. 1969	Cosmah	Cosmic Bomb
Sire Sunday Silence (USA) b. 1986	Halo (USA) b. 1969	Cosmah	Almahmoud
Sire Sunday Silence (USA) b. 1986	Wishing Well (USA) b. 1975	Understanding	Promised Land
Sire Sunday Silence (USA) b. 1986	Wishing Well (USA) b. 1975	Understanding	Pretty Ways
Sire Sunday Silence (USA) b. 1986	Wishing Well (USA) b. 1975	Mountain Flower	Montparnasse
Sire Sunday Silence (USA) b. 1986	Wishing Well (USA) b. 1975	Mountain Flower	Edelweiss
Dam Nikiya (USA) b. 1993	Nureyev (USA) b. 1977	Northern Dancer	Nearctic
Dam Nikiya (USA) b. 1993	Nureyev (USA) b. 1977	Northern Dancer	Natalma
Dam Nikiya (USA) b. 1993	Nureyev (USA) b. 1977	Special	Forli
Dam Nikiya (USA) b. 1993	Nureyev (USA) b. 1977	Special	Tong
Dam Nikiya (USA) b. 1993	Reluctant Guest (USA) b. 1986	Hostage	Nijinsky
Dam Nikiya (USA) b. 1993	Reluctant Guest (USA) b. 1986	Hostage	Entente
Dam Nikiya (USA) b. 1993	Reluctant Guest (USA) b. 1986	Vaguely Royal	Vaguely Noble
Dam Nikiya (USA) b. 1993	Reluctant Guest (USA) b. 1986	Vaguely Royal	Shoshanna
