= Wilson Tesoro =

Japanese Thoroughbred racehorse (foaled 2019)

Wilson Tesoro ウィルソンテソーロ
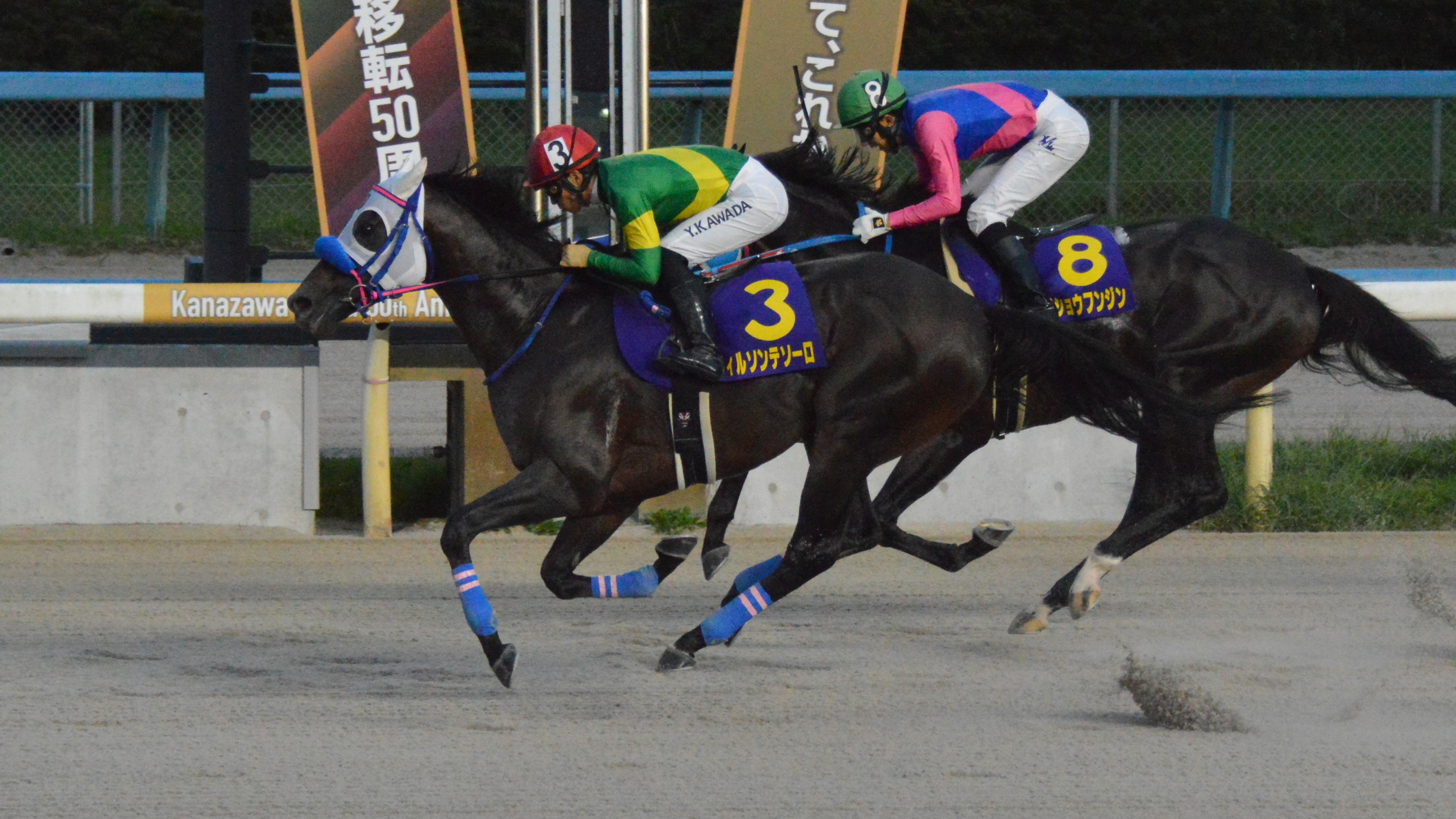
- Wilson Tesoro at the 2023 Hakusan Daishoten
- Breed: Thoroughbred
- Sire: Kitasan Black
- Grandsire: Black Tide
- Dam: Chest Keros
- Damsire: Uncle Mo
- Sex: Stallion
- Foaled: 25 February 2019
- Country: Japan
- Colour: Bay
- Breeder: Ryoken Farm
- Owner: Ryotokuji Kenji Holdings
- Racing colours
- Trainer: Noboru Takagi → Hiroyasu Tanaka → Hitoshi Kotegawa → Noboru Takagi
- Jockey: Yuga Kawada
- Record: 32: 10-9-1 (13 JRA: 4-3-0; 15 NAR: 6-5-1; 4 overseas: 0-1-0)
- Earnings: ¥1,151,601,400

Major wins
- Kakitsubata Kinen (2023); Mercury Cup (2023); Hakusan Daishoten (2023); Japan Breeding Farms' Cup Classic (2024); Mile Championship Nambu Hai (2025); Kashiwa Kinen (2026)

Wilson Tesoro (Japanese: ウィルソンテソーロ, Hepburn: Uiruson Tesōro; foaled 25 February 2019) is a Japanese Thoroughbred racehorse. He has competed since 2021, recording ten wins in thirty starts, including the Japan Breeding Farms' Cup Classic (JpnI) in 2024, the Mile Championship Nambu Hai (JpnI) in 2025, and the Kashiwa Kinen (JpnI) in 2026. He also finished second in the Champions Cup (GI) three consecutive years from 2023 to 2025, becoming only the fifth horse in JRA history to achieve this feat. His racing name combines "Wilson," a personal name, with "Tesoro," the Italian word for "treasure."

== Background ==
Wilson Tesoro is a bay stallion bred in Hidaka, Hokkaido, by Ryoken Farm. He was sired by Kitasan Black, a son of Black Tide, and his dam was Chest Keros, an American-bred mare by Uncle Mo. His dam died of laminitis shortly after giving birth to him, making Wilson Tesoro her only foal. He was owned by Ryotokuji Kenji Holdings and initially sent into training with Noboru Takagi at the JRA's Miho Training Center.

== Racing career ==
=== 2021–2022: early career ===
Wilson Tesoro debuted on August 28, 2021, in a maiden race on the turf at Niigata Racecourse, finishing sixth behind Equinox. He was subsequently diagnosed with a fracture in his left foreleg and was sidelined for an extended period. He returned in June 2022 but finished unplaced in two turf races before switching to dirt, where he won three consecutive races at Tokyo Racecourse.

=== 2023: four-year-old season ===
Wilson Tesoro won the Shofuku Stakes (Allowance) at Nakayama Racecourse in January, completing a four-race winning streak. He won the Kakitsubata Kinen (JpnIII) at Nagoya Racecourse in May in a race record time, the Mercury Cup (JpnIII) at Morioka Racecourse in July, and the Hakusan Daishoten (JpnIII) at Kanazawa Racecourse in September, achieving three consecutive graded stakes victories. He finished fifth in the Japan Breeding Farms' Cup Classic (JpnI) at Oi Racecourse in November. He finished second in the Champions Cup (GI) at Chukyo Racecourse in December at 92-to-1 odds, and second in the Tokyo Daishoten (GI) at Oi in December.

=== 2024: five-year-old season ===
Wilson Tesoro finished eighth in the February Stakes (GI) at Tokyo in February and fourth in the Dubai World Cup (G1) at Meydan Racecourse in March. He finished second in the Teio Sho (JpnI) at Oi in June and second in the Korea Cup (G3) at Seoul Racecourse in September. On November 4, he won the Japan Breeding Farms' Cup Classic (JpnI) at Saga Racecourse by four lengths, recording his first Grade 1-level victory and the first dirt Grade 1 victory for his sire Kitasan Black. He finished second in the Champions Cup (GI) at Chukyo in December and second in the Tokyo Daishoten (GI) at Oi in December.

=== 2025: six-year-old season ===
Wilson Tesoro finished fourth in the Saudi Cup (G1) at King Abdulaziz Racetrack in February and seventh in the Dubai World Cup (G1) at Meydan in April. He finished fifth in the Teio Sho (JpnI) at Oi in July. On October 13, he won the Mile Championship Nambu Hai (JpnI) at Morioka by four lengths, recording his second JpnI victory. He finished fifth in the JBC Classic (JpnI) at Funabashi Racecourse in November and second in the Champions Cup (GI) at Chukyo in December, becoming only the fifth horse in JRA history to finish second in the same GI race three consecutive years.

=== 2026: seven-year-old season ===
Wilson Tesoro finished second in the February Stakes (GI) at Tokyo in February. He was scheduled to contest the Dubai World Cup, but the plans were cancelled due to the 2026 Iran war occurring several weeks before the race. He instead ran in the Kashiwa Kinen (JpnI) on May 5 at Funabashi, where he won his third JpnI victory. He finished second in the Sakitama Hai (JpnI) at Urawa Racecourse in June. After a summer break, he resumed his season at the Mile Championship Nambu Hai (JpnI) to defend his title. Unfortunately, he got stuck in traffic at the final corner, and his final surge was not enough as he crossed the line third behind Meisho Hachiro and Strength. One month later, he raced in the JBC Sprint where he started from gate 10 on the day. When the race started, he ran at the back pack until the final corner, where he made a late charge on the inside rail and overtook every horse but one to finish in second place by one and a half lengths behind the winner, Meisho Hachiro once again. In the post-race, his trainer, Noboru Takagi, said the horse was only meant to be in preparation, but he was happy that Wilson Tesoro used his legs well throughout the race, as he declared that his next race, the Champions Cup, would be his retirement race.

== Statistics ==
The following table details all 32 starts of Wilson Tesoro's racing career based on official netkeiba, JBIS, and Racing Post records. Record current as of 3 November 2026.

Date	Distance (Condition)	Race	Class	Course	Odds (Favourite)	Field	Finish	Time	Jockey	Winning (Losing) Margin	Winner (2nd Place)	Ref
2021 – two-year-old season
Aug 28	Turf 1800 m (Firm)	2-Y-O Newcomer	Maiden	Niigata	27.0 (6th)	15	6th	1:49.3	Kosei Miura	1.9	Equinox	
2022 – three-year-old season
Jun 26	Turf 2400 m (Firm)	3-Y-O Maiden	Maiden	Tokyo	4.2 (3rd)	12	7th	2:27.9	Keita Tosaki	0.5	Oceans Yori	
Jul 17	Turf 1800 m (Firm)	3-Y-O Maiden	Maiden	Fukushima	4.5 (2nd)	15	13th	1:51.3	Keita Tosaki	1.4	Cosmo Express	
Aug 28	Dirt 1800 m (Good)	3-Y-O Maiden	Maiden	Niigata	5.3 (4th)	14	1st	1:51.8	Keita Tosaki	–1.8	(Satono Gibeon)	
Oct 15	Dirt 1600 m (Good)	3-Y-O 1-Win Class	Allowance	Tokyo	1.3 (1st)	12	1st	1:36.5	Keita Tosaki	–0.8	(Gruss Gott)	
Nov 12	Dirt 1600 m (Firm)	3-Y-O 2-Win Class	Allowance	Tokyo	1.4 (1st)	16	1st	1:36.6	Keita Tosaki	–0.2	(Daishin Pisces)	
2023 – four-year-old season
Jan 5	Dirt 1800 m (Firm)	Shofuku Stakes	Allowance	Nakayama	1.5 (1st)	12	1st	1:52.3	Keita Tosaki	–0.3	(Best Regard)	
Mar 19	Dirt 1800 m (Good)	Nagoyajo Stakes	Open	Chukyo	2.0 (1st)	16	5th	1:51.1	Katsuma Sameshima	0.9	Le Coeur Sale	
May 2	Dirt 1500 m (Firm)	Kakitsubata Kinen	JpnIII	Nagoya	3.0 (2nd)	12	1st	R1:31.1	Yuga Kawada	0.0	(Dry Stout)	
Jul 17	Dirt 2000 m (Heavy)	Mercury Cup	JpnIII	Morioka	2.2 (1st)	13	1st	R2:01.8	Yuga Kawada	–0.6	(Terios Bell)	
Sep 26	Dirt 2100 m (Firm)	Hakusan Daishoten	JpnIII	Kanazawa	1.2 (1st)	12	1st	2:11.0	Yuga Kawada	–0.1	(Meisho Funjin)	
Nov 3	Dirt 2000 m (Firm)	JBC Classic	JpnI	Oi	4.7 (3rd)	10	5th	2:06.9	Akira Sugawara	1.8	King's Sword	
Dec 3	Dirt 1800 m (Firm)	Champions Cup	GI	Chukyo	92.0 (12th)	15	2nd	1:50.8	Yusuke Hara	0.2	Lemon Pop	
Dec 29	Dirt 2000 m (Firm)	Tokyo Daishoten	GI	Oi	14.2 (6th)	9	2nd	2:07.4	Yusuke Hara	0.1	Ushba Tesoro	
2024 – five-year-old season
Feb 18	Dirt 1600 m (Firm)	February Stakes	GI	Tokyo	3.9 (2nd)	16	8th	1:36.6	Kohei Matsuyama	0.9	Peptide Nile	
Mar 30	Dirt 2000 m (Firm)	Dubai World Cup	G1	Meydan	–	12	4th	2:04.7	Yusuke Hara	2.4	Laurel River	
Jun 26	Dirt 2000 m (Good)	Teio Sho	JpnI	Oi	3.2 (1st)	13	2nd	2:07.2	Yuga Kawada	0.3	King's Sword	
Sep 8	Dirt 1800 m (Good)	Korea Cup	G3	Seoul	1.5 (1st)	11	2nd	1:52.7	Yuga Kawada	0.9	Crown Pride	
Nov 4	Dirt 2000 m (Firm)	JBC Classic	JpnI	Saga	2.1 (1st)	11	1st	2:08.0	Yuga Kawada	–0.8	(Meisho Hario)	
Dec 1	Dirt 1800 m (Firm)	Champions Cup	GI	Chukyo	5.5 (2nd)	16	2nd	1:50.1	Yuga Kawada	0.0	Lemon Pop	
Dec 29	Dirt 2000 m (Firm)	Tokyo Daishoten	GI	Oi	5.0 (2nd)	10	2nd	2:05.3	Yuga Kawada	0.3	Forever Young	
2025 – six-year-old season
Feb 22	Dirt 1800 m (Fast)	Saudi Cup	G1	KAA	16.0 (5th)	14	4th	1:51.54	Yuga Kawada	2.45	Forever Young	
Apr 5	Dirt 2000 m (Fast)	Dubai World Cup	G1	Meydan	33.0 (7th)	11	7th	2:04.83	Yuga Kawada	1.33	Hit Show	
Jul 2	Dirt 2000 m (Firm)	Teio Sho	JpnI	Oi	4.4 (2nd)	13	5th	2:04.1	Yuga Kawada	1.0	Mikki Fight	
Oct 13	Dirt 1600 m (Firm)	Mile Championship Nambu Hai	JpnI	Morioka	5.1 (4th)	16	1st	1:34.3	Yuga Kawada	–0.6	(Sixpence)	
Nov 3	Dirt 1800 m (Good)	JBC Classic	JpnI	Funabashi	3.9 (2nd)	14	5th	1:54.2	Yuga Kawada	2.2	Mikki Fight	
Dec 7	Dirt 1800 m (Firm)	Champions Cup	GI	Chukyo	7.3 (2nd)	16	2nd	1:50.2	Yuga Kawada	0.0	W Heart Bond	
2026 – seven-year-old season
Feb 22	Dirt 1600 m (Firm)	February Stakes	GI	Tokyo	5.4 (3rd)	16	2nd	1:35.5	Yuga Kawada	0.1	Costa Nova	
May 5	Dirt 1600 m (Firm)	Kashiwa Kinen	JpnI	Funabashi	5.0 (3rd)	13	1st	1:38.6	Yuga Kawada	–0.1	(Mikki Fight)	
Jun 24	Dirt 1400 m (Good)	Sakitama Hai	JpnI	Urawa	1.8 (1st)	11	2nd	1:25.6	Yuga Kawada	0.3	Lord Fons	
Oct 12	Dirt 1600 m (Firm)	Mile Championship Nambu Hai	JpnI	Morioka	1.7 (1st)	11	3rd	1:35.4	Yuga Kawada	0.7	Meisho Hachiro	
Nov 3	Dirt 1400 m (Firm)	JBC Sprint	JpnI	Kanazawa	4.5 (3rd)	12	2nd	1:25.8	Yuga Kawada	0.3	Meisho Hachiro	

== Pedigree ==
Pedigree of Wilson Tesoro (JPN), bay stallion, 2019
Sire Kitasan Black (JPN) 2012	Black Tide (JPN); 2001	Sunday Silence	Halo
Sire Kitasan Black (JPN) 2012	Black Tide (JPN); 2001	Sunday Silence	Wishing Well
Sire Kitasan Black (JPN) 2012	Black Tide (JPN); 2001	Wind in Her Hair	Alzao
Sire Kitasan Black (JPN) 2012	Black Tide (JPN); 2001	Wind in Her Hair	Burghclere
Sire Kitasan Black (JPN) 2012	Sugar Heart (JPN); 2005	Sakura Bakushin O	Sakura Yutaka O
Sire Kitasan Black (JPN) 2012	Sugar Heart (JPN); 2005	Sakura Bakushin O	Sakura Hagoromo
Sire Kitasan Black (JPN) 2012	Sugar Heart (JPN); 2005	Otomegokoro	Judge Angelucci
Sire Kitasan Black (JPN) 2012	Sugar Heart (JPN); 2005	Otomegokoro	Tizly
Dam Chest Keros (USA) 2013	Uncle Mo (USA); 2008	Indian Charlie	In Excess
Dam Chest Keros (USA) 2013	Uncle Mo (USA); 2008	Indian Charlie	Soviet Sojourn
Dam Chest Keros (USA) 2013	Uncle Mo (USA); 2008	Playa Maya	Arch
Dam Chest Keros (USA) 2013	Uncle Mo (USA); 2008	Playa Maya	Dixie Slippers
Dam Chest Keros (USA) 2013	Deputy's Delight (USA); 1997	French Deputy	Deputy Minister
Dam Chest Keros (USA) 2013	Deputy's Delight (USA); 1997	French Deputy	Mitterand
Dam Chest Keros (USA) 2013	Deputy's Delight (USA); 1997	Bishop's Delight	Sawbones
Dam Chest Keros (USA) 2013	Deputy's Delight (USA); 1997	Bishop's Delight	Med Coed

- Wilson Tesoro is inbred 5 × 5 to Lyphard (sire side).
- His sire Kitasan Black won the 2016 Kikuka Shō (GI) and 2017 Tennō Shō (Spring, GI).
- His dam, Chest Keros, died of laminitis shortly after giving birth to him, making Wilson Tesoro her only foal.

== See also ==
- Thoroughbred racing in Japan
- Japan Breeding Farms' Cup Classic
- Kitasan Black
