= Copano Rickey =

Japanese-bred thoroughbred racehorse

Copano Rickey コパノリッキー
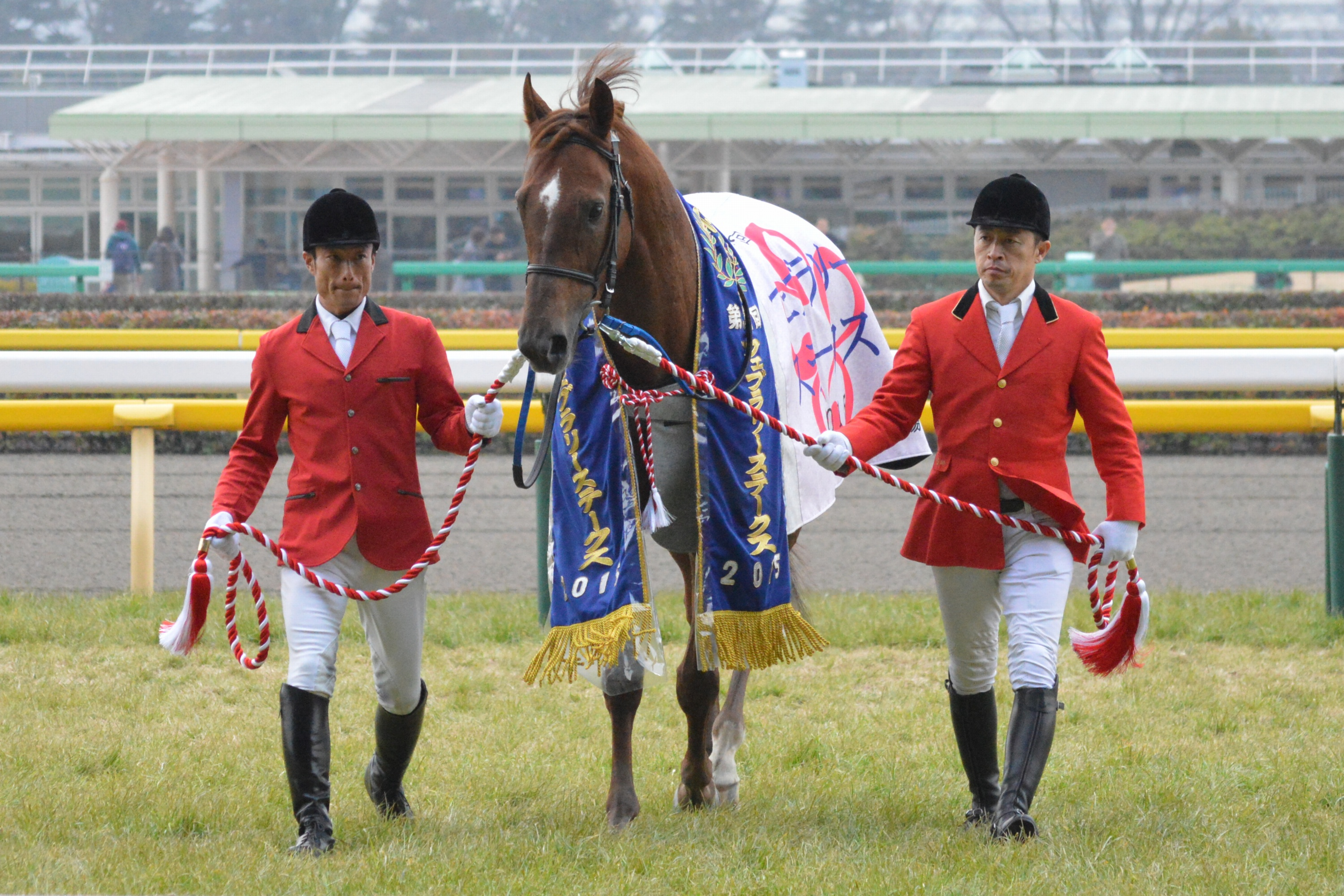
- Copano Rickey after winning the 2015 February Stakes.
- Breed: Thoroughbred
- Sire: Gold Allure (JPN)
- Grandsire: Sunday Silence (USA)
- Dam: Copano Nikita (JPN)
- Damsire: Timber Country (USA)
- Sex: Stallion
- Foaled: March 24, 2010 (age 16)
- Country: Japan
- Color: Chestnut
- Breeder: Yanagawa Bokujo
- Owner: Sachiaki Kobayashi
- Racing colours
- Trainer: Akira Murayama
- Jockey: Hironobu Tanabe; Yutaka Take
- Record: 33: 16-3-3; JRA: 16: 6-0-2; NAR: 17: 10-3-1
- Earnings: ¥995,144,000; JRA: ¥308,244,000; NAR: ¥686,900,000

Major wins
- February Stakes (2014, 2015); Tokyo Daishoten (2017); Tokai Stakes (2015); Kashiwa Kinen (2014, 2016, 2017); JBC Classic (2014, 2015); Teio Sho (2016); Mile Championship Nambu Hai (2016, 2017); Hyogo Championship (2013)

Awards
- JRA Award for Best Dirt Horse (2015); NAR Grand Prix Dirt Grade Race Special Award (2016, 2017)

Copano Rickey (Japanese: コパノリッキー, Hepburn: Kopano Rikkii; foaled March 24, 2010) is a retired champion Japanese Thoroughbred racehorse and active breeding stallion. His major wins include the February Stakes (2014, 2015), the JBC Classic (2014, 2015), the Kashiwa Kinen (2014, 2016, 2017), the 2016 Teio Sho, the Mile Championship Nambu Hai (2016, 2017), and the 2017 Tokyo Daishoten. With 11 GI/JpnI wins, this makes Copano Rickey the Japanese-trained horse with the most wins. He was nicknamed the "great actor of the dirt (砂上の千両役者).

== Racing career ==
=== 2012-13: two-and-three year old seasons ===
Copano Rickey made his debut in December 2012 at a debut race for two-year-olds but finished in 8th place. After winning a maiden race in January 2013, he won his second race in a row, which was an allowance race. Following a 3rd-place finish at the Hyacinth Stakes and a victory at the Fukuryu Stakes, Copano Rickey won his first graded race by winning the Hyogo Championship. After this win, he was planned to be entered in to the Tōkyō Yūshun, but was forced out of the races after a fracture was discovered in the radius of the right forearm.

=== 2014: four-year-old season ===
Copano Rickey started the season with his first Grade I race, the February Stakes. As the horse was selected for the final open slot of the gate in a 50/50 draw against Keiai Leone, the horse was the least favored to win in a field of 16 horses. During the race, the horse was placed in second of the pack, and after taking the lead in the final stretch managed to stave off Hokko Tarumae, who was making a push to take the lead. This was the first Grade I victory for both the horse, and jockey Hironobu Tanabe. The win payout for that race, 27,210 yen, was the second highest return in JRA GI history since Sand Peeress won the 1989 Queen Elizabeth II Cup.

Later, the horse was entered in to the Kashiwa Kinen held on May 5, and won. In that race, Copano Rickey did not start well, but moved in to the outside of the pack and started to push up at around the 3rd corner and caught up to the front of the pack by the 4th corner, surpassing the pack on the final stretch and winning the race. The crop was only used twice. The race had coincided with the birthday of the owner, Sachiaki Kobayashi, and Tanabe commented that he was relieved that, despite the pressure from that fact, he was able to win the race. Osamu Saito, who wrote an article about the race on web Furlong 2014, noted that those who saw the victory at the February Stakes as a mere fluke would have had to change their minds. Saito also wrote that he believed that the horse would be a central figure of the Dirt GI/JpnI races in the coming years.

On November 3, Copano Rickey entered the Japan Breeding Farms' Cup Classic and won. After the race, Tanabe commented "I always thought the horse was strong, so whenever I'm told 'your horse is strong', I can only agree to that", showing trust towards the horse. The horse's trainer, Murayama, also expressed hope in the horse becoming stronger, stating that "his potential is high, and I believe we can go to a level further."

=== 2015: five-year-old season ===
Copano Rickey started the year off with the Tokai Stakes, with Yutaka Take as his jockey. After taking the lead at the 4th corner, he finished the race with a 4-length lead. After this race, Copano Rickey was entered in to the February Stakes once again, where the horse once again ran in second, trailing front-runner Admire Royal for most of the race before taking the lead and keeping the lead even as Incantation closed in, winning the race by a half-length lead. A few days later, it was announced that the horse had suffered a left distal radius fracture and reported that it would take six months to recover.

His recovery was progressing well throughout the summer, and he made his return on the Nippon TV Hai in October, as he was sticking with Take again as his jockey. In the race, Copano Rickey led for the majority of the race until he faded out on the final straight and finished third on the day, behind Sound True and Chrysolite. His next race was the JBC Classic. Take similarly rode him as the previous going and for this time around, he managed to held on to win by two-and-a-half lengths over Chrysolite whilst Hokko Tarumae placed third. He also became the fifth horse in history to win this race in back-to-back years. Despite having a good year so far, he closed the season on bad note in December as he only managed to finish in seventh place at the Champions Cup and fourth place at the Tokyo Daishōten. Post race, Take admitted that Copano Rickey was marked so well by other horses that made him hard to get to the right position at the corners. For his excellent performance for the year with three graded stakes win in six starts, he was awarded as the best dirt horse of the year by the JRA.

=== 2016: six-year-old season ===
For this season, he began his season with the February Stakes as a defending champion for two years running and aimed for the historic third win in a row. As the race started, he settled on the rail side during the early to mid-race. Running into the final straight, Copano Rickey held on in the front group but gradually lost pace near the end, finishing in seventh place for the day. Since this time around he was voted to start at the inside gate, Take decided to switch his usual front-running approach to pace-chasing but as it showed, the horse did not have the pace for the day to seal the deal. Murayama commented that he determined that the horse would get his revenge in the future Kashiwa Kinen on May. Early on at the gate voting, it was looking bleak as he was selected to start from the innermost gate 1 for this race. Turned out this was a blessing as he nailed a good start, maintained his position on second in the front group behind Sorte, drew alongside him at the final bend, overtook him into the final straight and turned on the jets to get his first win of the season. Maruyama noted that he concerned that the horse might get boxed in due to inside gate start but relieved that he came through and positioned himself at the right place the whole race. One month later, Copano Rickey would participate in the Teio Sho for the second time after losing to Wonder Acute two years prior. When the gates opened, the horse was calmed down and maintained by Take in the third position. After the third corner, Take triggered the horse to move forward, surpassed two horses in front of him, and pulled away for the rest of the time. He won convincingly by three-and-a-half lengths over the second place, Nonkonoyume.

For the second half of the season, he resumed his feat at the Mile Championship Nambu Hai. Maruyama has an early initiative to send him abroad but changed his decision and focused on the horse's domestic campaign instead. On this occasion, Tanabe would be back as his jockey due to Take being assigned to Kyoto on the same day. Despite the jockey change, Copano Rickey did not have any problems in the race as he pulled away from third position to the lead at the final straight to win in a record time over Best Warrior in second and Hokko Tarumae in third. This would be his eighth GI/JpnI title, and Maruyama boldly declared that he wanted the horse to win the Champions Cup and Tokyo Daishoten in the pursuit of a record-breaking 11th title. This claim was fully tested as once again Copano Rickey failed to place well in his final three races of the season where he failed to defend his JBC Classic title and only finished in fifth place, failed to match the race pace and fell back to 13th place at the Champions Cup, and lost the final drag race to the line and finished in fifth. His three JpnI titles in the season were worthy of being given the special award from NAR for the year.

=== 2017: seven-year-old season ===
Take was back in his saddle for the February Stakes, which he would start from gate 4, which was the gate he got back when he won the race two years ago. Maruyama said it was a good omen this time for the horse, which turned out to be the opposite on the day as he backed off the order from briefly leading it at the final stretch 300 metres from the line, which saw him finish in 14th place. His next scheduled race would be the Kashiwa Kinen, in which there were concerns about his recent form despite his being the two-time winner of said race. The concern was dismissed after Take rode him in sixth position before sprinting away at the final straight to take the win by two lengths over Incantation for his ninth GI/JpnI. He was supposed to end his spring campaign with another run at the Teio Sho but he was diagnosed with arthritis in his right knee which effectively removed him from the contention with no clear return date.

He eventually returned in October at the Mile Championship Nambu Hai, back with Hironobu Tanabe as his jockey. He started the race nicely and positioned himself in third position in the pack. At the fourth corner, he showed excellent momentum and tried to catch the leaders, and then pulled away from the rest of the field in the straight to win the race by four lengths. This was his career's tenth GI/JpnI title. One month later, he joined the JBC Sprint and would be ridden by a local jockey, Taito Mori. Mori did well in his first ride of the horse as he rode him from the back and moved to the lead in the final phase to finish in second place just a head behind the winner, Nishiken Momonofu. After this race, it was decided that Copano Rickey would retire from racing after the final two race of the season, the Champions Cup and the Tokyo Daishōten, in which Tanabe was picked as his final jockey. In the Champions Cup, the horse had a duel with T M Jinsoku in the final straight before both of them were overtaken by the eventual winner, Gold Dream which was jockeyed by Ryan Moore in the final 50 metres. Copano Rickey finished third for the day behind both Gold Dream and T M Jinsoku. Despite not winning the race in his final attempt, Tanabe expected this race would went to the line with T M Jinsoku and said the horse had run an ideal race just now.

On December 25, he had a final workout session for the Tokyo Daishoten under Murayama. Four days later on December 29, Copano Rickey ran his final race, the Tokyo Daishōten. There, the horse took the lead early on and became the front-runner and ran the race at his own pace, before lengthening his lead in the final stretch and not letting Sound True take over the lead; winning the race and achieving his 11th GI/JpnI race, the most wins for any Japanese horse at the time. A retirement ceremony was held at Kyoto Racecourse on January 6, 2018, and his racehorse registration was withdrawn on January 10. Copano Rickey ended his racing career on a high note after he won the special award from NAR for the second year in a row. Following his retirement, the horse was sent to the Breeders Stallion Station to stand stud there.

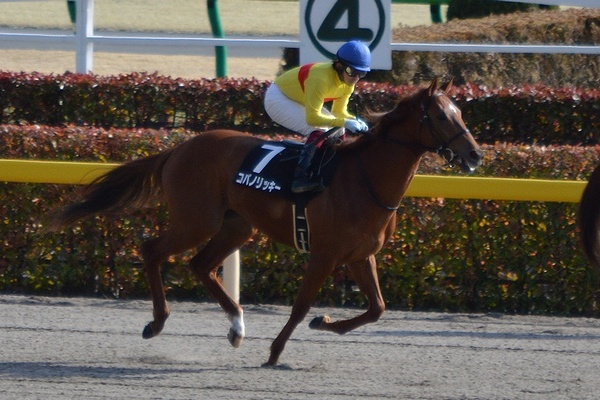
2014 Hyacinth Stakes

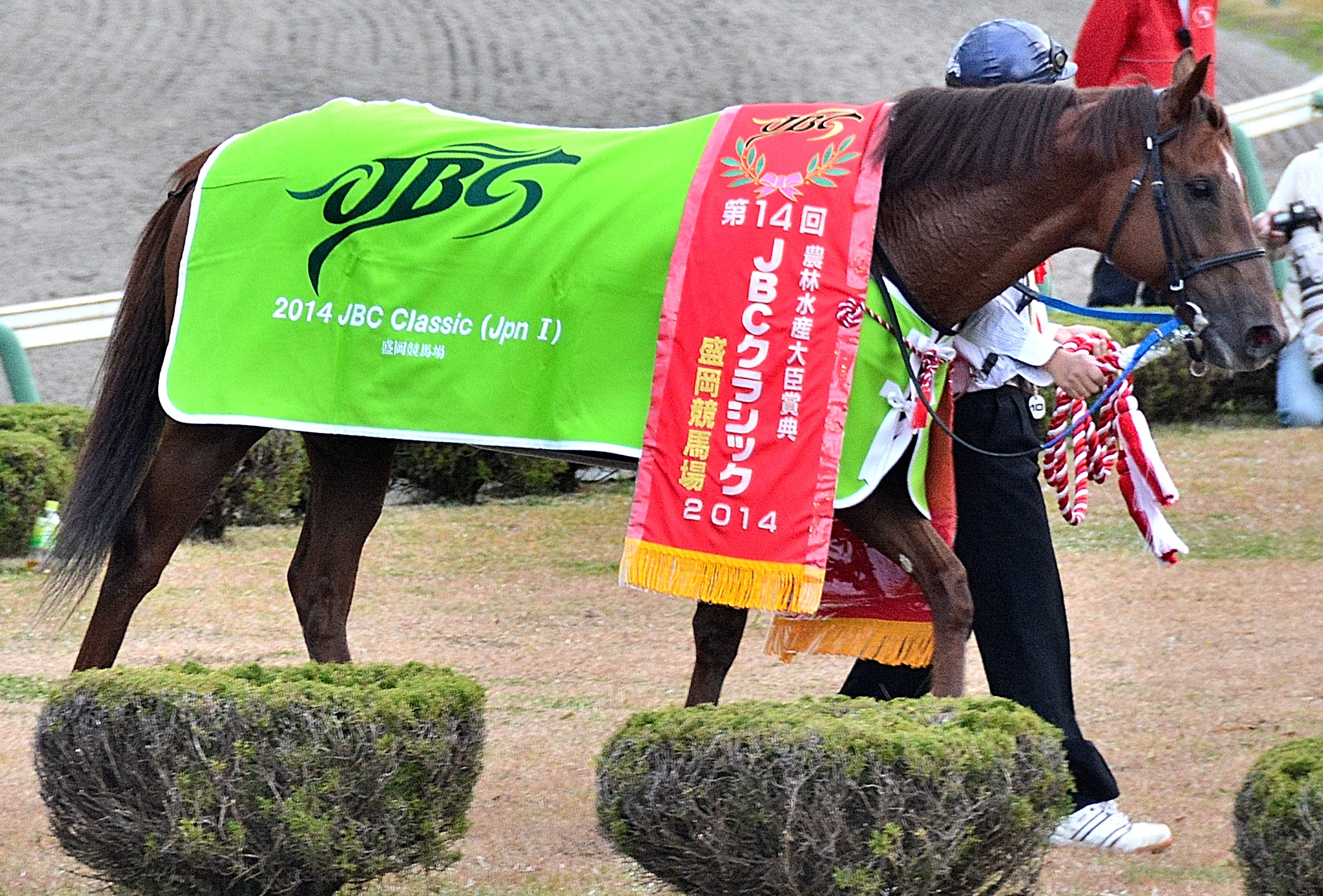
2014 JBC Classic

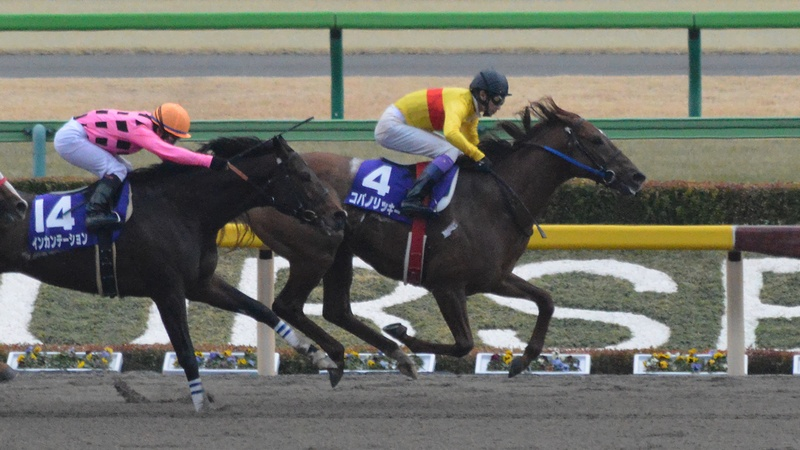
2015 February Stakes

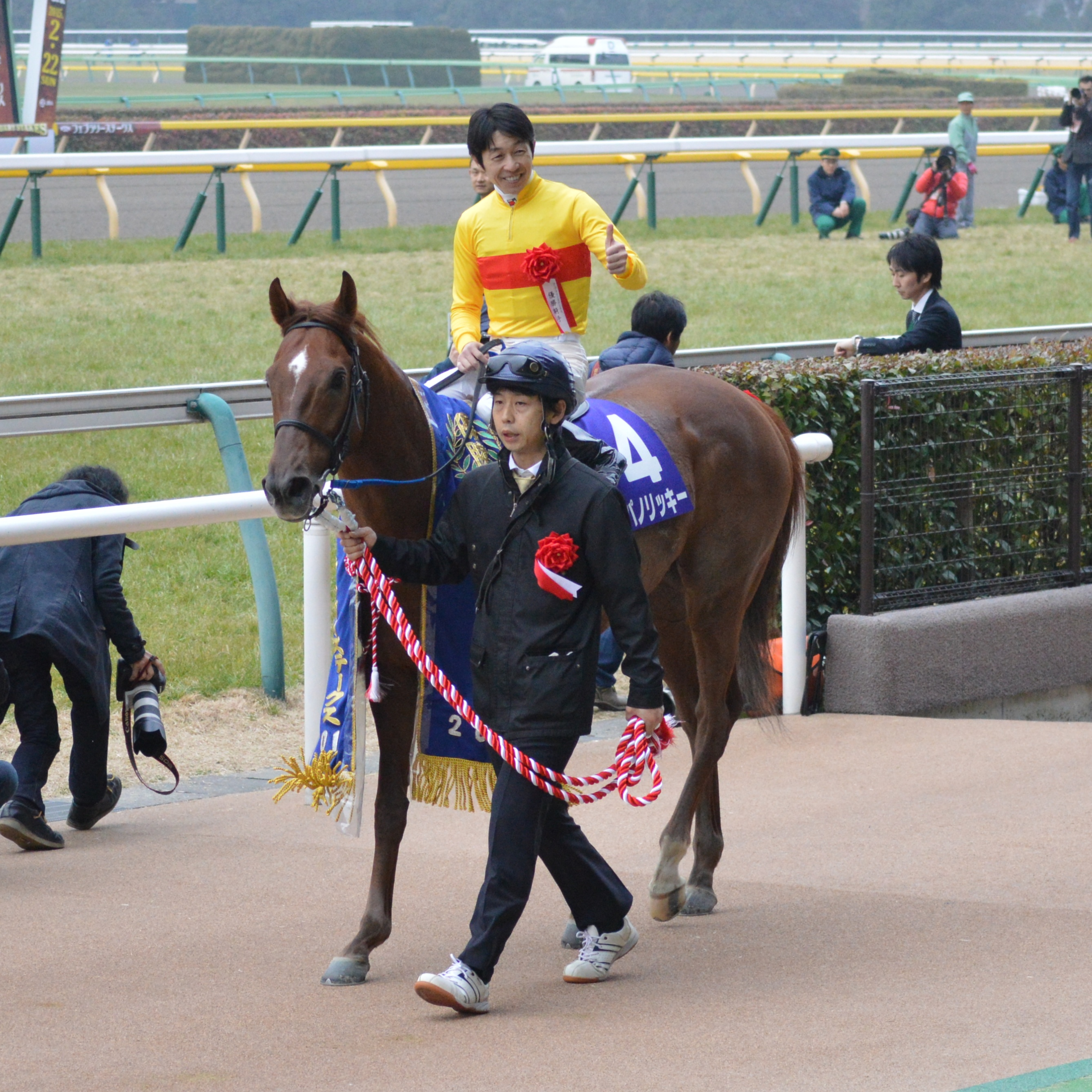
Copano Rickey with his jockey, Yutaka Take after winning the 2015 February Stakes

== Stud career ==
Copano Rickey became a breeding stallion at the Breeders Stallion Station in 2018, with a service fee of 800,000JPY (on the condition of conception) or 1,200,000JPY (on the condition of birth), and covered 194 mares that season.

His first crops debuted in 2021, with 138 horses being registered in the studbook, which was the most for any new stallions that year. Love Me Doll became the first winner for that season's race for two-year old, which was the JRA Fresh Challenge held at Monbetsu Racecourse on April 14, which also marked the first victory of the stallion's progeny. Copano Nicholson became the first progeny to win a JRA race when the horse won a maiden race at Chukyo Racecourse on September 26 that same year.

== In popular culture ==
An anthropomorphized version of Copano Rickey appears as a character in the Japanese multimedia franchise Umamusume: Pretty Derby, voiced by Konomi Inagaki. She is a depicted as an upbeat girl and avid feng shui practictioner, reflecting her real-world counterpart's owner Sachiaki Kobayashi's occupation as an architect and his own belief in feng shui. As part of her belief in the practice, she loves cleaning and hates dirtiness to the point where she keeps her own cleaning tools free from dirt or dust. While close friends with Hokko Tarumae, her adherence to feng shui and other superstitions sometimes puts her at odds with her more logical-minded friend.

== Racing statistics ==
The following form is based on information available at netkeiba.com.

Date	Racecourse	Race	Grade	Distance (condition)	Runner	BK	Draw	Odds (favored)	Finished	Time	Difference	Jockey	1st place（2nd place）
2012.12.22	Hanshin	2YO Debut Race		Dirt 1800m (Heavy)	11	6	7	42.8 (8)	8th	1:55.2	1.3	Ryota Sameshima	Hirono Emperor
2013. 1.12	Kyoto	3YO Maiden Race		Dirt 1800m (Good)	16	7	14	35.9 (8)	1st	1:52.4	-0.8	Haruhiko Kawasu	(Dynamic War)
1.27	Tokyo	3YO Allowance (1 Win)		Dirt 1400m (Good)	14	7	12	1.9 (1)	1st	1:25.5	-0.9	Christophe Lemaire	(Sound True)
2.17	Tokyo	Hyacinth Stakes	OP	Dirt 1600m (Good)	16	4	7	2.2 (1)	3rd	1:36.8	0.2	Yuichi Fukunaga	Charlie Brave
3.31	Nakayama	Fukuryu Stakes	OP	Dirt 1800m (Good)	15	8	14	2.8 (1)	1st	1:53.6	0.0	Yuichi Fukunaga	(Lord Crusader)
5. 2	Sonoda	Hyogo Championship	JpnII	Dirt 1870m (Good)	11	7	9	1.5 (1)	1st	1:58.4	-1.0	Yuichi Fukunaga	(Best Warrior)
11.17	Tokyo	Shimotsuki Stakes	OP	Dirt 1400m (Good)	16	2	3	4.0 (1)	10th	1:24.8	1.1	Hiroyuki Uchida	A Shin Top
12.23	Nakayama	2013 Farewell Stakes	OP	Dirt 1800m (Good Soft)	16	3	6	6.6 (3)	9th	1:52.3	1.4	Keita Tosaki	Jebel Musa
2014. 2.23	Tokyo	February Stakes	GI	Dirt 1600m (Good)	16	7	13	272.1 (16)	1st	1:36.0	-0.1	Hironobu Tanabe	(Hokko Tarumae)
5. 5	Funabashi	Kashiwa Kinen	JpnI	Dirt 1600m (Good)	8	5	5	2.4 (2)	1st	1:39.2	-0.4	Hironobu Tanabe	(Sei Crimson)
6.25	Ohi	Teio Sho	JpnI	Dirt 2000m (Heavy)	16	8	15	1.6 (2)	2nd	2:03.9	0.4	Hironobu Tanabe	Wonder Acute
11. 3	Morioka	JBC Classic	JpnI	Dirt 2000m (Soft)	16	8	15	4.8 (3)	1st	2:00.8	-0.5	Hironobu Tanabe	(Chrysolite)
12. 7	Chukyo	Champions Cup	GI	Dirt 1800m (Good)	16	7	14	3.0 (1)	12th	1:52.2	1.2	Hironobu Tanabe	Hokko Tarumae
12.29	Ohi	Tokyo Daishōten	GI	Dirt 2000m (Soft)	16	4	7	4.1 (2)	2nd	2:03.8	0.8	Hironobu Tanabe	Hokko Tarumae
2015. 1.25	Chukyo	Tokai Stakes	GII	Dirt 1800m (Good)	14	4	6	2.5 (1)	1st	1:50.9	-0.7	Yutaka Take	(Grand City)
2.22	Tokyo	February Stakes	GI	Dirt 1600m (Good)	16	2	4	2.1 (1)	1st	1:36.3	-0.1	Yutaka Take	(Incantation)
10. 7	Funabashi	Nippon TV Hai	JpnII	Dirt 1800m (Good)	12	3	3	1.6 (1)	3rd	1:52.2	2.0	Yutaka Take	Sound True
11. 3	Ohi	JBC Classic	JpnI	Dirt 2000m (Heavy)	16	8	15	6.2 (3)	1st	2:04.4	-0.5	Yutaka Take	(Sound True)
12. 6	Chukyo	Champions Cup	GI	Dirt 1800m (Good)	16	4	7	3.3 (1)	7th	1:51.2	0.8	Yutaka Take	Sambista
12.29	Ohi	Tokyo Daishōten	GI	Dirt 2000m (Good)	14	7	11	2.7 (2)	4th	2:04.5	1.5	Yutaka Take	Sound True
2016. 2.21	Tokyo	February Stakes	GI	Dirt 1600m (Soft)	16	2	3	7.9 (4)	7th	1:34.6	0.6	Yutaka Take	Moanin
5.5	Funabashi	Kashiwa Kinen	JpnI	Dirt 1600m (Good Soft)	12	1	1	6.3 (3)	1st	1:39.2	-0.7	Yutaka Take	(Sorte)
6.29	Ohi	Teio Sho	JpnI	Dirt 2000m (Heavy)	12	3	3	6.6 (1)	1st	2:03.5	-0.7	Yutaka Take	(Nonkono Yume)
10.10	Morioka	Mile Championship Nambu Hai	JpnI	Dirt 1600m (Good Soft)	13	7	12	1.8 (1)	1st	1:33.5	-0.3	Hironobu Tanabe	(Best Warrior)
11. 3	Kawasaki	JBC Classic	JpnI	Dirt 2100m (Soft)	14	5	7	2.1 (1)	5th	2:16.0	0.7	Hironobu Tanabe	Awardee
12. 4	Chukyo	Champions Cup	GI	Dirt 1800m (Good)	15	6	11	6.3 (3)	13th	1:51.6	1.5	Christophe Lemaire	Sound True
12.29	Ohi	Tokyo Daishōten	GI	Dirt 2000m (Soft)	14	2	2	5.4 (3)	5th	2:07.5	1.7	Keita Tosaki	Apollo Kentucky
2017. 2.21	Tokyo	February Stakes	GI	Dirt 1600m (Good)	16	2	4	9.0 (6)	14th	1:36.5	1.4	Yutaka Take	Gold Dream
5.5	Funabashi	Kashiwa Kinen	JpnI	Dirt 1600m (Good)	10	1	1	3.2 (2)	1st	1:39.9	-0.4	Yutaka Take	(Incantation)
10. 9	Morioka	Mile Championship Nambu Hai	JpnI	Dirt 1600m (Good Soft)	16	6	11	3.1 (1)	1st	1:34.9	-0.6	Hironobu Tanabe	(Nobo Baccara)
11. 3	Ohi	JBC Sprint	JpnI	Dirt 1200m (Soft)	16	5	10	3.0 (1)	2nd	1:11.4	0.0	Taito Mori	Nishiken Mononofu
12. 3	Chukyo	Champions Cup	GI	Dirt 1800m (Good)	15	1	1	13.2 (9)	3rd	1:50.2	0.1	Hironobu Tanabe	Gold Dream
12.29	Ohi	Tokyo Daishōten	GI	Dirt 2000m (Good)	16	7	13	4.7 (3)	1st	2:04.2	-0.6	Hironobu Tanabe	(Sound True)

== Pedigree ==
Pedigree of Copano Rickey
Sire Gold Allure 1999 ch.	Sunday Silence; 1986 br.	Halo	Hail to Reason
Sire Gold Allure 1999 ch.	Sunday Silence; 1986 br.	Halo	Cosmah
Sire Gold Allure 1999 ch.	Sunday Silence; 1986 br.	Wishing Well	Understanding
Sire Gold Allure 1999 ch.	Sunday Silence; 1986 br.	Wishing Well	Mountain Flower
Sire Gold Allure 1999 ch.	Nikiya; 1993 b.	Nureyev	Northern Dancer
Sire Gold Allure 1999 ch.	Nikiya; 1993 b.	Nureyev	Special
Sire Gold Allure 1999 ch.	Nikiya; 1993 b.	Reluctant Guest	Hostage
Sire Gold Allure 1999 ch.	Nikiya; 1993 b.	Reluctant Guest	Vaguely Royal
Dam Copano Nikita 2001 ch.	Timber Country; 1992 ch.	Woodman	Mr. Prospector
Dam Copano Nikita 2001 ch.	Timber Country; 1992 ch.	Woodman	Playmate
Dam Copano Nikita 2001 ch.	Timber Country; 1992 ch.	Fall Aspen	Pretense
Dam Copano Nikita 2001 ch.	Timber Country; 1992 ch.	Fall Aspen	Change Water
Dam Copano Nikita 2001 ch.	Nihon Pillow Rose; 1996 ch	Tony Bin	Kampala
Dam Copano Nikita 2001 ch.	Nihon Pillow Rose; 1996 ch	Tony Bin	Severn Bridge
Dam Copano Nikita 2001 ch.	Nihon Pillow Rose; 1996 ch	Wedding Bouquet	Real Shadai
Dam Copano Nikita 2001 ch.	Nihon Pillow Rose; 1996 ch	Wedding Bouquet	Alywin
