= Espoir City =

Japanese thoroughbred racehorse

Espoir City エスポワールシチー
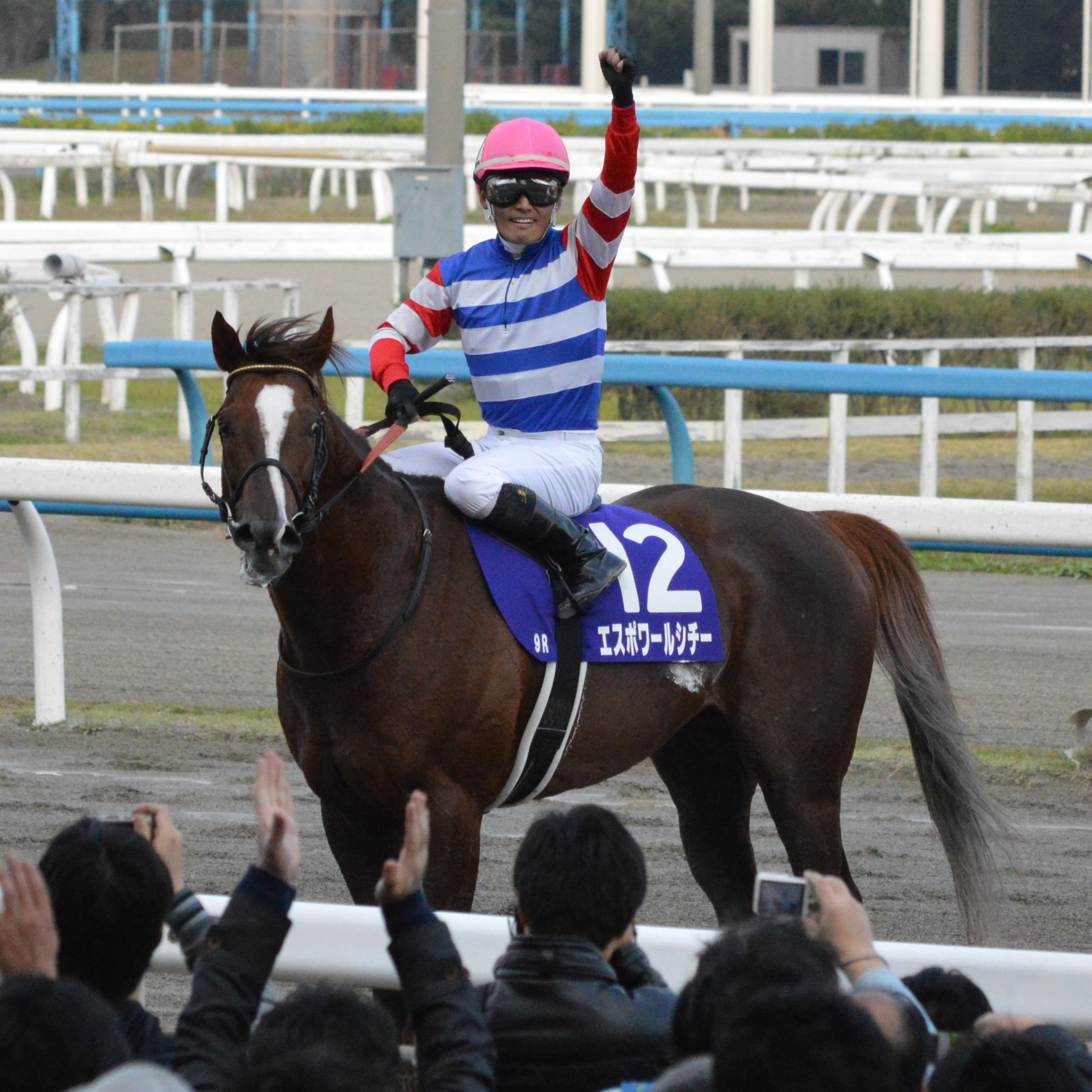
- Espoir City right after winning the JBC Sprint in 2013
- Breed: Thoroughbred
- Sire: Gold Allure
- Grandsire: Sunday Silence
- Dam: Eminent City
- Damsire: Brian's Time
- Sex: Stallion
- Foaled: April 22, 2005 (age 21)
- Country: Japan
- Color: Chestnut
- Breeder: Ikuchise Bokujo
- Owner: Yushun Horse
- Racing colors
- Trainer: Akio Adachi
- Jockey: Tetsuzō Satō; Hiroki Goto
- Record: 40: 17-10-3
- Earnings: ¥1,023,197,000

Major wins
- March Stakes (2009); Champions Cup (2009); February Stakes (2010); Kashiwa Kinen (2009, 2010, 2012); Mile Championship Nambu Hai (2009, 2012, 2013); Nagoya Daishoten (2011); Miyako Stakes (2011); JBC Sprint (2013)

Awards
- JRA Award for Best Dirt Horse (2009 & 2010)

Espoir City (Japanese: エスポワールシチー, Hepburn: Espowaaru Shichii; foaled April 22, 2005) is a Japanese Thoroughbred racehorse and the winner of the 2010 February Stakes.

== Background ==
Espoir City was foaled out of Eminent City who won three out of 23 races. He was sired by Gold Allure who won the 2002 Japan Dirt Derby, 2002 Tokyo Daishoten and 2003 February Stakes.

In the beginning, his dam had some complications when giving birth to her first foal, causing her womb to get damaged. She got permission later from the veterinarian to continue her duties as a broodmare. At the order of Yushun Horse, Eminent City was scheduled to be slaughtered, but the breeder, Ikuchise kept her in secret as a riding horse for Scarlet Riding Club for several years. It wasn't until Espoir City's gradual success on the dirt when the details had been fully revealed to the public.

His name came from the French word for hope, Espoir and the Yushun Horse crown's name, City.

== Racing career ==
Espoir City debuted on March 9, 2008, at Hanshin, where he came in 3rd. He got his first win after six races on July 29, 2008, when he won at Kokura. He then picked up another win at Kokura on August 10, 2008. This sparked a 4 race winstreak.

2009 was a very successful year for Espoir City. He went on a 6 race winstreak. He picked up his first graded win on March 29, 2009, when he won the March Stakes. He then won his first Grade 1 race by winning the May 5th, 2009 Kashiwa Kinen. He also won both the JpnI Mile Championship Nambu Hai on October 12, 2009, and the G1 2009 Champions Cup in December.

He started off 2010 with another Grade 1 win, this time at the February 21st, 2010 February Stakes. He then successfully defended his Kashiwa Kinen title on May 5, 2010, to cap off his win streak.

His next win came on March 21, 2011, when he won the Nagoya Taishoten. He tried to defend his Kashiwa Kinen title for a 2nd time in May, but came in 3rd place. He was only able to win one more race in 2011, when he captured the November 2011 Miyako Stakes.

He returned to the Kashiwa Kinen on May 2, 2012, and won the race for the 3rd and final time. Later in October, he also re-captured the Mile Championship Nambu Hai.

2013 was Espoir City's final year in racing. He came in 2nd at the 2013 February Stakes and at the 2013 Kashiwa Kinen. He then won the Mile Championship Nambu Hai for the 3rd and final time in October. His last win was the November 4th, 2013 Japan Breeding farms' Cup Sprint. He finished his career with a 7th-place finish at the Champions Cup on December 1, 2013. After retirement, he became a breeding stallion at Yushun Stallion Station.

== Stud career ==
Espoir City's descendants include:

c = colt, f = filly

| Foaled | Name | Sex | Major Wins |
| 2015 | Yamano Fight | c | Haneda Hai |
| 2015 | Eternal Mall | f | Jungfrau Sho |
| 2015 | Cornus Florida | c | Hyogo Derby, Sonoda Junior Cup |
| 2017 | Keiai Dorie | c | Hokkaido Sprint Cup |
| 2017 | Smile We | c | Teletama Hai Oval Sprint |
| 2017 | Vacation | c | Zen-Nippon Nisai Yushun |
| 2018 | Igniter | c | Japan Breeding farms' Cup Sprint, Sakitama Hai |
| 2019 | Peisha Es | c | Nagoya Grand Prix, Elm Stakes |

== In popular culture ==
An anthropomorphized version of the horse appears as a character in Umamusume: Pretty Derby, voiced by Asaka.

== Racing form ==
Espoir City won 17 and placed 13 races in 40 starts. The data available is based on JBIS and netkeiba.

| Date | Race | Grade | Distance | Surface | Condition | Track | Entry | Finish | Time | Margin | Jockey | Winner (Runner-up) |
|---|---|---|---|---|---|---|---|---|---|---|---|---|
2008 – three-year-old season
| Mar 9 | 3YO debut | | 1600m | Turf | Firm | Hanshin | 16 | 3rd | 1:37.9 | -0.3 | Tetsuzō Satō | Agnes Minuet |
| Mar 29 | 3YO maiden | | 1400m | Turf | Firm | Hanshin | 18 | 2nd | 1:23.0 | 0.0 | Tetsuzō Satō | Blast Off |
| Apr 20 | 3YO maiden | | 1800m | Turf | Heavy | Fukushima | 16 | 5th | 1:54.7 | 0.6 | Eiji Nakadate | Southern General |
| May 3 | 3YO maiden | | 1600m | Turf | Firm | Kyoto | 14 | 6th | 1:35.6 | 0.6 | Tetsuzō Satō | Tagano Erushiko |
| Jun 21 | 3YO maiden | | 1400m | Turf | Good | Hanshin | 17 | 2nd | 1:22.7 | 0.4 | Tetsuzō Satō | Tamamo Nice Play |
| Jul 20 | 3YO maiden | | 1200m | Turf | Firm | Kokura | 18 | 1st | 1:08.5 | 0.0 | Tetsuzō Satō | (Danon Perth) |
| Aug 10 | Akiyoshidai Tokubetsu | ALW (1W) | 1200m | Turf | Firm | Kokura | 18 | 7th | 1:09.2 | 0.5 | Tetsuzō Satō | Fixias |
| Aug 30 | 3YO maiden | | 1700m | Dirt | Good | Kokura | 16 | 1st | 1:42.4 | -1.1 | Kōichi Tsunoda | (Professional) |
| Sep 27 | Nishiwaki Tokubetsu | ALW (2W) | 1800m | Dirt | Fast | Hanshin | 15 | 1st | 1:51.6 | -0.3 | Tetsuzō Satō | (Clean) |
| Nov 2 | Kinshu Stakes | ALW (3W) | 1600m | Dirt | Fast | Tokyo | 16 | 1st | 1:35.3 | -0.8 | Masami Matsuoka | (Epsom Auron) |
| Nov 24 | Topaz Stakes | OP | 1800m | Dirt | Good | Kyoto | 16 | 1st | 1:50.8 | -0.3 | Tetsuzō Satō | (Dark Message) |
2009 – four-year-old season
| Jan 25 | Heian Stakes | G3 | 1800m | Dirt | Good | Kyoto | 16 | 2nd | 1:50.4 | 0.0 | Tetsuzō Satō | Wonder Speed |
| Feb 22 | February Stakes | G1 | 1600m | Dirt | Good | Tokyo | 16 | 4th | 1:34.8 | 0.2 | Tetsuzō Satō | Success Brocken |
| Mar 29 | March Stakes | G3 | 1800m | Dirt | Fast | Nakayama | 16 | 1st | 1:51.9 | -0.2 | Masami Matsuoka | (Daisho Jet) |
| May 5 | Kashiwa Kinen | Jpn1 | 1600m | Dirt | Sloppy | Funabashi | 13 | 1st | 1:35.9 | -0.1 | Tetsuzō Satō | (Kane Hekili) |
| Oct 12 | Mile Championship Nambu Hai | Jpn1 | 1600m | Dirt | Fast | Morioka | 15 | 1st | 1:35.4 | -0.7 | Tetsuzō Satō | (Success Brocken) |
| Dec 6 | Champions Cup | G1 | 1800m | Dirt | Fast | Hanshin | 16 | 1st | 1:49.9 | -0.6 | Tetsuzō Satō | (Silk Mobius) |
2010 – five-year-old season
| Feb 21 | February Stakes | G1 | 1600m | Dirt | Fast | Tokyo | 16 | 1st | 1:34.9 | -0.4 | Tetsuzō Satō | (Testa Matta) |
| May 5 | Kashiwa Kinen | Jpn1 | 1600m | Dirt | Fast | Funabashi | 14 | 1st | 1:36.8 | -0.2 | Tetsuzō Satō | (Furioso) |
| Oct 11 | Mile Championship Nambu Hai | Jpn1 | 1600m | Dirt | Good | Morioka | 12 | 2nd | 1:35.3 | 0.5 | Tetsuzō Satō | Oro Meister |
| Nov 6 | Breeders Cup Classic | G1 | 1 1/4 miles | Dirt | Fast | Churchill Downs | 11 | 10th | – | – | Tetsuzō Satō | Blame |
2011 – six-year-old season
| Mar 21 | Nagoya Daishoten | Jpn2 | 1900m | Dirt | Muddy | Nagoya | 12 | 1st | R1:58.4 | -0.4 | Tetsuzō Satō | (Wonder Acute) |
| May 5 | Kashiwa Kinen | Jpn1 | 1600m | Dirt | Good | Funabashi | 13 | 3rd | 1:38.6 | 0.4 | Tetsuzō Satō | Furioso |
| Jun 29 | Teio Sho | Jpn1 | 2000m | Dirt | Fast | Ohi | 11 | 2nd | 2:02.9 | 1.8 | Tetsuzō Satō | Smart Falcon |
| Oct 10 | Mile Championship Nambu Hai | Jpn1 | 1600m | Dirt | Fast | Tokyo | 15 | 4th | 1:35.1 | 0.3 | Masami Matsuoka | Transcend |
| Nov 6 | Miyako Stakes | G3 | 1800m | Dirt | Good | Kyoto | 15 | 1st | 1:48.4 | -0.6 | Tetsuzō Satō | (Tosho Freak) |
| Dec 4 | Champions Cup | G1 | 1800m | Dirt | Fast | Hanshin | 16 | 3rd | 1:50.9 | 0.3 | Tetsuzō Satō | Transcend |
2012 – seven-year-old season
| Jan 22 | Heian Stakes | G3 | 1800m | Dirt | Muddy | Kyoto | 16 | 2nd | 1:48.3 | 0.2 | Tetsuzō Satō | Hiraboku King |
| Feb 19 | February Stakes | G1 | 1600m | Dirt | Fast | Tokyo | 16 | 5th | 1:36.0 | 0.6 | Yutaka Take | Testa Matta |
| May 2 | Kashiwa Kinen | Jpn1 | 1600m | Dirt | Sloppy | Tokyo | 13 | 1st | 1:36.5 | -0.5 | Tetsuzō Satō | (Furioso) |
| Jun 27 | Teio Sho | Jpn1 | 2000m | Dirt | Fast | Ohi | 13 | 2nd | 2:03.7 | 0.7 | Tetsuzō Satō | Gold Blitz |
| Aug 25 | Elm Stakes | G3 | 1700m | Dirt | Fast | Sapporo | 11 | 2nd | 1:42.2 | 0.0 | Tetsuzō Satō | Roman Legend |
| Oct 8 | Mile Championship Nambu Hai | Jpn1 | 1600m | Dirt | Fast | Morioka | 13 | 1st | 1:35.9 | -0.6 | Tetsuzō Satō | (Daisho Jet) |
| Dec 2 | Champions Cup | G1 | 1800m | Dirt | Fast | Hanshin | 16 | 10th | 1:50.4 | 1.6 | Yutaka Take | Nihonpiro Ours |
| Dec 29 | Tokyo Daishoten | G1 | 2000m | Dirt | Sloppy | Ohi | 12 | 5th | 2:07.6 | 1.7 | Masami Matsuoka | Roman Legend |
2013 – eight-year-old season
| Feb 17 | February Stakes | G1 | 1600m | Dirt | Fast | Tokyo | 16 | 2nd | 1:35.2 | 0.1 | Masami Matsuoka | Grape Brandy |
| May 6 | Kashiwa Kinen | Jpn1 | 1600m | Dirt | Fast | Funabashi | 11 | 2nd | 1:38.1 | 0.3 | Suguru Hamanaka | Hokko Tarumae |
| Oct 14 | Mile Championship Nambu Hai | Jpn1 | 1600m | Dirt | Fast | Morioka | 13 | 1st | 1:34.1 | -0.2 | Hiroki Goto | (Hokko Tarumae) |
| Nov 4 | Japan Breeding Farms' Cup Sprint | Jpn1 | 1400m | Dirt | Muddy | Kanazawa | 12 | 1st | 1:27.1 | -0.3 | Hiroki Goto | (Dream Valentino) |
| Dec 1 | Champions Cup | G1 | 1800m | Dirt | Fast | Hanshin | 16 | 7th | 1:51.4 | 1.0 | Hiroki Goto | Belshazzar |

- R indicated that it was a record run
- All Jpn graded races are labeled as "Listed" in international scale.

== Pedigree ==
Pedigree of Espoir City (JPN), chestnut stallion, 2005
| Sire Gold Allure (JPN) b. 1999 | Sunday Silence (USA) b. 1986 | Halo | Hail To Reason |
| Sire Gold Allure (JPN) b. 1999 | Sunday Silence (USA) b. 1986 | Halo | Cosmah |
| Sire Gold Allure (JPN) b. 1999 | Sunday Silence (USA) b. 1986 | Wishing Well | Understanding |
| Sire Gold Allure (JPN) b. 1999 | Sunday Silence (USA) b. 1986 | Wishing Well | Mountain Flower |
| Sire Gold Allure (JPN) b. 1999 | Nikiya (USA) b. 1993 | Nureyev | Northern Dancer |
| Sire Gold Allure (JPN) b. 1999 | Nikiya (USA) b. 1993 | Nureyev | Special |
| Sire Gold Allure (JPN) b. 1999 | Nikiya (USA) b. 1993 | Reluctant Guest | Hostage |
| Sire Gold Allure (JPN) b. 1999 | Nikiya (USA) b. 1993 | Reluctant Guest | Vaguely Royal |
| Dam Eminent City (JPN) b. 1998 | Brian's Time (USA) b. 1985 | Roberto | Hail To Reason |
| Dam Eminent City (JPN) b. 1998 | Brian's Time (USA) b. 1985 | Roberto | Bramalea |
| Dam Eminent City (JPN) b. 1998 | Brian's Time (USA) b. 1985 | Kelley's Day | Graustark |
| Dam Eminent City (JPN) b. 1998 | Brian's Time (USA) b. 1985 | Kelley's Day | Golden Trail |
| Dam Eminent City (JPN) b. 1998 | Hepburn City (JPN) b. 1990 | Bravest Roman | Never Bend |
| Dam Eminent City (JPN) b. 1998 | Hepburn City (JPN) b. 1990 | Bravest Roman | Roman Song |
| Dam Eminent City (JPN) b. 1998 | Hepburn City (JPN) b. 1990 | Compal City | Traffic |
| Dam Eminent City (JPN) b. 1998 | Hepburn City (JPN) b. 1990 | Compal City | Rinnes |
