= Kashiwa Kinen =

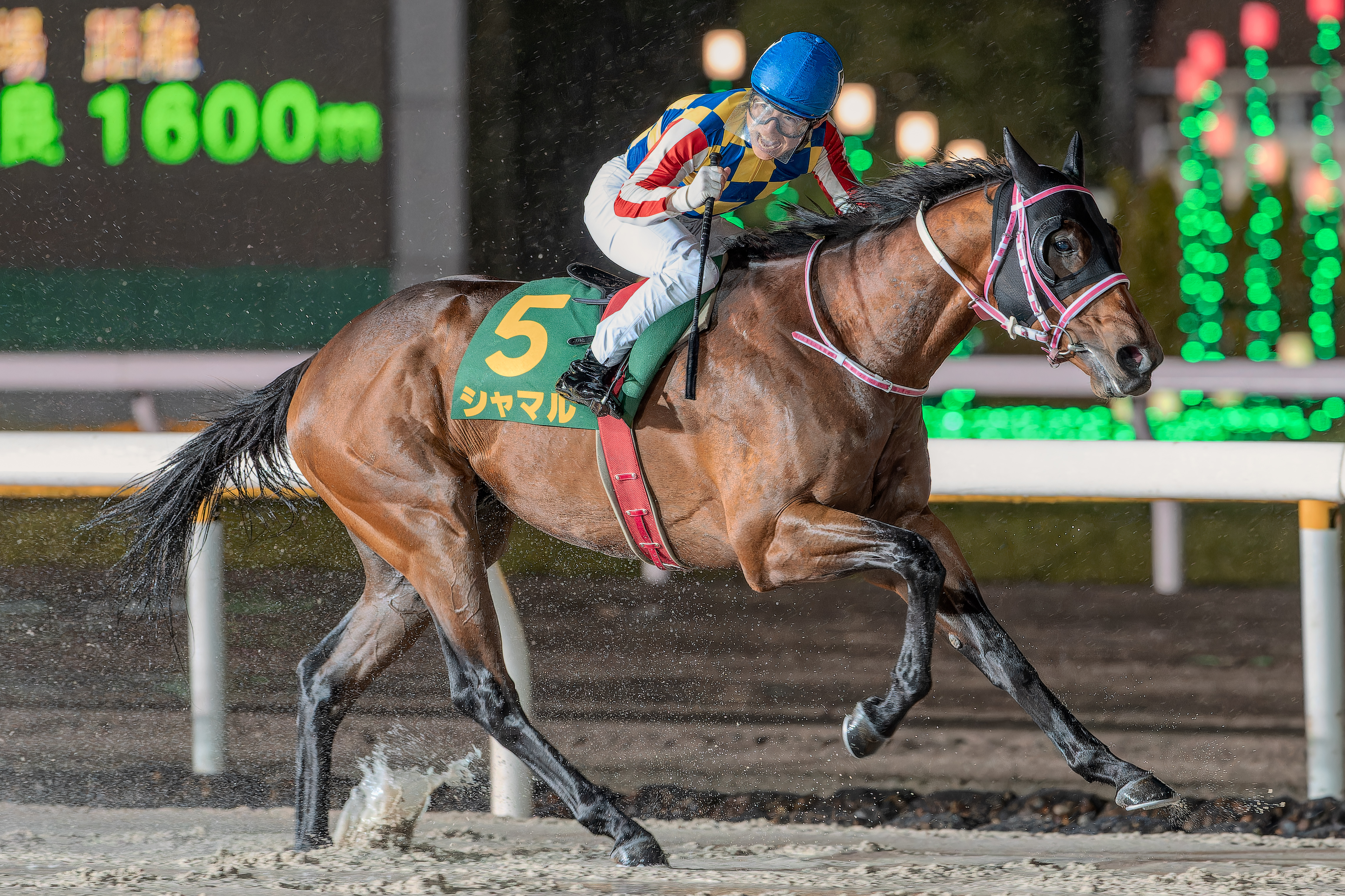
- 2024 Kashiwa Kinen; Winner, Shamal; Jockey, Haruhiko Kawasu
- Class: Domestic Grade I (JpnI)
- Location: Funabashi Racecourse, Funabashi, Chiba
- Inaugurated: 1978
- Race type: Thoroughbred Flat racing

Race information
- Distance: 1,600 meters (About 8 furlongs)
- Surface: Dirt
- Track: Left-handed
- Qualification: 4-y-o & Up
- Weight: 4-y-o & up horses & geldings 57kg / 4-y-o & up mares 55 kg
- Purse: ¥ 136,000,000 (as of 2026); 1st: ¥ 80,000,000; 2nd: ¥ 28,000,000; 3rd: ¥ 16,000,000

The Kashiwa Kinen (かしわ記念; Kashiwa Memorial) is a Japanese thoroughbred horse race run on dirt track for four years old and above. It is run over a distance of 1,600 meters (about 8 furlongs) at Funabashi Racecourse during the period known as Golden Week from the end of April to the beginning of May.

The Funabashi Racecourse is located in Funabashi, Chiba, but the race was named after the Kashiwa Racecourse (柏競馬場), which was located in Toyoshiki, Kashiwa City. The race began as a non-grade race in 1978, when its distance was 1,800 meters. In 1997, it was graded Domestic Grade 3, and in 2002, elevated to Domestic Grade 2. Finally, after three years, it was graded Domestic Grade 1 race. It is considered "the dirt mile championship in spring".

The top two finishers are granted the right to participate in the Teio Sho, if they are not coming from Japan Racing Association (JRA).

== Records ==
Most successful horses (3 wins):

- Espoir City – 2009, 2010, 2012
- Copano Rickey – 2014, 2016, 2017

== Winners since 2000 ==
| Year | Winner | Age | Jockey | Trainer | Owner | Organization | Time |
|---|---|---|---|---|---|---|---|
| 2000 | Be My Nakayama | 6 | Yuichi Shikato | Keiji Takaichi | Nakayama Bokujyo Ltd. | JRA | 1:40.8 |
| 2001 | Tamamo Strong | 6 | Takao Koike | Masao Sato | Tamamo Co. | JRA | 1:38.1 |
| 2002 | Toshin Blizzard | 4 | Takayuki Ishizaki | Kenji Sato | Eiichi Izumi | Funabashi | 1:36.5 |
| 2003 | Starring Rose | 6 | Yuichi Fukunaga | Shuji Kitahashi | Kyouei co. | JRA | 1:38.2 |
| 2004 | Nike a Delight | 4 | Takayuki Ishizaki | Ryuichi Degawa | Sumi Ono | Funabashi | 1:39.7 |
| 2005 | Strong Blood | 6 | Hiroyuki Uchida | Sueo Masuzawa | Atsushi Muraki | JRA | 1:37.9 |
| 2006 | Adjudi Mitsuo | 5 | Hiroyuki Uchida | Masayuki Kawashima | Masao Orido | Funabashi | 1:38.6 |
| 2007 | Blue Concorde | 7 | Hideaki Miyuki | Toshiyuki Hattori | Ogifushi Racing Club Co. | JRA | 1:37.4 |
| 2008 | Bonneville Record | 6 | Fumio Matoba | Masahiro Horii | Kiyoshi Shioda | JRA | 1:37.6 |
| 2009 | Espoir City | 4 | Tetsuzo Sato | Akio Adachi | Yushun Horse Club Co. | JRA | 1:35.9 |
| 2010 | Espoir City | 5 | Tetsuzo Sato | Akio Adachi | Yushun Horse Club Co. | JRA | 1:36.8 |
| 2011 | Furioso | 7 | Keita Tosaki | Masayuki Kawashima | Darley Japan K.K. | Funabashi | 1:38.2 |
| 2012 | Espoir City | 7 | Tetsuzo Sato | Akio Adachi | Yushun Horse Club Co. | JRA | 1:36.5 |
| 2013 | Hokko Tarumae | 4 | Hideaki Miyuki | Katsuichi Nishiura | Koichi Yabe | JRA | 1:37.8 |
| 2014 | Copano Rickey | 4 | Hironobu Tanabe | Akira Murayama | Sachiaki Kobayashi | JRA | 1:39.2 |
| 2015 | Wonder Acute | 9 | Ryuji Wada | Masao Sato | Nobuyuki Yamamoto | JRA | 1:37.4 |
| 2016 | Copano Rickey | 6 | Yutaka Take | Akira Murayama | Sachiaki Kobayashi | JRA | 1:39.2 |
| 2017 | Copano Rickey | 7 | Yutaka Take | Akira Murayama | Sachiaki Kobayashi | JRA | 1:39.9 |
| 2018 | Gold Dream | 5 | Christophe Lemaire | Osamu Hirata | Katsumi Yoshida | JRA | 1:39.2 |
| 2019 | Gold Dream | 6 | Christophe Lemaire | Osamu Hirata | Katsumi Yoshida | JRA | 1:40.2 |
| 2020 | Wide Pharaoh | 4 | Yuichi Fukunaga | Katsuhiko Sumii | Masanobu Habata | JRA | 1:38.6 |
| 2021 | Casino Fountain | 5 | Akira Harita | Takayuki Yamashita | Kosei Yoshihashi | Funabashi | 1:39.3 |
| 2022 | Shonan Nadeshiko | 5 | Hayato Yoshida | Naosuke Sugai | Tetsuhide Kunimoto | JRA | 1:38.9 |
| 2023 | Meisho Hario | 6 | Suguru Hamanaka | Inao Okada | Yoshio Matsumoto | JRA | 1:39.3 |
| 2024 | Shamal | 6 | Haruhiko Kawasu | Takeshi Matsushita | Toshiya Kanayama | JRA | 1:39.0 |
| 2025 | Shamal | 7 | Haruhiko Kawasu | Takeshi Matsushita | Toshiya Kanayama | JRA | 1:39.2 |
| 2026 | Wilson Tesoro | 7 | Yuga Kawada | Noboru Takagi | Ryotokuji Kenji Holdings Co.,Ltd. | JRA | 1:38.6 |
