= Japan Breeding Farms' Cup Sprint =

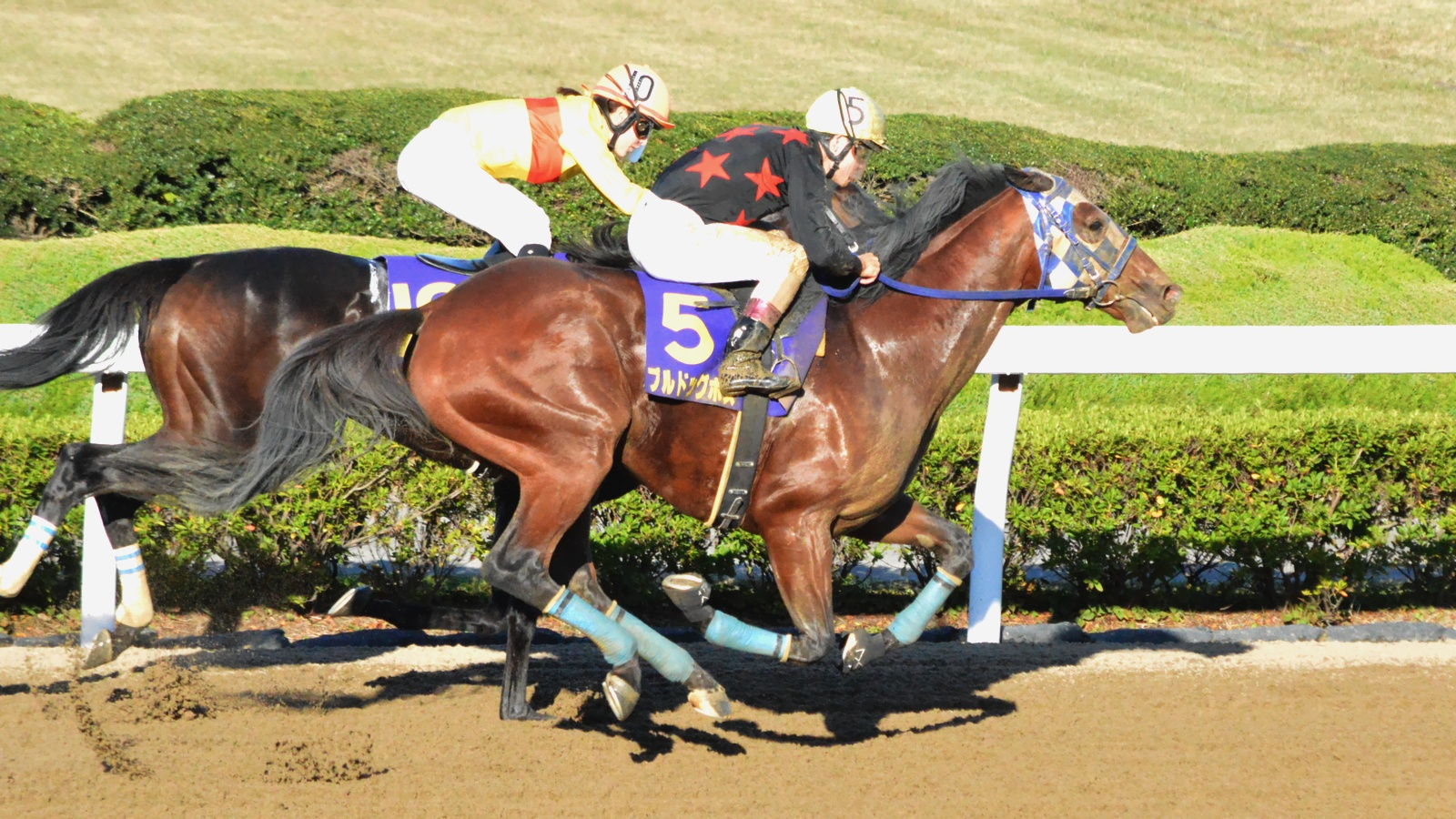
- 2019 Japan Breeding Farms' Cup Sprint
- Class: Domestic Grade I (JpnI)
- Location: Changes yearly
- Inaugurated: 2001
- Race type: Thoroughbred Flat racing

Race information
- Distance: Changes yearly
- Surface: Dirt
- Qualification: 3-y-o & Up
- Weight: 3-y-o horses & geldings 55kg/mares 53kg 4-y-o & up horses & geldings 57kg / mares 55 kg
- Purse: ¥136,000,000 (as of 2026); 1st: ¥ 80,000,000; 2nd: ¥ 25,600,000; 3rd: ¥ 14,400,000

Japan Breeding Farms' Cup Sprint (ジャパンブリーディングファームズカップスプリント) is a Japanese annual race held on "JBC day", which is usually November 3, or the national holiday Culture Day. This race and the JBC Classic were started in 2001. These were established following the American Breeders' Cup.

As of 2025, only five horses that have won the race belong to in National Association of Racing (NAR), the organization supervising horseracing administrated by the local government. The rest of the winners belong to the JRA.

There is no other domestic or international grade 1 sprint race on dirt in Japan other than this race.

JBC races are held on various racetracks, so its distance is changed yearly like the rest of the races held in JBC day.

== Winners ==
Year	Winner	Age	Jockey	Trainer	Owner	Organization	Time	Racecourse	Distance
2001	Nobo Jack	4	Masayoshi Ebina	Hideyuki Mori	Ikehata Ltd.	JRA	1:11.1	Oi	1,200 meters
2002	Starring Rose	5	Yuichi Fukunaga	Shuji Kitahashi	Kyouei Ltd.	JRA	1:11.4	Morioka	1,200 meters
2003	South Vigorous	7	Yoshitomi Shibata	Yoshiyasu Takahashi	Hisashi Namba	JRA	1:09.7	Oi	1,190 meters
2004	Meiner Select	5	Yutaka Take	Hitoshi Nakamura	Thoroughbred Club Ruffian	JRA	1:10.6	Oi	1,200 meters
2005	Blue Concorde	5	Hideaki Miyuki	Toshiyuki Hattori	Ogifushi Racing Club.	JRA	1:25.3	Nagoya	1,400 meters
2006*	Blue Concorde	6	Hideaki Miyuki	Toshiyuki Hattori	Ogifushi Racing Club.	JRA	1:39.6	Kawasaki	1,600 meters
2007	Fujino Wave	5	Norifumi Mikamoto	Saburou Takahashi	Taishi Sogo Planning	Oi	1:11.0	Oi	1,200 meters
2008	Bamboo Yell	5	Masami Matsuoka	Akio Adachi	Bamaoo Bokujyo Ltd.	JRA	1:25.6	Sonoda	1,400 meters
2009	Suni	3	Yuga Kawada	Naohiro Yoshida	Kazumi Yoshida	JRA	1:25.9	Nagoya	1,400 meters
2010	Summer Wind	5	Yusuke Fujioka	Yasushi Shono	Hidaka Breeders Union	JRA	0:57.6	Funabashi	1,000 meters
2011	Suni	5	Yuga Kawada	Naohiro Yoshida	Kazumi Yoshida	JRA	1:10.1	Oi	1,200 meters
2012	Taisei Legend	5	Hiroyuki Uchida	Yoshito Yahagi	Seihou Tanaka	JRA	1:26.6	Kawasaki	1,400 meters
2013	Espoir City	8	Hiroki Goto	Akio Adachi	Yushun Horse Club	JRA	1:27.1	Kanazawa	1,400 meters
2014	Dream Valentino	7	Yasunari Iwata	Tadashi Kayou	Saison Racehorse	JRA	1:09.0	Morioka	1,200 meters
2015	Corin Berry	4	Kohei Matsuyama	Jiro Ono	Keiko Ito	JRA	1:10.9	Oi	1,200 meters
2016	Danon Legend	6	Mirco Demuro	Akira Murayama	Danox	JRA	1:27.2	Kawasaki	1,400 meters
2017	Nishiken Mononofu	6	Norihiro Yokoyama	Yasushi Shoji	Tsuru Nishimori	JRA	1:11.4	Oi	1,200 meters
2018	Graceful Leap	8	Christophe Lemaire	Shinsuke Hashimoto	Shinji Maeda	JRA	1:10.4	Kyoto	1,200 meters
2019	Bulldog Boss	7	Norifumi Mikamoto	Satoshi Kokubo	Him Rock Racing Holdings Co., Ltd.	Urawa	1:24.9	Urawa	1,400 meters
2020	Sabuno Junior	6	Takayuki Yano	Chiaki Hori	Saburo Nakagawa	Oi	1:10.7	Oi	1,200 meters
2021	Red le Zele	5	Yuga Kawada	Takayuki Yasuda	TokyoHorseRacing Co. Ltd	JRA	1:24.6	Kanazawa	1,400 meters
2022	Dancing Prince	5	Kousei Miura	Keisuke Miyata	Chizu Yoshida	JRA	1:09.1	Morioka	1,200 meters
2023	Igniter	5	Tsubasa Sasagawa	Masashi Atarashi	Yoshiki Noda	Hyogo	1:12.0	Oi	1,200 meters
2024	Tagano Beauty	7	Shu Ishibashi	Masato Nishizono	Ryoji Yagi	JRA	1:26.8	Saga	1,400 meters
2025	Fern Hill	6	Tsubasa Sasagawa	Katsunori Arayama	Kanayama Holdings Co. Ltd.	Oi	0:58.8	Funabashi	1,000 meters
2026	Meisho Hachiro	4	Hiroto Yoshihara	Yuichi Fukunaga	Yoshitaka Matsumoto	JRA	1:25.5	Kanazawa	1,400 meters

- This race was held as JBC Mile.
