= Japan Breeding Farms' Cup Classic =

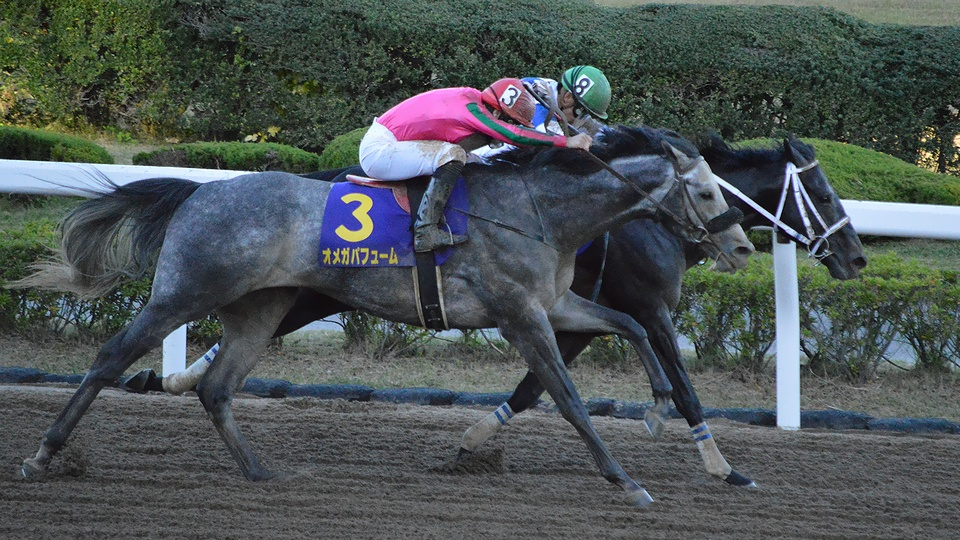
- Chuwa Wizard winning the JBC Classic in 2019
- Class: Domestic Grade I (JpnI)
- Location: Changes yearly
- Inaugurated: October 31, 2001
- Race type: Thoroughbred Flat racing

Race information
- Distance: Changes yearly
- Surface: Dirt
- Qualification: 3-y-o & Up
- Weight: 3-y-o horses & geldings 55kg/fillies 53kg 4-y-o & up horses & geldings 57kg / mares 55 kg
- Purse: ¥170,000,000 (as of 2026); 1st: ¥ 100,000,000; 2nd: ¥ 32,000,000; 3rd: ¥ 18,000,000

Japan Breeding Farms' Cup Classic (ジャパンブリーディングファームズカップクラシック) is an annual race that is usually held on November 3, the national holiday Culture Day. This race and the JBC Sprint were started in 2001, following the American Breeders' Cup, though the JBC has only two category races. In 2011, JBC Lady's Classic was added for fillies and mares.

The track is changed yearly like the American Breeders' Cup, so that the distances may differ. The distance was 2,000 meters from 2001 to 2004, in 2007 and 2011; 1,900 meters in 2005 and 2009; 2,100 meters in 2006; 1,870 meters in 2008; and 1800 meters in 2010. In both 2012 and the following year, it will be 2,100 meters.

This is the highest-prized race in National Association of Racing (NAR), and the third highest-prized dirt event in Japan, following Champions Cup and February Stakes both organized by Japan Racing Association(JRA). Until 2011, the winner's prize was one hundred million yen. Although its prize money is high, this race is regarded as preparation for Champions Cup.

To date, the only horse to win this race that is not affiliated with the JRA was Mutually in 2021.

== Winners ==
Year	Winner	Age	Jockey	Trainer	Owner	Organization	Time	Racecourse	Distance
2001	Regular Member	4	Mikio Matsunaga	Yamamoto Syouji	North Hills Ltd.	JRA	2:05.2	Oi	2,000 meters
2002	Admire Don	3	Shinji Fujita	Hiroyoshi Matsuda	Riichi Kondo	JRA	2:05.6	Morioka	2,000 meters
2003	Admire Don	4	Katsumi Ando	Hiroyoshi Matsuda	Riichi Kondo	JRA	2:04.3	Oi	2,000 meters
2004	Admire Don	5	Katsumi Ando	Hiroyoshi Matsuda	Riichi Kondo	JRA	2:02.4	Oi	2,000 meters
2005	Time Paradox	7	Yutaka Take	Hiroyoshi Matsuda	Shadai Racing Ltd.	JRA	2:00.9	Nagoya	1,900 meters
2006	Time Paradox	8	Yasunari Iwata	Hiroyoshi Matsuda	Shadai Racing Ltd.	JRA	2:16.1	Kawasaki	2,100 meters
2007	Vermilion	5	Yutaka Take	Sei Ishizaka	Sunday Racing Ltd.	JRA	2:04.8	Oi	2,000 meters
2008	Vermilion	6	Yutaka Take	Sei Ishizaka	Sunday Racing Ltd.	JRA	1:56.7	Sonoda	1,870 meters
2009	Vermilion	7	Yutaka Take	Sei Ishizaka	Sunday Racing Ltd.	JRA	2:00.2	Nagoya	1,900 meters
2010	Smart Falcon	5	Yutaka Take	Ken Kozaki	Touru Okawa	JRA	1:49.9	Funabashi	1,800 meters
2011	Smart Falcon	6	Yutaka Take	Ken Kozaki	Touru Okawa	JRA	2:02.1	Oi	2,000 meters
2012	Wonder Acute	6	Ryuji Wada	Masao Sato	Nobuyuki Yamamoto	JRA	2:12.5	Kawasaki	2,100 meters
2013	Hokko Tarumae	4	Hideaki Miyuki	Katsuichi Nishiura	Koichi Yabe	JRA	2:12.6	Kanazawa	2,100 meters
2014	Copano Rickey	4	Hironobu Tanabe	Akira Murayama	Sachiaki Kobayashi	JRA	2:00.8	Morioka	2,000 meters
2015	Copano Rickey	5	Yutaka Take	Akira Murayama	Sachiaki Kobayashi	JRA	2:04.4	Oi	2,000 meters
2016	Awardee	6	Yutaka Take	Mikio Matsunaga	Koji Maeda	JRA	2:15.3	Kawasaki	2,100 meters
2017	Sound True	7	Takuya Ono	Noboru Takagi	Hiroshi Yamada	JRA	2:04.5	Oi	2,000 meters
2018	K T Brave	5	Yuichi Fukunaga	Haruki Sugiyama	Kazuyoshi Takimoto	JRA	1:56.7	Kyoto	1,900 meters
2019	Chuwa Wizard	4	Yuga Kawada	Ryuji Okubo	Shinobu Nakanishi	JRA	2:06.1	Urawa	2,000 meters
2020	Chrysoberyl	4	Yuga Kawada	Hidetaka Otonashi	U Carrot Farm	JRA	2:02.5	Oi	2,000 meters
2021	Mutually	5	Hiroto Yoshihara	Yoshiyuki Yano	Jotaro Ishise	Funabashi	2:13.1	Kanazawa	2,100 meters
2022	T O Keynes	5	Kohei Matsuyama	Daisuke Takayanagi	Tomoya Ozasa	JRA	2:02.1	Morioka	2,000 meters
2023	King's Sword	4	João Moreira	Ryo Terashima	Hidaka Breeders Union Co., Ltd.	JRA	2:05.1	Oi	2,000 meters
2024	Wilson Tesoro	5	Yuga Kawada	Hitoshi Kotegawa	Ryotokuji Kenji Holdings Co. Ltd.	JRA	2:08.0	Saga	2,000 meters
2025	Mikki Fight	4	Christophe Lemaire	Hiroyasu Tanaka	Mizuki Noda	JRA	1:52.0	Funabashi	1,800 meters
2026	Outrange	6	Kohei Matsuyama	Ryuji Okubo	Toshio Terada	JRA	2:11.3	Kanazawa	2,100 meters
