= Mile Championship Nambu Hai =

Japanese thoroughbred race

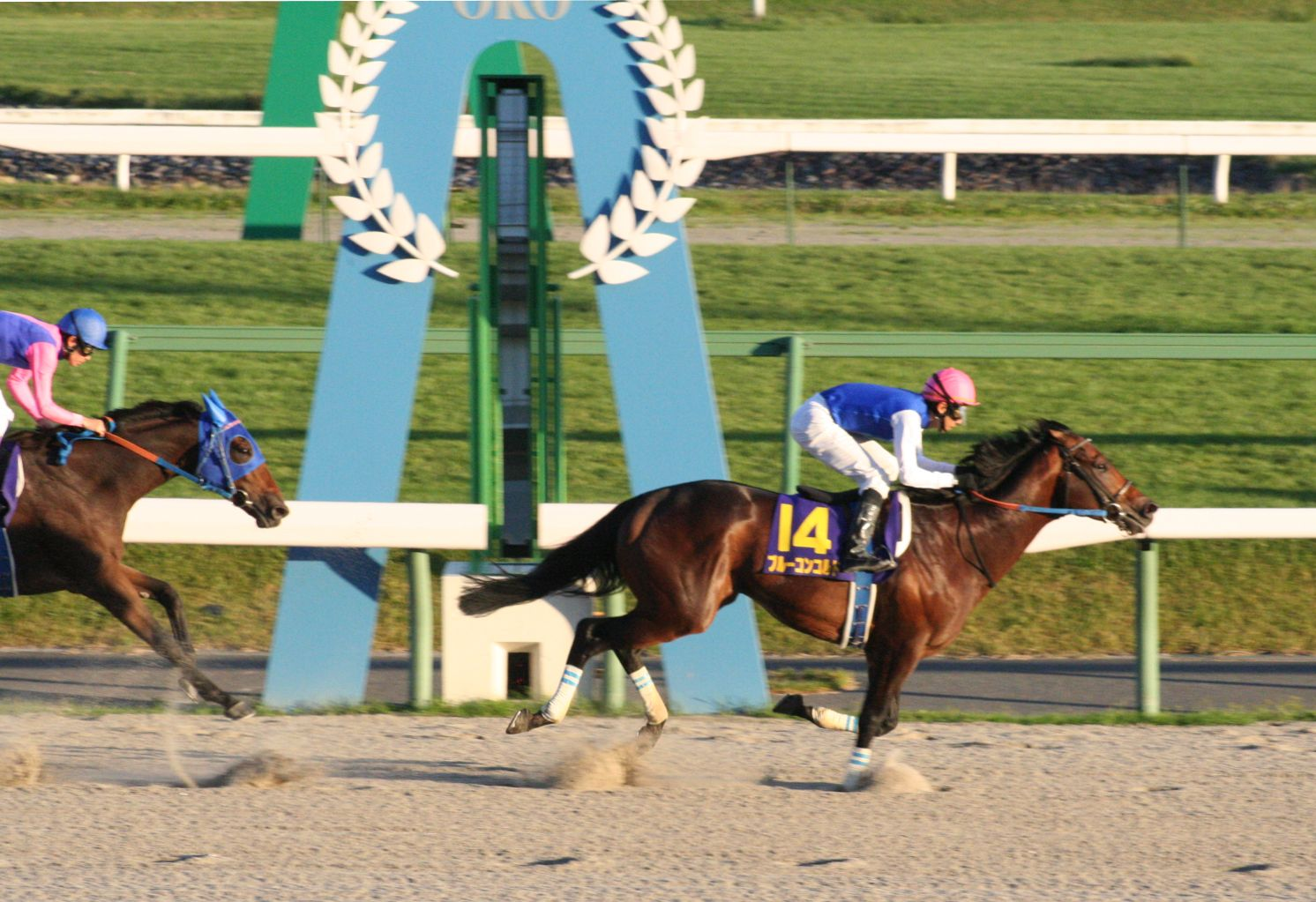
- 2008 Mile Championship Nambu Hai
- Class: Domestic Grade I (JpnI)
- Location: Morioka Racecourse
- Inaugurated: 1988
- Race type: Thoroughbred - Flat racing

Race information
- Distance: 1,600 meters
- Surface: Dirt
- Track: Left-handed
- Qualification: Three-years-old and up
- Weight: 55 kg (3yo); 57 kg (4yo+); Allowances; 2 kg for fillies and mares
- Purse: ¥140,000,000 (as of 2025); 1st: ¥ 80,000,000; 2nd: ¥ 28,000,000; 3rd: ¥ 16,000,000

The Mile Championship Nambu Hai (in Japanese: マイルチャンピオンシップ南部杯) is a Domestic Grade 1 race for thoroughbreds three-year-olds and above held at Morioka Racecourse in Japan.

The name of the race originates from the Nambu clan which ruled the Morioka Domain during the Edo period. The name and Nambu family crest are used with the approval of the 45th head of the Nambu clan, Toshiaki Nambu. The current head of the Nambu clan attends the award ceremony every year and awards the trophy to the winner.

== Race details ==
The race was originally known as the "Northern Japan Mile Championship", until it was changed to the current name in 1995. The race is run over 1600 meters on dirt.

The race took place at Mizusawa Racecourse from 1988 to 1995 before moving to Morioka. As part of showing support for the areas affected by the 2011 Tōhoku earthquake and tsunami, the race was held at Tokyo Racecourse that year.

The race is always held in October.

== Records ==
Speed record:

- 1:32.7 – Arctos (2020)

Most wins:

- 3 – Blue Concorde (2006, 2007, 2008)
- 3 – Espoir City (2009, 2012, 2013)

Most wins by a jockey:

- 5 - Isao Sugawara (1990, 1993, 1994, 1998, 2002)

== Winners ==
| Year | Winner | Age | Jockey | Trainer | Owner | Organization | Time |
|---|---|---|---|---|---|---|---|
| 1988 | Great Sir Pen | 7 | Tsutomu Kudo | Kazuyasu Watanabe | Katsutaro Mihara | Takasaki | 1:42.4 |
| 1989 | Daiko Galdan | 5 | Kenji Mito | Hiroshi Murayama | Tokio Kumakubo | Kaminoyama | 1:42.4 |
| 1990 | Great Hope | 5 | Isao Sugawara | Shigeyuki Konishi | Kikuo Onodera | Morioka | 1:40.0 |
| 1991 | Takeden Fighter | 6 | Mikiya Oeda | Tadao Sato | Kiichiro Akagawa | Niigata | 1:40.8 |
| 1992 | Takeden Mangetsu | 7 | Norio Hirasawa | Masami Hiraishi | Tokio Kumakubo | Utsunomiya | 1:42.0 |
| 1993 | Tokei Nisei | 7 | Isao Sugawara | Shigeyuki Konishi | Kikuo Onodera | Morioka | 1:39.8 |
| 1994 | Tokei Nisei | 8 | Isao Sugawara | Shigeyuki Konishi | Kikuo Onodera | Morioka | 1:39.5 |
| 1995 | Lively Mount | 5 | Mamoru Ishibashi | Fujio Shibata | Tetsuo Kato | JRA | 1:40.6 |
| 1996 | Hokuto Vega | 7 | Hitoshi Matoba | Takao Nakano | Kanamorimori Shoji K. | JRA | 1:38.3 |
| 1997 | Taiki Sherlock | 6 | Norihiro Yokoyama | Minoru Tsuchida | Taiki Farm Co. Ltd. | JRA | 1:36.2 |
| 1998 | Meisei Opera | 5 | Isao Sugawara | Shuichi Sasaki | Meisho Shoji Co. Ltd. | Mizusawa | 1:35.1 |
| 1999 | Nihon Pillow Jupiter | 5 | Yutaka Take | Tetsuya Meno | Hyakutaro Kobayashi | JRA | 1:38.4 |
| 2000 | Gold Tiara | 5 | Hiroki Goto | Kunihide Matsuda | Kazuko Yoshida | JRA | 1:38.3 |
| 2001 | Agnes Digital | 4 | Hirofumi Shii | Toshiaki Shirai | Takao Watanabe | JRA | 1:37.7 |
| 2002 | Toho Emperor | 6 | Isao Sugawara | Yotsumi Chiba | Toho Bussan Co. Ltd. | Mizusawa | 1:38.7 |
| 2003 | Admire Don | 4 | Katsumi Andō | Hiroyoshi Matsuda | Riichi Kondo | JRA | 1:35.4 |
| 2004 | Utopia | 4 | Norihiro Yokoyama | Kojiro Hashiguchi | Kaneko Makoto Holdings Co. Ltd. | JRA | 1:35.9 |
| 2005 | Utopia | 5 | Katsumi Andō | Kojiro Hashiguchi | Kaneko Makoto Holdings Co. Ltd. | JRA | 1:36.7 |
| 2006 | Blue Concorde | 6 | Hideaki Miyuki | Toshiyuki Hattori | Ogifushi Racing Club Co. Ltd. | JRA | 1:36.6 |
| 2007 | Blue Concorde | 7 | Hideaki Miyuki | Toshiyuki Hattori | Blue Management Co. Ltd. | JRA | 1:36.8 |
| 2008 | Blue Concorde | 8 | Hideaki Miyuki | Toshiyuki Hattori | Blue Management Co. Ltd. | JRA | 1:37.3 |
| 2009 | Espoir City | 4 | Tetsuzō Satō | Akio Adachi | Yushun Horse Co. Ltd. | JRA | 1:35.4 |
| 2010 | Oro Meister | 5 | Yutaka Yoshida | Yokichi Okubo | Sunday Racing Co. Ltd. | JRA | 1:34.8 |
| 2011 | Transcend | 5 | Shinji Fujita | Takayuki Yasuda | Koji Maeda | JRA | 1:34.8 |
| 2012 | Espoir City | 7 | Tetsuzō Satō | Akio Adachi | Yushun Horse Co. Ltd. | JRA | 1:35.9 |
| 2013 | Espoir City | 8 | Hiroki Goto | Akio Adachi | Yushun Horse Co. Ltd. | JRA | 1:35.1 |
| 2014 | Best Warrior | 4 | Keita Tosaki | Sei Ishizaka | Yukio Baba | JRA | 1:35.9 |
| 2015 | Best Warrior | 5 | Yuichi Fukunaga | Sei Ishizaka | Yukio Baba | JRA | 1:36.8 |
| 2016 | Copano Rickey | 6 | Hironobu Tanabe | Akira Murayama | Sachiaki Kobayashi | JRA | 1:33.5 |
| 2017 | Copano Rickey | 7 | Hironobu Tanabe | Akira Murayama | Sachiaki Kobayashi | JRA | 1:34.9 |
| 2018 | Le Vent Se Leve | 3 | Mirco Demuro | Kiyoshi Hagiwara | G1 Racing Co. Ltd. | JRA | 1:35.3 |
| 2019 | Sunrise Nova | 5 | Hiroto Yoshihara | Hidetaka Otonashi | Takao Matsuoka | JRA | 1:34.2 |
| 2020 | Arctos | 5 | Hironobu Tanabe | Toru Kurita | Koichiro Yamaguchi | JRA | 1:32.7 |
| 2021 | Arctos | 6 | Hironobu Tanabe | Toru Kurita | Koichiro Yamaguchi | JRA | 1:35.3 |
| 2022 | Cafe Pharoah | 5 | Yuichi Fukunaga | Noriyuki Hori | Koichi Nishikawa | JRA | 1:34.6 |
| 2023 | Lemon Pop | 5 | Ryusei Sakai | Hiroyasu Tanaka | Godolphin | JRA | 1:33.8 |
| 2024 | Lemon Pop | 6 | Ryusei Sakai | Hiroyasu Tanaka | Godolphin | JRA | 1:35.9 |
| 2025 | Wilson Tesoro | 6 | Yuga Kawada | Noboru Takagi | Ryotokuji Kenji Holdings Co. Ltd. | JRA | 1:34.3 |
| 2026 | Meisho Hachiro | 4 | Yoshihara Hiroto | Yuichi Fukunaga | Yoshitaka Matsumoto | JRA | 1:34.7 |

== See also ==
- Horse racing in Japan
- List of Japanese flat horse races
