= Teio Sho =

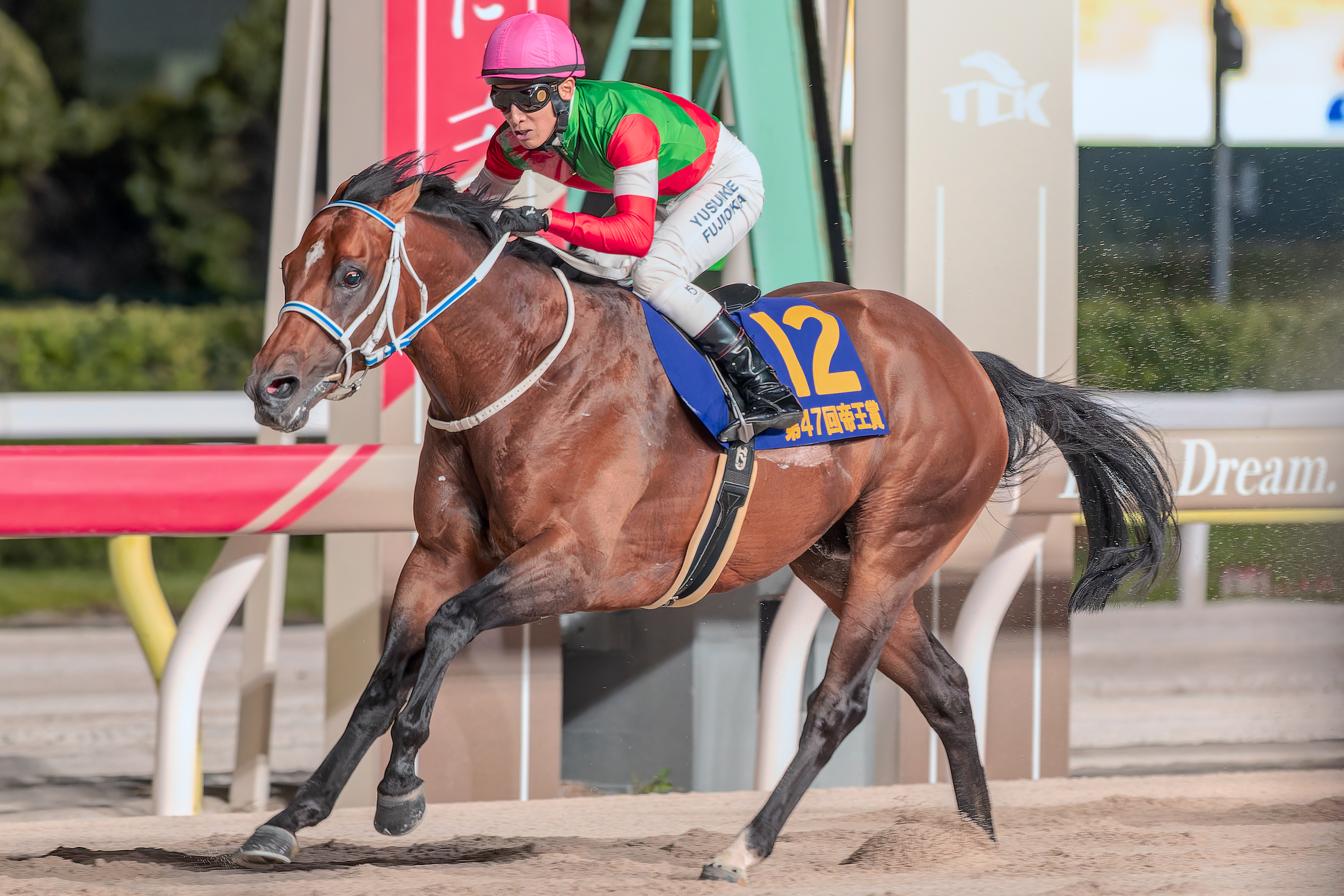
- 2024 Teio Sho winner, King's Sword
- Class: Domestic Grade I (Jpn I)
- Location: Ohi
- Inaugurated: 1978
- Race type: Thoroughbred Flat racing

Race information
- Distance: 2,000 meters
- Surface: Dirt
- Track: right-handed
- Qualification: 4-y-o & Up
- Weight: 4-y-o & up horses & geldings 57kg / mares 55 kg
- Purse: ¥ 136,000,000 (as of 2025); 1st: ¥ 80,000,000; 2nd: ¥ 28,000,000; 3rd: ¥ 16,000,000

The Teio Sho (帝王賞) is a Japanese domestic Grade 1 race for thoroughbred horses aged four years and over. This race began in 1978 as a spring championship race of southern Kanto region horseracing.

It was later opened to Japan Racing Association (JRA) horses in 1986. Then, there were few opportunities for JRA and National Association of Racing (NAR) horses to run in the same race, because JRA and NAR were individually operated. This trial promoted an expansion of exchanges between the two organizations. In 1997, it was graded as Domestic Grade 1.

The race is run over 2000 metres at Ohi Racecourse in late June. Hokuto Vega, Admire Don, Vermilion and Hokko Tarumae won the race before winning the JRA Award for Best Dirt Horse.

Most successful horses (2 wins):

- Champion Star – 1988, 1991
- Furioso – 2008, 2010
- Hokko Tarumae – 2013, 2015
- Meisho Hario – 2022, 2023
- Mikki Fight – 2025, 2026

== Winners since 2000 ==
Year	Winner	Age	Jockey	Trainer	Owner	Organization	Time
2000	Fast Friend	7	Masayoshi Ebina	Keiji Takaichi	Hiroaki Takezaki	JRA	2:05.6
2001	Makiba Sniper	6	Kent Desormeaux	Mitsuhiro Okabayashi	Tomoya Nitta	Funabashi	2:04.4
2002	Kanetsu Flueve	5	Mikio Matsunaga	Shyoji Yamamoto	Laurel Racing Co.	JRA	2:03.7
2003	Name Value	5	Takashi Sato	Masayuki Kawashima	Hino Bokujyou Ltd.	Funabashi	2:04.6
2004	Admire Don	5	Katsumi Ando	Matsuda Hiroyoshi	Riichi Kondo	JRA	2:04.0
2005	Time Paradox	7	Yutaka Take	Hiroyoshi Matsuda	Shadai Racehorse Ltd.	JRA	2:03.5
2006	Adjudi Mitsuo	5	Hiroyuki Uchida	Masayuki Kawashima	Masao Orido	Funabashi	2:02.1
2007	Bonneville Record	5	Fumio Mataba	Masahiro Horii	Kiyoshi Shioda	JRA	2:04.3
2008	Furioso	4	Keita Tosaki	Masayuki Kawashima	Darley Japan K.K.	Funabashi	2:04.7
2009	Vermilion	7	Yutaka Take	Sei Ishizaka	Sunday Racing Ltd.	JRA	2:03.6
2010	Furioso	6	Keita Tosaki	Masayuki Kawashima	Darley Japan K.K.	Funabashi	2:03.4
2011	Smart Falcon	6	Yutaka Take	Ken Kozaki	Toru Okawa	JRA	2:01.1
2012	Gold Blitz	5	Yuga Kawada	Naohiro Yoshida	U Carrot Farm	JRA	2:03.0
2013	Hokko Tarumae	4	Hideaki Miyuki	Katsuichi Nishiura	Koichi Yabe	JRA	2:03.0
2014	Wonder Acute	8	Yutaka Take	Masao Sato	Nobuyuki Yamamoto	JRA	2:03.5
2015	Hokko Tarumae	6	Hideaki Miyuki	Katsuichi Nishiura	Michiaki Yabe	JRA	2:02.7
2016	Copano Rickey	6	Yutaka Take	Akira Murayama	Sachiaki Kobayashi	JRA	2:03.5
2017	K T Brave	4	Yuichi Fukunaga	Tetsuya Meno	Okano Bokujo	JRA	2:04.4
2018	Gold Dream	5	Christophe Lemaire	Osamu Hirata	Katsumi Yoshida	JRA	2:04.2
2019	Omega Perfume	4	Damian Lane	Shogo Yasuda	Reiko Hara	JRA	2:04.4
2020	Chrysoberyl	4	Yuga Kawada	Hidetaka Otonashi	U Carrot Farm	JRA	2:05.3
2021	T O Keynes	4	Kohei Matsuyama	Shogo Yasuda	Tomoya Ozasa	JRA	2:02.7
2022	Meisho Hario	5	Suguru Hamanaka	Inao Okada	Yoshio Matsumoto	JRA	2:03.3
2023	Meisho Hario	6	Suguru Hamanaka	Inao Okada	Yoshio Matsumoto	JRA	2:01.9
2024	King's Sword	5	Yusuke Fujioka	Ryo Terashima	Hidaka Breeders Union Co. Ltd.	JRA	2:06.9
2025	Mikki Fight	4	Christophe Lemaire	Hiroyasu Tanaka	Mizuki Noda	JRA	2:03.1
2026	Mikki Fight	5	Keita Tosaki	Hiroyasu Tanaka	Mizuki Noda	JRA	2:02.8

== Past winners ==
Past winners include:

- 1978: Rose Jack
- 1979: Hatsu Mamoru
- 1980: Katsu R
- 1981: Azuma King
- 1982: Konan Ruby
- 1983: Trust Hawk
- 1984: Suzuyu
- 1985: Rocky Tiger
- 1986: Tom Count
- 1987: Tetsuno Kachidoki
- 1988: Champion Star
- 1989: Fate Northern
- 1990: Osaichi Bravest
- 1991: Champion Star
- 1992: Narita Hayabusa and Russian Gold (co-winners)
- 1993: Hashiru Shogun
- 1994: Stabilizer
- 1995: Lively Mount
- 1996: Hokuto Vega
- 1997: Concert Boy
- 1998: Abukuma Poro
- 1999: Meisei Opera
