= Funabashi Racecourse =

Horse racing venue in Funabashi, Chiba, Japan

Coordinates: 35°41′05″N 139°59′52″E

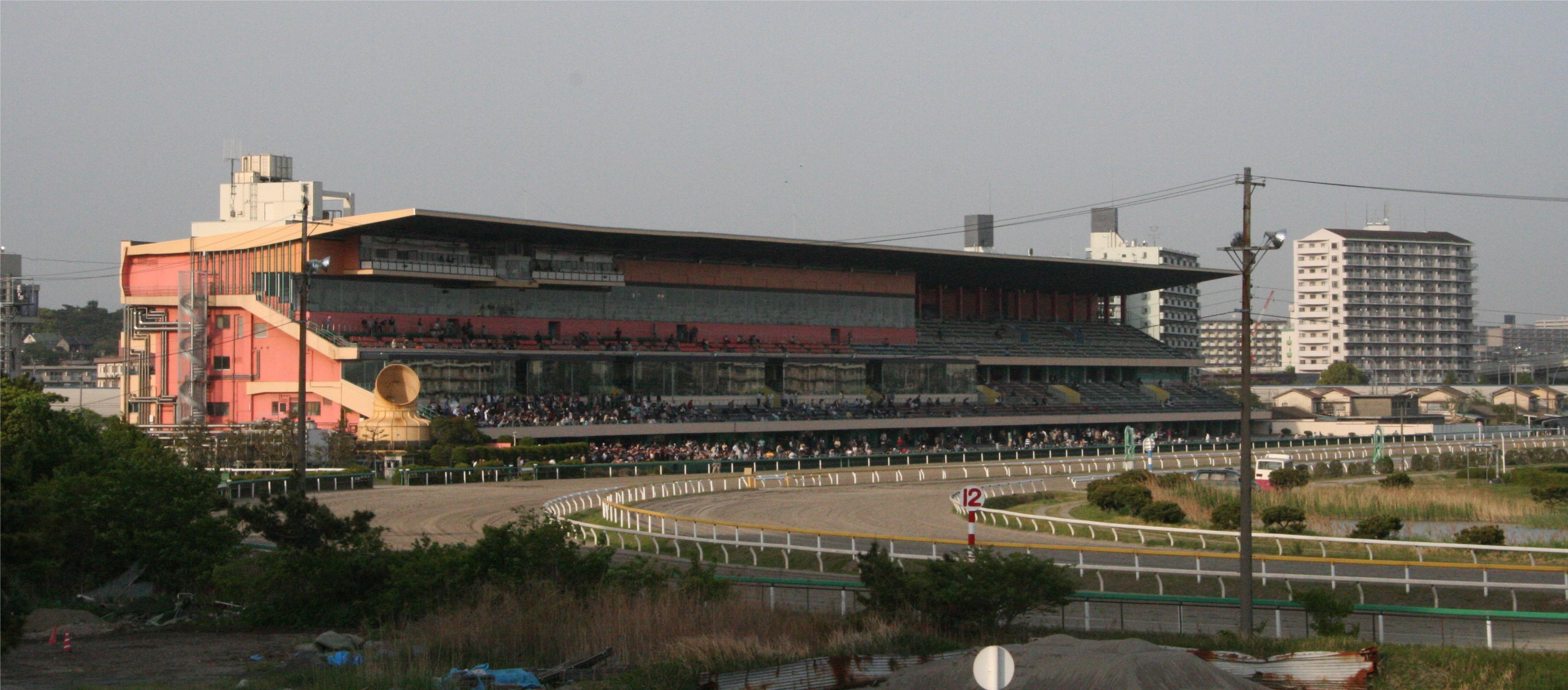
- Interactive map of Funabashi Racecourse
- Location: 2-1, Wakamatsu 1-chōme Funabashi, Chiba Prefecture, Japan
- Owned by: Chiba Prefecture Racing Association
- Date opened: August 1950
- Course type: Flat; Thoroughbred
- Notable races: Kashiwa Kinen

Funabashi Racecourse (船橋競馬場, Funabashi Keiba-jō) is located in Funabashi, Chiba, Japan. It is a left-handed (counter-clockwise) Flat racing track.

== Notable races ==
Month	Race	Distance	Age/Sex
JpnI
May.	Kashiwa Kinen	Dirt 1600m	4yo +
JpnII
Sep.	Nippon TV Hai	Dirt 1800m	3yo +
Mar.	Diolite Kinen	Dirt 2400m	3yo +
JpnIII
Jan.	Bluebird Cup	Dirt 1800m	3yo
Apr.	Marine Cup	Dirt 1600m	4yo + f
Dec.	Queen Sho	Dirt 1800m	3yo + f
