= Transcend (horse) =

Japanese racehorse

Transcend トランセンド
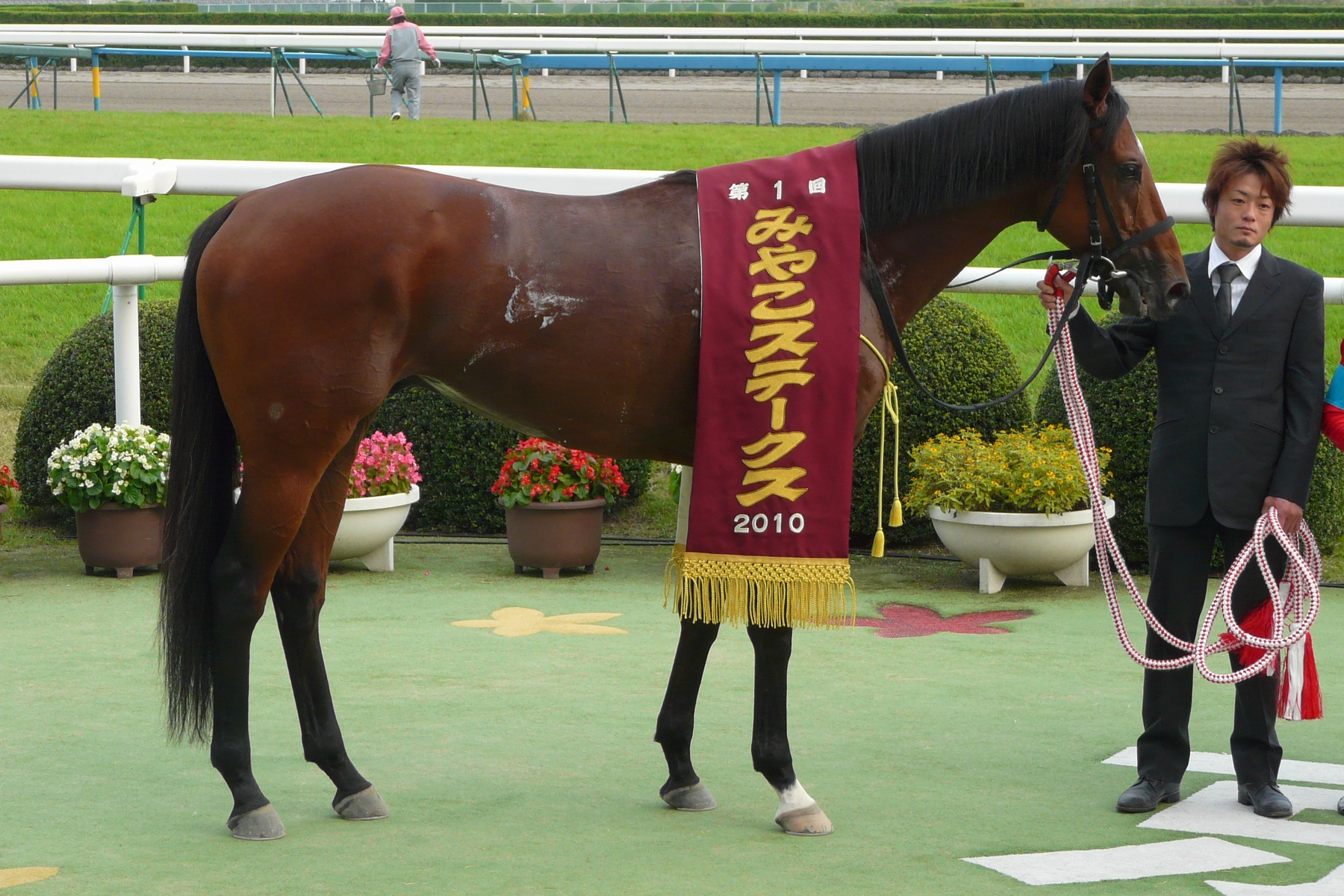
- Transcend at the award ceremony for the 2010 Miyako Stakes.
- Breed: Thoroughbred
- Sire: Wild Rush (USA)
- Grandsire: Wild Again (USA)
- Dam: Cinema Scope (JPN)
- Damsire: Tony Bin (IRE)
- Sex: Stallion
- Foaled: March 9, 2006 (age 20)
- Country: Japan
- Colour: Bay
- Breeder: North Hills Farm
- Owner: Koji Maeda
- Racing colours
- Trainer: Takayuki Yasuda
- Jockey: Shinji Fujita
- Record: 24: 10-5-1
- Earnings: ¥575,520,000 (equivalent to ¥639,000,000 in 2024)

Honors
- Miyako Stakes (2010); Japan Cup Dirt (2010, 2011); February Stakes (2011); Mile Championship Nambu Hai (2011)

Transcend (Japanese: トランセンド, Hepburn: Toransendo; foaled March 9, 2006) is a Japanese racehorse and stallion. His major victories include back-to-back wins in the Japan Cup Dirt in 2010 and 2011, as well as the 2011 February Stakes and the Mile Championship Nambu Hai. His name means "to transcend."

== Racing career ==
=== 2009: three-year-old season ===
Transcend's debut race was a 1,800-meter turf race at Kyoto Racecourse. Having drawn attention even before his debut by posting times in training that rivaled those of older horses, he was the favorite but finished second. He was entered in his second race, also on turf, but was scratched due to phlegmon. Transcend claimed his first victory in his third start, a dirt maiden race at Hanshin Racecourse. In a 5-million-yen class race run on a heavy track, he led from the front throughout the race and posted the fastest final three furlongs at 37.9 seconds to win by seven lengths. At this point, his team began considering an entry in the Tokyo Yushun, so Transcend returned to the turf to compete in the Kyoto Shimbun Hai. Although he had finished second in a maiden race on turf, all of his wins to that point had come on dirt, and he was the fifth favorite. In the race, Transcend took the lead as usual but couldn’t keep up in the home stretch, finishing ninth, well behind the winner, Best Member. In the 10-million-yen class Kirinzan Tokubetsu, he faced older horses for the first time but won by a margin of 8 lengths in record time.

In the newly established Leopard Stakes, Hiroyuki Uchida was suspended from riding in the UK, so Masami Matsuoka took over as the jockey. Although horses with proven dirt records, such as Suni and Silk Mobius, were entered, Transcend was backed as the favorite. In the race, he tracked in second place before breaking away in the home stretch to win by three lengths over Suni. Although the track was in good condition making it difficult to post fast times, his winning time matched that of his previous race. He was also the favorite in the Elm Stakes, held on the same course, but failed to finish strongly and finished fourth. In the subsequent Musashino Stakes, Transcend stayed back at the rear for the first time and gradually gained ground in the home stretch but still finished sixth. Trainer Yasuda commented, “He was concerned about the transition from turf to dirt.” After the race, he did not compete in the Japan Cup Dirt and went into a rest period.

=== 2010: four-year-old season ===
In Transcend's comeback race, the Aldebaran Stakes, Katsumi Ando rode him for the first time since the Kyoto Shimbun Hai. Backed as the second favorite behind Fusaichi Seven, he caught Fusaichi Seven in the home stretch to claim victory. Partly due to the fast pace of the race, the race was decided in a record time that beat the 1:56.6 set by Ryu Boy in 1983 by 1.2 seconds. Subsequently, he started as the favorite in the Antares Stakes. He raced in the leading pack but lacked a finishing kick in the home stretch and finished in 8th place. In the following Tokai Stakes, he again started as the favorite. He took the lead and set the pace for the field but was overtaken just before the finish line by Silk Mobius, who had closed in from the middle of the pack, and finished in 2nd place.

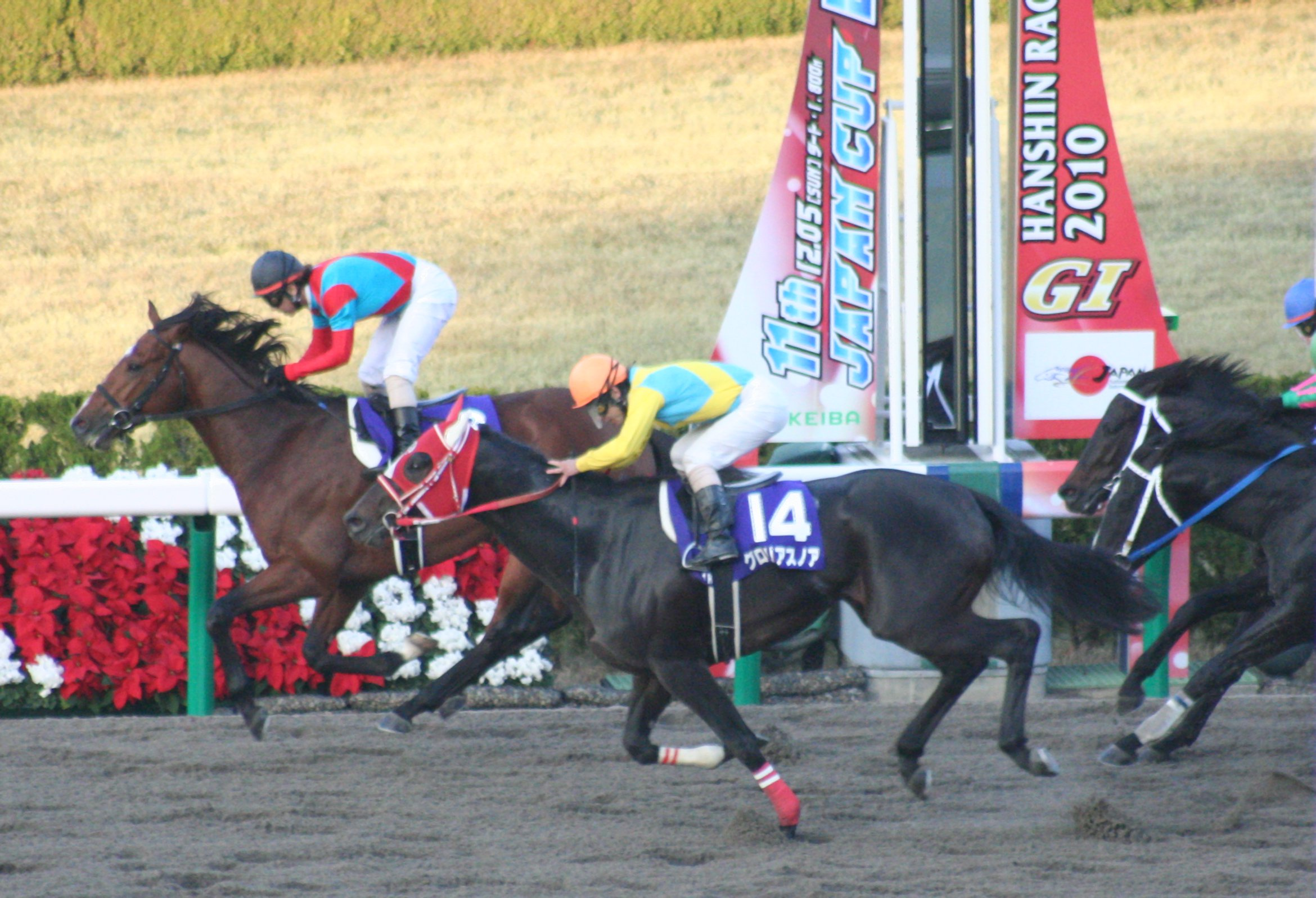
Transcend racing at the 2010 Japan Cup Dirt.

Transcend kicked off the fall season with the Nippon TV Hai. Although he was overtaken by Furioso in the home stretch, he held on to finish second. In the first Miyako Stakes, he took the lead from the start and without losing any momentum, went on to win, securing his second graded stakes victory. In the Japan Cup Dirt, with Espoir City and Smart Falcon having withdrawn, Transcend was backed as the favorite. He took the lead at the start and, though challenged by Birdie Birdie coming out of the fourth turn, pulled away and held off a late charge by Glorious Noah by a neck to claim his first GI victory.

=== 2011: five-year-old season ===
Transcend's first race of the year was the February Stakes. As in his previous race, with Espoir City and Smart Falcon absent, he was once again the favorite. He took the lead from the start and pulled away from the field in the home stretch, fending off a late charge from Furioso and others to hold on for his second GI victory. Following this victory, his entry in the Godolphin Mile was withdrawn, and he was entered in the Dubai World Cup alongside Buena Vista and Victoire Pisa. In the Dubai World Cup, Transcend took the lead from the start but was narrowly defeated in a neck-and-neck battle with fellow Japanese horse Victoire Pisa in the final straight, finishing in second place.

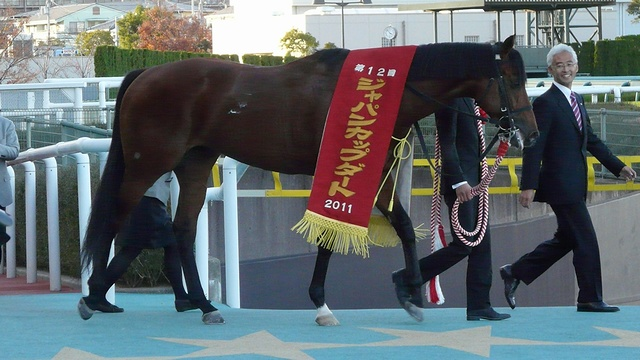
Transcend at the 2011 Japan Cup Dirt.

Transcend's fall schedule was originally set to begin with the Nippon TV Hai, but he was withdrawn from that race. In the Mile Championship Nambu Hai which was held at Tokyo Racecourse due to the Tōhoku earthquake, he extended his lead from second place during the race and prevailed in a head-to-head battle with Danon Come On in the home stretch to claim his third Grade 1 victory. His finishing time of 1 minute 34.8 seconds was a fast performance, just 0.2 seconds off the then-standing record for the 1,600-meter dirt course at Tokyo Racecourse. In the JBC Classic, he ran in second place and closed the gap on the front-running Smart Falcon in the home stretch, but narrowly lost, finishing second. In the Japan Cup Dirt, he seized the lead from the outermost gate and, showing no signs of tiring in the home stretch, held on to win, becoming the first horse in Japan Cup Dirt history to win back-to-back titles.

=== 2012: six-year-old season ===
Transcend started as the favorite in the February Stakes. Although he was unable to build up speed on the turf section immediately after the start, he improved his position on the backstretch and moved up to fourth place by the third turn, but he lost momentum in the home stretch and finished in seventh. He competed in the Dubai World Cup again, following his 2011 appearance. In the Dubai World Cup, Transcend took the lead from the start and led the race, but lost momentum at the third turn and finished 13th, bringing up the rear. In the JBC Classic, following a layoff of about seven months, he was the favorite but finished third, 1.6 seconds behind the winner, Wonder Acute. In the Japan Cup Dirt, Transcend attempted to take the lead but was unable to do so; he ran in third place for most of the race but lost momentum at the third turn and, unable to recover, finished in 16th place, bringing up the rear. He also finished seventh in the Tokyo Daishoten, ending the year without a single victory.

== Retirement ==
In light of the previous year, which ended without a single victory, his team decided to retire him from racing on January 3, 2013 and transition him to stud. After retiring from racing, he moved to Arrow Stud in Shinhidaka, Hokkaido, where he began his career as a stallion. On January 6, the Japan Racing Association announced that his registration as a racehorse would be canceled effective January 9. He retired from stud duties in 2025 and was transferred to Versailles Resort Farm.

== In popular culture ==
An anthropomorphized version of Transcend appears as a character in the Japanese multimedia franchise Umamusume: Pretty Derby, voiced by Yui Tsukada. She is depicted as an eccentric information-savvy girl with interests in modern subcultures, who is constantly driven by the desire for further knowledge to satiate her own curiosity. This also extends to her expertise with computers and modern technology, and as such her roommate and best friend Wonder Acute regularly seeks her help due to her inability to understand contemporary electronic devices.

== Racing form ==
The following racing form is based on information available on JBIS search, netkeiba.com, and Racing Post.

Date	Age	Racecourse	Race	Grade	Distance	Gate	Odds	Fav.	Fin.	Time	Margin	Jockey	Winner (Runner-Up)
2009/02/14	3	Kyoto	Three-Year-Old Newcomer	Maiden	T 1800m	11	3.9	1	2nd	1:51.1	0.1	Y.Kawada	Admire Again
2009/03/01	3	Hanshin	Three-Year-Old Maiden	Maiden	T 1600m	1			NR			K.Ando	Triumph March
2009/04/11	3	Hanshin	Three-Year-Old Maiden	Maiden	D 1800m	1	2.9	2	1st	1:53.7	-0.3	K.Ando	(Red Surpass)
2009/04/25	3	Kyoto	Three-Year-Old Pre-OP	Pre-OP	D 1800m	2	1.9	1	1st	1:49.7	-1.2	K.Ando	(Smart Pulse)
2009/05/09	3	Kyoto	Kyoto Shimbun Hai	G2	T 2200m	12	10.9	5	9th	2:14.4	1.4	K.Ando	Best Member
2009/07/26	3	Niigata	Kirinzan Tokubetsu	Pre-OP	D 1800m	11	2.0	1	1st	R1:49.5	-1.3	H.Uchida	(Christophoros)
2009/08/23	3	Niigata	Leopard Stakes	Listed	D 1800m	10	1.7	1	1st	1:49.5	-0.5	M.Matsuoka	(Suni)
2009/09/21	3	Niigata	Elm Stakes	G3	D 1800m	15	1.6	1	4th	1:51.4	0.3	H.Uchida	Machikanenihombare
2009/11/07	3	Tokyo	Musashino Stakes	G3	D 1600m	15	4.1	3	6th	1:35.9	0.4	M.Matsuoka	Wonder Acute
2010/02/13	4	Kyoto	Aldebaran Stakes	OP	D 1900m	8	3.5	2	1st	R1:55.4	-0.2	K.Ando	(Fusaichi Seven)
2010/04/25	4	Kyoto	Antares Stakes	G3	D 1800m	12	1.6	1	8th	1:50.5	0.8	K.Ando	Daishin Orange
2010/05/23	4	Kyoto	Tokai Stakes	G2	D 1900m	6	3.3	1	2nd	1:55.4	0.0	S.Fujita	Silk Mobius
2010/09/23	4	Funabashi	Nippon TV Hai	Jpn2	D 1800m	7	3.0	2	2nd	1:49.3	0.5	S.Fujita	Furioso
2010/11/07	4	Kyoto	Miyako Stakes	G3	D 1800m	2	3.1	2	1st	1:49.8	-0.2	S.Fujita	(King's Emblem)
2010/12/05	4	Hanshin	Japan Cup Dirt	G1	D 1800m	3	3.5	1	1st	1:48.9	0.0	S.Fujita	(Glorious Noah)
2011/02/20	5	Tokyo	February Stakes	G1	D 1600m	12	3.5	1	1st	1:36.4	-0.2	S.Fujita	(Furioso)
2011/03/26	5	Meydan	Dubai World Cup	G1	AW 2000m	9	40/1	13	2nd	2:06.0	0.1	S.Fujita	Victoire Pisa
2011/10/10	5	Tokyo	Mile Championship Nambu Hai	Jpn1	D 1600m	11	1.6	1	1st	1:34.8	0.0	S.Fujita	(Danon Come On)
2011/11/03	5	Oi	JBC Classic	Jpn1	D 2000m	9	2.4	2	2nd	2:02.3	0.2	S.Fujita	Smart Falcon
2011/12/04	5	Hanshin	Japan Cup Dirt	G1	D 1800m	16	2.0	1	1st	1:50.6	-0.3	S.Fujita	(Wonder Acute)
2012/02/19	6	Tokyo	February Stakes	G1	D 1600m	15	1.5	1	7th	1:36.6	1.2	S.Fujita	Testa Matta
2012/03/31	6	Meydan	Dubai World Cup	G1	AW 2000m	10	20/1	9	13th	2:07.5	4.8	S.Fujita	Monterosso
2012/11/05	6	Kawasaki	JBC Classic	Jpn1	D 2100m	13	2.6	1	3rd	2:14.1	1.6	S.Fujita	Wonder Acute
2012/12/02	6	Hanshin	Japan Cup Dirt	G1	D 1800m	7	9.0	5	16th	1:51.8	3.0	S.Fujita	Nihonpiro Ours
2012/12/29	6	Oi	Tokyo Daishoten	G1	D 2000m	9	21.7	6	7th	2:08.2	2.3	S.Fujita	Roman Legend

Legend
D = Dirt
T = Turf
AW = All-Weather

- R indicated that it was a record time finish

== Pedigree ==
Pedigree of Transcend (JPN)
Sire Wild Rush	Wild Again	Icecapade	Nearctic
Sire Wild Rush	Wild Again	Icecapade	Shenanigans
Sire Wild Rush	Wild Again	Bushel-n-Peck	Khaled
Sire Wild Rush	Wild Again	Bushel-n-Peck	Dama
Sire Wild Rush	Rose Park	Plugged Nickle	Key to the Mint
Sire Wild Rush	Rose Park	Plugged Nickle	Toll Booth
Sire Wild Rush	Rose Park	Hardship	Drone
Sire Wild Rush	Rose Park	Hardship	Hard and Fast
Dam Cinema Scope	Tony Bin	Kampala	Kalamoun
Dam Cinema Scope	Tony Bin	Kampala	State Pension
Dam Cinema Scope	Tony Bin	Severn Bridge	Hornbeam
Dam Cinema Scope	Tony Bin	Severn Bridge	Priddy Fair
Dam Cinema Scope	Blue Hawaii	Thrill Show	Northern Baby
Dam Cinema Scope	Blue Hawaii	Thrill Show	Splendid Girl
Dam Cinema Scope	Blue Hawaii	Sunny Swaps	Hawaii
Dam Cinema Scope	Blue Hawaii	Sunny Swaps	Iron Age
