= Cafe Pharoah =

Japanese Thoroughbred racehorse

Cafe Pharoah カフェファラオ
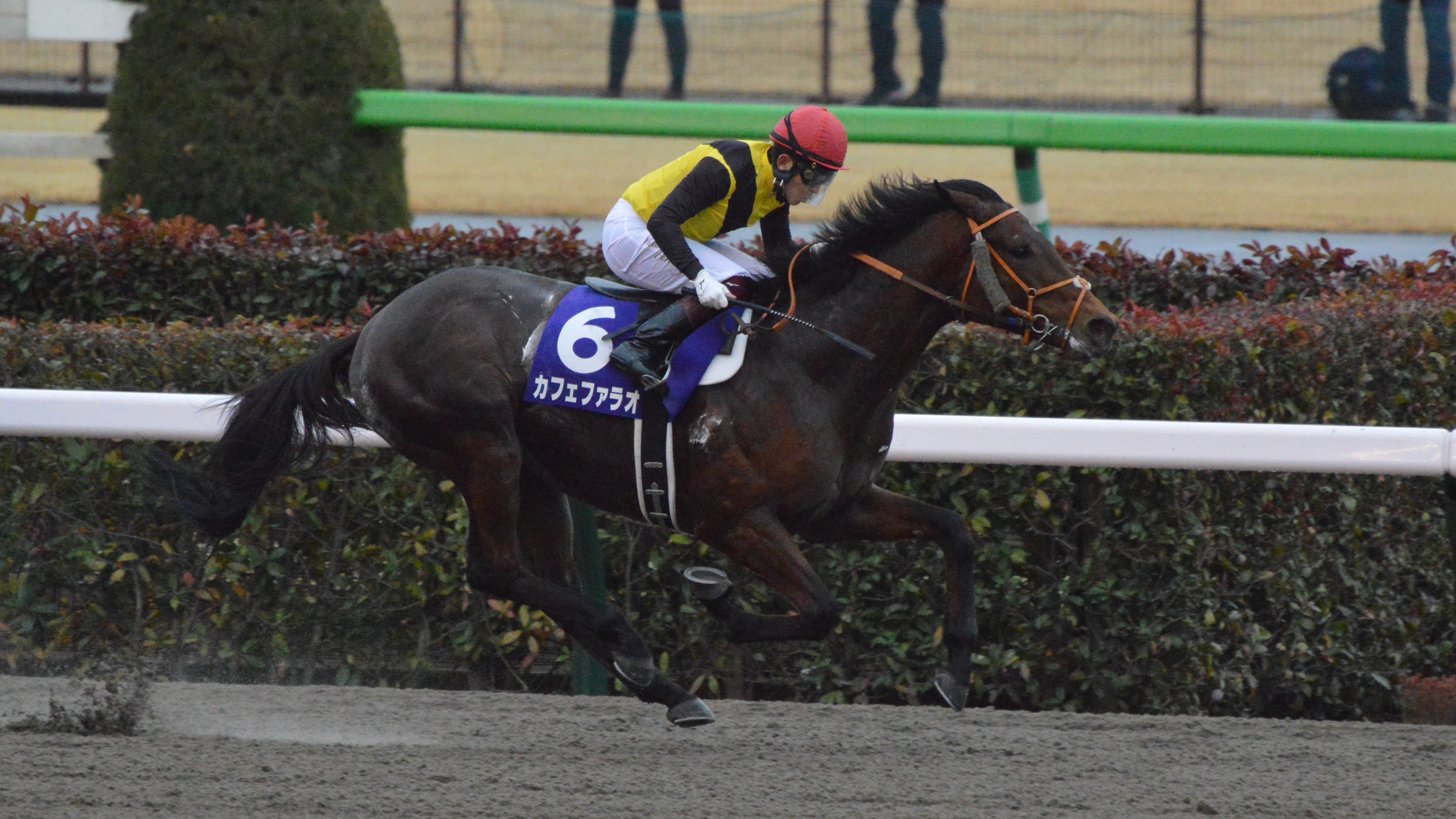
- Cafe Pharoah winning the 2022 February Stakes
- Sire: American Pharoah
- Grandsire: Pioneerof The Nile
- Dam: Mary's Follies
- Damsire: More Than Ready
- Sex: Stallion
- Foaled: 3 March 2017
- Country: United States
- Colour: Bay
- Breeder: Paul P. Pompa
- Owner: Koichi Nishikawa, Carcone Racing Stable, Carcone Holdings
- Racing colours
- Trainer: Noriyuki Hori
- Jockey: Christophe Lemaire; Yuichi Fukunaga
- Record: 17: 7-0-1
- Earnings: 657,424,900 JPY; Japan : 393,695,000 JPY （JRA）325,295,000 JPY （NAR）68,400,000 JPY; Saudi : 2,000,000 USD

Major wins
- Hyacinth Stakes (2020); Unicorn Stakes (2020); Sirius Stakes (2020); February Stakes (2021, 2022); Mile Championship Nambu Hai (2022)

Awards
- JRA Award for Best Dirt Horse (2022)

Cafe Pharoah (Japanese: カフェファラオ, Hepburn: Kafe Farao; foaled 3 March 2017) is an American-bred, Japanese-trained Thoroughbred racehorse. As a two-year-old in 2019, he established himself as a top-class dirt performer in the following year, winning the Hyacinth Stakes, Unicorn Stakes and Sirius Stakes. He also won the February Stakes two years in a row.

== Background ==
Cafe Pharoah is a bay colt with a small white star bred in Kentucky by Paul P Pompa. In March 2019, after failing to find a buyer at Keeneland as a yearling, he was consigned to the Ocala Breeders' Sales Company Sale of Two-Year-Olds in Training and was bought for $475,000 by the bloodstock agency Narvick International. The colt was exported to Japan and entered training with Noriyuki Hori. He carries the yellow and black racing colours of Koichi Nishikawa. As of February 2021 Cafe Pharoah has raced exclusively on dirt tracks.

He was from the first crop of foals sired by American Pharoah, who won the American Triple Crown and the Breeders' Cup Classic in 2015. Like his sire, Cafe Pharoah's name uses an unconventional spelling of Pharaoh. Cafe Pharoah's dam Mary's Follies showed good racing form on turf in the United States, winning four races including the Grade II Mrs. Revere Stakes and the Grade III Boiling Springs Stakes. She was descended from the American broodmare Charwoman (foaled in 1926), making her a distant relative of Bounding Home and Riva Ridge.

== Racing career ==
=== 2019: two-year-old season ===
Cafe Pharoah made his first and only appearance of 2019 in a contest for previously unraced two-year-olds over 1800 metres at Nakayama Racecourse on 14 December when he was ridden by the British jockey Ryan Moore. Starting favourite against thirteen opponents he led from the start and won by ten lengths from Barnard Loop, who was in turn nine lengths clear of the rest.

=== 2020: three-year-old season ===
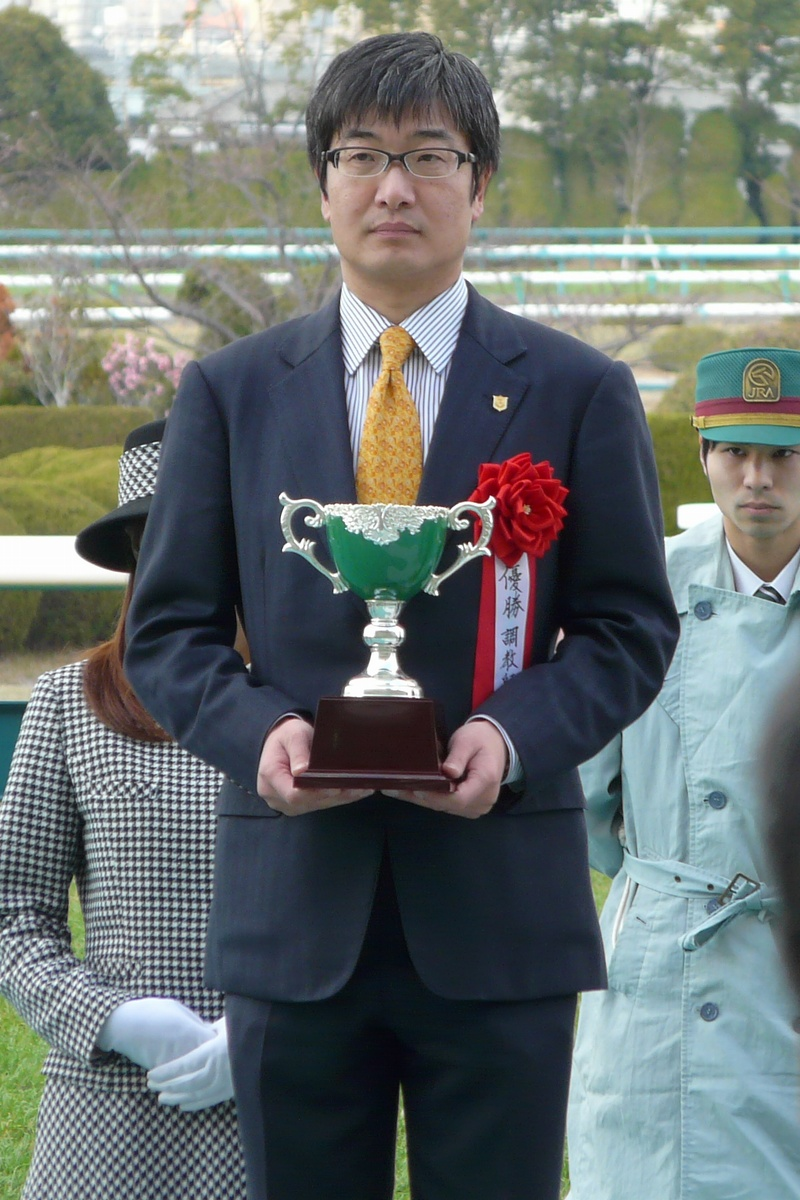
Cafe Pharoah's trainer Noriyuki Hori

For his first run as a three-year-old Cafe Pharoah was stepped up in class for the Listed Hyacinth Stakes over 1600 metres at Tokyo Racecourse on 23 February and started the 1.1/1 favourite ahead of Tagano Beauty, a colt who had finished fourth in the Grade 1 Asahi Hai Futurity Stakes. Ridden by Mirco Demuro he raced towards the rear and was only eighth entering the straight but then finished strongly, took the lead in the closing stages, and won by a length from Tagano Beauty. After a break of almost four months the colt was partnered by Damian Lane when he started favourite for the Grade 3 Unicorn Stakes over the same course and distance. After tracking the front-running Lecce Baroque he took the lead in the straight and drew away to win by five lengths. On 9 July at the National Association of Racing's Ohi Racecourse Cafe Pharoah started favourite for the Japan Dirt Derby but sustained his first defeat as he ran disappointingly on the sloppy track and finished seventh behind Danon Pharaoh.

Following a late summer break, Cafe Pharoah returned to the track in October at Chukyo Racecourse to contest the Sirius Stakes, a race which saw him matched against older horses for the first time. Ridden for the first time by Christophe Lemaire he started the 0.7/1 favourite with the best-fancied of his fifteen opponents in the 1900 metre contest being the five-year-old Ardore. He raced in mid-division before making progress on the outside on the final turn and produced a sustained run to overtake Sakura Allure in the final strides and win by three quarters of a length. On his final run of the year the colt started second favourite behind the 2019 JRA Award for Best Dirt Horse winner Chrysoberyl in the Grade 1 Champions Cup over 1800 metres at Chukyo on 6 December. He raced on the outside in tenth place before making steady progress in the straight but never looked like winning and came home sixth behind the five-year-old Chuwa Wizard.

In the official Japanese rankings Cafe Pharoah was rated the best three-year-old colt of 2020 on dirt, level with half-brother Danon Pharaoh (whose dam is Crisp, finished seventh in the 2010 Kentucky Oaks).

=== 2021: Four-Year-Old Season ===
Cafe Pharoah began his third campaign in the Grade One February Stakes over 1600 metres at Tokyo Racecourse on February 21. In the build-up to the race, Noriyuki Hori explained that Lemaire had been unable to ride the horse in training owing to COVID-19 restrictions, and also said that the colt would be equipped with blinkers for the first time. Cafe Pharoah started the 2.3/1 favourite in a sixteen horse field which also included Inti (winner of the race in 2019), Arctos (Procyon Stakes winner), Red Le Zele (Negishi Stakes winner), Sunrise Nova (Procyon Stakes winner), Auvergne (Tokai Stakes winner), Wonder Lider (Musashino Stakes winner), Air Spinel (Daily Hai Nisai Stakes winner), Air Almas (Tokai Stakes winner), and Wide Pharaoh (New Zealand Trophy winner). After racing in third behind Wide Pharaoh and Air Almas, Cafe Pharoah went to the front in the straight and held off the late challenge of Air Spinel to win by three quarters of a length. His victory gave his sire American Pharoah his first Japan Grade 1 winner and first Grade 1 winner on dirt. After the race Lemaire said "His condition was super, and I had confidence already at the paddock. We decided to use cheek pieces hoping for a more aggressive performance. His start was good, we were positioned well and he responded beautifully. The colt has such high potential... I'm happy that it all worked out today".

Following the victory, Cafe Pharoah was sent to the Kashiwa Kinen. He was the most favored to win at that race, but ended up finishing in fifth place behind Casino Fountain. Cafe Pharoah was later sent to the Hakodate Kinen, which made it the first time the horse ran on a turf course, but finished at 9th place. The horse would go on and race in the Champions Cup once again, but finished at 11th place.

=== 2022: Five-year-old Season ===
Cafe Pharoah once again started the season with the February Stakes. However, as Lemaire was slated to run with Teorema that race, Yuichi Fukunaga temporarily became Cafe Pharoah's jockey. In spite of this, Cafe Pharoah still managed to win the race.

The horse was sent to a turf race once more, this time the Grade I Yasuda Kinen, but finished at 17th place.

After a summer break, the horse returned to the dirt races by enterering the Mile Championship Nambu Hai. where he finished by a nose against Helios.

=== 2023: Six-year-old Season ===
Rather than starting the season off with the February Stakes once more, it was announce that he would be sent to Saudi Arabia for that year's Saudi Cup. He finihshed 3rd behind Panthalassa. Following this, he was sent to Dubai for the Dubai World Cup, but finished at 12th place behind Ushba Tesoro.

Cafe Pharoah struggled to even get in 5th place on for the rest of the year, and on November 24, it was announced by the JRA that Cafe Pharoah would be retiring from racing to stand stud at the Arrow Stud in Shinhidaka, Hokkaido.

== Racing form ==
Cafe Pharoah won seven races out of 17 starts. This data is available on JBIS, netkeiba and racingpost.

Date	Track	Race	Grade	Distance (Condition)	Entry	HN	Odds (Favored)	Finish	Time	Margins	Jockey	Winner (Runner-up)
2019 – two-year-old season
Dec 14	Nakayama	2yo debut		1800m（Fast）	14	1	2.0（1）	1st	1:54.7	−1.6	Ryan Moore	(Barnard Loop)
2020 – three-year-old season
Feb 23	Tokyo	Hyacinth Stakes	L	1600m（Fast）	14	3	2.1（1）	1st	1:37.7	−0.2	Mirco Demuro	(Tagano Beauty)
Jun 21	Nakayama	Unicorn Stakes	3	1600m（Good）	16	16	2.0（1）	1st	1:34.9	−0.8	Damian Lane	(Dieu du Vin)
Jul 8	Oi	Japan Dirt Derby	JPN1 (Note: Every JPN graded races was labeled as Listed (L) internationally)	2000m（Sloppy）	13	2	1.1（1）	7th	2:08.4	2.5	Damian Lane	Danon Pharaoh
Oct 3	Chukyo	Sirius Stakes	3	1900m（Fast）	16	15	1.7（1）	1st	1:57.8	–0.1	Christophe Lemaire	(Sakura Allure)
Dec 6	Chukyo	Champions Cup	1	1800m（Fast）	16	7	6.0（2）	6th	1:50.2	0.9	Christophe Lemaire	Chuwa Wizard
2021 – four-year-old season
Feb 21	Tokyo	February Stakes	1	1600m（Fast）	16	3	3.3（1）	1st	1:34.4	−0.1	Christophe Lemaire	(Air Spinel)
May 5	Funabashi	Kashiwa Kinen	JPN1	1600m（Good）	12	3	2.1（1）	5th	1:40.4	1.1	Christophe Lemaire	Casino Fountain
Jul 18	Hakodate	Hakodate Kinen	3	2000m（Firm）	16	1	4.1（1）	9th	1:59.4	0.7	Christophe Lemaire	Tosen Surya
Dec 5	Chukyo	Champions Cup	1	1800m（Fast）	16	16	9.6（4）	11th	1:51.7	2.0	Christophe Lemaire	T O Keynes
2022 – five-year-old season
Feb 20	Tokyo	February Stakes	1	1600m（Sloppy）	16	6	5.1（2）	1st	1:33.8	−0.4	Yuichi Fukunaga	(T M South Dan)
Jun 5	Tokyo	Yasuda Kinen	1	1600m（Firm）	18	1	21.6（10）	17th	1:33.3	1.0	Yuichi Fukunaga	Songline
Oct 10	Morioka	Mile Championship Nambu Hai	JPN1	1600m（Muddy）	16	4	2.8（1）	1st	1:34.6	0.0	Yuichi Fukunaga	(Helios)
2023 – six-year-old season
Feb 25	King Abdulaziz	Saudi Cup	1	1800m（Fast）	13	1	16/1（6）	3rd	1:51.1	0.3	Joao Moreira	Panthalassa
Mar 25	Meydan	Dubai World Cup	1	2000m（Fast）	15	3	29.0（9）	12th	2:15.1	11.8	Joao Moreira	Ushba Tesoro
Jun 4	Tokyo	Yasuda Kinen	1	1600m（Firm）	18	16	226.1（18）	12th	1:32.3	0.9	Suguru Hamanaka	Songline
Oct 9	Morioka	Mile Championship Nambu Hai	JPN1	1600m（Good）	14	2	3.8（2）	5th	1:36.0	2.2	Ryo Takamatsu	Lemon Pop

Legend:
Dirt Turf

== Pedigree ==
Pedigree of Cafe Pharoah (USA), bay colt 2017
Sire American Pharoah (USA) 2012	Pioneerof The Nile (USA); 2006	Empire Maker	Unbridled
Sire American Pharoah (USA) 2012	Pioneerof The Nile (USA); 2006	Empire Maker	Toussaud
Sire American Pharoah (USA) 2012	Pioneerof The Nile (USA); 2006	Star of Goshen	Lord At War (ARG)
Sire American Pharoah (USA) 2012	Pioneerof The Nile (USA); 2006	Star of Goshen	Castle Eight
Sire American Pharoah (USA) 2012	Littleprincessemma (USA); 2006	Yankee Gentleman	Storm Cat
Sire American Pharoah (USA) 2012	Littleprincessemma (USA); 2006	Yankee Gentleman	Key Phrase
Sire American Pharoah (USA) 2012	Littleprincessemma (USA); 2006	Exclusive Rosette	Ecliptical
Sire American Pharoah (USA) 2012	Littleprincessemma (USA); 2006	Exclusive Rosette	Zetta Jet
Dam Mary's Follies (USA) 2006	More Than Ready (USA); 1997	Southern Halo	Halo
Dam Mary's Follies (USA) 2006	More Than Ready (USA); 1997	Southern Halo	Northern Sea
Dam Mary's Follies (USA) 2006	More Than Ready (USA); 1997	Woodman's Girl	Woodman
Dam Mary's Follies (USA) 2006	More Than Ready (USA); 1997	Woodman's Girl	Becky Be Good
Dam Mary's Follies (USA) 2006	Catch The Queen (USA); 1999	Miswaki	Mr Prospector
Dam Mary's Follies (USA) 2006	Catch The Queen (USA); 1999	Miswaki	Hopespringseternal
Dam Mary's Follies (USA) 2006	Catch The Queen (USA); 1999	Wave To The Queen	Wavering Monarch
Dam Mary's Follies (USA) 2006	Catch The Queen (USA); 1999	Wave To The Queen	Blue Ankle (Family: 1-k)
