= Sirius Stakes =

Sirius Stakes シリウスステークス
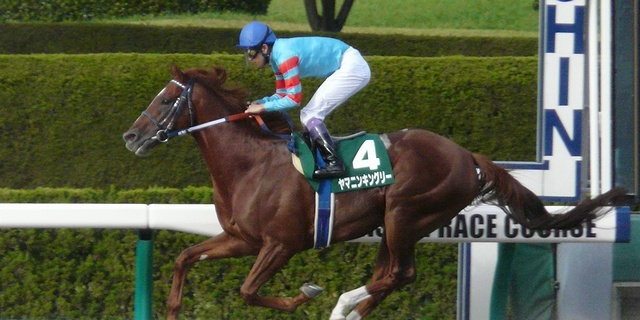
- Yamanin Kingly wins the 2011 Sirius Stakes
- Class: Grade 3
- Location: Hanshin Racecourse
- Inaugurated: 1997
- Race type: Thoroughbred Flat racing

Race information
- Distance: 2,000 meters
- Surface: Dirt
- Track: Right-handed
- Qualification: 3-y-o+
- Weight: Handicap
- Purse: ¥ 82,380,000 (as of 2025): 1st: ¥ 38,000,000; 2nd: ¥ 15,000,000; 3rd: ¥ 10,000,000

The Sirius Stakes (Japanese シリウスステークス) is a Japanese Grade 3 horse race for Thoroughbreds aged three and over. It is run in late September or early October over a distance of 2,000 meters on dirt at Hanshin Racecourse in Takarazuka, Hyogo, Japan.

It was first run in 1990 and has held Grade 3 status since 1997. The first six editions of the race took place at Chukyo Racecourse and it was also run at that track in 2006. Originally contested as a 1,200 meter sprint on turf until the race distance was increased to 1,400 meters on dirt in 1997 and 1,700 meters in 2006. The Sirius Stakes has been run over 2,000 meters since 2007.

== Past winners ==
Year	Winner	Age	Jockey	Trainer	Owner	Time
1990	Horino Winner	3	Kunio Uchida	Kunihiko Take	Masao Horiuchi	1:09.9
1991	Minamoto Junius	4	Koichi Tsunoda	Sakujuro Takeda	Kiyoshi Sato	1:09.1
1992	Samson Queen	5	Junichi Serizawa	Koji Shikato	Yoshiko Tanaka	1:08.7
1993	Yuki Top Run	5	Sadahiro Kojima	Suguru Sayama	Hideki Yukimoto	1:08.6
1994	Eishin Washington	3	Shigefumi Kumazawa	Shigeharu Naito	Toyomitsu Hirai	1:07.9
1995	Nihon Pillow Study	3	Tetsuya Kobayashi	Tetsuya Meno	Hyakutaro Kobayashi	1:08.0
1996	Nishino Final	3	Takahito Kikuzawa	Masahiro Matsuda	Nishiyama Farm	1:10.2
1997	Toyo Rainbow	3	Masahiro Matsunaga	Yoshiharu Matsunaga	Toyo Club	1:24.0
1998	Makoto Raiden	4	Yuichi Fukunaga	Toshimasa Hashimoto	Akira Makabe	1:23.6
1999	Gold Tiara	3	Yutaka Take	Kunihiko Matsuda	Kazuko Yoshida	1:23.1
2000	Meiner Brian	3	Shinji Fujita	Toru Miya	Thoroughbred Club Ruffian	1:23.3
2001	Broad Appeal	7	Hirofumi Shii	Kunihide Matsuda	Makoto Kaneko	1:23.7
2002	Sterling Rose	5	Ryuji Wada	Shuji Kitahashi	Kyoei	1:22.4
2003	Meiner Select	4	Naohiro Onishi	Hitoshi Nakamura	Thoroughbred Club Ruffian	1:23.1
2004	Agnes Wing	4	Hideaki Miyuki	Toshiaki Shirai	Takao Watanabe	1:23.1
2005	Blue Concorde	5	Hideaki Miyuki	Toshiyuki Hattori	Ogifushi Racing Club	1:23.9
2006	Meisho Battler	6	Tetsuzo Sato	Shigetada Takahashi	Yoshio Matsumoto	1:43.1
2007	Dragon Fire	3	Yuichi Fukunaga	Takashi Kubota	Yoshiro Kubota	2:05.1
2008	Meiner Hourglass	4	Minoru Yoshida	Ryuichi Inaba	Thoroughbred Club Ruffian	2:03.8
2009	Wonder Acute	3	Ryuji Wada	Masao Sato	Nobuyuki Yamamoto	2:04.5
2010	Kings Emblem	5	Yuichi Fukunaga	Sei Ishizaka	Sunday Racing	2:04.4
2011	Yamanin Kingly	6	Yutaka Take	Hiroshi Kawachi	Hajime Doi	2:04.3
2012	Nice Meet You	5	Futoshi Komaki	Kojiro Hashiguchi	Danox	2:03.3
2013	Keiai Leone	3	Hideaki Miyuki	Katsuichi Nihiura	Kazuhiro Kameda	2:03.4
2014	Kurino Star O	4	Hideaki Miyuki	Yohitada Takahashi	Mamoru Kurimoto	2:03.8
2015	Awardee	5	Yutaka Take	Mikio Matsunaga	Koji Maeda	2:04.6
2016	Mask Zorro	5	Shinichiro Akiyama	Inao Okada	Shigeo Kadono	2:01.7
2017	Meisho Sumitomo	6	Yoshihiro Furukawa	Katsumi Minai	Yoshio Matsumoto	2:03.9
2018	Omega Perfume	3	Ryuji Wada	Shogo Yasuda	Reiko Hara	2:01.5
2019	Lord Golazo	4	Yusuke Fujioka	Kenichi Fujioka	Lord Horse Club	2:03.5
2020 (Note: The race took place at Chukyo Racecourse over 1900 metres.)	Cafe Pharoah	3	Christophe Lemaire	Noriyuki Hori	Koichi Nishikawa	1:57.8
2021	Sunrise Hope	4	Hideaki Miyuki	Tomohiko Hatsuki	Takao Matsuoka	1:57.4
2022	Jun Light Bolt	5	Yukito Ishikawa	Yasuo Tomomichi	Junji Kawai	1:57.7
2023	Hagino Alegrias	6	Mirai Iwata	Hirofumi Shii	Kokichi Hinokuma	2:04.4
2024	Hagino Alegrias	7	Mirai Iwata	Hirofumi Shii	Kokichi Hinokuma	1:57.1
2025	Ho O Roulette	6	Yasunari Iwata	Toru Kurita	Yoshihisa Ozasa	2:04.8
2026	Walzer Schall	7	Arata Saito	Noboru Takagi	West Forest Stable Co. Ltd.	2:05.3

== See also ==
- Horse racing in Japan
- List of Japanese flat horse races
