= Hokko Tarumae =

Japanese racehorse (foaled 2009)

Hokko Tarumae ホッコータルマエ
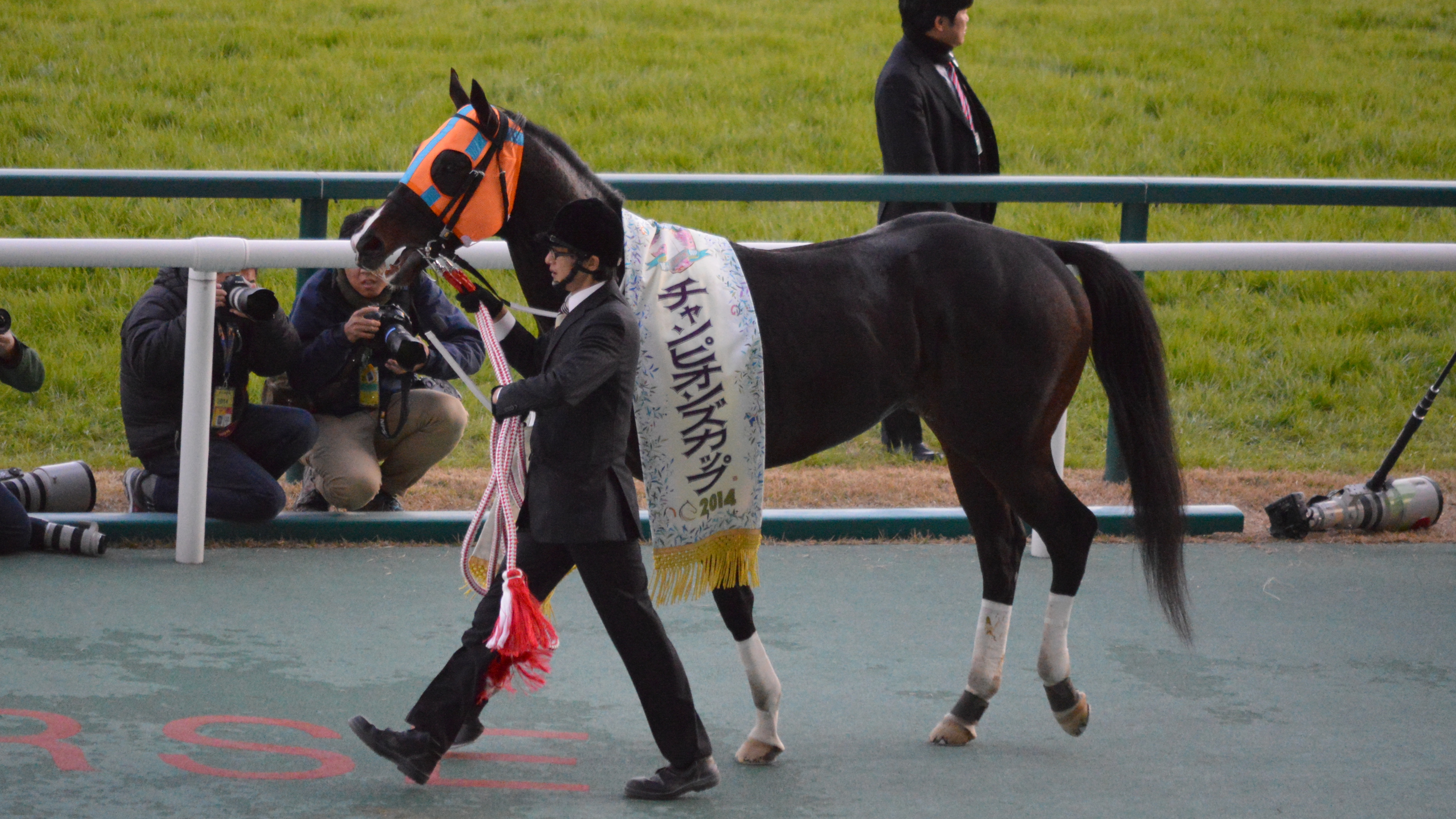
- Hokko Tarumae after winning the 2014 Champions Cup.
- Breed: Thoroughbred
- Sire: King Kamehameha (JPN)
- Grandsire: Kingmambo (USA)
- Dam: Madam Cherokee (JPN)
- Damsire: Cherokee Run (USA)
- Sex: Stallion
- Foaled: May 26, 2009 (age 17); Urakawa, Hokkaido
- Country: Japan
- Color: Bay
- Breeder: Ichikawa Farm
- Owner: Koichi Yabe →Michiaki Yabe →Hokko Shoji
- Racing colours
- Trainer: Katsuichi Nishiura
- Jockey: Hideaki Miyuki
- Record: 39: 17-5-7-10; JRA: 17: 6-2-5-4; NAR: 19: 11-3-2-3; UAE: 3: 0-0-0-3
- Earnings: ¥1,114,591,800; JRA: ¥351,056,000; NAR: ¥727,650,000; UAE: US$300,000

Major wins
- Tokyo Daishoten (2013, 2014); Champions Cup (2014); Kashiwa Kinen (2013); Teio Sho (2013, 2015); Japan Breeding Farms' Cup Classic (2013); Kawasaki Kinen (2014–16); Leopard Stakes (2012); Antares Stakes (2013); Saga Kinen (2013); Nagoya Daishoten (2013)

Awards
- JRA Award for Best Dirt Horse (2014); NAR Grand Prix Dirt Grade Race Special Prize (2013–15)

Hokko Tarumae (Japanese: ホッコータルマエ, Hepburn: Hokkō Tarumae; foaled May 26, 2009) is a Japanese Thoroughbred racehorse and sire. He won the NAR Grand Prix Dirt Grade Race Special Prize for the 2013-2015 season, and won the JRA Award for Best Dirt Horse in 2014. After receiving this award, the Tomakomai Tourism Association made him into the tourism ambassador of Tomakomai.

== Background ==
Hokko Tarumae was put up for auction at the Hokkaido Selection Sale for yearlings in 2010 and was sold to Koichi Yabe for 15,750,000 Japanese yen.

The horse is named after Mount Tarumae, a volcano located within the city of Tomakomai, where the owner (who uses the eponym Hokko) is from.

== Racing career ==
=== 2012: three-year-old season ===
Hokko Tarumae debuted on January 14 at Kyoto Racecourse with Kodai Hasegawa as his jockey but finished at 11th. He won his first race at the next race, a maiden race held at Kokura Racecourse, with Issei Murata as his jockey. He won his second race after two unremarkable starts at an allowance race at Hanshin Racecourse, which was the first race the horse was ridden by Hideaki Miyuki; who would become his main jockey. He then won his third race victory at the Oume Tokubetsu on June 3 at Tokyo Racecourse.

Hokko Tarumae was then entered on to the Japan Dirt Derby on July 11 but finished 5th behind Hatano Vainqueur. Miyuki stated that the horse lost not because he was a weaker horse but was because the horse was distracted and had to place him in a position further behind than what he had hoped for. On August 5, Hokko Tarumae was entered in to his second graded race, the Leopard Stakes, which he won; marking his first graded race victory. While Hokko Tarumae did not win a single race for the rest of the season, he still managed to finish 3rd in the Japan Cup Dirt despite being the 9th favored to win.

=== 2013: four-year-old season ===
Hokko Tarumae started the season with the Tokai Stakes. For the first time in his career, he was the most favored to win a race but ultimately finished third behind Grape Brandy. He won the next three races, the Saga Kinen, the Nagoya Daishoten, and the Antares Stakes, consecutively. He would then go on to win his first JpnI race, the Kashiwa Kinen, beating Espoir City. He would also win the next race, the JpnI Teio Sho, beating Nihonpiro Ours.

After a three-and-a-half months long break, Hokko Tarumae was entered into the Mile Championship Nambu Hai, but his winning streak was broken in that race as he failed to catch up to the front-runner Espoir City. Hokko Tarumae became the front runner in his next race, the Japan Breeding Farms' Cup Classic, where he held on to the lead and finished the race in record time for the course. On his next race, the Japan Cup Dirt, Hokko Tarumae managed to take the lead from the front running Espoir City, but finished third after he was passed by both Belshazzar and Wonder Acute after the final 100 meter mark. On his next and final race of the season, the Tokyo Daishōten, Hokko Tarumae won the race by beating Wonder Acute by a length and a half; marking his fourth JpnI/GI race wins of his career.

For the horse's accomplishment of this season, the National Association of Racing awarded the NAR Grand Prix Dirt Grade Race Special Prize for that year.

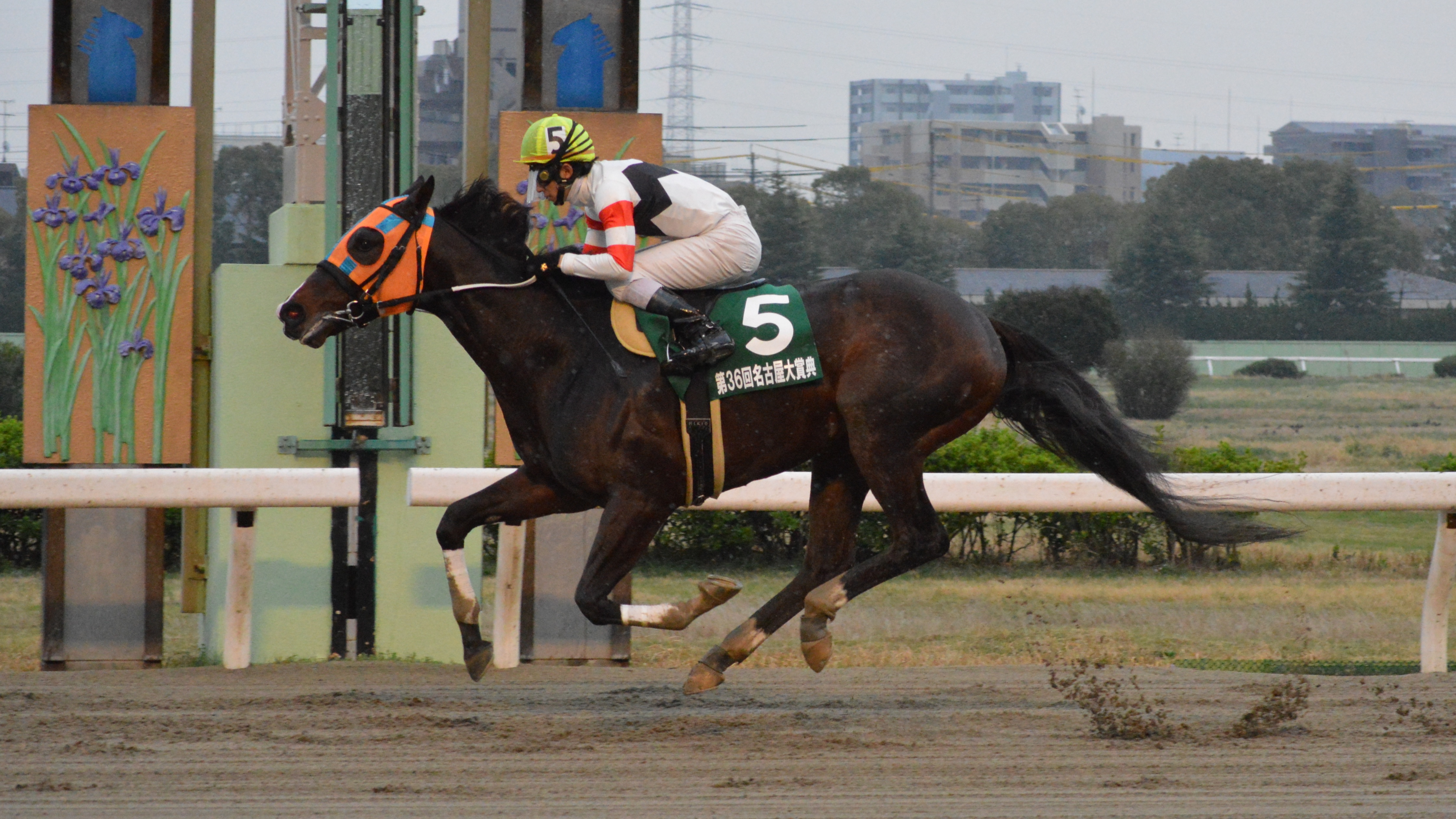
Nagoya Daishoten

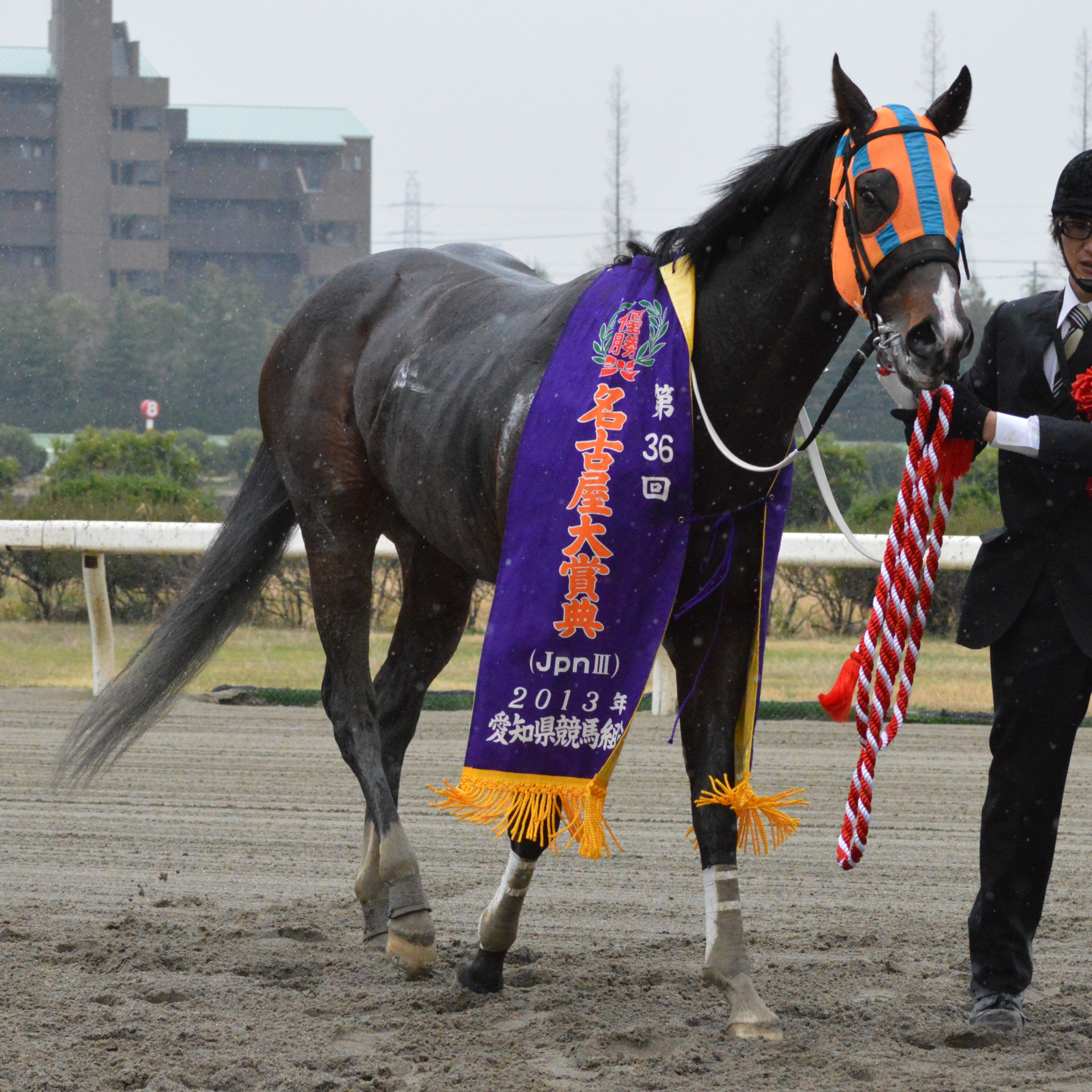
Nagoya Daishoten awards ceremony

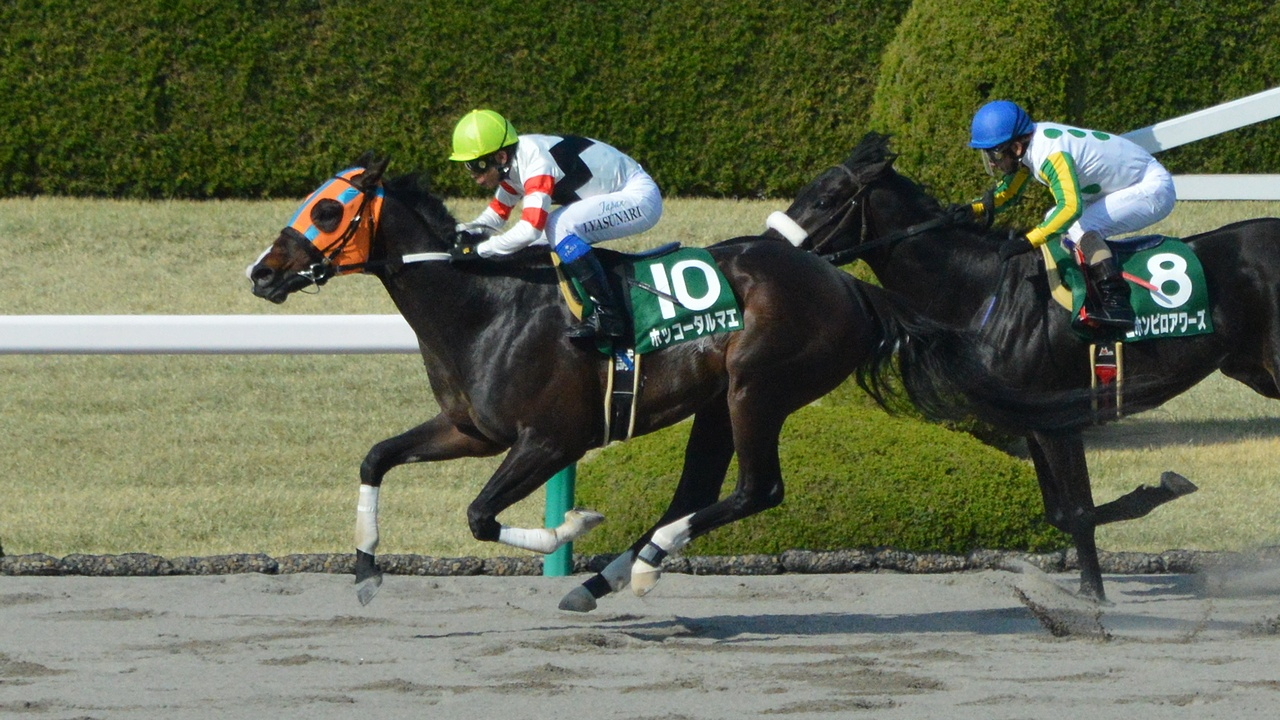
Antares Stakes

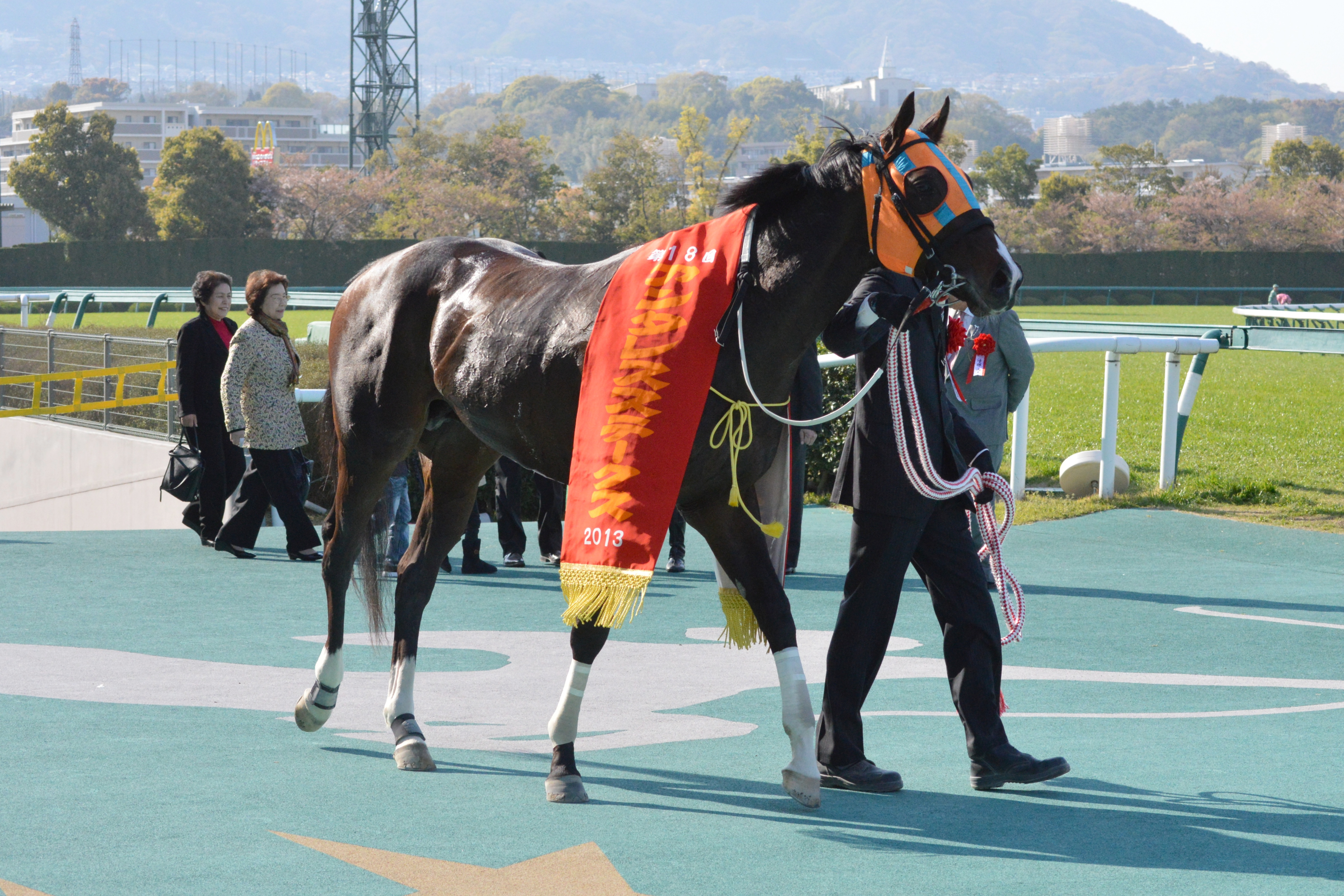
Antares Stakes awards ceremony

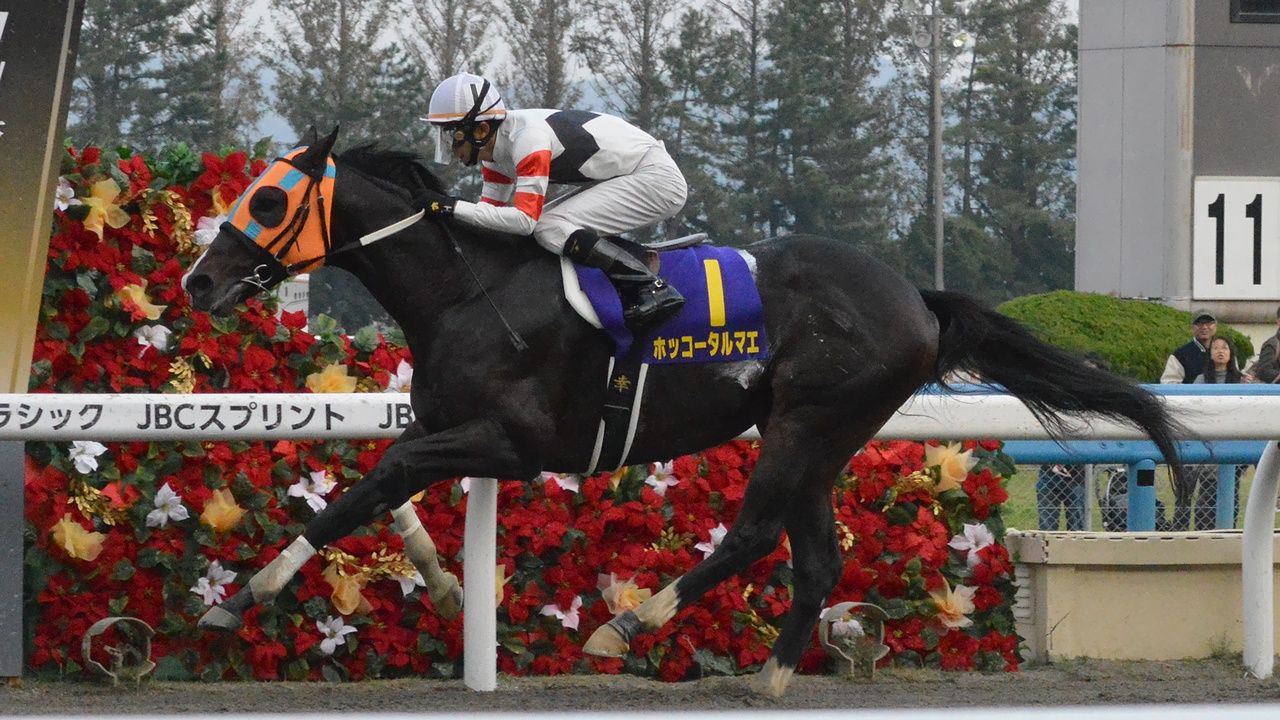
JBC Classic

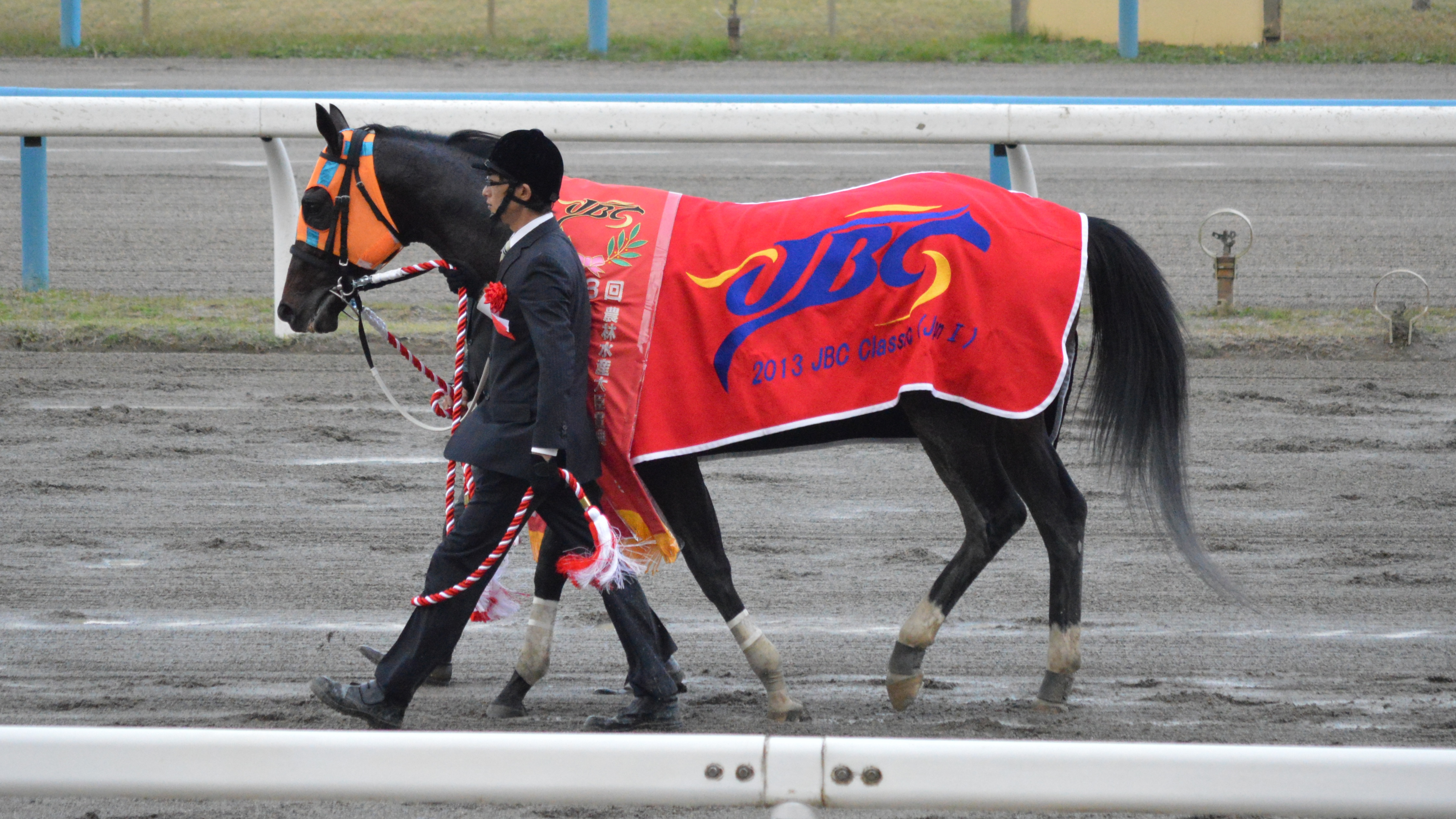
JBC Classic awards ceremony

=== 2014: five-year-old season ===
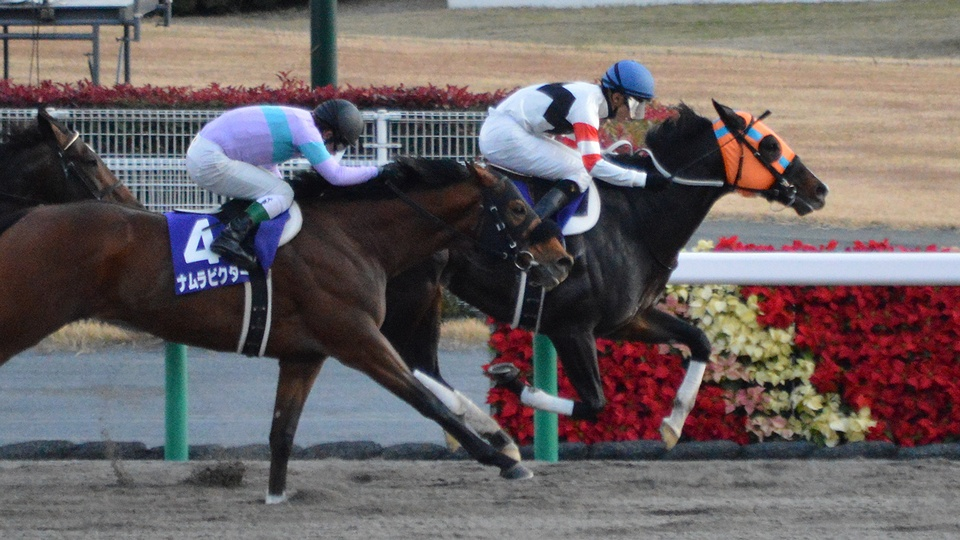
Champions' Cup

Hokko Tarumae's first race of the season was the Kawasaki Kinen, where he was the most favored to win by far, and won his 5th GI/JpnI race. He finished second on his next race, the February Stakes, as he was unable to catch up to Copano Rickey, who was the underdog of the race that scored an upset victory after he took the lead relatively early on.

Hokko Tarumae was then entered into his first race abroad, which was the Dubai World Cup, but finished last. Following the race, the horse fell ill and was diagnosed as stress induced enterocolitis by the veterinarians, which led to his return to Japan being delayed a week. Following his return, it was announced that the horse would rest until Autumn.

After recuperating, he ran the Japan Breeding Farms' Cup Classic, where he finished fourth. Later, he was entered into the Champions' Cup, where he ran second for most of the race before taking over front runner Kurino Star O and winning the race, scoring his first ever JRA GI win and a total of his 6th GI/JpnI win, although his jockey Miyuki was fined 50,000 yen for poor use of his whip on the final stretch. He was then entered into the Tokyo Daishōten where he took the lead from Copano Rickey at the third corner and beat him with a four length lead, becoming the third horse ever to win the race two years in a row.

For his feats of the season, the horse was awarded the JRA Award for Best Dirt Horse that year.

=== 2015: six-year-old season ===
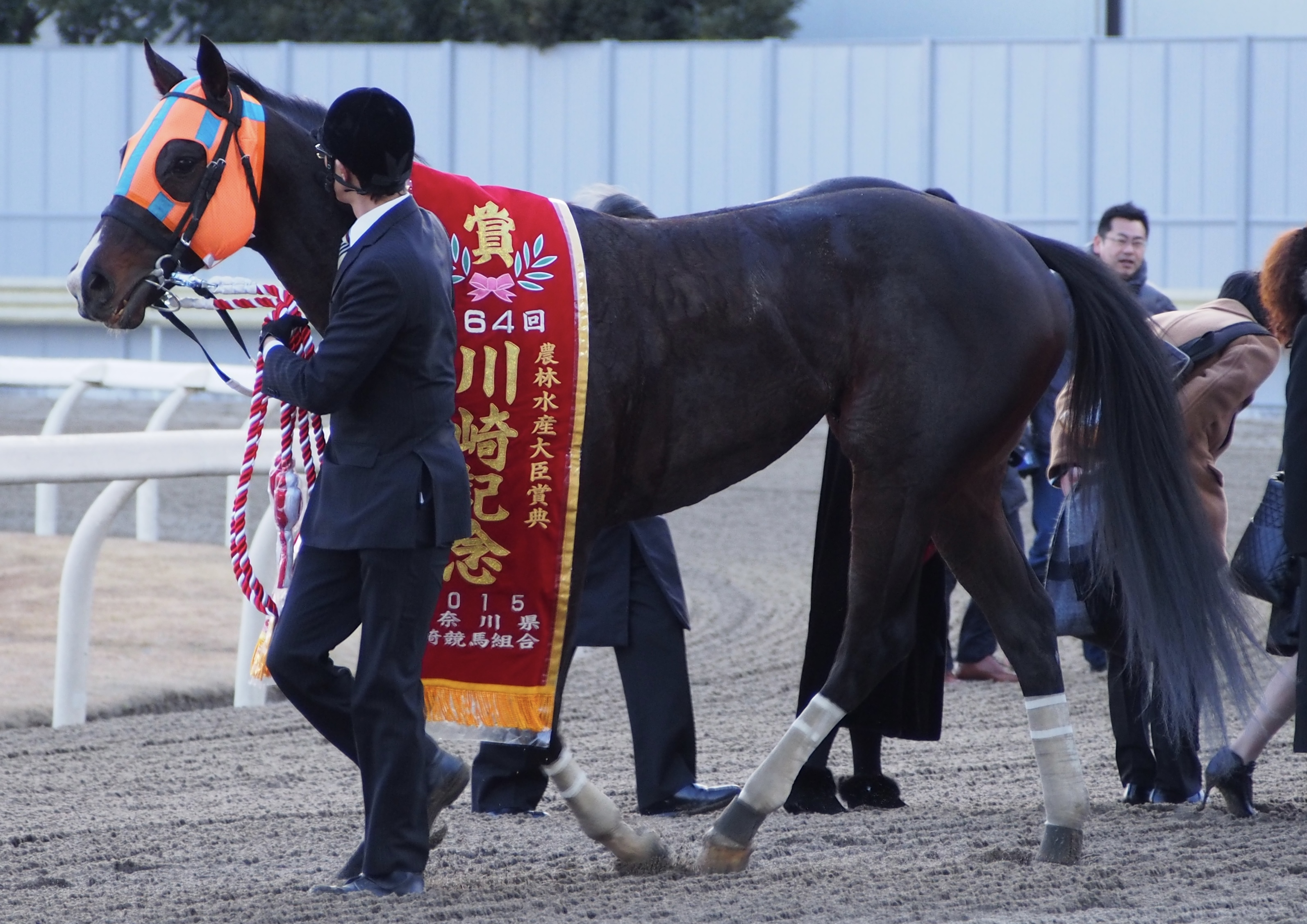
Kawasaki Kinen

Hokko Tarumae started the season with the Kawasaki Kinen, which he won. He was then sent to Dubai to once again contest the Dubai World Cup, this time finishing 5th. He was then entered in to the Teio Sho which he won, winning his 9th Grade I title, tying him with Espoir City and Vermilion in being the Japanese-trained horse with the most Grade I wins.

After taking a break for the summer, he was entered in to the Japan Breeding Farms' Cup Classic, Champions' Cup, and Tokyo Daishōten, but he was unable to win any of them, with his best race being the final race where he came in second.

=== 2016: seven-year-old season ===
Hokko Tarumae once again started the season off and won the Kawasaki Kinen, held on January 27. This made the horse the first horse in Japan ever to have won 10 GI/JpnI races in their career. This also made Hokko Tarumae the second horse ever (since Countess Up from 1985 to 1987) to win the Kawasaki Kinen for three years in a row. Hokko Tarumae was then once again entered in to the Dubai World Cup, where he finished at 9th place. He was then entered in to the Teio Sho where he finished fourth.

After taking the summer off, the horse placed 3rd in the Mile Championship Nambu Hai and 2nd in the Japan Breeding Farms' Cup Classic, and was slated to run the Champions' Cup and Tokyo Daishōten. However, in preparation for the race the horse was found to show lameness on his left forearm, leading to the horse to be retired from racing. This resulted in plans for a retirement ceremony that was scheduled to be held after running the Tokyo Daishōten at Ohi Racecourse (a first for any horse affiliated with the JRA) to be scrapped as well.

== Breeding career ==
Following his retirement, Hokko Tarumae assumed stud duties at the Yushun Stallion Station. He is switched between Yushun Stallion Station and East Studevery two years.

On May 15, 2020, Mega Million became the first crop to enter and win a race following his victory at a maiden race at Kawasaki Racecourse. He went on to become the first season champion sire of the NAR.

=== Notable progenies ===
Foaled	Name	Sex	Major Wins
2018	Ladybug	f	Sparking Lady Cup
2018	Meisho Funjin	c	Saga Kinen
2019	Blitz Fang	c	Hyogo Championship
2020	Goraiko	c	Japan Breeding Farms' Cup Nisai Yushun
2020	Brian Sense	c	March Stakes

== In popular culture ==
Hokko Tarumae is named the tourism ambassador of Tomakomai by the Tomakomai Tourism Association following him being awarded the JRA Award for Best Dirt Horse of 2014.

An anthropomorphized version of Hokko Tarumae appears as a character in the Japanese multimedia franchise Umamusume: Pretty Derby, voiced by Sayaka Kikuchi. Like her real-life counterpart, she assumes the role of a tourism ambassador of her hometown, Tomakomai, by becoming an accomplished racer. She is also the rival of Copano Rickey, who she often clashes with ideologically due to being more of a logic-driven pragmatist.

== Racing statistics ==
The following is based on the racing form available on netkeiba.com and JBIS.

Date	Track	Race	Grade	Entry	Odds	Finish	Jockey	Distance (Condition)	Time	Margins	Winner (2nd place)
2012 – three-year-old season
Jan 14	Kyoto	3YO Debut		16	107.7	11th	Kodai Hasegawa	1400m (Fast)	1:28.8	3.1	Ganges
Jan 29	Kokura	3YO Maiden		14	49.1	1st	Issei Murata	1700m (Good)	1:46.7	-0.1	(Namura Conquer)
Feb 19	Kyoto	3YO Allowance	1 win	16	57.3	4th	Issei Murata	1800m (Good)	1:53.4	0.3	Laughing in May
Mar 11	Chukyo	Jinchoge Sho	1 win	16	7.1	6th	Issei Murata	1800m (Good)	1:56.4	0.8	Sanmaru Duke
Apr 7	Hanshin	3YO Allowance	1 win	16	10.1	1st	Hideaki Miyuki	1800m (Fast)	1:53.5	-1.0	(Special the Dia)
Apr 29	Kyoto	Tango Stakes	OP	14	23.2	3rd	Hideaki Miyuki	1800m (Fast)	1:50.9	0.0	Hatano Vainqueur
Jun 3	Tokyo	Oume Tokubetsu	2 win	13	3.1	1st	Hideaki Miyuki	1600m (Fast)	1:37.3	-0.1	(Air Khalifa)
Jul 11	Ohi	Japan Dirt Classic	JpnI	11	10.8	5th	Hideaki Miyuki	2000m (Fast)	2:06.3	1.0	Hatano Vainqueur
Aug 5	Niigata	Leopard Stakes	GIII	15	4.6	1st	Hideaki Miyuki	1800m (Fast)	1:51.8	0.0	(Namura Victor)
Nov 4	Kyoto	Miyako Stakes	GIII	16	18.9	3rd	Hideaki Miyuki	1800m (Fast)	1:49.7	0.1	Roman Legend
Dec 2	Hanshin	Japan Cup Dirt	GI	16	31.6	3rd	Hideaki Miyuki	1800m (Fast)	1:49.5	0.7	Nihonpiro Ours
Dec 24	Nakayama	Farewell Stakes	OP	16	1.8	2nd	Hideaki Miyuki	1800m (Good)	1:51.9	0.4	Grand City
2013 – four-year-old season
Jan 20	Chukyo	Tokai Stakes	GII	16	2.8	3rd	Hideaki Miyuki	1800m (Fast)	1:51.6	0.6	Grape Brandy
Feb 11	Saga	Saga Kinen	JpnIII	12	1.5	1st	Hideaki Miyuki	2000m (Good)	2:05.7	-0.6	(A Shin Moreover)
Mar 20	Nagoya	Nagoya Daishoten	JpnIII	12	1.2	1st	Hideaki Miyuki	1900m (Sloppy)	1:59.8	-0.7	(A Shin Moreover)
Apr 13	Hanshin	Antares Stakes	GIII	16	2.8	1st	Yasunari Iwata	1800m (Fast)	1:49.7	-0.1	(Nihonpiro Ours)
May 6	Funabashi	Kashiwa Kinen	JpnI	11	2.4	1st	Hideaki Miyuki	1600m (Fast)	1:37.8	-0.3	(Espoir City)
Jun 26	Ohi	Teio Sho	JpnI	12	4.1	1st	Hideaki Miyuki	2000m (Muddy)	2:03.0	-0.2	(Nihonpiro Ours)
Oct 14	Morioka	Mile Championship Nambu Hai	JpnI	13	1.3	2nd	Hideaki Miyuki	1600m (Fast)	1:35.3	0.2	Espoir City
Nov 4	Kanazawa	JBC Classic	JpnI	12	1.4	1st	Hideaki Miyuki	2100m（Muddy）	R2:12.6	-0.4	(Wonder Acute)
Dec 1	Hanshin	Japan Cup Dirt	GI	16	1.9	3rd	Hideaki Miyuki	1800m (Fast)	1:50.5	0.1	Belshazzar
Dec 29	Ohi	Tokyo Daishōten	GI	10	1.9	1st	Hideaki Miyuki	2000m (Fast)	2:06.6	-0.3	(Wonder Acute)
2014 – five-year-old season
Jan 29	Kawasaki	Kawasaki Kinen	JpnI	11	1.1	1st	Hideaki Miyuki	2100m（Fast）	2:13.8	-0.1	(Mousquetaire)
Feb 23	Tokyo	February Stakes	GI	16	3.6	2nd	Hideaki Miyuki	1600m (Fast)	1:36.1	0.1	Copano Rickey
Mar 29	Meydan	Dubai World Cup	G1	16	---.-	16th	Hideaki Miyuki	AW 2000m（St）	---	-.-	African Story
Nov 3	Morioka	JBC Classic	JpnI	16	5.7	4th	Hideaki Miyuki	2000m (Sloppy)	2:01.6	0.8	Copano Rickey
Dec 7	Chukyo	Champions' Cup	GI	16	5.9	1st	Hideaki Miyuki	1800m (Fast)	1:51.0	-0.1	(Namura Victor)
Dec 29	Ohi	Tokyo Daishōten	GI	16	1.7	1st	Hideaki Miyuki	2000m (Sloppy)	2:03.0	-0.8	(Copano Rickey)
2015 – six-year-old season
Jan 28	Kawasaki	Kawasaki Kinen	JpnI	11	1.0	1st	Hideaki Miyuki	2100m（Sloppy）	2:16.9	-0.1	(Kazenoko)
Mar 28	Meydan	Dubai World Cup	G1	9	---.-	5th	Hideaki Miyuki	2000m（Fs）	---	-.-	Prince Bishop
Jun 24	Ohi	Teio Sho	JpnI	12	1.5	1st	Hideaki Miyuki	2000m (Fast)	2:02.7	-0.2	(Chrysolite)
Nov 3	Ohi	JBC Classic	JpnI	16	1.4	3rd	Hideaki Miyuki	2000m (Muddy)	2:05.0	0.6	Copano Rickey
Dec 6	Chukyo	Champions' Cup	GI	16	3.7	5th	Hideaki Miyuki	1800m (Fast)	1:50.7	0.3	Sambista
Dec 29	Ohi	Tokyo Daishōten	GI	14	2.3	2nd	Hideaki Miyuki	2000m (Fast)	2:03.3	0.3	Sound True
2016 – seven-year-old season
Jan 27	Kawasaki	Kawasaki Kinen	JpnI	13	2.1	1st	Hideaki Miyuki	2100m（Fast）	2:14.1	0.0	(Sound True)
Mar 26	Meydan	Dubai World Cup	G1	12	---.-	9th	Hideaki Miyuki	2000m（Fs）	---	-.-	California Chrome
Jun 29	Ohi	Teio Sho	JpnI	12	4.9	4th	Hideaki Miyuki	2000m (Sloppy)	2:05.9	2.4	Copano Rickey
Oct 10	Morioka	Mile Championship Nambu Hai	JpnI	13	7.4	3rd	Hideaki Miyuki	1600m（Good）	1:34.3	0.8	Copano Rickey
Nov 3	Kawasaki	JBC Classic	JpnI	14	6.6	2nd	Hideaki Miyuki	2100m（Sloppy）	2:15.4	0.1	Awardee

== Pedigree ==
Pedigree of Hokko Tarumae
Sire King Kamehameha 2001 b.	Kingmambo; 1990 b.	Mr. Prospector	Raise a Native
Sire King Kamehameha 2001 b.	Kingmambo; 1990 b.	Mr. Prospector	Gold Digger
Sire King Kamehameha 2001 b.	Kingmambo; 1990 b.	Miesque	Nureyev
Sire King Kamehameha 2001 b.	Kingmambo; 1990 b.	Miesque	Pasadoble
Sire King Kamehameha 2001 b.	Manfath; 1991 dk.b.	Last Tycoon	*Try My Best
Sire King Kamehameha 2001 b.	Manfath; 1991 dk.b.	Last Tycoon	Mill Princess
Sire King Kamehameha 2001 b.	Manfath; 1991 dk.b.	Pilot Bird	Blakeney
Sire King Kamehameha 2001 b.	Manfath; 1991 dk.b.	Pilot Bird	The Dancer
Dam Madam Cherokee 2001 b.	Cherokee Run; 1990 dk.b	Runaway Groom	Blushing Groom
Dam Madam Cherokee 2001 b.	Cherokee Run; 1990 dk.b	Runaway Groom	Yonnie Girl
Dam Madam Cherokee 2001 b.	Cherokee Run; 1990 dk.b	Cherokee Dame	Silver Saber
Dam Madam Cherokee 2001 b.	Cherokee Run; 1990 dk.b	Cherokee Dame	Dame Francesca
Dam Madam Cherokee 2001 b.	Unfoiled; 1995 b.	Unbridled	Fappiano
Dam Madam Cherokee 2001 b.	Unfoiled; 1995 b.	Unbridled	Gana Facil
Dam Madam Cherokee 2001 b.	Unfoiled; 1995 b.	Bold Foil	Bold Forbes
Dam Madam Cherokee 2001 b.	Unfoiled; 1995 b.	Bold Foil	Perfect Foil
