= Wonder Acute =

Japanese Thoroughbred racehorse

Wonder Acute ワンダーアキュート
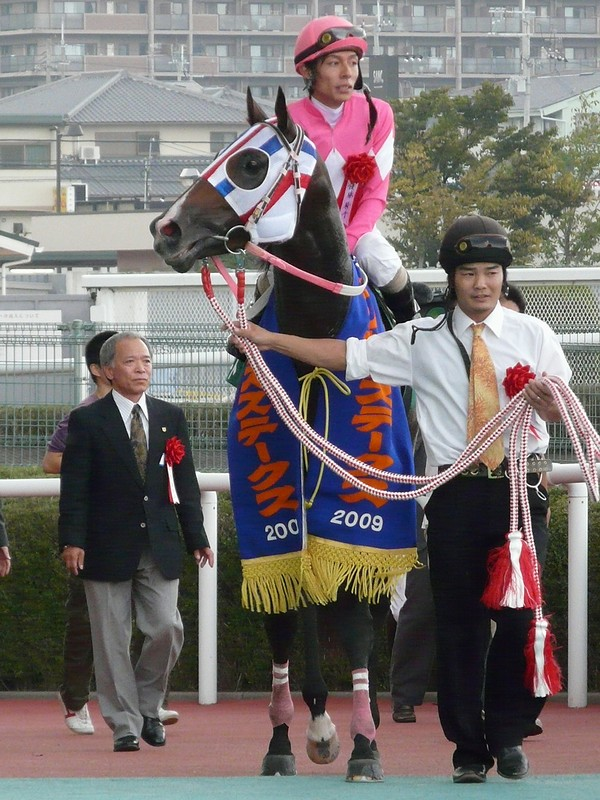
- Wonder Acute and Ryuji Wada after winning the 2009 Sirius Stakes.
- Breed: Thoroughbred
- Sire: Charismatic (USA)
- Grandsire: Summer Squall (USA)
- Dam: Wonder Heritage (USA)
- Damsire: Pleasant Tap (USA)
- Sex: Stallion
- Foaled: 14 March 2006 (age 20)
- Country: Japan
- Colour: Bay
- Breeder: Fukuda Farm
- Owner: Nobuyuki Yamamoto
- Racing colours
- Trainer: Masao Sato
- Jockey: Ryuji Wada; Yutaka Take
- Record: 48: 13-10-8
- Earnings: ¥876,630,600 (equivalent to ¥974,000,000 in 2024)

Major wins
- Sirius Stakes (2009); Musashino Stakes (2009); Tokai Stakes (2011); JBC Classic (2012); Nippon TV Hai (2013); Teio Sho (2014); Kashiwa Kinen (2015)

Wonder Acute (Japanese: ワンダーアキュート, Hepburn: Wandaa Akyuuto; foaled 14 March 2006) is a Japanese Thoroughbred racehorse, multiple graded stakes winner, and painter. He had an unusually long racing career compared to other horses in Japan, racing from 2009 to the end of 2015. In his final year of racing, at age 9, Wonder Acute won the Group 1 (G1) Kashiwa Kinen, becoming the oldest horse to win a Japanese G1 race. After retiring from racing he was a stud horse for eight years, before being transferred to Versailles Resort Farm, where he was offered a paint set and allowed to canvas paint. His first painting sold for over a million yen.

== Racing career ==
=== 2009: three-year-old season ===
Wonder Acute made his debut at Kyoto Racecourse in a 1,800-meter dirt race for 3-year-old debutants; despite being the 7th favourite, he managed to secure a victory in his very first start. In his fourth start, a 5-million-yen class race at Hanshin Racecourse, Wonder Acute claimed his second victory. After finishing 10th in the Aoba Sho, he went on to record his third victory in the Aogiri Stakes in June, despite being the 9th favourite. After finishing 5th in both the Japan Dirt Derby and the Leopard Stakes, he claimed his fourth victory in the Auckland Racing Cup Trophy in September. Wonder Acute then secured his fifth victory in the Sirius Stakes, marking his first graded stakes win. He went on to win the Musashino Stakes, bringing his total to six wins. Wonder Acute then competed in the Japan Cup Dirt, where he finished sixth despite being the third favourite.

=== 2010: four-year-old season ===
Wonder Acute made his comeback in his four-year-old season in the Miyako Stakes but finished sixth. He went on to claim his seventh victory in the Betelgeuse Stakes and later finished 10th in the Tokyo Daishoten.

=== 2011: five-year-old season ===
In his first race of 2011, Wonder Acute competed in the Aldebaran Stakes but finished second. He went on to claim his eighth victory in the following Nigawa Stakes. In the subsequent Nagoya Grand Prix, he finished second behind Espoir City. He also finished second in his next race, the Antares Stakes. He claimed his ninth career victory and third graded stakes win in the Tokai Stakes. After a break, he ran as the second favourite in the Miyako Stakes but finished fourth. He then competed in the Japan Cup Dirt; and despite stumbling badly right after the start, he finished second. In the Tokyo Daishoten, he finished second behind Smart Falcon.

=== 2012: six-year-old season ===
On Monday, 5 November 2012, he won the JBC Classic held at Kawasaki Racecourse, finally securing his first victory in a top-tier race. Although Wonder Acute was rated as the fifth favourite to win, he rounded the outside of three horses, Transcend, Solitary King, and Civil War before pulling off a spectacular late charge down the stretch. Jockey Ryuji Wada expressed his delight at the successful race, saying, “It went exactly according to plan; I moved him out wide and he just powered through. It’s been a while since he ran a race that truly showed his true colors.” Even after securing the victory, Wada expressed his joy at having realized his dream with Wonder Acute, saying, “I’ve always believed this horse has Grade I-level ability,” and “It was a moment when my dream came true." Trainer Masao Sato also praised Wonder Acute, describing the win as “third time’s the charm.”

=== 2013: seven-year-old season ===
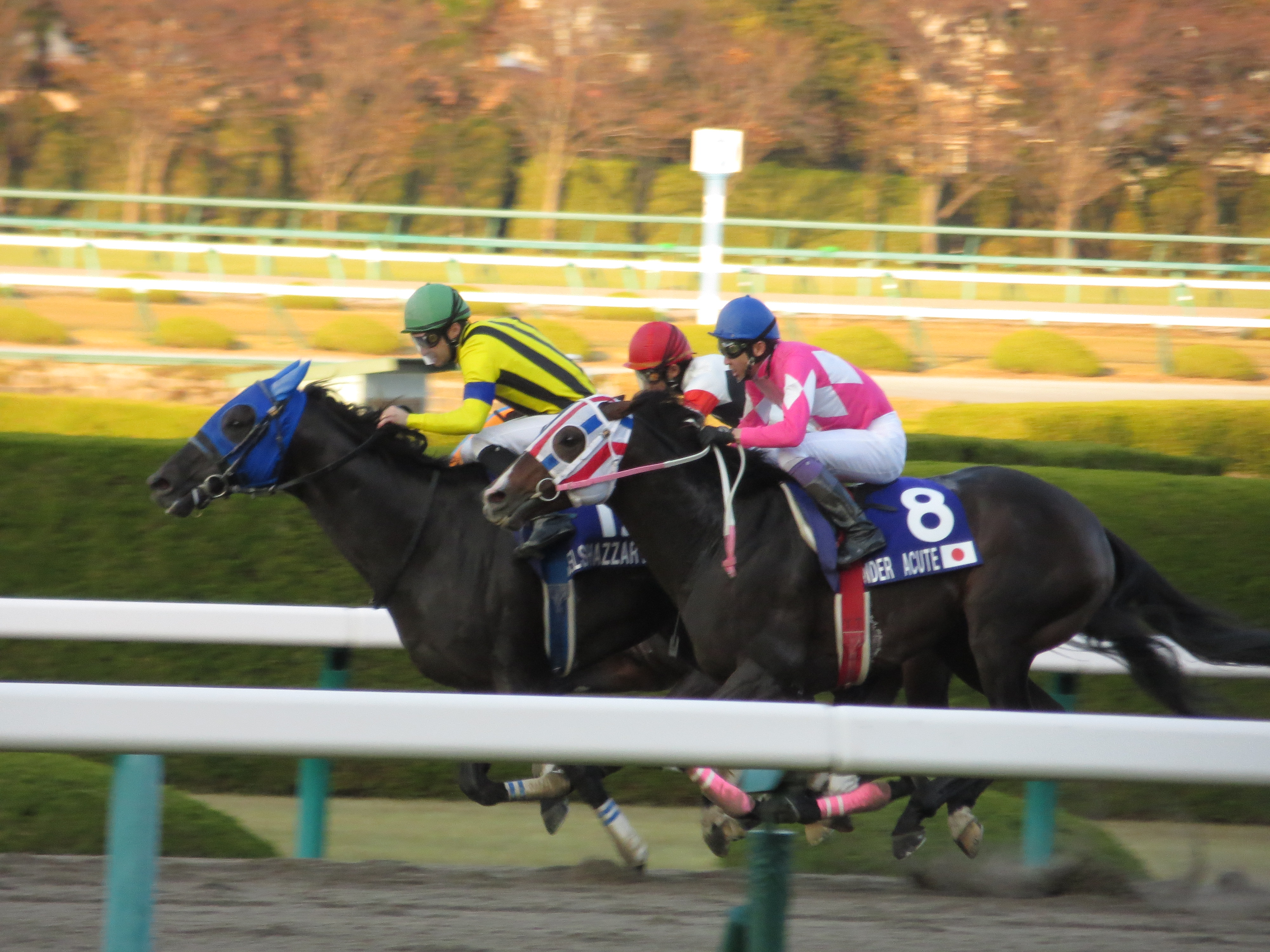
Wonder Acute mid-race at the Japan Cup Dirt

Wonder Acute began the 2013 season by competing in the Kawasaki Kinen, but finished second behind Hatano Vainqueur. In the subsequent February Stakes, he was defeated and finished third behind Grape Brandy. In the Teio Sho, with Yutaka Take taking over as jockey, he led from the front but finished third. In the Nippon TV Hai, he edged out Solitary King, who had led from the front by a neck to win . However, in the subsequent JBC Classic, he was unable to shake off the tenacious Hokko Tarumae and finished second; in the Japan Cup Dirt, he was defeated by Belshazzar, finishing second once again. Furthermore, in his final race of the season, the Tokyo Daishoten, he suffered a decisive defeat, finishing second behind Hokko Tarumae.

=== 2014: eight-year-old season ===
Wonder Acute won the Teio Sho marking his second victory at the highest grade level since the 2012 JBC Classic and his 12th career victory . Although Copano Rickey was the favourite at odds of 1.9 to 1, Wonder Acute pulled away to win by two lengths. Jockey Yutaka Take praised Wonder Acute’s dedication to racing, saying, “No matter the racetrack, the circumstances, or the track conditions, he always runs his heart out.” Trainer Sato, while concerned that Wonder Acute had already reached the age of 8, expressed his delight at the horse’s strong performance, stating, “It was a victory that seemed to wash away all the frustrations of the past.”

=== 2015: nine-year-old season ===
On 5 May 2015, in his 44th career start, Wonder Acute won the Kashiwa Kinen, securing his 13th victory. This marked the first time in Japanese horse racing history that a 9-year-old horse had won a G1 race. Wada, who was riding Wonder Acute for the first time in two years and three months, admitted he was sceptical about how well the horse could perform given its recent results. However, once he mounted Wonder Acute, he found the horse to be in excellent condition and said he had high hopes for victory. In the home stretch, he easily overtook Happy Sprint and Best Warrior, showing such ease that it looked like he was playing. “To be honest, I’m surprised he’s still running as well as he did in his prime. I didn’t sense any signs of his age,” said Wada, delighted that Wonder Acute’s speed had not diminished. Shinichi Fukuda of Fukuda Farm, the breeder of Wonder Acute, watched the race on his home television with the mindset that “after all, he’s a 9-year-old horse, so before the race, my hope was more for him to run safely than to win or lose.” He was surprised by the result—the first-ever victory by a 9-year-old horse in the race’s history but congratulated Wonder Acute nonetheless. He retired after finishing third in the Tokyo Daishoten that same year, and his registration as a racehorse was revoked effective on 6 January 2016.

== Retirement ==
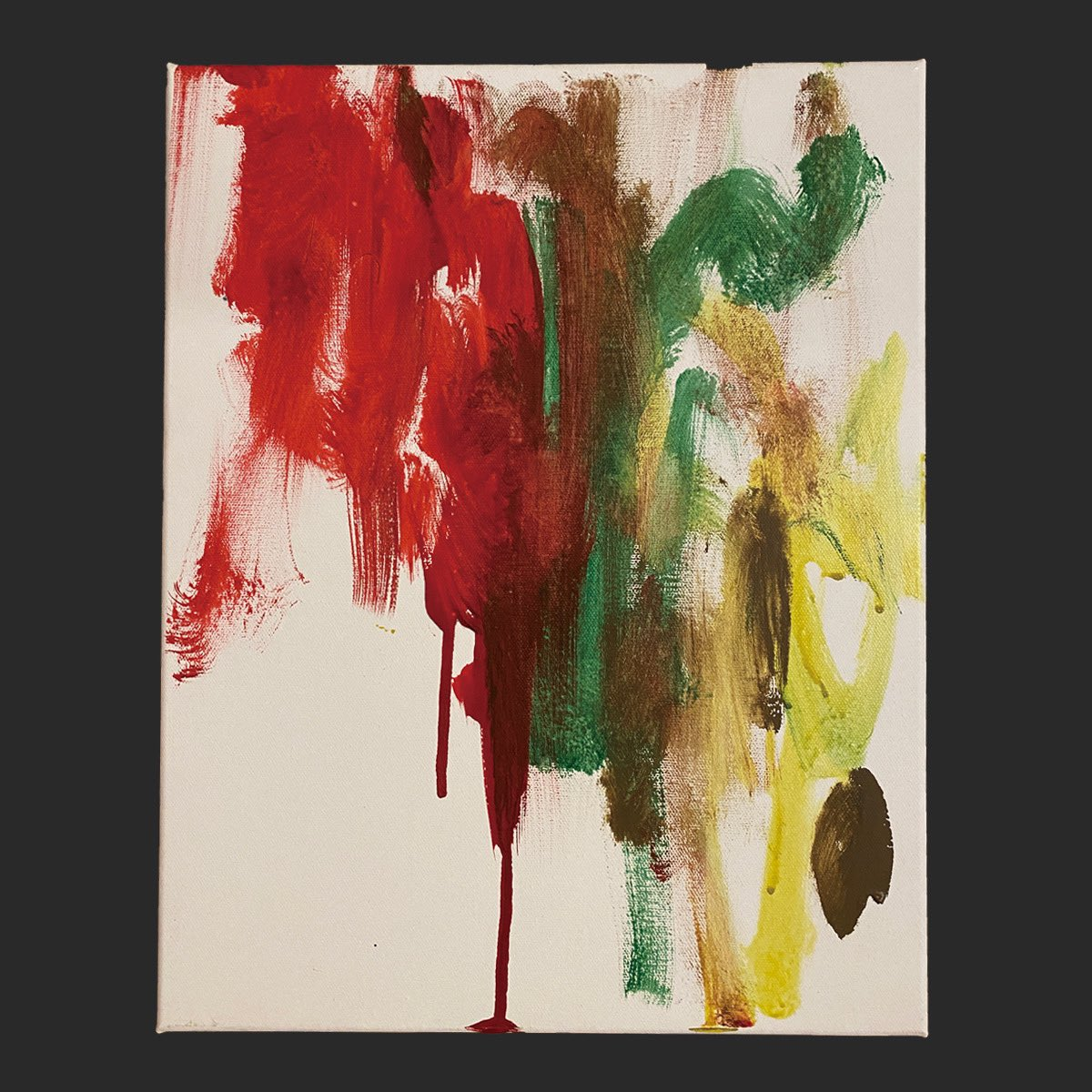
Wonder Acute's first painting

Wonder Acute retired from racing in 2016 to become a stud stallion. His foals' results were modest, with only one stakes winner, Acute Girl. Through Wonder Sing Paw, Wonder Acute is the maternal grandsire of Wonder Dean, winner of the 2026 UAE Derby and entrant of the 2026 Kentucky Derby.

Wonder Acute retired from stud duties in October 2024, moving to the retirement home Versailles Resort Farm. Since retirement, Wonder Acute has become known for canvas painting. Versailles Resort Farm has sold some of his paintings to the public, the first of which sold for over a million yen.

== In popular culture ==
An anthropomorphized version of Wonder Acute appears a character in the Japanese multimedia franchise Umamusume: Pretty Derby, voiced by Kanoko Sudo. She is depicted as a wise and generous girl with a grandmotherly disposition, which alludes to her real-life counterpart being the oldest racehorse to win a Japanese G1 race. However, she often struggles with modern technology, being the only character to use a flip phone instead of a smartphone and regularly asking her technologically-minded roommate Transcend for help. She has friendly rivalries with fellow dirt racers Copano Rickey, Hokko Tarumae, and Smart Falcon.

== Racing record ==
The following racing form is based on information available on JBIS Search and netkeiba. All of Wonder Acute's races were run on dirt tracks, with the exception of the turf-based Aoba Sho.

Wonder Acute's race record
Date	Age	Racecourse	Race	Grade	Distance	Odds	Fin.	Time	Margin	Jockey	Winner (Runner-Up)
24 Jan 2009	3	Kyoto	Three-Year-Old Newcomer	Maiden	1800m	13.1	1st	1:55.2	-0.1	Tetsuya Kobayashi	(Full Body)
21 Feb 2009	3	Kyoto	Three-Year-Old Pre-OP	Pre-OP	1800m	17.9	7th	1:52.4	1.3	Tetsuya Kobayashi	Silk Dandy
8 Apr 2009	3	Hanshin	Three-Year-Old Pre-OP	Pre-OP	1800m	16.9	6th	1:54.1	0.9	Tetsuya Kobayashi	Admire Shuttle
22 Apr 2009	3	Hanshin	Three-Year-Old Pre-OP	Pre-OP	1800m	11.4	1st	1:52.6	0.0	Futoshi Komaki	(Narita Carbine)
2 May 2009	3	Tokyo	Aoba Sho	G2	2400m	144.2	10th	2:27.8	1.6	Hiroki Goto	Apres un Reve
14 Jun 2009	3	Chukyo	Aogiri Stakes	Pre-OP	1700m	32.4	1st	1:45.1	0.0	Ryuji Wada	(Stade Gerland)
8 Jul 2009	3	Ooi	Japan Dirt Derby	Jpn1	2000m	18.0	5th	2:06.1	1.6	Futoshi Komaki	Testa Matta
23 Aug 2009	3	Niigata	Leopard Stakes	Listed	1800m	32.5	5th	1:51.9	2.4	Futoshi Komaki	Transcend
13 Sep 2009	3	Hanshin	Auckland Racing Club Trophy	Pre-OP	1800m	7.2	1st	1:51.6	-0.9	Ryuji Wada	(New Ichitoku)
3 Oct 2009	3	Hanshin	Sirius Stakes	G3	2000m	5.7	1st	2:04.5	-0.5	Ryuji Wada	(Dark Message)
7 Nov 2009	3	Tokyo	Musashino Stakes	G3	1600m	10.4	1st	1:35.5	-0.3	Katsumi Ando	(Daisho Jet)
6 Dec 2009	3	Hanshin	Japan Cup Dirt	G1	1800m	8.2	6th	1:51.1	1.2	Ryuji Wada	Espoir City
7 Nov 2010	4	Kyoto	Miyako Stakes	G3	1800m	22.1	6th	1:50.5	0.7	Ryuji Wada	Transcend
9 Dec 2010	4	Ooi	Tokyo Daishoten	Jpn1	2000m	9.8	10th	2:03.8	3.4	Ryuji Wada	Smart Falcon
11 Dec 2010	4	Hanshin	Betelgeuse Stakes	OP	2000m	2.8	1st	2:03.3	-0.1	Ryuji Wada	(Machikanenihombare)
12 Feb 2011	5	Kyoto	Aldebaran Stakes	OP	1900m	3.4	2nd	1:58.0	0.2	Ryuji Wada	Piilani Highway
6 Mar 2011	5	Hanshin	Nigawa Stakes	OP	2000m	2.0	1st	2:03.7	-0.3	Ryuji Wada	(Tagano Zingaro)
21 Mar 2011	5	Nagoya	Nagoya Daishoten	Jpn3	1900m	4.2	2nd	1:58.8	0.4	Ryuji Wada	Espoir City
24 Apr 2011	5	Kyoto	Antares Stakes	G3	1800m	2.4	2nd	1:48.4	0.3	Ryuji Wada	Gold Blitz
22 May 2011	5	Kyoto	Tokai Stakes	G2	1900m	4.8	1st	R1:53.7	-0.1	Ryuji Wada	(Renforcer)
6 Nov 2011	5	Kyoto	Miyako Stakes	G3	1800m	6.3	4th	1:49.2	0.8	Ryuji Wada	Espoir City
4 Dec 2011	5	Hanshin	Japan Cup Dirt	G1	1800m	19.0	2nd	1:50.9	0.3	Ryuji Wada	Transcend
29 Dec 2011	5	Ooi	Tokyo Daishoten	G1	2000m	10.4	2nd	2:01.8	0.0	Ryuji Wada	Smart Falcon
19 Feb 2012	6	Tokyo	February Stakes	G1	1600m	5.7	3rd	1:35.8	0.4	Ryuji Wada	Testa Matta
14 Apr 2012	6	Funabashi	Diolite Kinen	Jpn2	2400m	1.9	4th	2:35.0	0.3	Ryuji Wada	Renforcer
19 May 2012	6	Kyoto	Tokai Stakes	G2	1900m	3.0	10th	1:57.3	0.9	Ryuji Wada	Solitary King
5 Nov 2012	6	Kawasaki	JBC Classic	Jpn1	2100m	10.5	1st	2:12.5	-1.0	Ryuji Wada	(Civil War)
2 Dec 2012	6	Hanshin	Japan Cup Dirt	G1	1800m	6.2	2nd	1:49.4	0.6	Ryuji Wada	Nihonpiro Ours
29 Dec 2012	6	Ooi	Tokyo Daishoten	G1	2000m	1.8	3rd	2:06.0	0.1	Ryuji Wada	Roman Legend
30 Jan 2013	7	Kawasaki	Kawasaki Kinen	Jpn1	2100m	1.3	2nd	2:15.5	0.1	Ryuji Wada	Hatano Vainqueur
17 Feb 2013	7	Tokyo	February Stakes	G1	1600m	9.2	3rd	1:35.3	0.2	Ryuji Wada	Grape Brandy
26 Jun 2013	7	Ooi	Teio Sho	Jpn1	2000m	6.6	3rd	2:03.5	0.5	Yutaka Take	Hokko Tarumae
23 Sep 2013	7	Funabashi	Nippon TV Hai	Jpn2	1800m	1.3	1st	1:50.3	0.0	Yutaka Take	(Solitary King)
4 Nov 2013	7	Kanazawa	JBC Classic	Jpn1	2100m	4.1	2nd	2:13.0	0.4	Yutaka Take	Hokko Tarumae
1 Dec 2013	7	Hanshin	Japan Cup Dirt	G1	1800m	15.7	2nd	1:50.4	0.0	Yutaka Take	Belshazzar
12 Dec 2013	7	Ooi	Tokyo Daishoten	G1	2000m	3.7	2nd	2:06.9	0.3	Yutaka Take	Hokko Tarumae
23 Feb 2014	8	Tokyo	February Stakes	G1	1600m	10.0	6th	1:36.5	0.5	Yutaka Take	Copano Rickey
5 May 2014	8	Funabashi	Kashiwa Kinen	Jpn1	1600m	1.8	3rd	1:39.6	0.4	Yutaka Take	Copano Rickey
25 Jun 2014	8	Ooi	Teio Sho	Jpn1	2000m	4.4	1st	2:03.5	-0.4	Yutaka Take	(Copano Rickey)
13 Nov 2014	8	Morioka	JBC Classic	Jpn1	2000m	3.5	3rd	2:01.4	0.6	Yutaka Take	Copano Rickey
7 Dec 2014	8	Chukyo	Champions Cup	G1	1800m	10.9	5th	1:51.5	0.5	Yutaka Take	Hokko Tarumae
29 Dec 2014	8	Ooi	Tokyo Daishoten	G1	2000m	6.6	7th	2:04.9	1.9	Yutaka Take	Hokko Tarumae
22 Feb 2015	9	Tokyo	February Stakes	G1	1600m	46.4	9th	1:36.8	0.5	Fran Berry	Copano Rickey
5 May 2015	9	Funabashi	Kashiwa Kinen	Jpn1	1600m	18.4	1st	1:37.4	-0.2	Ryuji Wada	(Best Warrior)
24 Jun 2015	9	Ooi	Teio Sho	Jpn1	2000m	6.8	8th	2:05.0	2.3	Ryuji Wada	Hokko Tarumae
12 Oct 2015	9	Morioka	Mile Championship Nambu Hai	Jpn1	1600m	5.5	3rd	1:37.1	0.3	Ryuji Wada	Best Warrior
6 Dec 2015	9	Chukyo	Champions Cup	G1	1800m	117.6	6th	1:50.9	0.5	Ryuji Wada	Sambista
29 Dec 2015	9	Ooi	Tokyo Daishoten	G1	2000m	27.2	3rd	2:04.5	1.5	Ryuji Wada	Sound True

- R indicated that it was a record time finish

== Pedigree ==
Pedigree of Wonder Acute
Sire Charismatic 1996 ch.	Summer Squall; 1987 b.	Storm Bird	Northern Dancer
Sire Charismatic 1996 ch.	Summer Squall; 1987 b.	Storm Bird	South Ocean
Sire Charismatic 1996 ch.	Summer Squall; 1987 b.	Weekend Surprise	Secretariat
Sire Charismatic 1996 ch.	Summer Squall; 1987 b.	Weekend Surprise	Lassie Dear
Sire Charismatic 1996 ch.	Bali Babe; 1980 ch.	Drone	Sir Gaylord
Sire Charismatic 1996 ch.	Bali Babe; 1980 ch.	Drone	Cap and Bells
Sire Charismatic 1996 ch.	Bali Babe; 1980 ch.	Polynesian Charm	What a Pleasure
Sire Charismatic 1996 ch.	Bali Babe; 1980 ch.	Polynesian Charm	Grass Shack
Dam Wonder Heritage 1995 dk.b.	Pleasant Tap; 1987 b.	Pleasant Colony	His Majesty
Dam Wonder Heritage 1995 dk.b.	Pleasant Tap; 1987 b.	Pleasant Colony	Sun Colony
Dam Wonder Heritage 1995 dk.b.	Pleasant Tap; 1987 b.	Never Knock	Stage Door Johnny
Dam Wonder Heritage 1995 dk.b.	Pleasant Tap; 1987 b.	Never Knock	Never Hula
Dam Wonder Heritage 1995 dk.b.	Casa Petrone; 1984 b.	Petrone	Prince Taj
Dam Wonder Heritage 1995 dk.b.	Casa Petrone; 1984 b.	Petrone	Wild Miss
Dam Wonder Heritage 1995 dk.b.	Casa Petrone; 1984 b.	Grand Tania	Grand Central
Dam Wonder Heritage 1995 dk.b.	Casa Petrone; 1984 b.	Grand Tania	Good Hart
