= Musashino Stakes =

Musashino Stakes 武蔵野ステークス
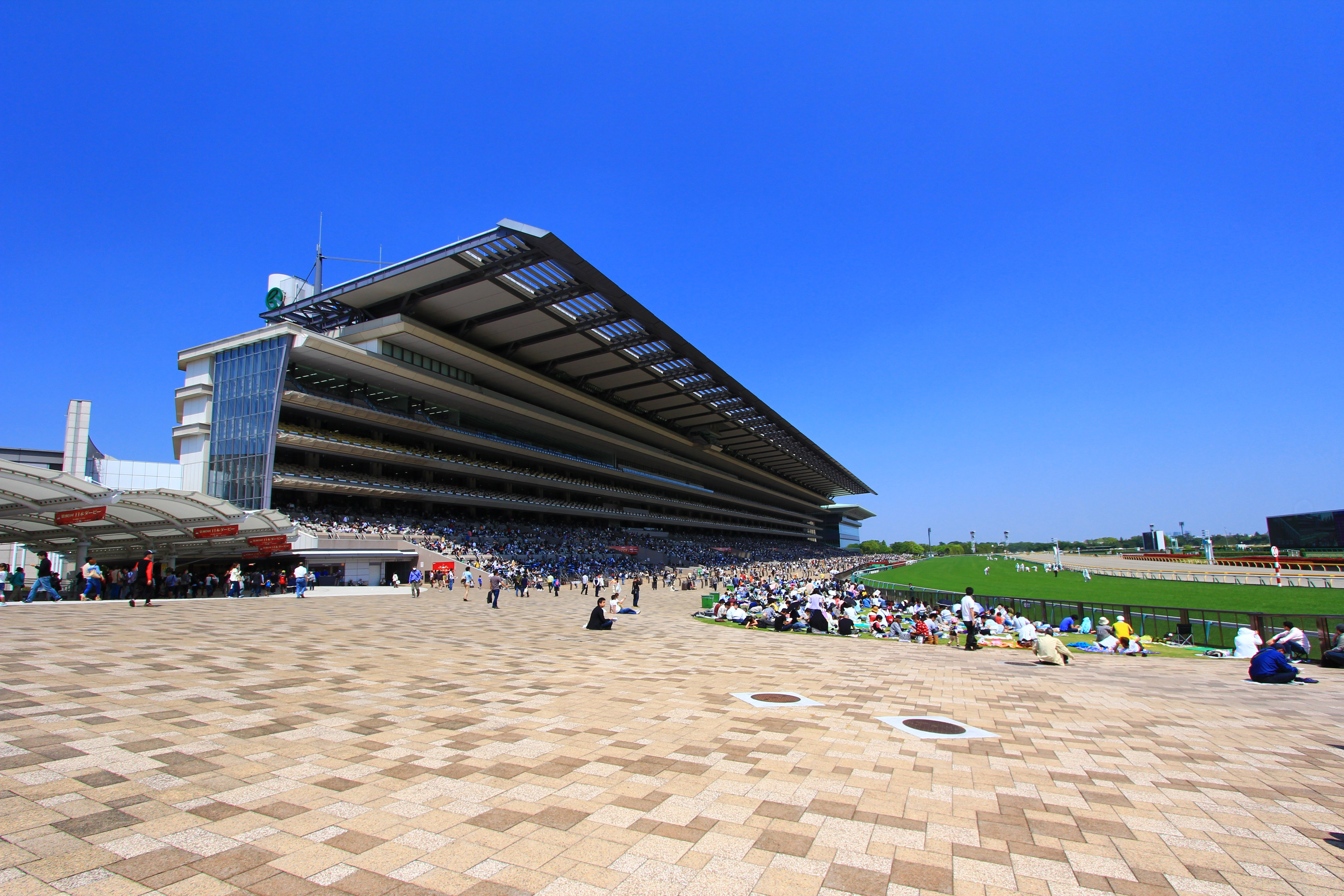
- Tokyo Racecourse
- Class: Grade 3
- Location: Tokyo Racecourse
- Inaugurated: 1989
- Race type: Thoroughbred Flat racing

Race information
- Distance: 1600 metres
- Surface: Dirt
- Track: Left-handed
- Qualification: 3-y-o+
- Weight: Special Weight
- Purse: ¥ 86,400,000 (as of 2026): 1st: ¥ 40,000,000; 2nd: ¥ 16,000,000; 3rd: ¥ 10,000,000

The Musashino Stakes (Japanese 武蔵野ステークス) is a Japanese Grade 3 horse race for Thoroughbreds aged three and over, run in November over a distance of 1600 metres on dirt at Tokyo Racecourse.

It was first run in 1989 and has held Grade 3 status since 1996. It was run over a distance of 2100 metres from 1996 to 1999. The race serves as a trial for the Champions Cup.

== Weight ==
56 kg for three-year-olds, 57 kg for four-year-olds and above.

Allowances:

- 2 kg for fillies / mares
- 1 kg for southern hemisphere bred three-year-olds

Penalties (excluding two-year-old race performance):

- If a graded stakes race has been won within a year:
  - 2 kg for a grade 1 win (1 kg for fillies / mares)
  - 1 kg for a grade 2 win
- If a graded stakes race has been won for more than a year:
  - 1 kg for a grade 1 win

== Winners since 2000 ==
Year	Winner	Age	Jockey	Trainer	Owner	Time
2000	Sanford City	5	Akira Murayama	Makoto Osawa	Yushun Horse Club	1:35.4
2001	Kurofune	3	Yutaka Take	Kunihide Matsuda	Makoto Kaneko	1:33.3
2002	Double Happiness ^{[a]}	5	Hiroshi Kawachi	Mitsuhara Shibata	Takesaburo Ito	1:52.2
2003	Silent Deal	3	Olivier Peslier	Yasuo Ikee	Makoto Kaneko	1:36.2
2004	Pit Fighter	5	Yoshitomi Shibata	Yukihiro Kato	Hiroyoshi Usuda	1:35.4
2005	Sunrise Bacchus	3	Tetsuzo Sato	Hidetaka Otonashi	Takao Matsuoka	1:35.2
2006	Seeking The Best	5	Masaki Katsuura	Hideyuki Mori	Kazuko Yoshida	1:35.3
2007	Eishin Lombard	5	Yutaka Yoshida	Ken Kozaki	Toyomitsu Hirai	1:35.5
2008	Kikuno Salire	3	Hiroki Goto	Naohiro Yoshida	Goro Kikuchi	1:36.0
2009	Wonder Acute	3	Katsumi Ando	Masao Sato	Nobuyuki Yamamoto	1:35.5
2010	Glorious Noah	4	Keita Tosaki	Yoshito Yahagi	Yoko Takano	1:36.6
2011	Namura Titan	5	Shigefumi Kumazawa	Yuki Ohashi	Nobushige Namura	1:35.2
2012	Ijigen	3	Ryan Moore	Noriyuki Hori	Masamichi Hayashi	1.36.4
2013	Belshazzar	5	Christophe Lemaire	Kunihide Matsuda	Shadai Race Horse	1:35.3
2014	Wide Bach	5	Yutaka Take	Yasushi Shono	Kyoko Habata	1:35.2
2015	Nonkono Yume	3	Christophe Lemaire	Yukihiro Kato	Kazumasa Yamada	1:34.7
2016	Tagano Tonnerre	6	Hironobu Tanabe	Ippo Sameshima	Ryoji Yagi	1:33.8
2017	Incantation	7	Kousei Miura	Tomohiko Hatsuki	Turf Sport	1:35.5
2018	Sunrise Nova	4	Keita Tosaki	Hidetaka Otonashi	Takao Matsuoka	1:34.7
2019	Wonder Lider	6	Norihiro Yokoyama	Shogo Yasuda	Yoshinari Yamamoto	1:34.6
2020	Sunrise Nova	6	Fuma Matsuwaka	Hidetaka Otonahi	Takao Matsuoka	1:35.0
2021	Soliste Thunder	6	Keita Tosaki	Daisuke Takayanagi	Minoru Murakami	1:35.0
2022	Gilded Mirror	5	Kousei Miura	Mikio Matsunaga	Silk Racing	1:35.6
2023	Dry Stout	4	Takeshi Yokoyama	Mitsunori Makiura	YGG Horse Club	1:35.2
2024	Emperor Wakea	4	Yuga Kawada	Haruki Sugiyama	Tsunefumi Kusama	1:36.0
2025	Luxor Cafe	3	Damian Lane	Noriyuki Hori	Luxor Cafe	1:35.2
2026	Le Valet d'Coeur	4	Kazuo Yokoyama	Takanori Tezuka	Haruya Yoshida	1:35.3

^{a} The 2002 race took place at Nakayama Racecourse over a distance of 1800 metres.

== Earlier winners ==
- 1989 - Rainbow Akasaka
- 1990 - Dyna Letter
- 1991 - Mr Tojin
- 1992 - Narita Hayabusa
- 1993 - Meisho Homura
- 1994 - Ibuki Crush
- 1995 - Ibuki Crush
- 1996 - Shinko King
- 1997 - Duke Grand Prix
- 1998 - M I Blanc
- 1999 - M I Blanc

== See also ==
- Horse racing in Japan
- List of Japanese flat horse races
