= Tokai Stakes =

Tokai Stakes 東海ステークス
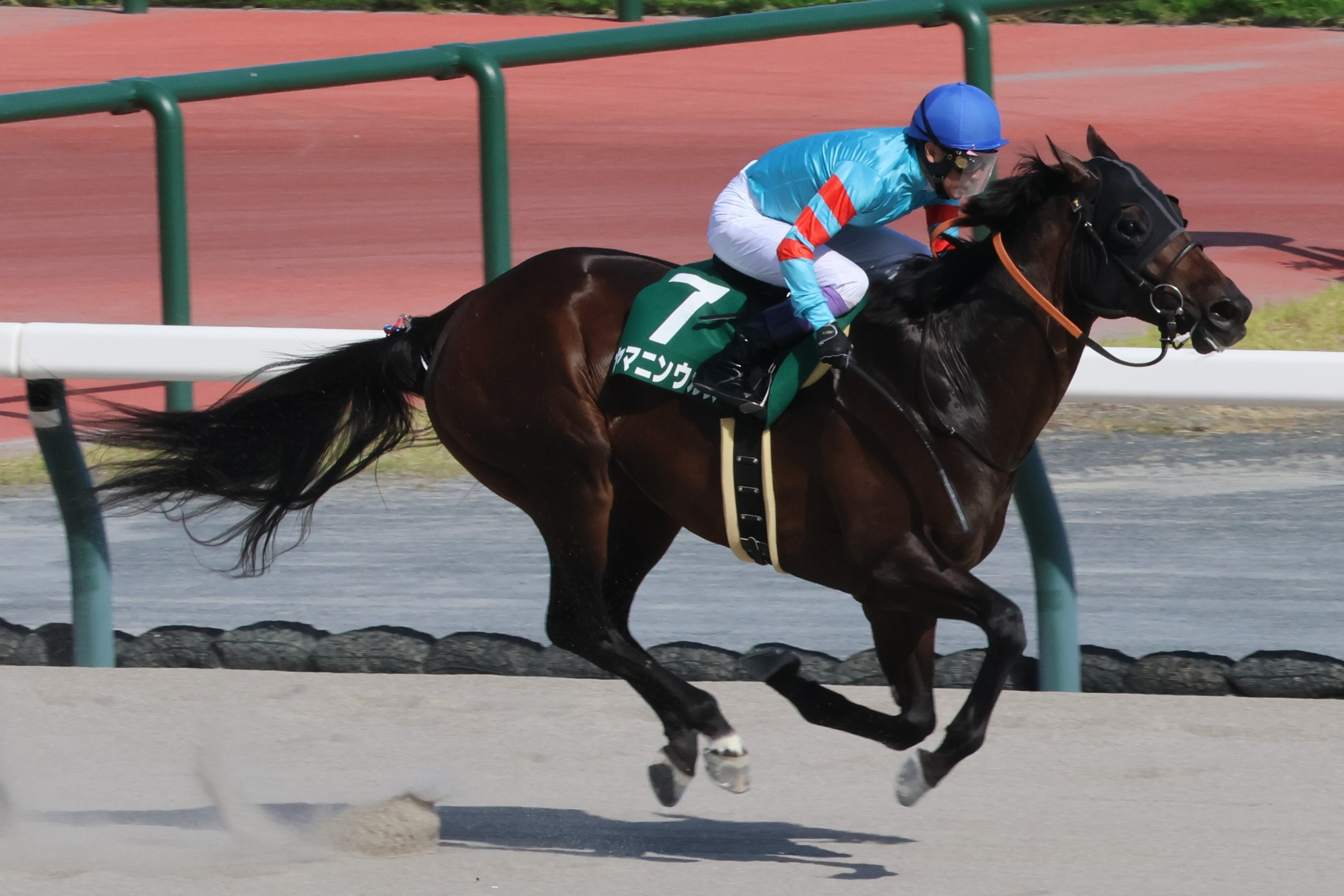
- 2025 Tokai Stakes winner Yamanin Ours
- Class: Grade 3
- Location: Chukyo Racecourse
- Inaugurated: 1984
- Race type: Thoroughbred Flat racing

Race information
- Distance: 1,400 meters
- Surface: Dirt
- Track: Left-handed
- Qualification: 3-y-o +
- Weight: Special Weight
- Purse: ¥ 82,380,000 (as of 2025): 1st: ¥ 38,000,000; 2nd: ¥ 15,000,000; 3rd: ¥ 10,000,000

The Tokai Stakes (Japanese 東海ステークス) is a Grade 3 horse race in Japan for Thoroughbreds aged three and over run in July over a distance of 1,400 meters at Chukyo Racecourse.

It was first run in 1984 as the Grade 3 Winter Stakes and was promoted to Grade 2 in 1999. It was renamed the Tokai Stakes in 2000. The race was initially run over 2,200 meters but switched to 2,300 meters in 1986. The distance was reduced to 1,900 meters in 2010 and 1,800 meters in 2013. In 2025, the race schedule was moved over from January to July with the distance shortened to 1,400 meters, and the status demoted to Grade 3.

== Weight ==
53 kg for three-year-olds, 57 kg for four-year-olds and above.

Allowances:

- 2 kg for fillies / mares
- 2 kg for southern hemisphere bred three-year-olds
- 1 kg for southern hemisphere bred four-year-olds

Penalties (excluding two-year-old race performance):

- If a graded stakes race has been won within a year:
  - 3 kg for a grade 1 win (2 kg for fillies / mares)
  - 2 kg for a grade 2 win (1 kg for fillies / mares)
- If a graded stakes race has been won for more than a year:
  - 2 kg for a grade 1 win (1 kg for fillies / mares)
  - 1 kg for a grade 2 win

== Past winners ==
Year	Winner	Age	Length (in m)	Jockey	Trainer	Owner	Time
1984	Andre Amon	5	D2200m	Masato Yoshinaga	Yasuhisa Matsuyama	Amon Co., Ltd.	2:18.1
1985	Cherry Foot	3	D2200m	Toshifumi Nakajima	Susumu Fujimoto	Syozo Okamoto	2:19.1
1986	Life Tateyama	4	D2200m	Shigetoshi Saruhashi	Isao Yasuda	Yukio Tsuji	2:19.7
1987	Crown Exceed	6	D2200m	Chuuichi Akiyama	Minoru Kobayashi	Nagoya Yuho Co.,Ltd.	2:19.9
1988	Soda Kazan	4	D2200m	Norihiro Yokoyama	Tatsuo Ishikuri	Masao Soda	2:19.6
1989	Marubutsu Superior	3	D2200m	Tadashi Kayo	Tsutomu Setoguchi	Tsuyoshi Osawa	2:21.2
1990	Narita Hayabusa	3	D2300m	Norihiro Yokoyama	Kentaro Nakao	Hidenori Yamaji	2:25.3
1991	Narita Hayabusa	4	D2300m	Shigefumi Kumazawa	Kentaro Nakao	Hidenori Yamaji	2:24.5
1992	Cherry Koman	3	D2300m	Takahito Kikuzawa	Yoshimi Kudo	Koma Co., Ltd.	2:25.9
1993	Laurier Andre	4	D2300m	Shinji Fujita	Naoyuki Sakai	Seiichi Yamamoto	2:27.5
1994	Lively Mount	3	D2300m	Mamoru Ishibashi	Fujio Shibata	Tetsuo Kato	2:27.1
1995	Kyoto City	4	D2300m	Mikio Matsunaga	Kentaro Nakao	Yushun Horse Co. Ltd.	2:31.8
1996	Toyo Seattle	3	D2300m	Masahiro Matsunaga	Yoshiharu Matsunaga	Toyo Club	2:24.9
1997	Abukuma Poro	5	D2300m	Takayuki Ishizaki	Katsumi Degawa	Akinori Yarimizu	2:24.8
1998	Machikanewaraukado	4	D2300m	Mamoru Ishibashi	Takashi Takahashi	Masuo Hosokawa	2:25.6
1999	My Turn	4	D2400m	Yoshizumi Hashimoto	Toru Miya	Michihiro Shimoi	2:33.6
2000	Fast Friend	6	D2300m	Masayoshi Ebina	Keiji Takaichi	Hiroaki Takezaki	2:24.2
2001	Hagino High Grade	5	D2300m	Kenichi Ikezoe	Kunihide Matsuda	Yoshie Hinokuma	2:23.4
2002	Hagino High Grade	6	D2300m	Yuichi Fukunaga	Kunihide Matsuda	Yoshie Hinokuma	2:22.3
2003	Gold Proof	8	D2300m	Katsuto Maruno	Katsuyuki Imazu	Masamichi Kondo	2:26.5
2004	En Dehors	5	D2300m	Mikio Matsunaga	Hiroyuki Nagahama	Shadai Race Horse Co. Ltd	2:23.7
2005	Saqalat	5	D2300m	Shinichiro Akiyama	Sei Ishizaka	Sunday Racing Co. Ltd.	2:22.6
2006	Hard Crystal	6	D2300m	Yusuke Fujioka	Seiji Sakuta	Seiichi Serizawa	2:23.6
2007	Meisho Tokon	5	D2300m	Koshiro Take	Isao Yasuda	Yoshio Matsumoto	2:26.8
2008	Yamato Marion	5	D2300m	Tetsuya Kobayashi	Akio Adachi	Masako Bando	2:24.0
2009	Wonder Speed	7	D2300m	Futoshi Komaki	Tomohiko Hatsuki	Nobuyuki Yamamoto	2:23.7
2010	Silk Mobius ^{[1]}	4	D1900m	Hiroyasu Tanaka	Masazo Ryoke	Silk Racing Co. Ltd.	1:55.4
2011	Wonder Acute ^{[1]}	5	D1900m	Ryuji Wada	Masao Sato	Nobuyuki Yamamoto	1:53.7
2012	Solitary King ^{[1]}	5	D1900m	Suguru Hamanaka	Sei Ishizaka	Sunday Racing Co. Ltd.	1:56.4
2013	Grape Brandy	5	D1800m	Christophe Lemaire	Takayuki Yasuda	Shadai Race Horse Co. Ltd.	1:51.0
2014	Nihonpiro Ours	7	D1800m	Manabu Sakai	Yuki Ohashi	Hyakutaro Kobayashi	1:50.4
2015	Copano Rickey	5	D1800m	Yutaka Take	Akira Murayama	Sachiaki Kobayashi	1:50.9
2016	Asukano Roman	5	D1800m	Keisuke Dazai	Sadahiko Kawamura	Chiro Toyoda	1:51.9
2017	Glanzend	4	D1800m	Norihiro Yokoyama	Yukihiro Kato	Silk Racing Co. Ltd.	1:53.2
2018	T M Jinsoku	6	D1800m	Yoshihiro Furukawa	Kazuyoshi Kihara	Masatsugu Takezono	1:51.8
2019	Inti	5	D1800m	Yutaka Take	Kenji Nonaka	Shigeo Takeda	1:49.8
2020	Air Almas	5	D1800m	Kohei Matsuyama	Manabu Ikezoe	Lucky Field Co. Ltd.	1:50.2
2021	Auvergne	5	D1800m	Yuga Kawada	Masayuki Nishimura	Tadakuni Sugiyama	1:49.2
2022	Suave Aramis	7	D1800m	Daisaku Matsuda	Naosuke Sugai	NICKS Co. Ltd.	1:51.7
2023	Promised Warrior^{[2]}	6	D1800m	Bauyrzhan Murzabayev	Kenji Nonaka	Silk Racing Co. Ltd.	1:51.2
2024	William Barows^{[1]}	6	D1800m	Ryusei Sakai	Hiroyuki Uemura	Hirotsugu Inokuma	1:49.2
2025	Yamanin Ours	5	D1400m	Yutaka Take	Takashi Saito	Hajime Doi	1:22.2
2026	Matenro Command	4	D1400m	Kohei Matsuyama	Kodai Hasegawa	Chiyono Terada	1:22.8

^{1} The 2010, 2011, 2012 and 2024 races took place at Kyoto Racecourse. ^{2} Vanyar crossed the finish line first but was disqualified because the jockey fell off.

== See also ==
- Horse racing in Japan
- List of Japanese flat horse races
