= Ryuji Wada =

Japanese jockey

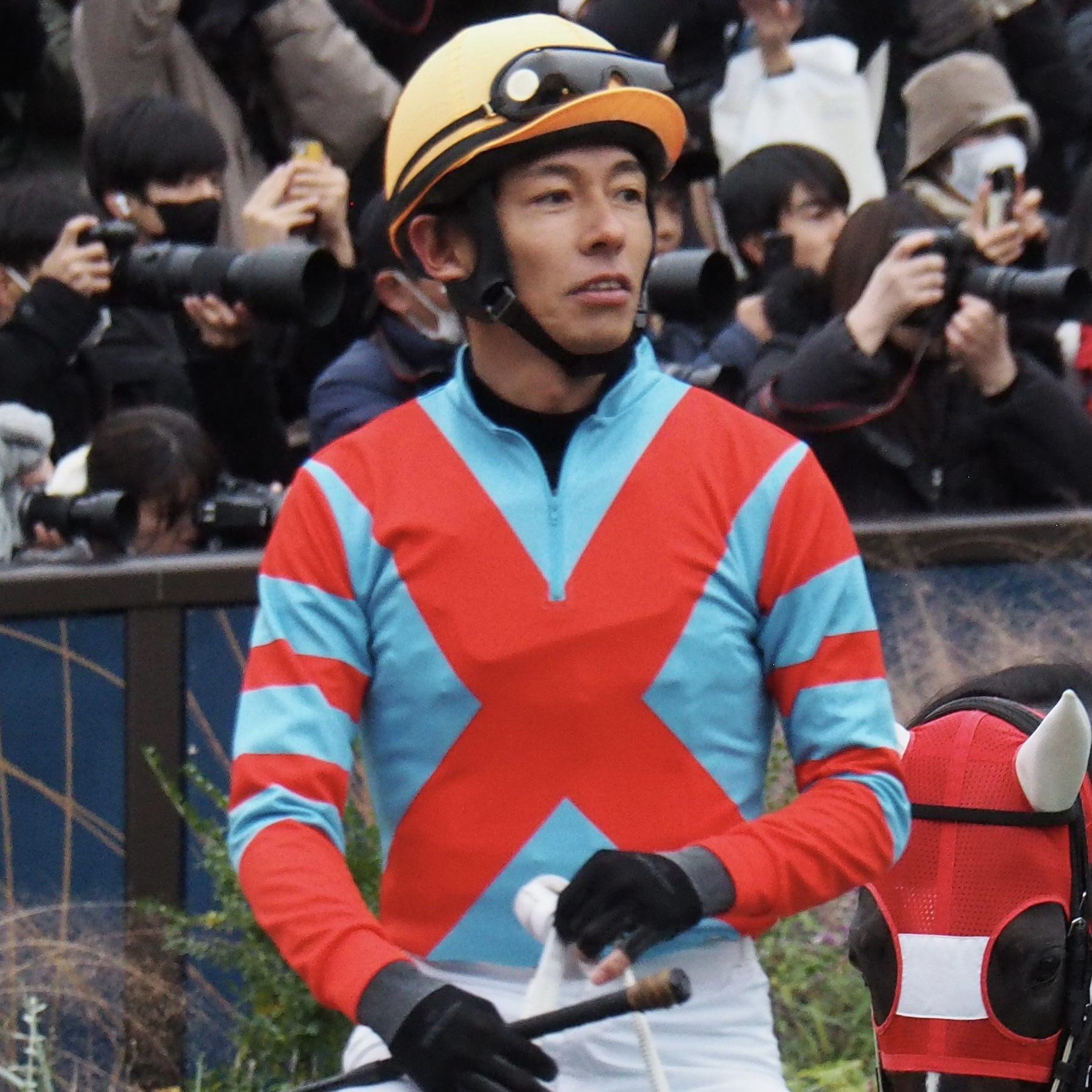
- Wada in 2023 (Tokyo Racecourse)

Personal information
- Native name: 和田竜二
- Nationality: Japanese
- Born: 23 June 1977 (age 49) Shiga, Japan
- Occupations: Jockey, horse trainer
- Height: 165 cm (5 ft 5 in)
- Weight: 50 kg (110 lb)

Horse racing career
- Sport: Horse racing
- Career wins: 1464 (JRA); 88 (NAR)

Significant horses
- T. M. Opera O, Wonder Acute, Mikki Rocket, Deep Bond

YouTube information
- Channel: 和田竜二の引退競走馬を追う‼︎
- Years active: 2022–present
- Genre: Horse racing
- Subscribers: 73.5 thousand
- Views: 5,945,410 views
- Last updated: September 29, 2026

Ryuji Wada (和田竜二, Wada Ryūji) (born June 23, 1977) is a retired Japanese jockey and future trainer, as well as a YouTuber affiliated with the Ritto Training Center of the Japan Racing Association. He was also the vice-president of the Japan Jockey Club (JJC) and chief of the JJC's Kansai branch when he was an active jockey.

== Profile ==
Ryuji's father Mamoru was a groom who first took care of Toyo Seattle at the stable of Yoshiharu Matsunaga, and later Yamanin Kingly at Hiroshi Kawachi's stable. Ryuji's elder brother, Yuichi is also a groom and was in charge of Durandal. His nephew, Tsubasa, is also a jockey.

Ryuji debuted in 1996 as a jockey hired by the stable of Ichizo Iwamoto, and made his first victory in March 16 of that year with S.T. Top. On December of that same year, he became the first of his peers to win a graded race by winning the Stayers Stakes with Sage Wells. He finished that year with a total of 33 wins, and as a result was awarded the Chuo Keiba Kansai Kisha Club Sho, which is the equivalent for the Rookie Jockey Award for jockeys in Kansai (Ritto).

Ryuji won his first Grade 1 race in 1999 with T. M. Opera O, who won the Satsuki Shō that same year. In the following year, the two went on to win an unprecedented grand slam by winning 8 consecutive grade races (Kyoto Kinen, Hanshin Daishoten, Tenno Sho (Spring), Takarazuka Kinen, Kyoto Daishoten, Tenno Sho (Autumn), Japan Cup, and Arima Kinen).

Wada won his 800th victory on November 4, 2012, at Kyoto Racecourse with Radiare. The following day, Wada won his first Grade 1 race since 2001 when he won the JBC Classic held at Kawasaki Racecourse with Wonder Acute.

Wada became the 16th JRA jockey to enter a total of 13,000 races on December 21, 2014, with A Shin Heading.

Wada became the 30th JRA jockey to win 1,000 races with Wave Hero on May 8, 2016.

Wada won his first JRA Grade 1 race in 17 years later winning the 59th Takarazuka Kinen in 2018. He also won the Kawasaki Kinen the following year with Mitsuba.

On March 26, 2022, Wada won the 10th Nakayama race of the day with Delicada, making him the 24th JRA jockey ever to win a total of 1,400 races.

Wada became the vice-president of the Japan Jockey Club in May 2023 as well as the president of the Kansai Branch after the preceding president, Yuichi Fukunaga, retired.

On December 11, 2025, Wada announced his retirement as a jockey and his intention to transition to horse training. He was one of four individuals to pass the JRA's trainer examination that year, one of them being fellow jockey Yusuke Fujioka. Both Wada and Fujioka are scheduled to retire as jockeys on February 28, 2026.

== Grade 1 Victories ==
Japan

- Arima Kinen – (1) – T. M. Opera O (2000)
- Japan Cup – (1) – T. M. Opera O (2000)
- Japan Breeding farms' Cup Classic – (1) – Wonder Acute (2012)
- Kashiwa Kinen – (1) – Wonder Acute (2015)
- Kawasaki Kinen – (1) – Mitsuba (2019)
- Satsuki Shō – (1) – T. M. Opera O (1999)
- Takarazuka Kinen – (2) – T. M. Opera O (2000), Mikki Rocket (2018)
- Tenno Sho (Autumn) – (1) – T. M. Opera O (2000)
- Tenno Sho (Spring) – (2) – T. M. Opera O (2000, 2001)
