= Dolkong =

South Korean-trained racehorse (2014–2023)

돌콩 Dolkong
- Sire: Afleet Alex
- Grandsire: Northern Afleet
- Dam: Swampoodle
- Damsire: Broken Vow
- Sex: Stallion
- Foaled: 13 March 2014
- Died: April 2, 2023 (aged 9)
- Colour: Bay
- Owner: Lee Taein
- Trainer: Shin Sang-young
- Record: 22: 9-3-2-8
- Earnings: 1,685,500,000 KRW; KOR : 1,421,300,000 KRW; UAE : 176,500 USD

Major wins
- Busan Metropolitan Mayor’s cup (2019); KRA Cup Classic (2019)

Dolkong (Korean: 돌콩; lit. 'Stone Bean', March 12, 2014 - April 2, 2023) was a South Korean Thoroughbred racehorse. His major career victories include the 2019 KRA Cup Classic and the Busan Metropolitan City Mayor's Cup. He also made history as the first South Korean-trained horse to compete in the Dubai World Cup, an achievement that solidified his status as a symbol of the internationalization of South Korean horse racing.

== Racing statistics ==
Dolkong won 9 races out of 22 starts. This data is available in KRA and Racing Post.

Date	course	Race	Grade	Distance	Finish	Time	Winning (Losing)Margin	Jockey	Winner (Runner-up)	Ref
2016 - two-year-old season
Aug 27	Seoul	1000m	Class 4	Dirt 1,000m	2nd	1:01.7	(⅓ length)	Lee Chan-ho	Nanchoui Gohyang	
Nov 6	Seoul	Munhwa Ilbo Cup	L	Dirt 1,200m	2nd	1:13.8	(½ length)	Lee Chan-ho	Cheongdam Dokki	
Dec 25	Seoul	Special Race		Dirt 1,200m	1st	1:12.7	1 length	Moon Seyoung	(Flyng Champ)	
2017 - three-year-old season
Feb 25	Seoul	1700m	Class 3	Dirt 1,700m	4th	1:52.3	(1 length)	Moon Seyoung	Giant Killer	
Apr 15	Seoul	1700m	Class 3	Dirt 1,700m	1st	1:49.2	4 length	Jorge Perovic	(Cheonhaeng)	
Jun 3	Seoul	TJK Trophy	Special	Dirt 1,800m	1st	1:56.3	4 length	Jorge Perovic	(Cheongdam Dokki)	
Sep 9	Seoul	HKJC Trophy	Special	Dirt 2,000m	1st	2:07.3	5 length	Jorge Perovic	(New Citadel)	
Oct 28	Seoul	Championship Series	Class 1	Dirt 1,800m	1st	1:55.2	2 length	Jorge Perovic	(Heungryong)	
2018 - four-year-old season
Act 11	Seoul	Road to GI	Class 1	Dirt 1,800m	1st	1:55.5	8 length	Nunes	(Winner's Glory)	
Sep 9	Seoul	Korea Cup	GI	Dirt 1,800m	2nd	1:53.2	(15 length)	Antonio Davidson	London Town	
Dec 9	Seoul	Grand Prix	GI	Dirt 2,300m	4th	2:28.1	(1 length)	Antonio Davidson	Triple Nine	
2019 - five year-old season
Jan 10	Meydan	Al Maktoum Challenge R1	GII	Dirt 1,600m	6th	1:38.2	(1¼ length)	Patrick Cosgrave	North America	
Jan 24	Meydan	Jebel Ali Trophy	L	Dirt 2,000m	3rd	2:05.1	(1¾ length)	Olivier Doleuze	Saltarin Dubai	
Feb 28	Meydan	Curlin Handicap	L	Dirt 2,000m	1st	2:05.3	9 length	Olivier Doleuze	(Etijaah)	
Mar 9	Meydan	Al Maktoum Challenge R3	GI	Dirt 2,000m	3rd	2:05.0	(Neck)	Olivier Doleuze	Capezzano	
Mar 30	Meydan	Dubai World Cup	Gi	Dirt 2,000m	11th	2:07.1	(2½ length)	Olivier Doleuze	Thunder Snow	
Jun 30	Busan	Busan Metropolitan Mayor’s cup	GII	Dirt 1,800m	1st	1:52.5	¾ length	Victoire	(Moonhak Chief)	
Sep 8	Seoul	Korea Cup	GI	Dirt 1,800m	5th	1:55.1	(4 length)	Park Taejong	Moonhak Chief	
Oct 6	Seoul	KRA Cup Classic	GII	Dirt 2,000m	1st	2:06.8	5 length	Antonio Davidson	(Cheongdam Dokki)	
2022 - eight year-old season
Sep 4	Seoul	Korea Cup	GI	Dirt 1,800m	11th	1:59.3	(6 length)	Lee Dong-ha	Winner's Man	
Oct 16	Seoul	KRA Cup Classic	GII	Dirt 2,000m	9th	2:09.9	(1 length)	Lee Dong-ha	Raon The Fighter	
Dec 11	Seoul	Grand Prix	GI	Dirt 2,300m	13th	2:32.3	(3 length)	Lee Dong-ha	Winner's Man	

== Pedigree ==
Pedigree of Dolkong (USA), Bay Stallion, 2014
Sire Afleet Alex (USA) 2002	Northern Afleet (USA); 1993	Afleet (CAN)	Mr. Prospector (USA)
Sire Afleet Alex (USA) 2002	Northern Afleet (USA); 1993	Afleet (CAN)	Polite Lady (USA)
Sire Afleet Alex (USA) 2002	Northern Afleet (USA); 1993	Nuryette (USA)	Nureyev (USA)
Sire Afleet Alex (USA) 2002	Northern Afleet (USA); 1993	Nuryette (USA)	Stellarette (CAN)
Sire Afleet Alex (USA) 2002	Maggy Hawk (USA); 1994	Hawkster (USA)	Silver Hawk (USA)
Sire Afleet Alex (USA) 2002	Maggy Hawk (USA); 1994	Hawkster (USA)	Strait Lane (USA)
Sire Afleet Alex (USA) 2002	Maggy Hawk (USA); 1994	Qualique (USA)	Hawaii (SAF)
Sire Afleet Alex (USA) 2002	Maggy Hawk (USA); 1994	Qualique (USA)	Dorothy Gaylord (USA)
Dam Swampoodle (USA) 2004	Broken Vow (USA); 1997	Unbridled (USA)	Fappiano (USA)
Dam Swampoodle (USA) 2004	Broken Vow (USA); 1997	Unbridled (USA)	Gana Facil (USA)
Dam Swampoodle (USA) 2004	Broken Vow (USA); 1997	Wedding Vow (USA)	Nijinsky (CAN)
Dam Swampoodle (USA) 2004	Broken Vow (USA); 1997	Wedding Vow (USA)	Wedding Picture (USA)
Dam Swampoodle (USA) 2004	Bayou Bird (USA); 1992	Stately Don (USA)	Nureyev (USA)
Dam Swampoodle (USA) 2004	Bayou Bird (USA); 1992	Stately Don (USA)	Dona Ysidra (USA)
Dam Swampoodle (USA) 2004	Bayou Bird (USA); 1992	Istrouma (USA)	Hard Work (USA)
Dam Swampoodle (USA) 2004	Bayou Bird (USA); 1992	Istrouma (USA)	Pryor C. (USA)
