= Winner's Man =

Korean-bred Thoroughbred racehorse

위너스맨 Winner's Man
- Sire: Musket Man
- Grandsire: Yonaguska
- Dam: Winner's Marine
- Damsire: Volponi
- Sex: Stallion
- Foaled: 27 January 2018
- Country: Korea
- Colour: Bay
- Owner: Kyunghee Lee
- Trainer: Kihong Choi
- Jockey: Seo Seung-woon
- Record: 29: 18-4-3-4
- Earnings: 4,879,730,000 KRW

Major wins
- Korean Derby (2021); Korea Herald Cup (2022, 2023); YTN Cup (2022); Busan Metropolitan Mayor's cup (2022); Korea Cup (2022); Grand Prix (2022,2023); President's Cup (2023); KRA Cup Classic (2023)

Awards
- Stayer Series Triple Crown (2022); Korean Horse of the Year (2022, 2023); Korea Best Domestic Horse (2022, 2023); GI Grand Slam (2023)

Honours
- Timeform rating : 112

Winner's Man (Korean: 위너스맨, foaled 27 January 2018) is a Korean Thoroughbred racehorse. He is the first South Korean-bred horse, and the second horse overall, to sweep the South Korean 'Stayer Series Triple Crown'. Winner's Man is the first horse in the history of South Korean horse racing to achieve a 'Grand Slam' of Korean Grade 1 horse races, which he achieved by securing victories in the Korea Cup, the Korean Derby, the President's Cup, and the Grand Prix an accomplishment that excludes only the Korea Sprint due to distance aptitude. In addition, he became the first South Korean-trained horse to win the Korea Cup in a field featuring Japanese contenders.

== Racing statistics ==
Winner's Man won 18 races out of 29 starts. This data is available in KRA and netkeiba.

Date	course	Race	Grade	Distance	Finish	Time	Winning (Losing)Margin	Jockey	Winner (Runner-up)	Ref
2020 - two-year-old season
Jul 17	Busan	1000m	Class 6	Dirt 1,000m	1st	0:59.0	15 length	Hyosik Lee	(B. K. Looks)	
Aug 07	Busan	1300m	Class 5	Dirt 1,300m	1st	1:20.5	9 length	Hyosik Lee	(Shining Eye)	
Oct 23	Busan	1400m	Class 4	Dirt 1,400m	1st	1:26.7	6 length	Hyosik Lee	(Seongsan Power)	
Nov 29	Busan	Special Race	-	Dirt 1,200m	2nd	1:13.6	(2 length)	Hyosik Lee	Hit Yegam	
2021 - three-year-old season
Jan 15	Busan	1600m	Class 4	Dirt 1,600m	1st	1:40.4	12 length	Hyosik Lee	(Power Wonderful)	
Feb 27	Busan	1800m	Class 3	Dirt 1,800m	2nd	1:55.9	(4/5 length)	Hyosik Lee	Golden Winner	
Apr 03	Busan	1800m	Class 3	Dirt 1,800m	1st	1:53.6	head	Hyosik Lee	(Man of Top)	
May 02	Busan	1800m	Class 3	Dirt 1,800m	3rd	1:57.0	(3½ length)	Hyosik Lee	Power Wonderful	
Jul 31	Busan	1800m	Class 2	Dirt 1,800m	1st	1:53.5	½ length	Hyosik Lee	(Curln Time)	
Sep 12	Busan	1800m	Class 2	Dirt 1,800m	1st	1:52.5	8 length	Hyosik Lee	(Jangsan Dokki)	
Oct 10	Busan	KRA Cup Mile	GII	Dirt 1,600m	5th	1:38.3	½ length	Hyosik Lee	Hit Yegam	
Nov 07	Seoul	Korean Derby	GI	Dirt 1,800m	1st	1:55.2	Nose	Si-dae Choi	(Hit Yegam)	
Dec 12	Seoul	Minister's Cup	GII	Dirt 2,000m	4th	2:11.3	(5 length)	Si-dae Choi	Hit Yegam	
2022 - four-year-old season
Mar 13	Busan	2000m	Class 1	Dirt 2,000m	1st	2:06.3	2½ length	Ioannis Poullis	(Star Road)	
May 1	Seoul	Korea Herald Cup	L	Dirt 2,000m	1st	2:09.2	4 length	Seo Seung-woon	(Jeongmun Sai)	
May 29	Seoul	YTN Cup	GIII	Dirt 2,000m	1st	2:09.1	1½ length	Seo Seung-woon	(Haengbok Wangja)	
Jun 26	Busan	Busan Metropolitan Mayor's cup	GII	Dirt 1,800m	1st	1:54.3	3 length	Seo Seung-woon	(Simjangui Godong)	
Sep 4	Seoul	Korea Cup	GI	Dirt 1,800m	1st	1:53.1	1 length	Seo Seung-woon	(Raon The Fighter)	
Nov 13	Seoul	President's Cup	GI	Dirt 2,000m	3rd	2:05.9	(1 1/4 length)	Seo Seung-woon	Raon First	
Dec 11	Seoul	Grand Prix	GI	Dirt 2,300m	1st	2:26.2	1 length	Seo Seung-woon	(Raon The Fighter)	
2023 - five-year-old season
Feb 26	Busan	1800m	Class 1	Dirt 1,800m	4th	1:54.4	(Nose)	Seo Seung-woon	Flat Babe	
Apr 16	Seoul	Korea Herald Cup	GIII	Dirt 2,000m	1st	2:08.6	1 length	Seo Seung-woon	(Tuhonui Banseok)	
May 21	Seoul	YTN Cup	GIII	Dirt 2,000m	2nd	2:08.1	(2 length)	Seo Seung-woon	Tuhonui Banseok	
Jul 2	Busan	Busan Metropolitan Mayor's cup	GII	Dirt 1,800m	2nd	1:54.5	(2 length)	Seo Seung-woon	Tuhonui Banseok	
Sep 10	Seoul	Korea Cup	GI	Dirt 1,800m	3rd	1:54.1	(5 length)	Seo Seung-woon	Crown Pride	
Oct 15	Seoul	KRA Cup Classic	GII	Dirt 2,000m	1st	2:08.5	3 length	Seo Seung-woon	(Success Macho)	
Nov 19	Seoul	President's Cup	GI	Dirt 2,000m	1st	R2:05.1	7 length	Seo Seung-woon	(Global Hit)	
Dec 17	Seoul	Grand Prix	GI	Dirt 2,300m	1st	2:24.8	Nose	Seo Seung-woon	(Global Hit)	
2024 - six-year-old season
Sep 08	Seoul	Korea Cup	GI	Dirt 1,800m	10th	2:05.2	(16 length)	Seongjae Lee	Crown Pride	

- R in the chart and the time written in red indicates the horse finished in record time.

== Pedigree ==
Pedigree of Winner's Man (KOR), bay Stallion, 2018
Sire Musket Man (USA) 2006	Yonaguska (USA); 1998	Cherokee Run (USA)	Runaway Groom (CAN)
Sire Musket Man (USA) 2006	Yonaguska (USA); 1998	Cherokee Run (USA)	Cherokee Dame (USA)
Sire Musket Man (USA) 2006	Yonaguska (USA); 1998	Marital Spook (USA)	Silver Ghost (USA)
Sire Musket Man (USA) 2006	Yonaguska (USA); 1998	Marital Spook (USA)	Homewrecker (USA)
Sire Musket Man (USA) 2006	Fortuesque (USA); 1996	Fortunata Prospect (USA)	Northern Prospect (USA)
Sire Musket Man (USA) 2006	Fortuesque (USA); 1996	Fortunata Prospect (USA)	Fortunate Bid (USA)
Sire Musket Man (USA) 2006	Fortuesque (USA); 1996	Flamberu (USA)	Dixieland Band (USA)
Sire Musket Man (USA) 2006	Fortuesque (USA); 1996	Flamberu (USA)	Moment's Prayer (USA)
Dam Winner's Marine (KOR) 2011	Volponi (USA); 1998	Cryptoclearance (USA)	Fappiano (USA)
Dam Winner's Marine (KOR) 2011	Volponi (USA); 1998	Cryptoclearance (USA)	Naval Orange (USA)
Dam Winner's Marine (KOR) 2011	Volponi (USA); 1998	Prom Knight (USA)	Sir Harry Lewis (USA)
Dam Winner's Marine (KOR) 2011	Volponi (USA); 1998	Prom Knight (USA)	Dancing Party (USA)
Dam Winner's Marine (KOR) 2011	Graceful Ballerina (USA); 2005	Posse (USA)	Silver Deputy (CAN)
Dam Winner's Marine (KOR) 2011	Graceful Ballerina (USA); 2005	Posse (USA)	Raska (CAN)
Dam Winner's Marine (KOR) 2011	Graceful Ballerina (USA); 2005	Royal Ballerina (USA)	Farma Way (USA)
Dam Winner's Marine (KOR) 2011	Graceful Ballerina (USA); 2005	Royal Ballerina (USA)	Leading Ballerina (USA)
