= Raon The Fighter =

Korean-bred Thoroughbred racehorse

라온더파이터 Raon The Fighter
- Sire: Bayern
- Grandsire: Offlee Wild
- Dam: Clarinda
- Damsire: Empire Maker
- Sex: Stallion
- Foaled: 21 April 2018
- Country: Korea
- Colour: Bay
- Owner: Son Cheon Soo
- Trainer: Park Jong-gon
- Record: 19: 15-4-0-0
- Earnings: 2,297,150,000 KRW

Major wins
- SROA Chairman's Sprint (2021); KRA Cup Classic (2022); Owner's Cup (2022); Busan Ilbo Cup (2023); SBS Sports Sprint (2023)

Raon The Fighter (Korean: 라온더파이터, foaled 21 April 2018) is a Korean Thoroughbred racehorse. He is regarded as one of the elite trio that defined the peak of Raon Ranch, alongside Raon First and Raon The Spurt. Notably, he maintained a perfect 100% top two finish rate while competing across all major distances in South Korean racing, ranging from sprints and miles to long distance events. Throughout his career, he was considered the primary rival to the nation's top rated horse, Winner's Man. He currently ranks eighth in all-time career earnings in the history of South Korean horse racing.

== Racing statistics ==
Raon The Fighter won 15 races out of 18 starts. This data is available in KRA and Racing Post.

Date	course	Race	Grade	Distance	Finish	Time	Winning (Losing)Margin	Jockey	Winner (Runner-up)	Ref
2020 - two-year-old season
Nov 14	Seoul	1200m	Class 6	Dirt 1,200m	1st	1:13.6	9 length	Lee Hyuk	(Park Win)	
2021 - three-year-old season
Jan 15	Seoul	1200m	Class 5	Dirt 1,200m	1st	1:13.3	7 length	Lee Hyuk	(Hong Dream)	
Mar 7	Seoul	1400m	Class 4	Dirt 1,400m	1st	1:26.9	8 length	Lee Hyuk	(Cheonji Yeogeol)	
Apr 18	Seoul	1400m	Class 4	Dirt 1,400m	1st	1:25.3	10 length	Lee Hyuk	(Rapido Ares)	
Jun 6	Seoul	1800m	Class 3	Dirt 1,800m	1st	1:56.9	8 length	Lee Hyuk	(Simon Queen)	
Jul 17	Seoul	1400m	Class 2	Dirt 1,400m	1st	1:24.7	4 length	Lee Hyuk	(Echo Bill)	
Sep 18	Seoul	Retired racehorse commemorative race	Class 2	Dirt 1,400m	1st	1:24.7	8 length	Lee Hyuk	(Good Pilseung)	
Nov 20	Seoul	SROA Chairman's Sprint	GIII	Dirt 1,200m	1st	1:10.5	6 length	Park Taejong	(Eoma Eoma)	
2022 - four-year-old season
Jan 9	Seoul	1400m	Class 1	Dirt 1,400m	1st	1:25.0	6 length	Lee Hyuk	(Legend Day)	
Feb 20	Seoul	1200m	Class 1	Dirt 1,200m	1st	1:11.8	8 length	Lee Hyuk	(Dixie Again)	
Apr 24	Busan	Busan Ilbo Cup	GIII	Dirt 1,200m	2nd	1:11.6	(3 length)	Lee Hyuk	Eoma Eoma	
May 23	Seoul	SROA Chairman's Sprint	GIII	Dirt 1,200m	2nd	1:12.5	(Nose)	Lee Hyuk	Black Musk	
Jul 24	Busan	Owner's Cup	GIII	Dirt 1,600m	1st	1:36.9	4 length	Moon Seyoung	(SimJangui Godong, King of the Match)	
Sep 4	Seoul	Korea Cup	GI	Dirt 1,800m	2nd	1:53.3	(1 length)	Moon Seyoung	Winner's Man	
Oct 16	Seoul	KRA Cup Classic	GII	Dirt 2,000m	1st	2:06.4	5 length	Moon Seyoung	(King of the Match)	
Dec 11	Seoul	Grand Prix	GI	Dirt 2,300m	2nd	2:26.4	(1 length)	Moon Seyoung	Winner's Man	
2023 - five year-old season
Feb 19	Seoul	1800m	Class 1	Dirt 1,800m	1st	1:53.2	10 length	Im Giwon	(The Gumpu)	
Apr 2	Busan	Busan Ilbo Cup	GIII	Dirt 1,200m	1st	1:11.3	5 length	Im Giwon	(Beolmaui Star)	
May 14	Seoul	SBS Sports Sprint	GIII	Dirt 1,200m	1st	R1:10.6	2½ length	Im Giwon	(Eoma Eoma)	

- R in the chart and the time written in red indicates the horse finished in record time.

== Pedigree ==
Pedigree of Raon The Fighter (KOR), Bay Stallion, 2018
Sire Bayern (USA) 2011	Offlee Wild (USA); 2000	Wild Again (USA)	Icecapade (USA)
Sire Bayern (USA) 2011	Offlee Wild (USA); 2000	Wild Again (USA)	Bushel-n-peck (USA)
Sire Bayern (USA) 2011	Offlee Wild (USA); 2000	Alvear (USA)	Seattle Slew (USA)
Sire Bayern (USA) 2011	Offlee Wild (USA); 2000	Alvear (USA)	Andover Way (USA)
Sire Bayern (USA) 2011	Alittlebitearly (USA); 2002	Thunder Gulch (USA)	Gulch (USA)
Sire Bayern (USA) 2011	Alittlebitearly (USA); 2002	Thunder Gulch (USA)	Line Of Thunder (USA)
Sire Bayern (USA) 2011	Alittlebitearly (USA); 2002	Aquilegia (USA)	Alydar (USA)
Sire Bayern (USA) 2011	Alittlebitearly (USA); 2002	Aquilegia (USA)	Courtly Dee (USA)
Dam Clarinda (USA) 2009	Empire Maker (USA); 2000	Unbridled (USA)	Fappiano (USA)
Dam Clarinda (USA) 2009	Empire Maker (USA); 2000	Unbridled (USA)	Gana Facil (USA)
Dam Clarinda (USA) 2009	Empire Maker (USA); 2000	Toussaud (USA)	El Gran Senor (USA)
Dam Clarinda (USA) 2009	Empire Maker (USA); 2000	Toussaud (USA)	Image Of Reality (USA)
Dam Clarinda (USA) 2009	Miss Mary Apples (USA); 2000	Clever Trick (USA)	Icecapade (USA)
Dam Clarinda (USA) 2009	Miss Mary Apples (USA); 2000	Clever Trick (USA)	Kankakee Miss (USA)
Dam Clarinda (USA) 2009	Miss Mary Apples (USA); 2000	Sacred Sue (USA)	Holy Bull (USA)
Dam Clarinda (USA) 2009	Miss Mary Apples (USA); 2000	Sacred Sue (USA)	Bootshine Girl (USA)
