= Korea Cup (horse racing) =

Flat G2 horse race in Korea

- Previous: 2026 OBS Korea Cup; September 6, 2026; Next: 2027 OBS Korea Cup; TBA
- Diktaean in the 2026 Korea Cup
- Class: Domestic GI • International GII
- Location: LetsRun Park Seoul; Gwacheon, Gyeonggi Province, South Korea
- Inaugurated: September 11, 2016 (10 years ago)
- Race type: Thoroughbred
- Sponsor: OBS
- Website: https://koreacup.kr

Race information
- Distance: 1800 meters (about 9 furlongs / 1 1/10 miles)
- Record: London Town, 1:50.6
- Surface: Dirt
- Track: Left-handed
- Qualification: 3-year-olds & up, Thoroughbreds (safety factor: 16 horses; up to four foreign-trained starters are allowed in the race)
- Weight: 3-year-old 55 kg / 4-year-old & up 57 kg Allowances: 2 kg for fillies and mares; 2 kg for S. Hemisphere 3-year-olds; 0.5 kg for S. Hemisphere 4-year-old & up
- Purse: ₩ 1,600,000,000 (as of 2025); 1st: ₩ 800,000,000; 2nd: ₩ 320,000,000; 3rd ₩ 160,000,000

The Korea Cup (KG1; Korean: 코리아컵) is a group 2 horse race in South Korea held annually in September at LetsRun Park Seoul in Gwacheon, Gyeonggi Province. It is a flat race run over a distance of 1,800 metres (1.1 mi) with a maximum of 16 horses.

First run in 2016, the Korea Cup was created by the Korea Racing Authority (KRA) in order to strengthen the international economic power of Korean horse racing and promote exchanges with world-class horse racing countries. It is often one of the most attended races of the year hosted by the KRA, regularly reaching 30,000 people in attendance. Along with the Korea Sprint, it is also the only international grade race hosted in Korea.

While this race is the youngest among Korea's graded stakes, it carries significant weight. Inaugurated to prove Korea's readiness for international competition, it boasts the nation's highest purse of roughly 1.6 billion KRW (approx. 1,100,000 USD / 190 million JPY) to attract top contenders and validate its status. In 2019, the race was temporarily converted to a domestic event due to the Japan–South Korea trade dispute, and in 2020 and 2021, it was cancelled due to the COVID-19 outbreak in the country. It was upgraded to an international Grade 3 race in 2022 along with the Korea Sprint, and was designated as a "Win and You're In" challenge race for the Breeders' Cup Dirt Mile in 2024. In 2026, it was promoted to an international G2 race.

== Course ==
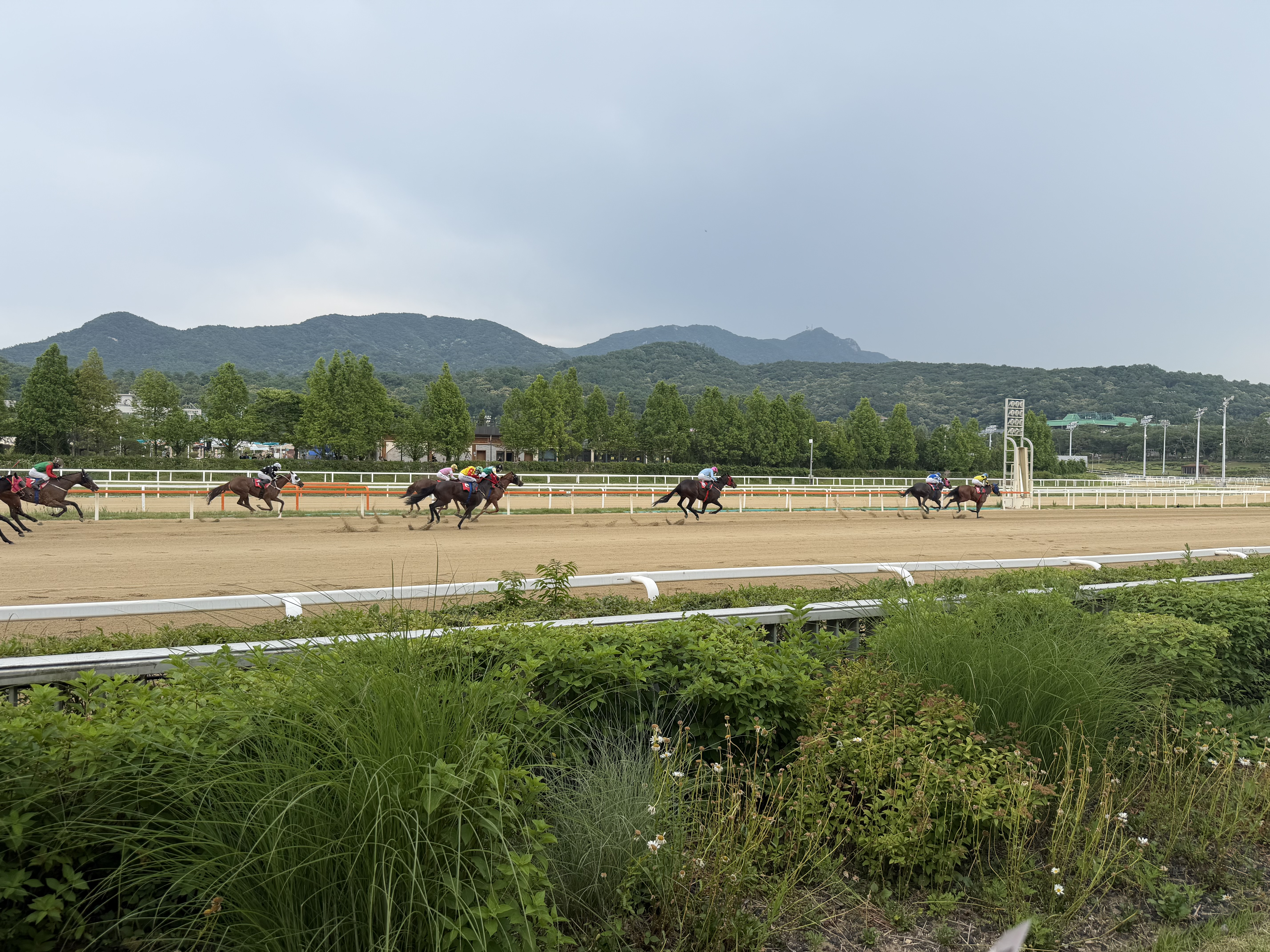
Seoul Racecourse

The Korea Cup is held at the LetsRun Park Seoul (known also as Seoul Racecourse), situated in the southern Seoul suburb of Gwacheon. At 1,800 metres long, the race is run counter-clockwise around the Racecourse's oval dirt track.

Resembling a velodrome, the track features a straight finish line and an uphill section with a 2m elevation gain from the 4th corner. The curves are banked at about 1.5m. The track is 30m wide in front of the observation deck and 25m elsewhere. The surface consists of a 7 cm layer of sand, sitting atop a base composed of decomposed granite and gravel, each about 30 cm thick. The sand track is deep.

== Race history ==
=== Early stage ===
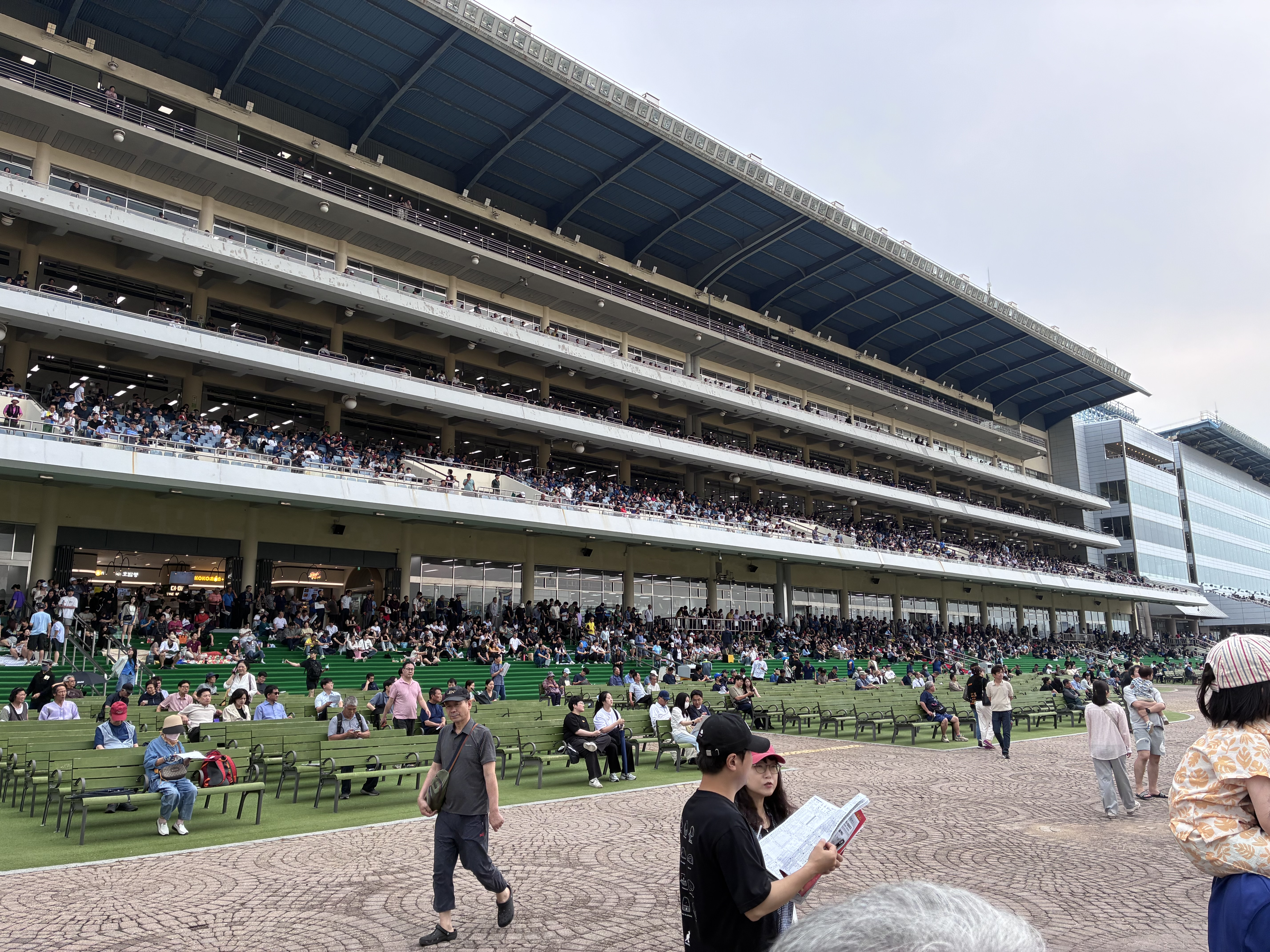
The appearance of a Korean racecourse

Historically in South Korea, horse racing was predominantly perceived as a form of gambling rather than a legitimate sport. Although the Korea Racing Authority (KRA) made continuous efforts to shift this public perception, progress was long hindered by outdated institutional frameworks and a lack of international competitiveness.

The establishment of the Korea Cup was a part of internationalization efforts pursued by the Korea Racing Authority and was included in the "Horse Racing Innovation Measures" announced in 2007. The goal at the time was to host international races by 2015–2016 as part of a three-stage plan, and the Korea Cup and the Korea Sprint were the results of this initiative. There were no international grade races in Korea until the Korea Cup and Korea Sprint were established in 2016.

In July 2016, two months prior to the inaugural race, South Korea was officially elevated to Part II status following approval from the International Federation of Horseracing Authorities (IFHA).

The first Korea Cup was held in 2016. The final international lineup was confirmed to include Japanese contenders such as the Japan Dirt Derby winner Chrysolite and Kurino Star O. In Korea, attention focused on the President's Cup winner Triple Nine and the 2016 Triple Crown achiever Power Blade. In the race, Japanese entrant Chrysolite, ridden by Kanichiro Fujii, secured a decisive victory, crossing the finish line six lengths clear of Kurino Star O. Triple Nine, the top domestic hope, finished third 16 lengths behind the winner and 10 lengths behind the runner up. With Power Blade finishing fourth, the wide margins demonstrated a clear disparity in class between the Japanese and South Korean fields. While a Japanese victory was largely anticipated, the significant gap in performance highlighted the current standing of South Korean horse racing and left a profound impact on the Korea Racing Authority and local fans.

The second Korea Cup took place on September 10, 2017. The international field featured the defending champion Chrysolite and London Town from Japan. In Korea, significant attention was once again centered on Triple Nine, who had earlier that year returned after becoming the first South Korean-trained horse to compete in an international Group 1 race, the Al Maktoum Challenge.

Ultimately, the victory went to Japan once again. Ridden by jockey Yasunari Iwata, London Town secured a commanding win, finishing a full 22 lengths ahead of the top South Korean contender. The inaugural Korea Cup winner, Chrysolite, finished second—four lengths behind London Town and a massive 17 lengths clear of the third-place American entrant, Papa Shot. The best-performing domestic horse was Triple Nine, who finished fourth, just one length behind Papa Shot.

It was later revealed that Chrysolite had sustained an injury during the race. The fact that an injured horse could secure second place and finish so far ahead of the best South Korean contenders served to further underscore the stark disparity in class between Japanese and South Korean horse racing.

The third Korea Cup was held on September 9, 2018. Following a change in regulations for this running, the international invitational quota was restricted to one horse per country. The international field included Japan's defending champion London Town, who was seeking a second consecutive title, and Ireland's Forest Ranger, winner of the 2018 Huxley Stakes.

In South Korea, the primary focus was on Cheongdam Dokki. Having won the KRA Cup Classic and swept the Stayer Series Triple Crown, he was widely regarded as the strongest active racehorse in Seoul. Additionally, considerable interest was directed toward Dolkong, winner of the HKJC Trophy.

Defying pre race expert predictions that his form had declined from the previous year, London Town successfully defended his title. Rounding the final turn, London Town accelerated to open a lead of approximately five lengths. While Cheongdam Dokki and Dolkong attempted to give chase, they were unable to close the gap. At the finish, London Town secured his second consecutive victory, finishing a full 15 lengths ahead of runner up Dolkong. Third place went to the 2016 Grand Prix winner Clean Up Joy, who finished about two lengths ahead of fourth-place Cheongdam Dokki. Ireland's Forest Ranger rounded out the top five.

In a post race interview, Yasunari Iwata remarked "I saw Cheongdam Dokki take the lead, but I was unconcerned and maintained my own pace. As that horse eventually faded, London Town was able to run comfortably and secure the win."

In July 2019, two months prior to the fourth Korea Cup, the International Federation of Horseracing Authorities (IFHA) decided to elevate the race to Part I International G3 race. As this promotion would mark the first time in the century long history of South Korean horse racing that a domestic stakes race achieved international graded status, it drew significant anticipation from local racing fans.

On August 9, 2019, amid the Japan–South Korea trade dispute and prevailing anti-Japanese sentiment, the Korea Racing Authority (KRA) announced that it would not invite Japanese horses to the competition. The KRA cited the need to prevent potential incidents and avoid negative public backlash as the rationale for this exclusion.

However, this political motivated decision sparked widespread controversy and drew heavy criticism toward the KRA. Consequently, the International Federation of Horseracing Authorities (IFHA) determined that restricting entries based on nationality violated its regulations. As a result, the IFHA revoked and suspended the Korea Cup's pending promotion to International Grade 3 race. The fourth Korea Cup proceeded as scheduled on September 8, 2019. The international field included the American entrant Lone Sailor, winner of the 2018 Oklahoma Derby, alongside Hong Kong's Glorious Artist. As a result of the Korea Racing Authority's earlier decision to withhold invitations, no Japanese horses participated in this running.

Among the South Korean contenders, significant attention centered on Dolkong, who had recently returned from becoming the first South Korean-trained horse to compete in the Dubai World Cup. Other leading domestic entrants included Moonhak Chief, winner of the YTN Cup, and Cheongdam Dokki, who was returning for another attempt at the title.

In the race, Moonhak Chief defeated Cheongdam Dokki by approximately two lengths to secure South Korea's first victory in the Korea Cup. Pre race favorite Dolkong finished fifth, four lengths behind Hong Kong's Glorious Artist. The American contender Lone Sailor finished tenth, trailing New Legend by two lengths after fading in the final stages.

=== Competition Canceled ===
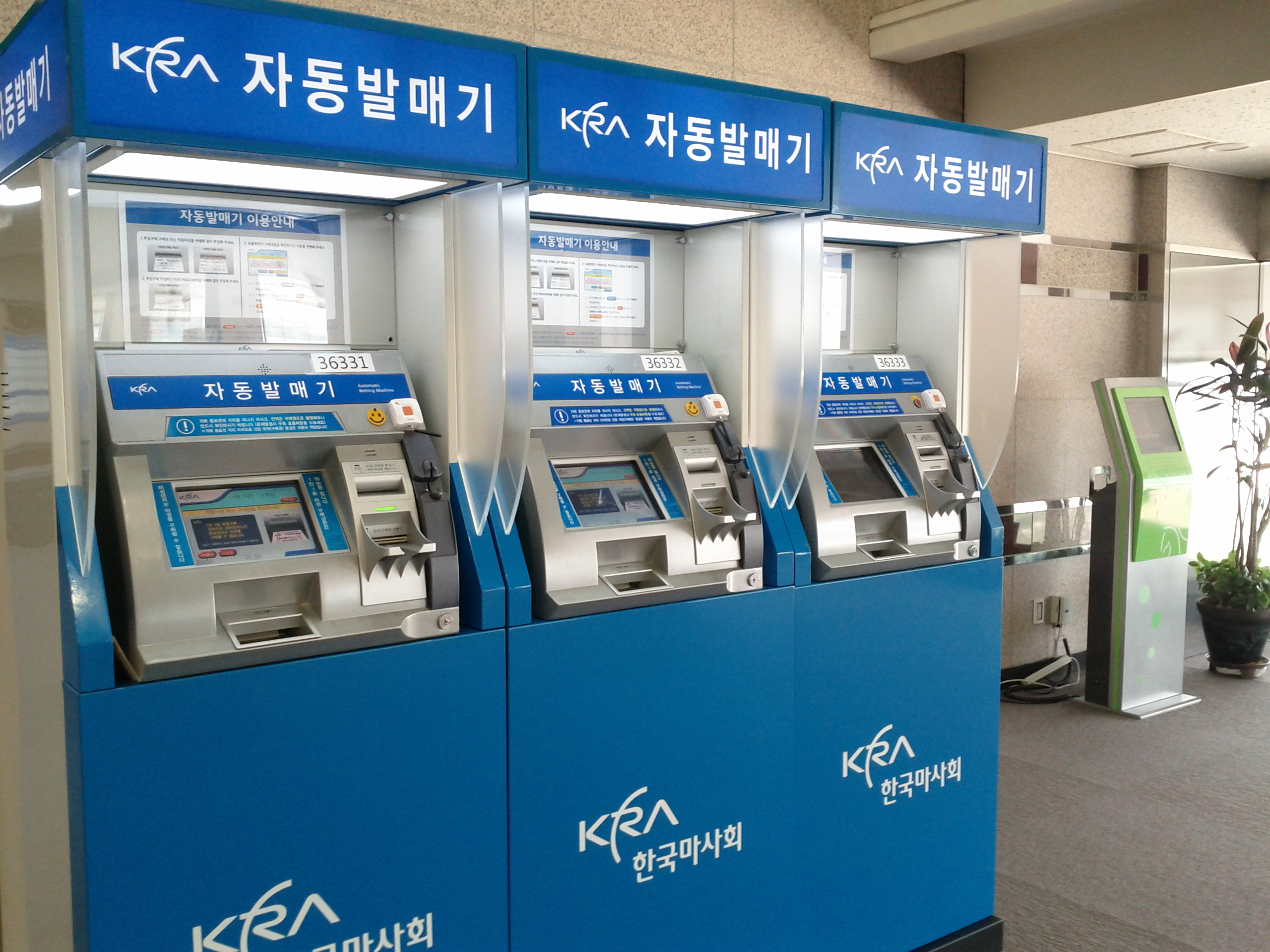
Korea Betting Terminal

In 2020 and 2021, it was cancelled due to the COVID-19 outbreak in the country. During this period, the South Korean horse racing industry was severely impacted by the COVID-19 pandemic. Compared to pre-pandemic levels, the number of races held decreased by 38%, while total prize money saw a significant decline of 60%.

=== 2020s ===
In 2022, as the COVID-19 situation in Korea eased, the KRA announced the resumption of the Korea Cup and the Korea Sprint, which had been suspended for two years. This announcement was made alongside the return of night racing and the relaxation of attendance restrictions.

On June 24, 2022, the IFHA announced the re-promotion of the Korea Cup and the Korea Sprint to International Group 3 status, following the suspension of their international ratings in 2019. This marked a historic milestone, as Korea hosted its first internationally graded races exactly 100 years after the nation's inaugural horse race was held in 1922.

The international lineup for the 2022 Korea Cup included Sekifu, the winner of the 2021 Hyogo Junior Grand Prix and runner-up in the 2022 Saudi Derby. It was also announced that jockey Kota Fujioka would take the mount.

Among the domestic contenders, the primary focus was on Winner's Man and Raon The Fighter. Winner's Man, the 2021 Korean Derby winner, had swept the 2022 Stayer Series and entered the race undefeated in his four-year-old season. Meanwhile, Raon The Fighter, the 2021 SROA Chairman's Sprint winner, had maintained a 100% Top-two finish rate in all 13 of his previous starts, establishing him as the leading horse in Seoul. As the recognized top racehorses from the Busan-Gyeongnam and Seoul respectively, their second head-to-head matchup drew significant public interest.

Additionally, Dolkong received modest attention as he made his return to racing following three years of rehabilitation from a fractured sesamoid bone.

At the start of the race, Raon The Fighter took the early lead and set the pace. Sekifu maintained second place, closely tracking the leader, while Winner's Man settled into a stalking position. Entering the final turn, Winner's Man advanced to fourth. At the top of the final straight, Raon The Fighter and Sekifu engaged in a two-length battle, though Sekifu was unable to overtake the leader. As Raon The Fighter maintained his advantage, Winner's Man accelerated, passing Sekifu at the 50-meter mark. Delivering a finish, Winner's Man then overtook Raon The Fighter just before the finish line to win the Korea Cup. Raon The Fighter finished second by a margin of one length, with Japan's Sekifu finishing third, an additional length behind. Dolkong making his first Korea Cup appearance in three years, finished in 11th place.

With this victory, Winner's Man became the first Korean-bred horse to win the Korea Cup and the first local horse to win the event in a year featuring Japanese contenders. He was also the first Korean-bred horse to win an internationally graded race. Fueled by the popularity of the Uma Musume Pretty Derby franchise in South Korea, fans gave him the nickname "Captain General of all Korea" in reference to the Japanese racehorse Special Week. This moniker gained such widespread popularity that it was eventually adopted by the Korea Racing Authority (KRA) for official promotional purposes.

In 2023, the international lineup for the Korea Cup strengthened following the race's promotion to an international Grade 3 status and a purse increase. The international contenders included 2022 UAE Derby winner Crown Pride, 2023 Diolite Kinen winner Gloria Mundi, and Hong Kong's Apache Pass. Meisho Hario was initially scheduled to enter but was ultimately withdrawn from the race, delaying a potential rematch for Crown Pride, who had previously finished behind Meisho Hario in the 2022 Teio Sho. Among the domestic contenders, defending champion Winner's Man and 2023 Korean Triple Crown two-leg winner Global Hit.

In the race, Crown Pride secured the victory, finishing approximately 10 lengths ahead of Gloria Mundi. Defending champion Winner's Man took third place, finishing about five lengths behind Gloria Mundi, while Global Hit finished in eighth place.

In 2024, the international lineup featured Kawasaki Kinen winner Light Warrior, Japan Breeding Farms' Cup Classic winner Wilson Tesoro, and defending champion Crown Pride. The Korean contenders included Global Hit and Winner's Man. In the race, Crown Pride successfully defended his title, finishing five lengths ahead of Wilson Tesoro to secure back-to-back victories. Winner's Man finished in last place in what was the final start of his career before retirement.

In 2025, the seven-year-old Diktaean secured the victory, defeating Tokyo Derby winner Ramjet and Hopeful Stakes winner Dura Erede. With this win, Diktaean became the second NAR-registered horse from Japan to win a race in Korea, following Tosen Archer in 2013. (SBS ESPN Hai) In the same race, Korean representative Speed Young finished fourth, placing approximately four lengths ahead of fifth-place Dura Erede. This marked the first time a Korean horse finished ahead of a International G1 winner horse.

Furthermore, this edition fulfilled the performance criteria required for promotion to international Grade 2 status, and the Korea Cup was officially promoted to Grade 2 race in 2026.

Diktaean in the 2026 Korea Cup

In 2026, Korean prospect Clean One, who had won the 2025 Grand Prix wire-to-wire, engaged in an intense early duel for the lead with Japan's Sunday Funday. After pressing a fast early pace, Clean One faded in the final straight to finish fifth, while Sunday Funday, Under pressure from Clean One, finished second. Capitalizing on the duel with a late-closing strategy, Diktaean secured his second consecutive Korea Cup victory. Among the domestic entries, Amazing Khan achieved the highest finish, placing third, 11 lengths behind the runner-up.

Subsequent to the race, Clean One was retired from racing due to the fracture sustained in this Korea Cup, following the significant physical strain incurred during the fierce duel with the Japanese entrant.

== Records ==
Leading horse:

- 2 - London Town (2017, 2018)
- 2 - Crown Pride (2023, 2024)
- 2 - Diktaean (2025, 2026)

Leading Jockey:

- 2 - Yasunari Iwata: London Town (2017, 2018)
- 2 - Takayuki Yano: Diktaean (2025, 2026)

- Fastest winning time: London Town (2018): 1:50.6
- Slowest winning time: Moonhak Chief (2019): 1:53.3
- Largest margin of victory: 15 lengths - London Town (2018)
- Shortest margin of victory: 1 lengths - Winner's Man (2022). Diktaean (2025)
- Oldest winning horse: Diktaean (2026); aged 8
- Youngest winning horse: London Town (2017), Moonhak Chief (2019), Winner's Man (2022), Crown Pride (2023); all aged 3

== Winner ==
Winners of the Korea Cup
Year	Winner	Age	Time	Jockey	owner	Top 5 Purse	Competition Rating	Reference
2016	Chrysolite (JPN)	6	1:52.3	Kanichiro Fujii (JPN)	Hidetaka Otonashi (JPN)	₩900,000,000	(Domestic racing)	
2017	London Town (JPN)	4	1:50.7	Yasunari Iwata (JPN)	Makita Kazuya (JPN)	₩900,000,000	104.75	
2018	London Town (JPN)	5	1:50.6	Yasunari Iwata (JPN)	Makita Kazuya (JPN)	₩900,000,000	104	
2019	Moonhak Chief (KOR)	4	1:53.3	Moon Se-young (KOR)	Kim Sun-geun (KOR)	₩900,000,000	104.25	
International GIII Promotion (2022)
2022	Winner's Man (KOR)	4	1:53.1	Seo Seung-yoon (KOR)	Lee kyung-hee (KOR)	₩900,000,000	109.5	
2023	Crown Pride (JPN)	4	1:51.5	Yuga Kawada (JPN)	Koichi Shintani (JPN)	₩1,404,000,000	112	
2024	Crown Pride (JPN)	5	1:51.8	Takeshi Yokoyama (JPN)	Koichi Shintani (JPN)	₩1,404,000,000	114	
2025	Diktaean (JPN)	7	1:50.8	Takayuki Yano (JPN)	Katsunori Ariyama (JPN)	₩1,404,000,000	114.5	
International GII Promotion (2026)
2026	Diktaean (JPN)	8	1:51.7	Takayuki Yano (JPN)	Katsunori Ariyama (JPN)	₩1,440,000,000	114.5	

== See also ==
- Korea Racing Authority
- Korea Sprint
- Horse racing in South Korea
- Korean Derby
