= Global Hit =

South Korean-bred racehorse (born 2020)

글로벌히트 Global Hit
- Sire: To Honor and Serve
- Grandsire: Bernardini
- Dam: Tammy's Victress
- Damsire: Yankee Victor
- Sex: Stallion
- Foaled: 26 February 2020
- Country: Korea
- Colour: Bay
- Owner: Kim Junhyeon
- Trainer: Bang dong-seok
- Jockey: Kim Hyeseon
- Record: 25: 12-5-2-6
- Earnings: 4,695,250,000 KRW

Major wins
- Korean Derby (2021); President's Cup (2024); Grand Prix (2024)

Awards
- Korean Horse of the Year (2024); Korea Best Domestic Horse (2024)

Global Hit (Korean: 글로벌히트, foaled 26 February 2020) is a South Korean Thoroughbred racehorse. His major career victories include the 2023 Korean Derby, followed by wins in the President's Cup and the Grand Prix in 2024. In recognition of these achievements, he was named the 2024 KRA Horse of the Year and Best Domestic-bred Horse, while also securing the title of Champion of the Stayer Series.

== Racing statistics ==
Global Hit won 18 races out of 29 starts. This data is available in KRA and Racing Post.

| Date | course | Race | Grade | Distance | Finish | Time | Winning (Losing)Margin | Jockey | Winner (Runner-up) | Ref |
|---|---|---|---|---|---|---|---|---|---|---|
2022 - two-year-old season
| Jun 24 | Busan | 1000m | Class 6 | Dirt 1,000m | 1st | 1:00.8 | ½ length | Yoo Hyeon-myeong | (Doctor Oscar) | |
| Jul 29 | Busan | 1200m | Class 5 | Dirt 1,200m | 9th | 1:16.8 | (1 length) | Yoo Hyeon-myeong | Pyounghwa chukje | |
2023 - three-year-old season
| Jan 13 | Busan | 1200m | Class 5 | Dirt 1,200m | 1st | 1:13.1 | ½ length | Kim Hyeseon | (World Flower) | |
| Mar 19 | Busan | Gyeongnam Newspaper Cup | L | Dirt 1,400m | 8th | 1:28.8 | 1¾ length | Park Jay | Betelgeuse | |
| May 5 | Busan | 1400m | Class 4 | Dirt 1,400m | 1st | 1:24.2 | 12 length | Kim Hyeseon | (Suden King) | |
| Jun 11 | Seoul | Korea Derby | GI | Dirt 1,800m | 1st | 1:53.4 | 3 length | Kim Hyeseon | (Naol Sniper) | |
| Jul 22 | Seoul | Minister's Cup | GII | Dirt 2,000m | 1st | 2:09.0 | 3 length | Kim Hyeseon | (Speed Young) | |
| Sep 10 | Seoul | Korea Cup | GI | Dirt 1,800m | 8th | 1:54.9 | (Head) | Kim Hyeseon | Crown Pride | |
| Nov 19 | Seoul | President's Cup | GI | Dirt 2,000m | 2nd | 2:06.3 | (7 length) | Kim Hyeseon | Winner's Man | |
| Dec 17 | Seoul | Grand Prix | GI | Dirt 2,300m | 2nd | 2:24.8 | (Nose) | Kim Hyeseon | Winner's Man | |
2024 - four-year-old season
| Mar 17 | Seoul | Korea Herald Cup | GIII | Dirt 2,000m | 1st | 2:08.5 | ¾ length | Kim Hyeseon | (Nut play) | |
| Apr 21 | Seoul | YTN Cup | GIII | Dirt 2,000m | 1st | 2:05.8 | Nose | Kim Hyeseon | (Tuhonui Banseok) | |
| May 26 | Busan | Busan Metropolitan Mayor’s cup | GII | Dirt 1,800m | 2nd | 1:52.8 | (¼ length) | Kim Hyeseon | (uhonui Banseok | |
| Aug 4 | Seoul | KRA Cup Classic | GII | Dirt 2,000m | 1st | 2:06.2 | 1 length | Kim Hyeseon | (Tuhonui Banseok) | |
| Sep 8 | Seoul | Korea Cup | GI | Dirt 1,800m | 3rd | 1:53.5 | (5 length) | Kim Hyeseon | Crown Pride | |
| Oct 13 | Seoul | President's Cup | GI | Dirt 2,000m | 1st | 2:05.9 | 5 length | Kim Hyeseon | (Naol Sniper) | |
| Dec 1 | Seoul | Grand Prix | GI | Dirt 2,300m | 1st | 2:26.0 | 1¾ length | Kim Hyeseon | (Tuhonui Banseok) | |
2025 - five-year-old season
| Jan 25 | Meydan | Al Maktoum Challenge | GI | Dirt 1,900m | 8th | 1:58.0 | (2 length) | Kim Hyeseon | Walk Of Stars | |
| Mar 1 | Meydan | Al Maktoum Classic | GII | Dirt 2,000m | 3rd | 2:01.3 | (Head) | Kim Hyeseon | Imperial Emperor | |
| Apr 20 | Seoul | YTN Cup | GIII | Dirt 2,000m | 1st | 2:06.7 | 5½ length | Kim Hyeseon | (Speed Young) | |
| May 25 | Busan | Busan Metropolitan Mayor's cup | GII | Dirt 1,800m | 1st | 1:53.5 | ¼ length | Kim Hyeseon | (Speed Young) | |
| Aug 3 | Seoul | KRA Cup Classic | GII | Dirt 2,000m | 2nd | 2:08.8 | (4 length) | Kim Hyeseon | Success Baekpa | |
| Oct 19 | Seoul | President's Cup | GI | Dirt 2,000m | 4th | 2:07.9 | (¾ length) | Kim Hyeseon | Speed Young | |
| Nov 30 | Seoul | Grand Prix | GI | Dirt 2,300m | 7th | 2:29.9 | (1½ length) | Seo Seung-woon | Clean One | |
2026 - six-year-old season
| Feb 15 | Busan | 2000m | Class 1 | Dirt 2,000m | 2nd | 2:08.8 | (Nose) | Seo Seung-woon | Yeonggawng-ui First | |

== Pedigree ==
Pedigree of Global Hit (KOR), bay Stallion, 2020
| Sire To Honor and Serve (USA) 2008 | Bernardini (USA); 2003 | A.P. Indy (USA) | Seattle Slew (USA) |
| Sire To Honor and Serve (USA) 2008 | Bernardini (USA); 2003 | A.P. Indy (USA) | Weekend Surprise (USA) |
| Sire To Honor and Serve (USA) 2008 | Bernardini (USA); 2003 | Cara Rafaela (USA) | Quiet American (USA) |
| Sire To Honor and Serve (USA) 2008 | Bernardini (USA); 2003 | Cara Rafaela (USA) | Oil Fable (USA) |
| Sire To Honor and Serve (USA) 2008 | Pilfer (USA); 2001 | Deputy Minister (CAN) | Vice Regent (CAN) |
| Sire To Honor and Serve (USA) 2008 | Pilfer (USA); 2001 | Deputy Minister (CAN) | Mint Copy (CAN) |
| Sire To Honor and Serve (USA) 2008 | Pilfer (USA); 2001 | Misty Hour (USA) | Miswaki (USA) |
| Sire To Honor and Serve (USA) 2008 | Pilfer (USA); 2001 | Misty Hour (USA) | Our Tina Marie (USA) |
| Dam Tammy's Victress (USA) 2004 | Yankee Victor (USA); 1996 | Saint Ballado (CAN) | Halo (USA) |
| Dam Tammy's Victress (USA) 2004 | Yankee Victor (USA); 1996 | Saint Ballado (CAN) | Ballade (USA) |
| Dam Tammy's Victress (USA) 2004 | Yankee Victor (USA); 1996 | Highest Carol (USA) | Caro (IRE) |
| Dam Tammy's Victress (USA) 2004 | Yankee Victor (USA); 1996 | Highest Carol (USA) | Tokyo Princess (USA) |
| Dam Tammy's Victress (USA) 2004 | Extra Rare (USA); 1997 | Rare Brick (USA) | Rare Performer (USA) |
| Dam Tammy's Victress (USA) 2004 | Extra Rare (USA); 1997 | Rare Brick (USA) | Windy Brick (USA) |
| Dam Tammy's Victress (USA) 2004 | Extra Rare (USA); 1997 | Extra Dry (USA) | Sportin' Life (USA) |
| Dam Tammy's Victress (USA) 2004 | Extra Rare (USA); 1997 | Extra Dry (USA) | Gallamar (USA) |
