= Ramjet (horse) =

Japanese Thoroughbred racehorse (foaled 2021)

Ramjet ラムジェット
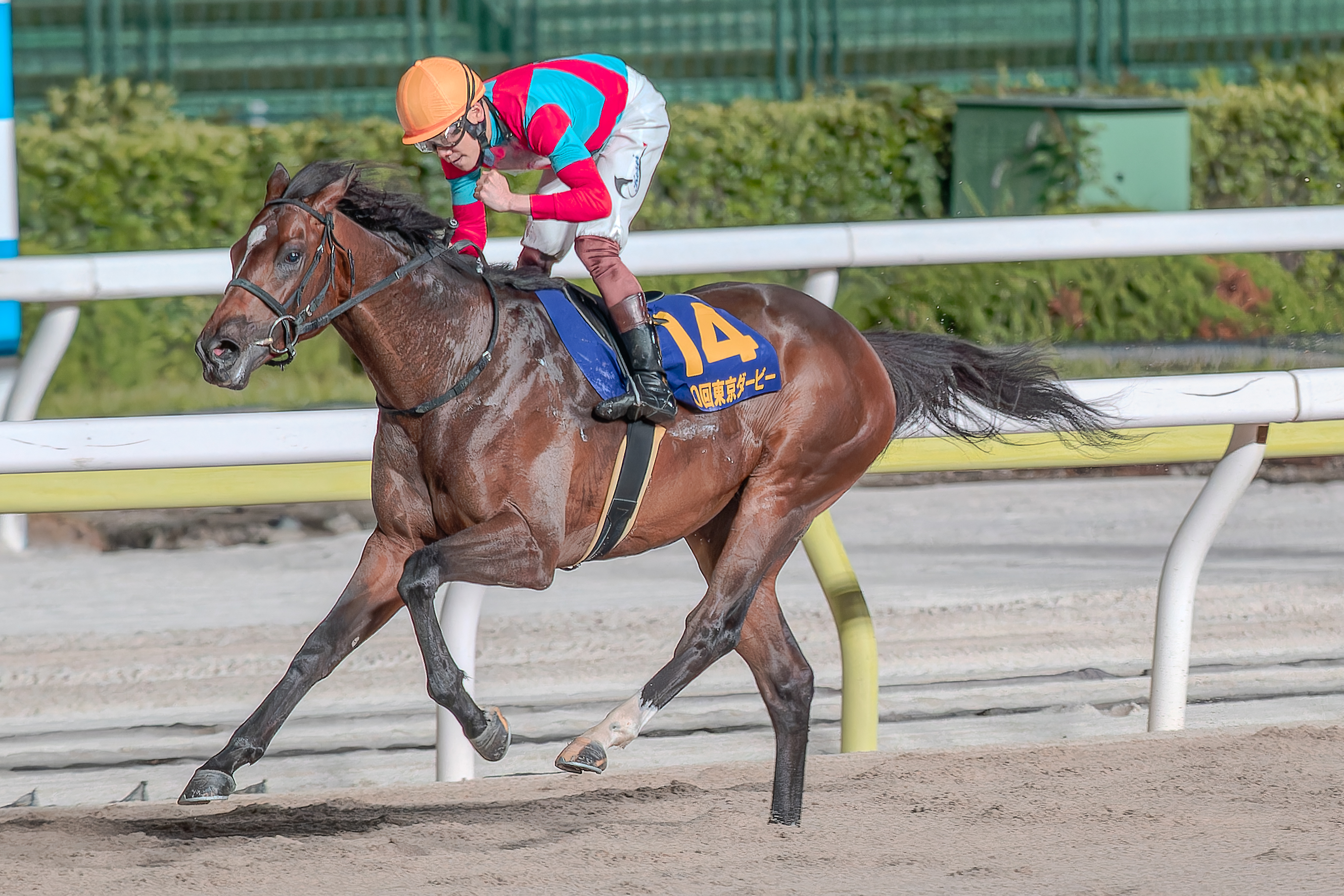
- Ramjet winning the 2024 Tokyo Derby
- Breed: Thoroughbred
- Sire: Majestic Warrior
- Grandsire: A.P. Indy
- Dam: Nefertiti
- Damsire: Gold Allure
- Sex: Colt
- Foaled: 4 April 2021
- Country: Japan
- Colour: Dark bay
- Breeder: North Hills
- Owner: Koji Maeda
- Racing colours
- Trainer: Shozo Sasaki → Mikio Matsunaga
- Jockey: Kosei Miura
- Record: 19: 5-0-3 (11 JRA: 4-0-1; 5 NAR: 1-0-2; 3 overseas: 0-0-0)
- Earnings: ¥356,378,300

Major wins
- Tokyo Derby (2024); Unicorn Stakes (2024); Hyacinth Stakes (2024)

Ramjet (Japanese: ラムジェット, Hepburn: Ramujetto; foaled 4 April 2021) is a Japanese Thoroughbred racehorse. He has competed since 2023, recording five wins in seventeen starts, including the Tokyo Derby (JpnI) and Unicorn Stakes (GIII) in 2024. His racing name is derived from the ramjet, a type of jet engine.

== Background ==
Ramjet is a dark bay colt bred in Niikappu, Hokkaido, by North Hills. He was sired by Majestic Warrior, an American-bred son of A.P. Indy, and his dam was Nefertiti, a daughter of Gold Allure. His granddam Laverita won seven graded stakes, including the 2009 Kanto Oaks. He was owned by Koji Maeda and sent into training with Shozo Sasaki at the JRA's Ritto Training Center. In March 2026, he was transferred to the stable of Mikio Matsunaga following Sasaki's retirement.

== Racing career ==
=== 2023: two-year-old season ===
Ramjet debuted on July 1, 2023, in a maiden race on the dirt at Chukyo Racecourse, ridden by Hiroshi Kitamura, winning by 0.2 seconds. He finished third in the Yamaboshi Sho (Allowance) at Hanshin Racecourse in September and ninth in the Oxalis Sho (Allowance) at Tokyo Racecourse in November. He won the Kantsubaki Sho (Allowance) at Chukyo in December, ridden by Kosei Miura.

=== 2024: three-year-old season ===
On February 18, Ramjet won the Hyacinth Stakes (Listed) at Tokyo by three lengths. On April 27, he won the Unicorn Stakes (GIII) at Kyoto Racecourse by 2.5 lengths, recording his first graded stakes victory.

On June 5, he contested the Tokyo Derby (JpnI) at Oi Racecourse. Ridden by Kosei Miura, he was positioned in third place behind the leaders before finishing strongly to win by six lengths over Satono Epic. He finished fourth in the Japan Dirt Classic (JpnI) at Oi in October and third in the Tokyo Daishoten (GI) at Oi in December.

=== 2025: four-year-old season ===
Ramjet finished sixth in the Saudi Cup (G1) at King Abdulaziz Racetrack in February and ninth in the Dubai World Cup (G1) at Meydan Racecourse in March. He finished sixth in the Teio Sho (JpnI) at Oi in July and third in the Korea Cup (G3) at Seoul Racecourse in September. He finished fourth in the Miyako Stakes (GIII) at Kyoto in November and third in the Champions Cup (GI) at Chukyo in December.

=== 2026: five-year-old season ===
Ramjet finished eighth in the February Stakes (GI) at Tokyo in February and fifth in the Teio Sho (JpnI) at Oi in July. He resumed his season at the Sirius Stakes in the last week of September, in which he finished seventh on the day. He ran again two months later at the Miyako Stakes in which he finished in 12th, his first double digit finish in his career.

== Statistics ==
The following table details all 19 starts of Ramjet's racing career based on official netkeiba, JBIS, and Racing Post records. Record current as of 8 November 2026.

| Date | Distance (Condition) | Race | Class | Course | Odds (Favourite) | Field | Finish | Time | Jockey | Winning (Losing) Margin | Winner (2nd Place) | Ref |
|---|---|---|---|---|---|---|---|---|---|---|---|---|
2023 – two-year-old season
| Jul 1 | Dirt 1400 m (Sloppy) | 2-Y-O Newcomer | Maiden | Chukyo | 14.4 (6th) | 10 | 1st | 1:25.4 | Hiroshi Kitamura | –0.2 | (Neuer Held) | |
| Sep 30 | Dirt 1400 m (Fast) | Yamaboshi Sho | Allowance | Hanshin | 2.5 (1st) | 9 | 3rd | 1:25.8 | Yuga Kawada | 0.0 | Satono Phoenix | |
| Nov 11 | Dirt 1400 m (Fast) | Oxalis Sho | Allowance | Tokyo | 2.4 (1st) | 16 | 9th | 1:26.1 | Joao Moreira | 1.0 | Nova Express | |
| Dec 17 | Dirt 1400 m (Good) | Kantsubaki Sho | Allowance | Chukyo | 3.9 (2nd) | 11 | 1st | 1:26.0 | Kosei Miura | –0.2 | (Saffron Hero) | |
2024 – three-year-old season
| Feb 18 | Dirt 1600 m (Fast) | Hyacinth Stakes | Listed | Tokyo | 13.9 (5th) | 11 | 1st | 1:36.3 | Kosei Miura | –0.5 | (Unquenchable) | |
| Apr 27 | Dirt 1900 m (Fast) | Unicorn Stakes | GIII | Kyoto | 7.3 (3rd) | 16 | 1st | 1:58.6 | Kosei Miura | –0.4 | (Satono Epic) | |
| Jun 5 | Dirt 2000 m (Good) | Tokyo Derby | JpnI | Oi | 1.7 (1st) | 16 | 1st | 2:06.6 | Kosei Miura | –1.2 | (Satono Epic) | |
| Oct 2 | Dirt 2000 m (Fast) | Japan Dirt Classic | JpnI | Oi | 3.6 (2nd) | 15 | 4th | 2:05.5 | Kosei Miura | 1.4 | Forever Young | |
| Dec 29 | Dirt 2000 m (Fast) | Tokyo Daishoten | GI | Oi | 9.5 (4th) | 10 | 3rd | 2:05.2 | Kosei Miura | 0.3 | Forever Young | |
2025 – four-year-old season
| Feb 22 | Dirt 1800 m (Fast) | Saudi Cup | G1 | KAA | 33.0 (8th) | 14 | 6th | 1:51.84 | Kosei Miura | 2.75 | Forever Young | |
| Apr 5 | Dirt 2000 m (Fast) | Dubai World Cup | G1 | Meydan | 33.0 (6th) | 11 | 9th | 2:05.32 | Kosei Miura | 1.82 | Hit Show | |
| Jul 2 | Dirt 2000 m (Fast) | Teio Sho | JpnI | Oi | 7.1 (3rd) | 13 | 6th | 2:04.4 | Kosei Miura | 1.3 | Mikki Fight | |
| Sep 7 | Dirt 1800 m (Firm) | Korea Cup | G3 | Seoul | 2.3 (1st) | 11 | 3rd | 1:51.4 | Kosei Miura | 0.6 | Diktaean | |
| Nov 9 | Dirt 1800 m (Sloppy) | Miyako Stakes | GIII | Kyoto | 8.4 (5th) | 15 | 4th | 1:48.0 | Kosei Miura | 0.5 | W Heart Bond | |
| Dec 7 | Dirt 1800 m (Fast) | Champions Cup | GI | Chukyo | 12.8 (7th) | 16 | 3rd | 1:50.6 | Kosei Miura | 0.4 | W Heart Bond | |
2026 – five-year-old season
| Feb 22 | Dirt 1600 m (Fast) | February Stakes | GI | Tokyo | 7.8 (4th) | 16 | 8th | 1:36.3 | Kosei Miura | 0.9 | Costa Nova | |
| Jul 1 | Dirt 2000 m (Good) | Teio Sho | JpnI | Oi | 11.5 (5th) | 13 | 5th | 2:03.6 | Kosei Miura | 0.8 | Mikki Fight | |
| Sep 26 | Dirt 2000 m (Fast) | Sirius Stakes | GIII | Hanshin | 3.6 (1st) | 16 | 7th | 2:05.7 | Kosei Miura | 0.4 | Walzer Schall | |
| Nov 8 | Dirt 1800 m (Fast) | Miyako Stakes | GIII | Kyoto | 14.4 (6th) | 16 | 12th | 1:51.5 | Kosei Miura | 1.9 | Lord Couronne | |

== Pedigree ==
Pedigree of Ramjet (JPN)
| Sire Majestic Warrior (USA) 2005 | A.P. Indy (USA); 1989 | Seattle Slew | Bold Reasoning |
| Sire Majestic Warrior (USA) 2005 | A.P. Indy (USA); 1989 | Seattle Slew | My Charmer |
| Sire Majestic Warrior (USA) 2005 | A.P. Indy (USA); 1989 | Weekend Surprise | Secretariat |
| Sire Majestic Warrior (USA) 2005 | A.P. Indy (USA); 1989 | Weekend Surprise | Lassie Dear |
| Sire Majestic Warrior (USA) 2005 | Dream Supreme (USA); 1997 | Seeking the Gold | Mr. Prospector |
| Sire Majestic Warrior (USA) 2005 | Dream Supreme (USA); 1997 | Seeking the Gold | Con Game |
| Sire Majestic Warrior (USA) 2005 | Dream Supreme (USA); 1997 | Spinning Round | Dixieland Band |
| Sire Majestic Warrior (USA) 2005 | Dream Supreme (USA); 1997 | Spinning Round | Take Heart |
| Dam Nefertiti (JPN) 2013 | Gold Allure (JPN); 1999 | Sunday Silence | Halo |
| Dam Nefertiti (JPN) 2013 | Gold Allure (JPN); 1999 | Sunday Silence | Wishing Well |
| Dam Nefertiti (JPN) 2013 | Gold Allure (JPN); 1999 | Nikiya | Nureyev |
| Dam Nefertiti (JPN) 2013 | Gold Allure (JPN); 1999 | Nikiya | Reluctant Guest |
| Dam Nefertiti (JPN) 2013 | Laverita (USA); 2006 | Unbridled's Song | Unbridled |
| Dam Nefertiti (JPN) 2013 | Laverita (USA); 2006 | Unbridled's Song | Trolley Song |
| Dam Nefertiti (JPN) 2013 | Laverita (USA); 2006 | Go Classic | Gone West |
| Dam Nefertiti (JPN) 2013 | Laverita (USA); 2006 | Go Classic | Seattle Classic |

- Ramjet is inbred 3 × 5 to Seattle Slew, 4 × 5 to Secretariat, 4 × 5 to Mr. Prospector, 5 × 5 to Buckpasser, and 5 × 5 to Northern Dancer.
- His granddam Laverita won seven graded stakes, including the 2009 Kanto Oaks.
- His fifth dam is Classy 'n Smart, a Canadian Horse Racing Hall of Fame inductee.

== See also ==
- Thoroughbred racing in Japan
- Tokyo Derby
- Unicorn Stakes
