= Korea Sprint =

G3 flat race in South Korea

- Previous: 2026 OBS Korea Sprint; September 6, 2026; Next: 2027 OBS Korea Sprint; TBA
- 2026 Korea sprint winner, Dragon Welds
- Class: Domestic GI • International GIII
- Inaugurated: September 11, 2016 (10 years ago)
- Race type: Thoroughbred
- Sponsor: OBS
- Website: koreacup.kr

Race information
- Distance: 1200 meters (about 6 furlongs / 7/10 miles)
- Record: Remake, 1:10.0
- Surface: Dirt
- Track: Left-handed
- Qualification: 3-year-olds & up, Thoroughbreds (safety factor: 16 horses; up to four foreign-trained starters are allowed in the race)
- Weight: 3-year-old 56 kg / 4-year-old & up 57 kg Allowances: 2 kg for fillies and mares; 1.5 kg for S. Hemisphere 3-year-olds
- Purse: ₩ 1,400,000,000 (as of 2025); 1st: ₩ 700,000,000; 2nd: ₩ 280,000,000; 3rd ₩ 140,000,000

The Korea Sprint (KG1; Korean: 코리아스프린트) is a group 3 horse race in South Korea held annually in September at LetsRun Park Seoul in Gwacheon, Gyeonggi Province. It is a flat race run over a distance of 1,200 metres (0.75 mi) with a maximum of 16 horses.

First run in 2016, the Korea Sprint was created by the Korea Racing Authority (KRA) in order to strengthen the international economic power of Korean horse racing and promote exchanges with world-class horse racing countries. It is often one of the most attended races of the year hosted by the KRA, regularly reaching 30,000 people in attendance. Along with the Korea Cup, it is also the only international grade race hosted in Korea. Within the domestic racing hierarchy, it holds the distinction of being the only Grade 1 sprint race held in Korea.

While this race is the youngest among Korea's graded stakes, it carries significant weight. Inaugurated to prove Korea's readiness for international competition, it boasts the nation's highest purse of roughly 1.4 billion KRW (approx. 1,000,000 USD) to attract top contenders and validate its status. In 2019, the race was temporarily converted to a domestic event due to the Japan–South Korea trade dispute, and in 2020 and 2021, it was cancelled due to the COVID-19 outbreak in the country. It was upgraded to an international Grade 3 race in 2022 along with the Korea Cup, and was designated as a "Win and You're In" challenge race for the Breeders' Cup Sprint in 2024.

== Course ==
The Korea Cup is held at the LetsRun Park Seoul (known also as Seoul Racecourse), situated in the southern Seoul suburb of Gwacheon. At 1,200 metres long, the race is ran counter-clockwise around the Racecourse's oval dirt track.

Resembling a velodrome, the track features a straight finish line and an uphill section with a 2m elevation gain from the 4th corner. The curves are banked at about 1.5m. The track is 30m wide in front of the observation deck and 25m elsewhere. The surface consists of a 7cm layer of sand, sitting atop a base composed of decomposed granite and gravel, each about 30cm thick. The sand track is deep.

== Winner ==
Year	Winner	Age	Time	Jockey	Owner	Top 5 Purse	Competition Rating	Reference
2016	Super Jockey (HKG)	8	1:11.4	Karis Teetan (MUS)	Sun-Line Thoroughbreds (HKG)	₩630,000,000	(Domestic racing)	
2017	Graceful Leap (JPN)	7	1:10.7	Yutaka Take (JPN)	Shinji Maeda (JPN)	₩630,000,000	106	
2018	Moanin (JPN)	6	1:11.5	Kanichiro Fujii (JPN)	Yukio Baba (JPN)	₩630,000,000	104	
2019	Blue Chipper (KOR)	4	1:11.1	Moon Seyoung (KOR)	Choi Byung-bu (KOR)	₩900,000,000	105.25	
International GIII Promotion (2022)
2022	Eoma Eoma (KOR)	4	1:11.2	Moon Seyoung (KOR)	Nasca (KOR)	₩900,000,000	106.75	
2023	Remake (JPN)	5	1:10.0	Yuga Kawada (JPN)	Koji Maeda (JPN)	₩1,260,000,000	111	
2024	Remake (JPN)	6	1:10.3	Yuga Kawada (JPN)	Koji Maeda (JPN)	₩1,260,000,000	109	
2025	Self Improvement (HKG)	7	1:10.6	Jerry C L Chau (HKG)	Wong Chung Mat (HKG)	₩1,260,000,000	107.3	
2026	Dragon Welds (JPN)	4	1:10.7	Keita Tosaki (JPN)	Hideaki Fujiwara (JPN)	₩1,400,000,000		

== See also ==
- Korea Racing Authority
- Korea Cup
- Horse racing in South Korea
- Korean Derby
