= Korean Derby =

G1 flat race in South Korea

- Class: Grade I
- Location: LetsRun Park Seoul; Gwacheon, Gyeonggi Province, South Korea
- Inaugurated: May 23, 1982 (44 years ago)
- Race type: Thoroughbred

Race information
- Distance: 1800 meters (about 9 furlongs / 1 1/10 miles)
- Record: Power Blade, 1:52.2
- Surface: Dirt
- Track: Left-handed
- Qualification: 3-year-olds, Thoroughbreds (safety factor: 16 horses)
- Weight: 3-year-old 57 kg Allowances: 2 kg for fillies
- Purse: ₩ 1,000,000,000 (as of 2025); 1st: ₩ 550,000,000; 2nd: ₩ 220,000,000; 3rd ₩ 140,000,000

The Korean Derby (KG1; Korean: 코리안더비) is a local Grade 1 horse race in South Korea held annually in May at LetsRun Park Seoul in Gwacheon, Gyeonggi Province. It is a flat race run over a distance of 1,800 metres (1.1 mi) with a maximum of 16 horses.

The race was established in 1982 as the Mugunghwa Cup and was renamed the Korea Derby in 1998. a title it has held to the present day. Alongside the Grand Prix, it is one of the most historic stakes races in Korea and serves as the second leg of the Korean Triple Crown.

== Past winners ==
This data is available in KRA.

Year	Winner	Age	Length (in m)	Jockey	Trainer	Owner	Time
1982	Yeonan Budu	4	Dirt 2400m	Kim Gui-bae	-	KRA	2:50.0
1983	Ssangdumacha	5	Dirt 2400m	Kim Myeong-guk	-	KRA	2:44.2
1984	Jingyeok	5	Dirt 2000m	Kim Myeong-guk	-	KRA	2:13.9
1985	Cheondung	4	Dirt 2000m	Baek Won-gi	Choi Yeon-hong	KRA	2:08.7
1986	Gangtaja	5	Dirt 2000m	Seo Chang-su	Lee Bong-rae	KRA	2:11.1
1987	Obiho	3	Dirt 2000m	Jeong Tae-mun	Lee Wang-eon	KRA	2:12.0
1988	Gangtaja	7	Dirt 2000m	Ji Yong-cheol	Lee Bong-rae	KRA	2:14.3
1989	Chadol	5	Dirt 2000m	Hong Dae-yu	Park Won-seon	KRA	2:12.5
1990	Gomdori	7	Dirt 2000m	Choi Jae-gu	Hong Seong-beom	KRA	2:16.0
1991	Sangwigwon	6	Dirt 2000m	Kim Jong-on	Jang Du-cheon	KRA	2:13.0
1992	Boeun	4	Dirt 2200m	Park Tae-jong	Kim Byeong-yong	KRA	2:27.0
1993	Godaesan	5	Dirt 2200m	An Byeong-gi	Go Ok-bong	KRA	2:27.0
1994	Boeun	8	Dirt 2200m	Kim Changok	Kim Byeong-yong	Shin Yeong-hwa	2:24.6
1995	Kebwi	7	Dirt 2300m	Park Taejong	Park Heung-jin	Lee Geung-beom	2:28.9
1996	Bwirora	6	Dirt 2300m	Park Taejong	Ha Jae-heung	Kwon Jeong-dal	2:33.3
1997	Bada	5	Dirt 2300m	Bae Hyujun	Park Won-deok	Lee Jeong-won	2:31.7
1998	Useung Yegam	3	Dirt 1400m	Song Seok-heon	Kim Jeom-oh	Kim Sun-chang	1:29.6
1999	Manseokkun	3	Dirt 1400m	Park Tae-jong	Kwon Se-chang	Kim Bok-tae	1:30.3
2000	Haekdolpung	3	Dirt 1400m	Park Tae-jong	Kim Moon-gap	Lee Jong-cheol	1:29.7
2001	Haetbitmaeul	3	Dirt 1800m	Ji Ha-ju	Bae Dae-seon	Yoon Kang-ryeol	1:58.3
2002	Haeamjanggun	3	Dirt 1800m	Im Dae-gyu	Bae Dae-seon	Yoon Heung-yeol	1:58.4
2003	Habidongju	3	Dirt 1800m	Park Tae-jong	Shin Woo-cheol	Kim Woo-sik	1:58.0
2004	Mupae Gangja	3	Dirt 1800m	Kim Hyo-seop	Kim Moon-gap	Kim Ik-young	1:57.6
2005	Saebyeokdongja	3	Dirt 1800m	Cheon Chang-gi	Ha Jae-heung	Kim Kyung-min	1:58.5
2006	Baengnokjeong	3	Dirt 1800m	Hwang Sun-do	Kim Il-sung	Im Sang-yoon	1:57.6
2007	Ebony Storm	3	Dirt 1800m	Moon Jeong-gyun	Kim Dae-geun	Moon Jae-sik	1:56.8
2008	Sangseung Illo	3	Dirt 1800m	Shim Seung-tae	Kim Sang-seok	Kim Won-gu	1:57.4
2009	Sangseunggeryong	3	Dirt 1800m	Jo Seong-gon	Kim Young-kwan	Ryu Yong-sang	1:56.4
2010	Cheonnyeondaero	3	Dirt 1800m	Park Geum-man	Oh Moon-sik	Jeong Gwang-hwa	1:59.0
2011	Gwangyajeil	3	Dirt 1800m	Oh Kyung-hwan	Im Bong-chun	Im Sang-yoon	1:58.9
2012	Jigeum I Sungan	3	Dirt 1800m	Moon Se-young	Ji Yong-cheol	Choi Seong-ryong	1:58.6
2013	Speedy First	3	Dirt 1800m	Fujii	Kim Young-kwan	Ko Jeong-su	1:56.1
2014	Queen's Blade	3	Dirt 1800m	Kim Yong-geun	Kim Young-kwan	Kim Hyeong-ran	1:56.6
2015	Yeong-cheon Ace	3	Dirt 1800m	Choi Si-dae	Baek Kwang-yeol	Lee Jong-hun	1:58.5
2016	Power Blade	3	Dirt 1800m	Kim Yong-geun	Kim Young-kwan	Kim Hyeong-ran	R1:52.2
2017	Final Boss	3	Dirt 1800m	Choi Beom-hyeon	Ji Yong-cheol	Cho Yong-hak	1:57.4
2018	Ecton Blade	3	Dirt 1800m	Da Silva	Kim Young-kwan	Kim Hyeong-ran	1:58.3
2019	Wonderful Fly	3	Dirt 1800m	Moon Se-young	Park Dae-heung	Ji Dae-seop	1:56.7
2020	Save The World	3	Dirt 1800m	Perovic	Kim Young-min	Kim Oh-hui	1:56.8
2021	Winner's Man	3	Dirt 1800m	Choi Si-dae	Choi Ki-hong	Lee Kyung-hee)	1:57.1
2022	Winner Star	3	Dirt 1800m	Perovic	Baek Kwang-yeol	Kang Hun-pyo	1:57.1
2023	Global Hit	3	Dirt 1800m	Kim Hye-seon	Bang Dong-seok	Kim Joon-hyun	1:58.4
2024	Eunpa Sarang	3	Dirt 1800m	Moon Seong-hyeok	Seo In-seok	Lee Mi-kyung	1:56.6
2025	Oasis Blue	3	Dirt 1800m	Jin Gyeom	Baek Kwang-yeol	Lee Jong-hun	1:57.9

== See also ==
- Korea Racing Authority
- Korea Cup
- Horse racing in South Korea
