= Mikki Fight =

Japanese Thoroughbred racehorse (foaled 2021)

Mikki Fight; ミッキーファイト
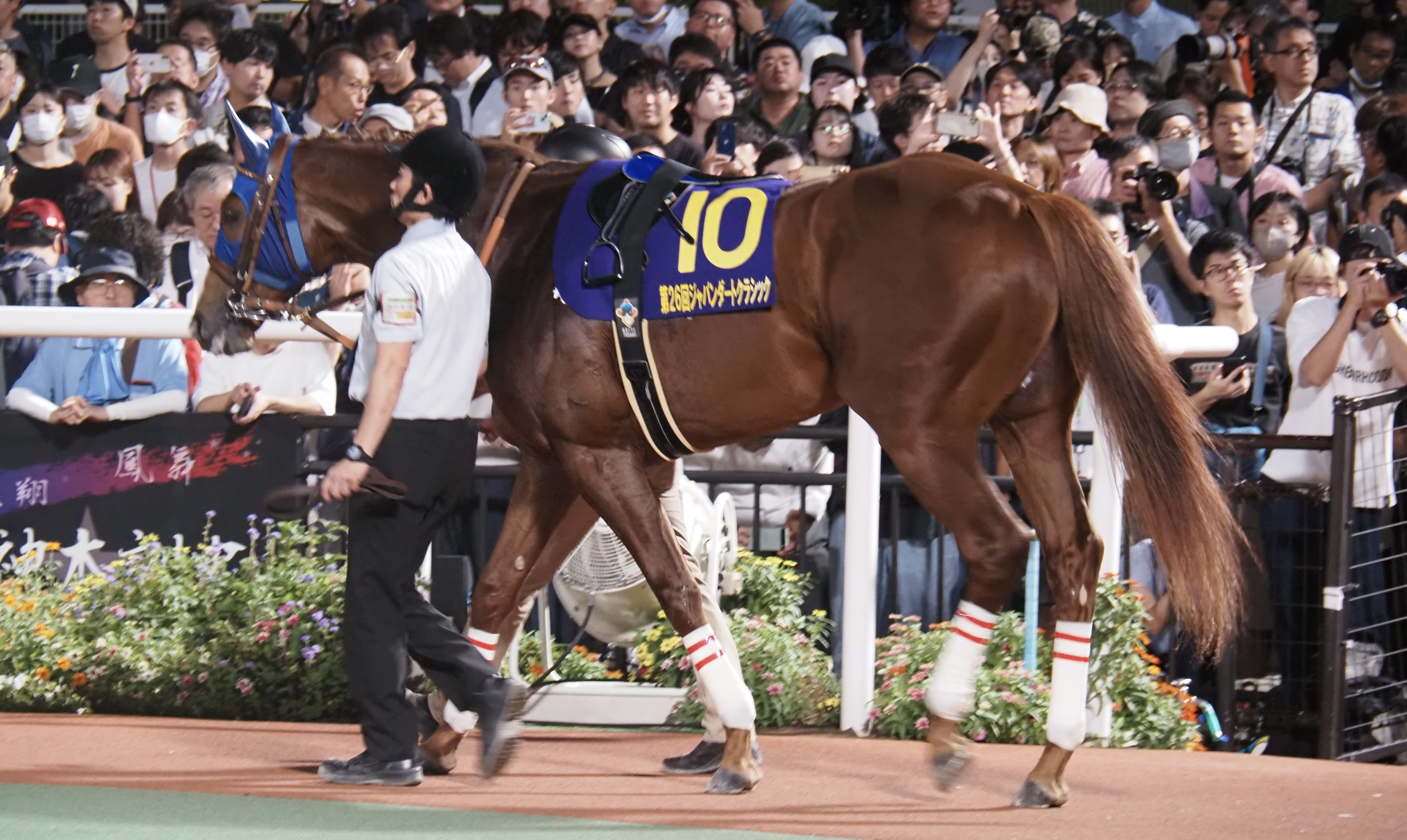
- Mikki Fight at the 2024 Japan Dirt Classic
- Breed: Thoroughbred
- Sire: Drefong
- Grandsire: Gio Ponti
- Dam: Special Groove
- Damsire: Special Week
- Sex: Stallion
- Foaled: 5 May 2021 (age 5)
- Country: Japan
- Colour: Chestnut
- Breeder: Northern Farm
- Owner: Mizuki Noda
- Racing colours
- Trainer: Hiroyasu Tanaka
- Jockey: Keita Tosaki; Christophe Lemaire; Akihide Tsumura
- Record: 14: 9-3-2
- Earnings: ¥548,387,000

Major wins
- Nagoya Daishoten (2024); Leopard Stakes (2024); Antares Stakes (2025); Teio Sho (2025, 2026); Japan Breeding Farms' Cup Classic (2025); Nippon TV Hai (2026)

Mikki Fight (Japanese: ミッキーファイト, Mikkī Faito; foaled 5 May 2021) is a Japanese Thoroughbred racehorse. He competed from 2023 to 2026, recording eight wins from thirteen starts, primarily on dirt surfaces. His major victories include the Teio Sho (JpnI) in 2025 and 2026, the Japan Breeding Farms' Cup Classic (JpnI) in 2025, the Nagoya Daishoten (JpnIII) in 2024, the Leopard Stakes (GIII) in 2024, and the Antares Stakes (GIII) in 2025. His consecutive victories in the Teio Sho made him the second horse in history to achieve the feat.

== Background ==
Mikki Fight is a chestnut stallion bred in Abira, Hokkaido, by Northern Farm. He was sired by Drefong, an American-bred stallion by Gio Ponti, and his dam was Special Groove (スペシャルグルーヴ), a mare by Special Week. Special Groove is a daughter of the mare Air Groove, who won the 1996 Yushun Himba and the 1997 Tennō Shō (Autumn), making Mikki Fight a close relative to multiple Grade 1 winners such as Duramente and Rulership. He is owned by Mizuki Noda (Danox Co., Ltd.) and was trained by Hiroyasu Tanaka at the Miho Training Center. His name combines the owner's prefix "Mikki" with "Fight," meaning "do your best."

== Racing career ==
=== 2023: two-year-old season ===
Mikki Fight debuted on 15 October 2023 in a maiden race on dirt at Tokyo Racecourse, winning under jockey Akihide Tsumura. He won his second start in a 1-win class race at Nakayama Racecourse on 10 December by five lengths.

=== 2024: three-year-old season ===
Mikki Fight finished third in the Unicorn Stakes (GIII) on 27 April. After a brief break, he won the Leopard Stakes (GIII) at Niigata Racecourse on 4 August, securing his first graded stakes victory and a priority entry to the Japan Dirt Classic. On 2 October, he contested the Japan Dirt Classic (JpnI) at Ohi Racecourse, finishing second to Forever Young. He was initially aimed at the Champions Cup but was excluded due to insufficient earnings. Instead, he ran in the Nagoya Daishoten (JpnIII) on 19 December, where he set a track record of 2:07.4 to claim his second graded stakes win.

=== 2025: four-year-old season ===
Mikki Fight started his season in the February Stakes (GI) on 23 February, finishing third behind Costa Nova and Sunrise Zipangu. On 19 April, with Christophe Lemaire taking over riding duties, he won the Antares Stakes (GIII) at Hanshin Racecourse. On 2 July, he won the Teio Sho (JpnI) at Ohi Racecourse, recording his first top-level victory. He followed this with a dominant three-length victory in the Japan Breeding Farms' Cup Classic (JpnI) at Funabashi Racecourse on 3 November. He ended the year with a narrow second-place finish in the Tokyo Daishoten (GI) on 29 December, beaten by Diktaean.

=== 2026: five-year-old season ===
Mikki Fight was initially invited to the Dubai World Cup in March, but the trip was cancelled due to the Iran War that had started about a month prior the race was due. He instead targeted the Kashiwa Kinen (JpnI) on 5 May, where he finished second to Wilson Tesoro. On 1 July, he contested the Teio Sho again and won by 1.75 lengths, becoming the second horse in history (after Meisho Hario) to win the race in consecutive years. His season continued in the second half of the year at the Nippon TV Hai, in which he broke away from third place in the middle of the straight and won by three lengths over the second place finisher, T O Marconi.

== Statistics ==
The following table details all 14 starts of Mikki Fight's racing career. Record current as of 30 September 2026.

Date	Distance (Condition)	Race	Class	Course	Odds (Favourite)	Field	Finish	Time	Jockey	Winning (Losing) Margin	Winner (2nd Place)	Ref
2023 – two-year-old season
Oct 15	Dirt 1600 m (Sloppy)	2-Y-O Newcomer	Maiden	Tokyo	3.9 (2nd)	16	1st	1:38.4	Akihide Tsumura	0.0	(Central Valley)	
Dec 10	Dirt 1800 m (Fast)	2-Y-O 1-Win	Allowance	Nakayama	3.4 (1st)	16	1st	1:52.5	Keita Tosaki	–0.8	(Blue Sun)	
2024 – three-year-old season
Apr 27	Dirt 1900 m (Fast)	Unicorn Stakes	GIII	Kyoto	2.8 (1st)	16	3rd	1:59.3	Keita Tosaki	0.7	Ramjet	
Aug 4	Dirt 1800 m (Fast)	Leopard Stakes	GIII	Niigata	2.2 (1st)	15	1st	1:51.2	Keita Tosaki	–0.2	(Satono Phoenix)	
Oct 2	Dirt 2000 m (Fast)	Japan Dirt Classic	JpnI	Ohi	6.5 (3rd)	15	2nd	2:04.3	Keita Tosaki	0.2	Forever Young	
Dec 19	Dirt 2000 m (Fast)	Nagoya Daishoten	JpnIII	Nagoya	2.6 (2nd)	12	1st	R2:07.4	Keita Tosaki	0.0	(Notturno)	
2025 – four-year-old season
Feb 23	Dirt 1600 m (Fast)	February Stakes	GI	Tokyo	3.3 (1st)	16	3rd	1:35.9	Keita Tosaki	0.4	Costa Nova	
Apr 19	Dirt 1800 m (Fast)	Antares Stakes	GIII	Hanshin	1.8 (1st)	12	1st	1:51.3	Christophe Lemaire	–0.4	(Tight Knit)	
Jul 2	Dirt 2000 m (Fast)	Teio Sho	JpnI	Ohi	1.7 (1st)	13	1st	2:03.1	Christophe Lemaire	0.0	(Outrange)	
Nov 3	Dirt 1800 m (Good)	Japan Breeding Farms' Cup Classic	JpnI	Funabashi	1.7 (1st)	14	1st	1:52.0	Christophe Lemaire	–0.6	(Meisho Hario)	
Dec 29	Dirt 2000 m (Muddy)	Tokyo Daishoten	GI	Ohi	1.4 (1st)	15	2nd	2:04.3	Christophe Lemaire	0.0	Diktaean	
2026 – five-year-old season
May 5	Dirt 1600 m (Fast)	Kashiwa Kinen	JpnI	Funabashi	1.7 (1st)	13	2nd	1:38.7	Christophe Lemaire	0.1	Wilson Tesoro	
Jul 1	Dirt 2000 m (Good)	Teio Sho	JpnI	Ohi	1.7 (1st)	13	1st	2:02.8	Keita Tosaki	–0.3	(Outrange)	
Sep 30	Dirt 1800 m (Sloppy)	Nippon TV Hai	JpnII	Funabashi	1.2 (1st)	9	1st	1:52.1	Keita Tosaki	–0.6	(T O Marconi)	

- R indicated that it was a record time finish

== Pedigree ==
Pedigree of Mikki Fight (JPN)
Sire Drefong (USA) 2013	Gio Ponti (USA); 2005	Tale of the Cat	Storm Cat
Sire Drefong (USA) 2013	Gio Ponti (USA); 2005	Tale of the Cat	Yarn
Sire Drefong (USA) 2013	Gio Ponti (USA); 2005	Chipeta Springs	Alydar
Sire Drefong (USA) 2013	Gio Ponti (USA); 2005	Chipeta Springs	Salt Spring
Sire Drefong (USA) 2013	Eltimaas (USA); 2007	Ghostzapper	Awesome Again
Sire Drefong (USA) 2013	Eltimaas (USA); 2007	Ghostzapper	Baby Zip
Sire Drefong (USA) 2013	Eltimaas (USA); 2007	Najecam	Trempolino
Sire Drefong (USA) 2013	Eltimaas (USA); 2007	Najecam	Sue Warner
Dam Special Groove (JPN) 2007	Special Week (JPN); 1995	Sunday Silence	Halo
Dam Special Groove (JPN) 2007	Special Week (JPN); 1995	Sunday Silence	Wishing Well
Dam Special Groove (JPN) 2007	Special Week (JPN); 1995	Campaign Girl	Maruzensky
Dam Special Groove (JPN) 2007	Special Week (JPN); 1995	Campaign Girl	Lady Shiraoki
Dam Special Groove (JPN) 2007	Sonic Groove (JPN); 2003	French Deputy	Deputy Minister
Dam Special Groove (JPN) 2007	Sonic Groove (JPN); 2003	French Deputy	Mitterand
Dam Special Groove (JPN) 2007	Sonic Groove (JPN); 2003	Air Groove	Tony Bin
Dam Special Groove (JPN) 2007	Sonic Groove (JPN); 2003	Air Groove	Dyna Carle

- Mikki Fight is inbred 5 × 4 to Deputy Minister.
- His sire Drefong won the 2016 King's Bishop Stakes.
- His dam Special Groove is a half-sister to the dam of Admire Groove, and his third dam Air Groove won the 1997 Yushun Himba.
- His half-brother Jun Light Bolt won the 2022 Champions Cup.

== See also ==
- Thoroughbred racing in Japan
- Teio Sho
