= Diktaean =

Japanese Thoroughbred racehorse (foaled 2018)

Diktaean ディクテオン
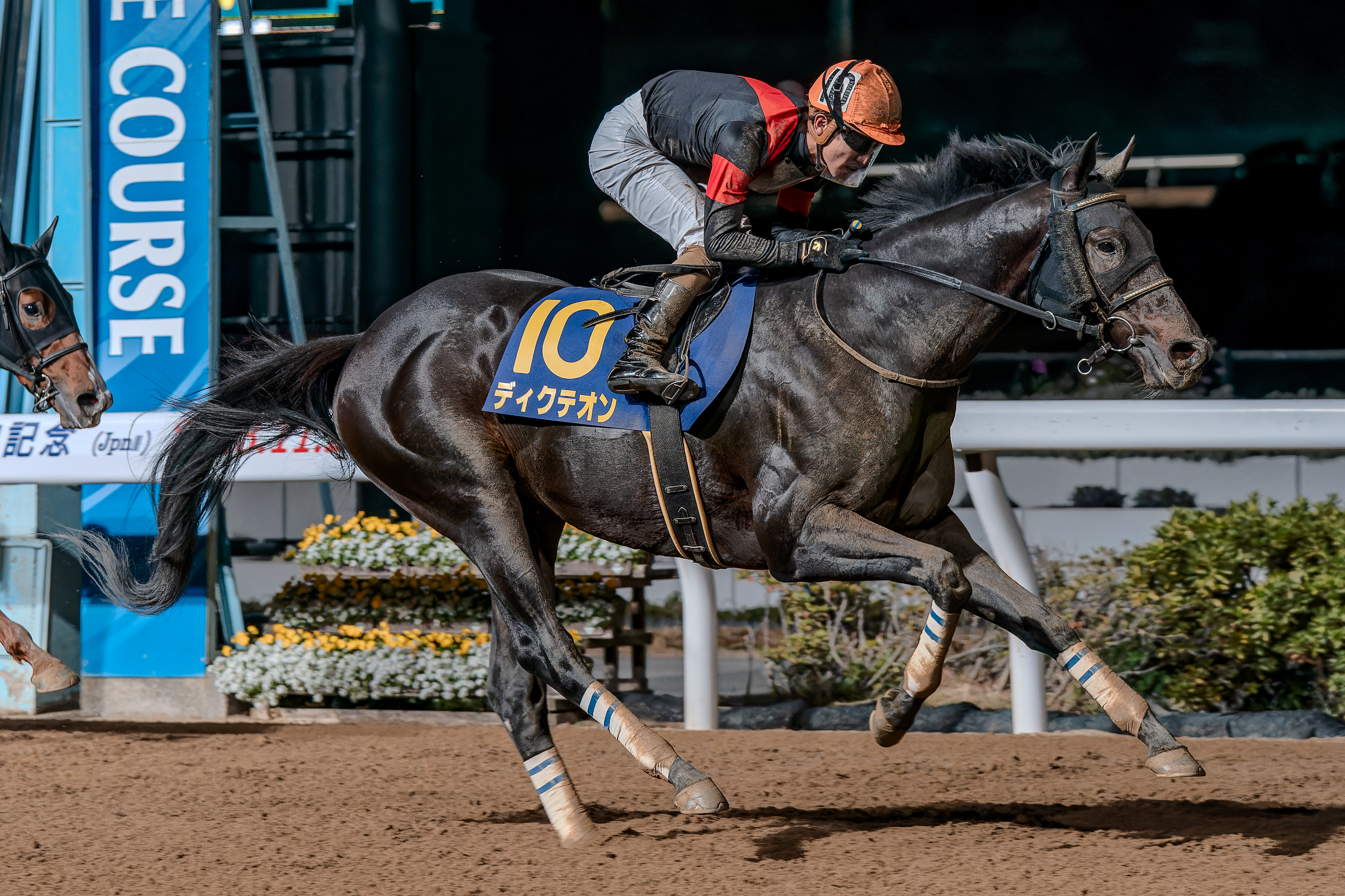
- Diktaean at the 2023 Urawa Kinen
- Breed: Thoroughbred
- Sire: King Kamehameha
- Grandsire: Kingmambo
- Dam: Medeia
- Damsire: King Halo
- Sex: Gelding
- Foaled: 10 March 2018
- Country: Japan
- Colour: Dark bay
- Breeder: Oiwake Farm
- Owner: G1 Racing
- Racing colours
- Trainer: Hideaki Fujiwara; Teruya Tsunoda; Tatsuya Yoshioka; Katsunori Arayama
- Jockey: Takashi Yano
- Record: 34: 12-1-4 (16 JRA: 4-0-2; 16 NAR: 6-1-2; 2 overseas: 2-0-0)
- Earnings: ¥399,020,000

Major wins
- Tokyo Daishoten (2025); Korea Cup (2025, 2026); Urawa Kinen (2023); Nagoya Grand Prix (2023); Hakusan Daishoten (2024)

Awards
- NAR Grand Prix Horse of the Year (2025)

Diktaean (Japanese: ディクテオン, Dikuteon; foaled 10 March 2018) is a Japanese Thoroughbred racehorse. He has competed since 2021, recording eleven wins from thirty-three starts, including the Tokyo Daishoten (GI) in 2025, the Korea Cup (G3) in 2025 and (G2) in 2026; the Urawa Kinen (JpnII) in 2023, the Nagoya Grand Prix (JpnII) in 2023, and the Hakusan Daishoten (JpnIII) in 2024. His victory in the Korea Cup was the first overseas dirt graded stakes win by a NAR-affiliated horse. His victory in the Tokyo Daishoten was the first by a NAR-affiliated horse since Adjudi Mitsuo in 2005. He was named NAR Grand Prix Horse of the Year and Best Four-Year-Old and Up Male in 2025. His name refers to the Dictaean Cave, the birthplace of Zeus in Greek mythology, chosen in association with his dam's name Medeia.

== Background ==
Diktaean is a dark bay gelding bred in Abira, Hokkaido, by Oiwake Farm. He was sired by King Kamehameha, a son of Mr. Prospector, and his dam was Medeia (メーデイア), a mare who won six graded races including the 2013 JBC Ladies Classic. His damsire was King Halo. He is owned by G1 Racing and was initially trained by Hideaki Fujiwara at the JRA's Ritto Training Center.

== Racing career ==
=== 2021: three-year-old season ===
Diktaean debuted on 1 May 2021 in a maiden race on the turf at Hanshin Racecourse, finishing last of fifteen. He finished unplaced in two further JRA maiden races before being transferred to Teruya Tsunoda's stable at Nagoya Racecourse in August. He won two consecutive races at Nagoya in October, then was transferred back to JRA training under Tatsuya Yoshioka at Ritto in December.

=== 2022: four-year-old season ===
Diktaean won a 1-win class race on the dirt at Kokura Racecourse on 6 February. He won the Isesaki Tokubetsu (2-win class) at Tokyo Racecourse on 29 October and the Banshu Stakes (3-win class) at Tokyo on 19 November, completing consecutive victories to gain open-class status.

=== 2023: five-year-old season ===
Diktaean finished ninth in the Tokai Stakes (GII) on 22 January and fourth in the Nagoya Castle Stakes (Open) on 19 March. On 30 April, he won the Brilliant Stakes (Listed) at Tokyo. He finished fourth in the Brazil Cup (Listed) on 22 October. On 23 November, he won the Urawa Kinen (JpnII) at Urawa Racecourse, defeating Mitono O by 0.5 seconds. On 21 December, he won the Nagoya Grand Prix (JpnII) at Nagoya in a course-record time of 2:12.4, defeating Grand Bridge by 0.4 seconds.

=== 2024: six-year-old season ===
Diktaean finished fourth in the Diolite Kinen (JpnII) on 6 March, fourth in the Kawasaki Kinen (JpnI) on 3 April, and fourth in the Nagoya Grand Prix (JpnII) on 6 May. He finished third in the Teio Sho (JpnI) at Oi Racecourse on 26 June. On 23 September, he won the Hakusan Daishoten (JpnIII) at Kanazawa Racecourse by 1.0 seconds. He finished fourth in the Urawa Kinen (JpnII) on 20 November.

=== 2025: seven-year-old season ===
On 15 January, Diktaean was transferred to Katsunori Arayama's stable at Oi Racecourse. His JRA registration was cancelled on 17 January. He finished fourth in the Diolite Kinen (JpnII) on 12 March and second in the Kawasaki Kinen (JpnI) on 9 April. He finished fourth in the Teio Sho (JpnI) on 2 July.

On 7 September, Diktaean contested the Korea Cup (G3) at Seoul Racecourse. He won by 0.2 seconds, defeating the Hong Kong-trained Chancheng Glory. This was the first overseas dirt graded stakes victory by a NAR-affiliated horse, and the first by any Japanese NAR horse since Cosmo Bulk won the Singapore Airlines International Cup in 2006.

On 29 December, Diktaean won the Tokyo Daishoten (GI) at Oi Racecourse at odds of 77.3 (7th favourite), defeating Mikki Fight by 0.0 seconds. This was the first Tokyo Daishoten victory by a NAR-affiliated horse since Adjudi Mitsuo in 2005. Trainer Katsunori Arayama became the first person to win the race as both jockey (White Silver) and trainer, and completed a father-son double with his late father Tokuichi Arayama.

=== 2026: eight-year-old season ===
Diktaean finished fifth in the Kawasaki Kinen (JpnI) on 8 April. He finished third in the Teio Sho (JpnI) at Oi on 1 July. He resumed his season at the Korea Cup in September. The horse got off to a slow start and raced from the back of the pack, but moved up to second place just before the final straight and overtook another Japanese horse, Sunday Funday, who had led the race from the start to win by a six-length margin on the line.

== Statistics ==
Record current as of 6 September 2026.

Date	Distance (Condition)	Race	Class	Course	Odds (Favourite)	Field	Finish	Time	Jockey	Winning (Losing) Margin	Winner (2nd Place)	Ref
2021 – three-year-old season
May 1	Turf 1800 m (Good)	3-Y-O Maiden	Maiden	Hanshin	70.1 (8th)	15	15th	1:51.0	Shoji Okada	5.3	Cordial	
Jul 24	Dirt 1800 m (Good)	3-Y-O Maiden	Maiden	Niigata	21.6 (9th)	15	9th	1:55.7	Mirai Iwata	2.3	Hishi Kamui	
Aug 14	Turf 2000 m (Soft)	3-Y-O Maiden	Maiden	Kokura	19.9 (6th)	12	10th	2:06.5	Kanichiro Fujii	2.4	Shosan Ichimatsu	
Oct 1	Dirt 1400 m (Good)	3-Y-O Maiden	Maiden	Nagoya	1.8 (1st)	11	1st	1:28.4	Makoto Okabe	–1.5	(Preferred Run)	
Oct 13	Dirt 1400 m (Yielding)	3-Y-O Condition	Condition	Nagoya	1.0 (1st)	10	1st	1:29.3	Makoto Okabe	–0.9	(Good Spencer)	
2022 – four-year-old season
Jan 23	Dirt 1700 m (Heavy)	4-Y-O+ 1-Win	Allowance	Kokura	8.8 (5th)	16	7th	1:46.9	Hayato Yoshida	1.0	A la Mode Bio	
Feb 6	Dirt 2400 m (Good)	4-Y-O+ 1-Win	Allowance	Kokura	3.1 (1st)	11	1st	2:36.1	Hayato Yoshida	–0.9	(Mystery Way)	
Apr 9	Dirt 2400 m (Good)	Inzai Tokubetsu	Allowance	Nakayama	3.4 (1st)	16	5th	2:35.4	Akira Sugawara	0.6	Fist Bump	
Apr 30	Dirt 2100 m (Heavy)	4-Y-O+ 2-Win	Allowance	Tokyo	6.3 (3rd)	14	3rd	2:10.6	Takeshi Yokoyama	0.4	Kistler	
Jun 25	Dirt 2000 m (Good)	Takatori Tokubetsu	Allowance	Hanshin	7.6 (6th)	16	10th	2:08.1	Mirai Iwata	2.4	Kafuji Octagon	
Oct 10	Dirt 2100 m (Heavy)	Shosenkyo Tokubetsu	Allowance	Tokyo	4.4 (2nd)	16	3rd	2:08.4	Kazuo Yokoyama	0.5	Seven Days	
Oct 29	Dirt 2100 m (Good)	Isesaki Tokubetsu	Allowance	Tokyo	2.9 (1st)	16	1st	2:11.6	Kohei Matsuyama	–0.3	(King Saga)	
Nov 19	Dirt 2100 m (Good)	Banshu Stakes	Allowance	Tokyo	2.5 (1st)	16	1st	2:11.0	Yuga Kawada	0.0	(Danon Luster)	
2023 – five-year-old season
Jan 22	Dirt 1800 m (Good)	Tokai Stakes	GII	Chukyo	43.3 (11th)	15	9th	1:53.0	Kohei Matsuyama	1.8	Promised Warrior	
Mar 19	Dirt 1800 m (Yielding)	Nagoyajo Stakes	Open	Chukyo	16.2 (7th)	16	4th	1:51.0	Hayato Yoshida	0.8	Le Corsaire	
Apr 30	Dirt 2100 m (Good)	Brilliant Stakes	Listed	Tokyo	6.9 (4th)	16	1st	2:10.0	Akira Sugawara	0.0	(Danon Luster)	
Jun 17	Dirt 2100 m (Good)	Sleipnir Stakes	Open	Tokyo	5.9 (3rd)	16	11th	2:10.9	Akira Sugawara	1.6	Danon Luster	
Oct 22	Dirt 2100 m (Good)	Brazil Cup	Listed	Tokyo	9.0 (4th)	16	4th	2:10.4	Akira Sugawara	0.5	Tenkaharu	
Nov 23	Dirt 2000 m (Good)	Urawa Kinen	JpnII	Urawa	11.0 (5th)	12	1st	2:06.6	Masashige Honda	–0.5	(Mitono O)	
Dec 21	Dirt 2100 m (Good)	Nagoya Grand Prix	JpnII	Nagoya	2.4 (2nd)	12	1st	R2:12.4	Makoto Okabe	–0.4	(Grand Bridge)	
2024 – six-year-old season
Mar 6	Dirt 2400 m (Soft)	Diolite Kinen	JpnII	Funabashi	3.1 (3rd)	11	4th	2:35.3	Masashige Honda	1.4	Seraphic Call	
Apr 3	Dirt 2100 m (Heavy)	Kawasaki Kinen	JpnI	Kawasaki	18.9 (6th)	11	4th	2:15.7	Masashige Honda	0.2	Light Warrior	
May 6	Dirt 2100 m (Good)	Nagoya Grand Prix	JpnII	Nagoya	2.3 (2nd)	12	4th	2:13.8	Makoto Okabe	2.9	Notturno	
Jun 26	Dirt 2000 m (Yielding)	Teio Sho	JpnI	Oi	46.3 (9th)	13	3rd	2:07.4	Kazuo Yokoyama	0.5	King's Sword	
Sep 23	Dirt 2100 m (Heavy)	Hakusan Daishoten	JpnIII	Kanazawa	2.2 (1st)	12	1st	2:11.1	Kazuo Yokoyama	–1.0	(Daishin Pisces)	
Nov 20	Dirt 2000 m (Yielding)	Urawa Kinen	JpnII	Urawa	1.7 (1st)	11	4th	2:07.6	Kazuo Yokoyama	1.6	Outrange	
2025 – seven-year-old season
Mar 12	Dirt 2400 m (Heavy)	Diolite Kinen	JpnII	Funabashi	7.5 (4th)	13	4th	2:35.8	Hiroto Yoshihara	1.1	Seraphic Call	
Apr 9	Dirt 2100 m (Yielding)	Kawasaki Kinen	JpnI	Kawasaki	21.6 (6th)	13	2nd	2:18.1	Takashi Yano	0.1	Meisho Hario	
Jul 2	Dirt 2000 m (Good)	Teio Sho	JpnI	Oi	39.7 (7th)	13	4th	2:03.9	Takashi Yano	0.8	Mikki Fight	
Sep 7	Dirt 1800 m (Good)	Korea Cup	G3	Seoul	7.1 (3rd)	11	1st	1:50.8	Takashi Yano	–0.2	(Chancheng Glory)	
Dec 29	Dirt 2000 m (Heavy)	Tokyo Daishoten	GI	Oi	77.3 (7th)	15	1st	2:04.3	Takashi Yano	0.0	(Mikki Fight)	
2026 – eight-year-old season
Apr 8	Dirt 2100 m (Yielding)	Kawasaki Kinen	JpnI	Kawasaki	4.0 (2nd)	11	5th	2:16.0	Takashi Yano	1.4	Kazeno Runner	
Jul 1	Dirt 2000 m (Yielding)	Teio Sho	JpnI	Oi	14.5 (6th)	13	3rd	2:03.1	Takashi Yano	0.3	Mikki Fight	
Sep 6	Dirt 1800 m (Good)	Korea Cup	G2	Seoul	2.9 (2nd)	9	1st	1:51.7	Takashi Yano	–1.1	(Sunday Funday)	

== Pedigree ==
Pedigree of Diktaean (JPN)
Sire King Kamehameha (JPN) 2001	Kingmambo (USA); 1990	Mr. Prospector	Raise a Native
Sire King Kamehameha (JPN) 2001	Kingmambo (USA); 1990	Mr. Prospector	Gold Digger
Sire King Kamehameha (JPN) 2001	Kingmambo (USA); 1990	Miesque	Nureyev
Sire King Kamehameha (JPN) 2001	Kingmambo (USA); 1990	Miesque	Pasadoble
Sire King Kamehameha (JPN) 2001	Manfath (IRE); 1991	Last Tycoon	Try My Best
Sire King Kamehameha (JPN) 2001	Manfath (IRE); 1991	Last Tycoon	Mill Princess
Sire King Kamehameha (JPN) 2001	Manfath (IRE); 1991	Pilot Bird	Blakeney
Sire King Kamehameha (JPN) 2001	Manfath (IRE); 1991	Pilot Bird	The Dancer
Dam Medeia (JPN) 2008	King Halo (JPN); 1995	Dancing Brave	Lyphard
Dam Medeia (JPN) 2008	King Halo (JPN); 1995	Dancing Brave	Navajo Princess
Dam Medeia (JPN) 2008	King Halo (JPN); 1995	Goodbye Halo	Halo
Dam Medeia (JPN) 2008	King Halo (JPN); 1995	Goodbye Halo	Pound Foolish
Dam Medeia (JPN) 2008	Witchful Thinking (USA); 1994	Lord Avie	Lord Gaylord
Dam Medeia (JPN) 2008	Witchful Thinking (USA); 1994	Lord Avie	Avie
Dam Medeia (JPN) 2008	Witchful Thinking (USA); 1994	Halloween Joy	Exuberant
Dam Medeia (JPN) 2008	Witchful Thinking (USA); 1994	Halloween Joy	Halloween

- Diktaean is inbred 5 × 5 to Northern Dancer (9.38%).
- His sire King Kamehameha won the 2004 Tōkyō Yūshun and NHK Mile Cup.
- His dam Medeia won six graded races including the 2013 JBC Ladies Classic.

== See also ==
- Thoroughbred racing in Japan
- Tokyo Daishoten
- Korea Cup (horse racing)
