= Antares Stakes =

Antares Stakes アンタレスステークス
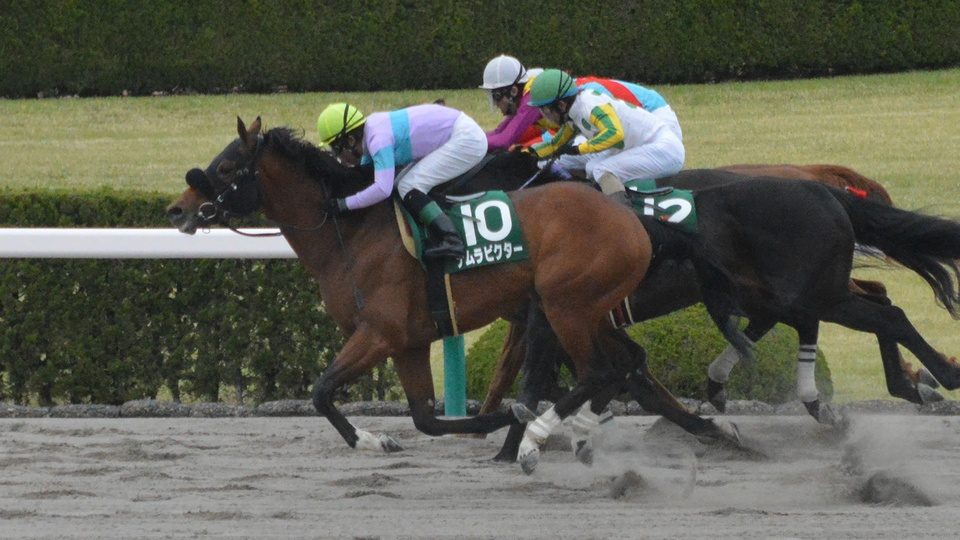
- 2014 Antares Stakes winner Namura Victor
- Class: Grade 3
- Location: Hanshin Racecourse
- Inaugurated: 1996
- Race type: Thoroughbred Flat racing

Race information
- Distance: 1800 metres
- Surface: Dirt
- Track: Right-handed
- Qualification: 4-y-o+
- Weight: Special Weight
- Purse: ¥ 82,380,000 (as of 2025): 1st: ¥ 38,000,000; 2nd: ¥ 15,000,000; 3rd: ¥ 10,000,000

The Antares Stakes (Japanese アンタレスステークス) is a Japanese Grade 3 horse race for Thoroughbreds aged four and over, run in April over a distance of 1800 metres on dirt at Hanshin Racecourse.

The Antares Stakes was first run in 1996 and has held Grade 3 status ever since. The race was run at Kyoto Racecourse from 1997 to 2011.

== Race details ==
The race is run on a right-handed track at Hanshin Racecourse over a distance of 1,800 meters on dirt.

=== Weight ===
57 kg for four-year-olds and above.
Allowances:

- 2 kg for fillies / mares
- 1 kg for southern hemisphere bred three-year-olds

Penalties (excluding two-year-old race performance):

- If a graded stakes race has been won within a year:
  - 3 kg for a grade 1 win (2 kg for fillies / mares)
  - 2 kg for a grade 2 win (1 kg for fillies / mares)
  - 1 kg for a grade 3 win
- If a graded stakes race has been won for more than a year:
  - 2 kg for a grade 1 win (1 kg for fillies / mares)
  - 1 kg for a grade 2 win

== Past winners ==
Year	Winner	Age	Jockey	Trainer	Owner	Time
1996	Theseus Frise	4	Yutaka Take	Tsutomu Niizeki	Keiko Taguchi	1:50.1
1997	M.I.Blanc	5	Yutaka Take	Shuji Ito	Yutaka Inami	1:50.7
1998	Wild Blaster	6	Hiroki Hashimoto	Hitoshi Arai	Yoshinobu Hayashi	1:50.0
1999	Osumi Jet	5	Hirofumi Shii	Toshiaki Shirai	Hidenori Yamaji	1:49.5
2000	Smart Boy	5	Naoto Ito	Keizo Ito	Grand Bokujo	1:49.6
2001	Smart Boy	6	Naoto Ito	Keizo Ito	Grand Bokujo	1:50.6
2002	Hagino High Grade	6	Yutaka Take	Kunihide Matsuda	Kokichi Hinokuma	1:48.7
2003	Gold Allure	4	Yutaka Take	Yasuo Ikee	Shadai Race Horse	1:49.7
2004	Time Paradox	6	Katsumi Ando	Hiroyoshi Matsuda	Shadai Race Horse	1:51.5
2005	Pit Fighter	6	Katsumi Ando	Yukihiro Kato	Hiroyoshi Usuda	1:49.8
2006	Fifty Oner	4	Yutaka Take	Takayuki Yasuda	Carrot Farm	1:49.0
2007	Wild Wonder	5	Yasunari Iwata	Takashi Kubota	Tsunefumi Kusama	1:49.9
2008	Wonder Speed	6	Futoshi Komaki	Tomohiko Hatsuki	Nobuyuki Yamamoto	1:50.5
2009	War Tactics	4	Yuga Kawada	Yasutoshi Ikee	Sunday Racing	1:47.8
2010	Daishin Orange	5	Yuga Kawada	Yasushi Shono	Nobuyuki Oyagi	1:49.7
2011	Gold Blitz	4	Hironobu Tanabe	Naohiro Yoshida	Carrot Farm	1:48.1
2012	Gold Blitz	5	Yuga Kawada	Naohiro Yoshida	Carrot Farm	1:49.9
2013	Hokko Tarumae	4	Yasunari Iwata	Katsuichi Nishiura	Koichi Yabe	1:49.7
2014	Namura Victor	5	Futoshi Komaki	Nobuharu Fukushima	Nobushige Namura	1:51.5
2015	Kurino Star O	5	Hideaki Miyuki	Yoshitada Takahashi	Mamoru Kurimoto	1:49.6
2016	Awardee	6	Yutaka Take	Mikio Matsunaga	Koji Maeda	1:49.9
2017	Molto Bene	5	Mirco Demuro	Masahiro Matsunaga	Masayoshi Miyake	1:49.9
2018	Great Pearl	5	Yuga Kawada	Mitsumasa Nakauchida	H.H. Sheikh Fahad	1:49.8
2019	Another Truth	5	Takuya Ono	Noboru Takagi	Normandy Thoroughbred Racing	1:50.8
2020	Westerlund	8	Yusuke Fujioka	Shozo Sasaki	Sunday Racing	1:49.8
2021	T O Keynes	4	Fuma Matsuwaka	Daisuke Takayanagi	Tomoya Ozaki	1:49.0
2022	Omega Perfume	7	Kazuo Yokoyama	Shogo Yasuda	Reiko Hara	1:50.5
2023	Promised Warrior	6	Katsuma Sameshima	Kenji Nonaka	Silk Racing	1:49.5
2024	Mikki Nuchibana	6	Keisuke Dazai	Ryo Takahashi	Mizuki Noda	1:51.2
2025	Mikki Fight	4	Christophe Lemaire	Hiroyasu Tanaka	Mizuki Noda	1:51.3
2026	Meursault	5	Ryusei Sakai	Yasutoshi Ikee	Yuji Hasegawa	1:50.3

== See also ==
- Horse racing in Japan
- List of Japanese flat horse races
