= Unicorn Stakes =

Unicorn Stakes ユニコーンステークス
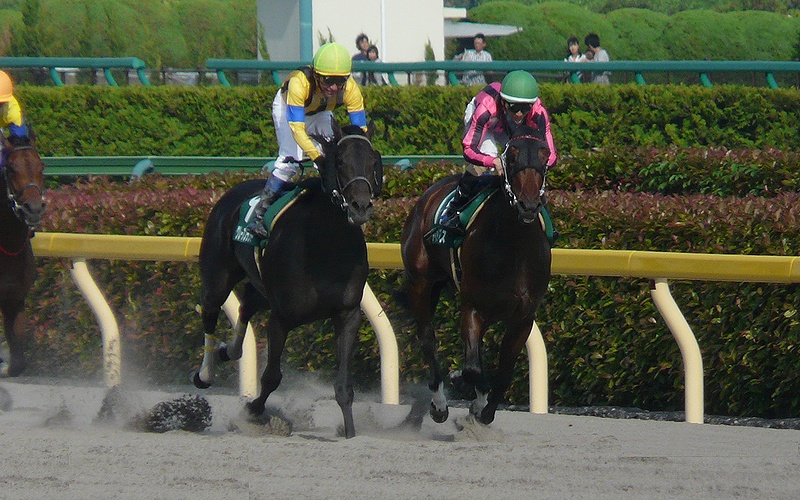
- I Am Actress wins the 2011 Unicorn Stakes
- Class: Grade 3
- Location: Kyoto Racecourse
- Inaugurated: 1996
- Race type: Thoroughbred Flat racing

Race information
- Distance: 1,900 meters
- Surface: Dirt
- Track: Right-handed
- Qualification: 3-y-o
- Weight: 57 kg Allowance: Fillies 2 kg
- Purse: ¥ 79,920,000 (as of 2026): 1st: ¥ 37,000,000; 2nd: ¥ 15,000,000; 3rd: ¥ 9,000,000

The Unicorn Stakes (Japanese ユニコーンステークス) is a Grade 3 horse race for three-year-old Thoroughbreds run in Japan in April over a distance of 1,900 metres on dirt at Kyoto Racecourse.

The race was first run in 1996 and has held Grade 3 status ever since. The race was run over 1,800 meters at Nakayama Racecourse in 1996, 1998, 1999 and 2000 before being moved to Tokyo Racecourse in 2001 until 2023 and was run over 1,600 meters. The race was permanently moved to Kyoto Racecourse in 2024, and the distance was also increased to 1,900 meters. The schedule was also moved from June to late April, positioned as a preparatory race for the Tokyo Derby, which is run in June and for which the Unicorn Stakes winner receives a guaranteed spot.

Past winners of the race have included Taiki Shuttle, Agnes Digital and Kane Hekili.

== Records ==
Record time:

- 1:56.8 - Canal Beagle 2025, at a distance of 1,900 meters
- 1:34.9 - Cafe Pharoah 2020, at a distance of 1,600 meters

Most wins by a jockey:

- 2 - Yukio Okabe 1996, 1997
- 2 - Katsumi Ando 2003, 2008
- 2 - Yutaka Take 2005, 2007
- 2 - Yuichi Fukunaga 2012, 2019

Most wins by a trainer:

- 2 - Sei Ishizaka 2001, 2013
- 2 - Katsuhiko Sumii 2005, 2019
- 2 - Noriyuki Hori 2012, 2020

== Winners ==
Year	Winner	Jockey	Trainer	Owner	Time
1996	Shinko Windy	Yukio Okabe	Kiyotaka Tanaka	Osamu Yasuda	1:52.8
1997	Taiki Shuttle	Yukio Okabe	Kazuo Fujisawa	Taiki Farm	1:36.8
1998	Wing Arrow	Katsumi Minai	Yoshimi Kudo	Minoru Ikeda	1:52.0
1999	Gold Tiara^{[a]}	Katsuharu Tanaka	Kunihide Matsuda	Kazuko Yoshida	1:52.6
2000	Agnes Digital	Hitoshi Matoba	Toshiaki Shirai	Takao Watanabe	1:50.7
2001	Nasdaq Power	Teruo Eda	Sei Ishizawa	Fushio Sukimoto	1:36.4
2002	Himitsu Heiki	Seiji Sakai	Mitsuhiro Okabayashi	Harumi Tanaka	1:36.4
2003	Utopia	Katsumi Ando	Kojiro Hashiguchi	Makoto Kaneko	1:35.8
2004	Top of World	Hirofumi Shii	Kenichi Fujioka	Isao Ogawa	1:36.0
2005	Kane Hekili	Yutaka Take	Katsuhiko Sumii	Makoto Kaneko	1:36.5
2006	Nike Earthwork	Norihiro Yokoyama	Masayuki Kawashima	Seiji Ono	1:37.2
2007	Long Pride	Yutaka Take	Yukiharu Ono	Toshio Nakai	1:36.9
2008	Ubiquitous	Katsumi Ando	Nobuhiro Suzuki	Seiichi Iketani	1:35.1
2009	Silk Mobius	Hiroyasu Tanaka	Masazo Ryoke	Silk	1:35.5
2010	Birdie Birdie	Masami Matsuoka	Yasutoshi Ikee	Koichi Hori	1:36.6
2011	I Am Actress^{[a]}	Shinichiro Akiyama	Hiroshi Nagahama	Mihoko Satomi	1:36.2
2012	Straw Hat	Yuichi Fukunaga	Noriyuki Hori	Kaneko Makoto Holdings	1:36.5
2013	Best Warrior	Keita Tosaki	Sei Ishizaka	Yukio Baba	1:36.0
2014	Red Alvis	Masayoshi Ebina	Takayuki Yasuda	Tokyo Horse Racing	1:36.0
2015	Nonkono Yume	Christophe Lemaire	Yukihiro Kato	Kazumasa Yamada	1:35.9
2016	Gold Dream	Yuga Kawada	Osamu Hirata	Katsumi Yoshida	1:35.8
2017	Sunrise Nova	Keita Tosaki	Hidetaka Otonashi	Takao Matsuoka	1:35.9
2018	Le Vent Se Leve	Mirco Demuro	Kiyoshi Hagiwara	G1 Racing	1:35.0
2019	Wide Pharaoh	Yuichi Fukunaga	Katsuhiko Sumii	Masanobu Habata	1:35.5
2020	Cafe Pharoah	Damian Lane	Noriyuki Hori	Koichi Nishikawa	1:34.9
2021	Smasher	Ryusei Sakai	Tatsuya Yoshioka	Hidaka Breeders Union	1:34.4
2022	Peisha Es	Akira Sugawara	Kazuo Konishi	Naoto Kitajo	1:35.2
2023	Perriere	Christophe Lemaire	Mitsumasa Nakauchida	Yuji Hasegawa	1:35.0
2024	Ramjet	Kousei Miura	Shozo Sasaki	Koji Maeda	1:58.6
2025	Canal Beagle	Seinosuke Yoshimura	Yuta Sato	U Carrot Farm	1:56.8
2026	Silver Ratio	Mirai Iwata	Kenji Nonaka	Sunday Racing	1:57.5

^{a} Gold Tiara and I Am Actress were fillies

== See also ==
- Horse racing in Japan
- List of Japanese flat horse races
