= Horse racing in South Korea =

Horse racing in South Korea traces back to May 1898, when a foreign language institute run by the government included a donkey race in its athletic rally. However, this type of racing was sponsored for entertainment purposes only. No betting was conducted. It was in the 1920s that 'modern' horse racing involving a betting system made its debut. In 1922, the Chosun Racing Club, the nation's first-ever authorized horse racing club, was established to make horse racing more systematic and better organized. In 1923, the pari-mutuel betting system was officially adopted for the first time in Korea. The Sinseol-dong racecourse opened in 1928 and incorporated racing clubs were allowed to have their own racecourses.

Finally, in 1933, a Japanese decree on horse racing was promulgated. Under the decree, only incorporated racing clubs were entitled to conduct horse racing. The Chosun Horse Racing Authority was also established in 1933 to coordinate and control incorporated racing clubs across the nation and ensure consistency in their administration. A racetrack named after the one in Florida, Hialeah, was established by the Japanese in Busan. The location was later used as a U.S. military base, Camp Hialeah, but retained the oval shape of a racetrack. It has since been returned to the Republic of Korea.

In 1945, the Chosun Horse Affairs Authority was renamed the Korea Racing Authority, and efforts were made to restore the national identity in horse racing. However, the Korean War which broke out in 1950 resulted in great turmoil for Korean society, thus undermining the development of horse racing. Worse yet, during the three-year war, racecourses were requisitioned for military training and horse racing came to an abrupt halt.

To keep the tradition of horse racing alive, the Korea Racing Authority worked out a plan to reestablish the racecourse at Ttuksom in Seoul. The construction, which began during the war, was completed in May 1954. With its dedication, horse racing resumed, and the newly constructed Ttksom racecourse served as the hub of Korean horse racing until it was relocated to the modern racecourse in Gwacheon in 1989.

Pari-mutuel bets were tallied manually until 1984. The inefficient management of the pari-mutuel betting system was a major stumbling block to broadening the fan base. To overcome this fundamental obstacle, the computerized pari-mutuel betting system was established in 1984, and at the same time, horse racing came to be televised in color, both on & off-course. These two measures played a decisive role in boosting attendance and turnover. For instance in 1984, the turnover and attendance increased by 67% and 58%, respectively, from the previous year.

To form a link in the chain of the program to make the most of the Olympic facilities, the government designated the KRA as the organization exclusively responsible for providing the Olympic Equestrian Park. Accordingly, the KRA secured 280 acres (1.1 km^{2}) of the land in Gwacheon area on the southern outskirts of Seoul and began its construction in 1984 till 1988. After the Olympics, the Park was converted into racing facilities named Seoul Race Park, and the first race was held on September 1, 1989. With the opening of the Seoul Race Park, the 36-year-long era of the Ttuksom Racecourse came to an end and the nation's horse racing continued to make great strides.

As part of the efforts to preserve the ponies native to Jeju Island, which has been designated as Natural Monument No. 347, the KRA began the construction of the 180-acre (0.7 km^{2}) Jeju Racecourse at the foot of Mount Halla in October 1987. Three years later in October 1990, the Racecourse opened for pony racing.

As an effort to raise racing quality and promote horseracing nationwide, the KRA started to construct the new thoroughbred racecourse in Busan, the second-largest city in South Korea. The racecourse opened in September 2005. The growth of Korean racing and KRA's internationalization efforts have drawn international attention since the beginning of the 2000s. Led by this, in October 2002, the Asian Racing Federation decided to designate South Korea as the host of the 30th Asian Racing Conference in May 2005. Also, in June 2004, the International Cataloguing Standards Committee included Korea as one of the Part III countries and decided to add seven South Korean Grade Races to the Blue Book list starting from 2005.
