= LetsRun Park Busan–Gyeongnam =

Horse racing venue in South Korea

Coordinates: 35°09′18.01″N 128°52′31.9″E

LetsRun Park Busan–Gyeongnam 렛츠런파크 부산경남
- Location: Beombang-dong 152; Gangseo-gu Busan / Suga-dong Gimhae South Gyeongsang Province, South Korea (Straddling for two different cities by administrative divisions)
- Owned by: Korea Racing Authority
- Date opened: 2005
- Course type: Thoroughbred - Flat racing
- Notable races: Korean Oaks (GII)

LetsRun Park Busan–Gyeongnam, also known as Busan–Gyeongnam Horse Racing Park (Korean: 부산경남경마공원; Hanja: 釜山慶南競馬公園) is the largest hippodrome in Gimhae and Busan, South Korea. It opened in 2005 and is operated by Korea Racing Authority (KRA).

== Notable races ==
Month	Race	Distance	Age/Sex
Grade II
Apr.	KRA Cup Mile	Dirt 1600m	Korean 3yo c&f
Aug.	Korean Oaks	Dirt 1800m	Korean 3yo f
Grade III
Aug.	Busan Mayors Trophy	2000m	Mixed 2yo +
Sep.	Owner's Cup	2000m	Korean 2yo +
Nov.	Gyeongnam Governor's Cup	2000m	Mixed 2yo + f

== Popular culture ==
LetsRun Park Busan–Gyeongnam was used as the main filming location in episode 126 of the South Korean variety show Running Man filmed in 2012.
