= Korea Racing Authority =

Coordinates: 37°26′39″N 127°00′40″E

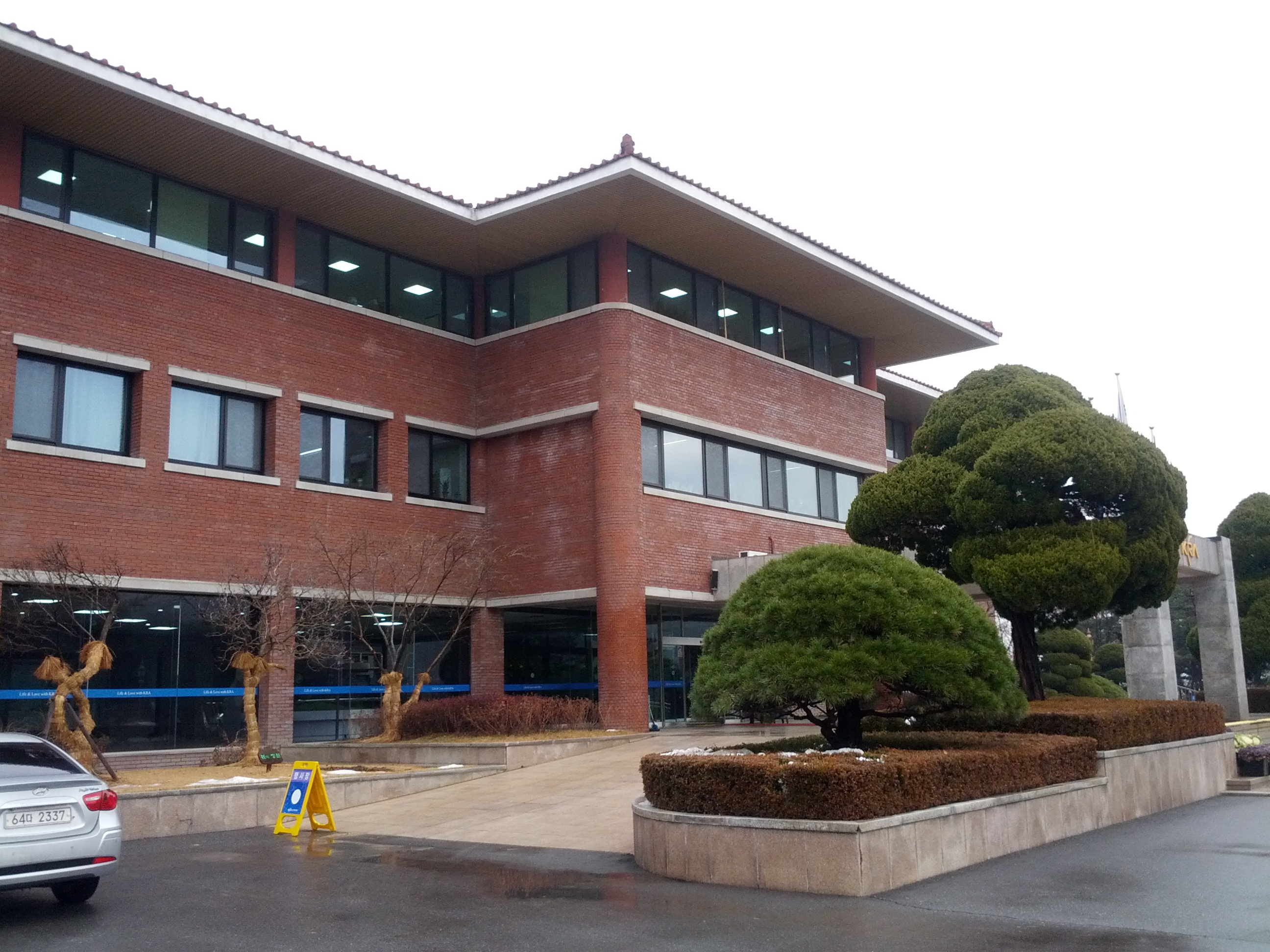
Korea Racing Authority building

Korea Racing Authority (Korean: 한국마사회; Hanja: 韓國馬事會, KRA) is a public company established to manage the racehorse breeding industry in South Korea.

It was founded in 1922 as the Chosun Horse Racing Club (Korean: 조선경마구락부), and was later renamed.

== Facilities ==
- LetsRun Park (racecourse and park)
  - LetsRun Park Seoul
  - LetsRun Park Busan–Gyeongnam
  - LetsRun Park Jeju
- LetsRun Farm
  - Wondand Farm
  - LetsRun Jeju
  - LetsRun Jangsu
- Museum
  - Korea Racing Authority Equine Museum
- Off-track betting
  - LetsRun CCC
