= LetsRun Park Seoul =

Thoroughbred racetrack in Gwacheon, Gyeonggu-do, South Korea

Coordinates: 37°26′49″N 127°00′56″E

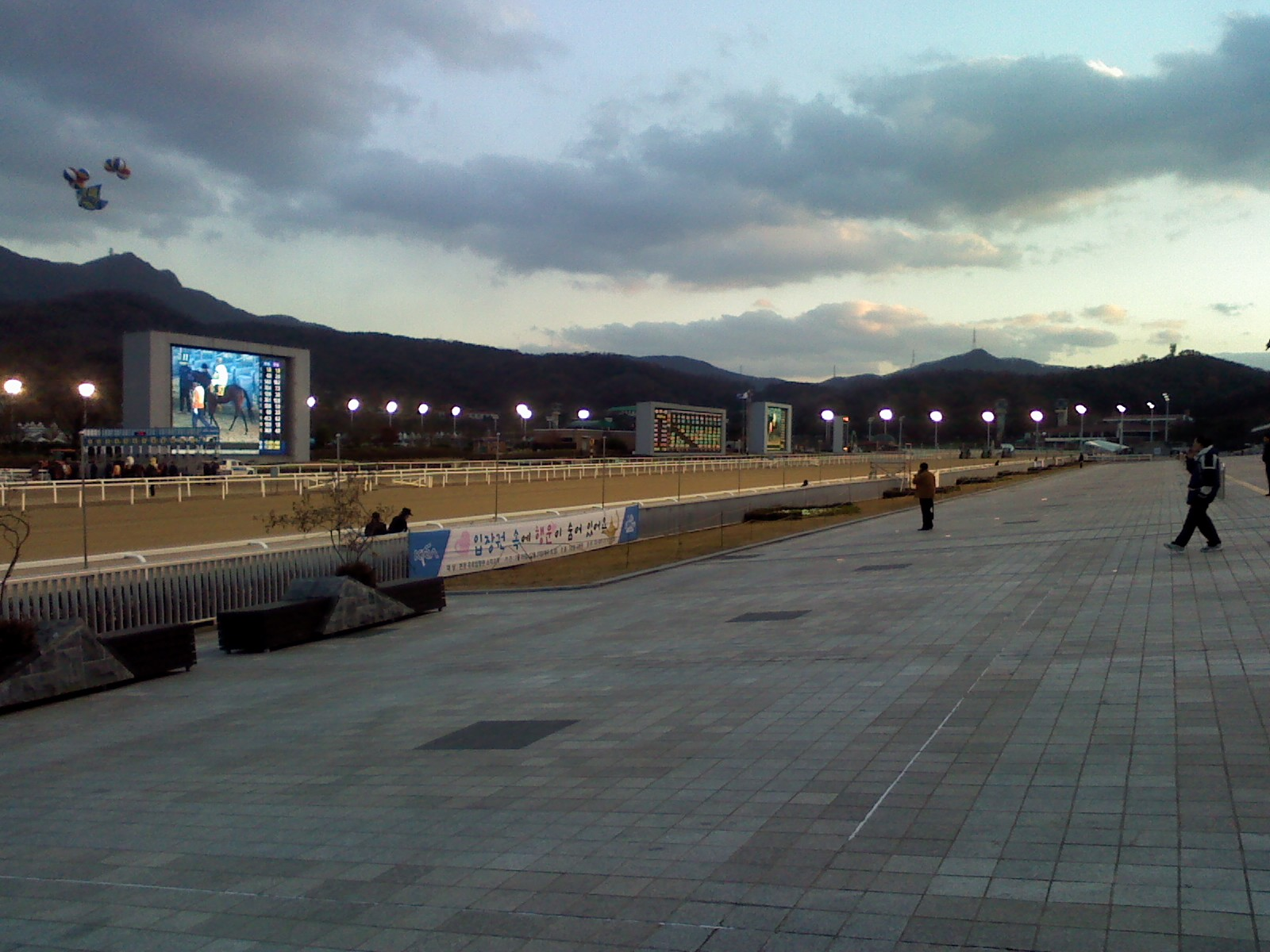
- Interactive map of LetsRun Park Seoul
- Location: Gwacheon, South Korea
- Owned by: Korea Racing Authority
- Date opened: 1 September 1989
- Course type: Left

LetsRun Park Seoul, also known as Seoul Race Park or Seoul Racecourse Park, is a 40,000 capacity Korean thoroughbred racetrack in Gwacheon, South Korea. It is host to many of Korea's most valuable thoroughbred horse races including the Korea Cup and Grand Prix. LetsRun Park Seoul is located next to Seoul Racecourse Park Station on Line 4 of the Seoul Metropolitan Subway. It is operated by the Korea Racing Authority (KRA).

== History ==
The current site at Gwacheon is the third home of LetsRun Park Seoul. The first was at a track in Sinseol-dong, Dongdaemun District, which was in operation from the early 1920s until just after the Korean War. Following the closure of the Sinseol-dong track, a new racetrack was constructed at Ttukseom, on the north bank of the Han River In February 1983, after South Korea was awarded the 1988 Summer Olympics, the KRA was given the task of organising the equestrian events. The Ttukseom Racetrack was inadequate; the KRA acquired a new site south of Seoul in Gwacheon Gyeonggi-do, where the equestrian (except the individual-jumping final) and the riding portion of the modern pentathlon events were held. After the Olympics, the KRA turned the site into a racetrack.

This is where the headquarters of the Korean Horse Society is located. Gyeongseong Racecourse, which opened in Yongdujeong [2], Gyeongseong-bu, on September 20, 1928, started as a racecourse. Construction began in 1984 to host the equestrian events of the 1986 Asian Games in Seoul and the Seoul Olympics in 1988, and officially opened on September 1, 1989. Construction began in 1984 and moved to 1989. Until 1998, it was called 'Seoul Racecourse' and then changed to the current name.

== Present ==
The first race at the new LetsRun Park Seoul was held on 1 September 1989. The track can accommodate more than 80,000 spectators; in 2003 a second grandstand, "Luckyville", was opened alongside the existing "Happyville". Races are run on an oval artificial sand-based track with a two-furlong home straight.

As of 2011 live thoroughbred racing takes place on Saturdays and Sundays all year, with 12 races each Saturday and 11 each Sunday. On race day, races are also simulcast from the pony-racing track on Jeju Island and the thoroughbred track at Busan-Gyeongnam. Major races at the LetsRun Park Seoul include the Korean Derby in May, the Minister of Agriculture Cup in October, the President's Cup in November and the season-ending Grand Prix in December.

In 2007, the Korean-bred J.S. Hold won the Korean Triple Crown (the Ttukseom Cup, the Korean Derby and the Minister's Cup) at LetsRun Park Seoul. In 2008 the Ttukseom Cup was replaced as the first leg of the Triple Crown by the KRA Cup Mile, which is run at Busan-Gyeongnam Race Park on the first Sunday in April.

In 2009 the champion jockey at LetsRun Park Seoul was Park Tae Jong, who also holds the record for most wins in Korean racing history. The 2009 Korean Derby was won by a filly, Sangseung Ilro, who had previously won the KRA up Mile at Busan-Gyeongnam. At the end of each season, racing fans in Korea can vote for which horses they wish to take part in the traditional season-ending Grand Prix race. In 2009, the American-bred Dongbanui Gangja won the race for the second consecutive year.

== Racecourse ==
It consists of a 25m wide outer 1800m, an inner 1600m, and a 1000m auxiliary 400m sand track. They all look the same from the observation deck, but the velodrome structure has a 2.5% internal slope for the curved sections and 1.5% internal and external slopes for the straight sections.

The width from the 2300m starting point to the finish line of the outer perimeter straight track is 30m. The goal is to maintain an average sand thickness of 7 cm.

== Notable races in 2026 ==
Month	Racename	Distance	Condition	IFHA The Blue Book 2026
International Grade II
Sep.	Korea Cup	Dirt 1800m	International 3yo+	Y
International Grade III
Sep.	Korea Sprint	Dirt 1200m	International 3yo+	Y
KOR Grade I
May.	Korean Derby	Dirt 1800m	Korean-bred 3yo c&f	N
Oct.	Presidents Cup	Dirt 2000m	Korean-bred 3yo+	Y
Dec.	Grand Prix	Dirt 2300m	3yo+	Y
KOR Grade II
Apr.	Ttukseom Cup	Dirt 1400m	3yo+	Y
May.	SROA Chairman's Trophy	Dirt 1200m	3yo+	Y
Jun.	Minister’s Cup	Dirt 2000m	Korean-bred 3yo c&f	N
Jul.	KRA Cup Classic	Dirt 2000m	3yo+	Y
Nov.	Breeder's Cup Rookie	Dirt 1400m	Korean-bred 2yo c&f	N
KOR Grade III
Mar.	Herald Business Trophy	Dirt 2000m	3yo+	N
Apr.	SBS Sports Sprint	Dirt 1200m	3yo+	Y
Apr.	YTN Cup	Dirt 2000m	3yo+	N
Jun.	Gyeonggi Governor's Cup	Dirt 2000m	Korean-bred 3yo f	N
Sep.	Jeju Governor's Cup	Dirt 1400m	3yo+	N

== See also ==
- Racing in Korea
- Gwacheon
- Thoroughbred racing
