= Smart Falcon =

Japanese-bred Thoroughbred racehorse

Smart Falcon スマートファルコン
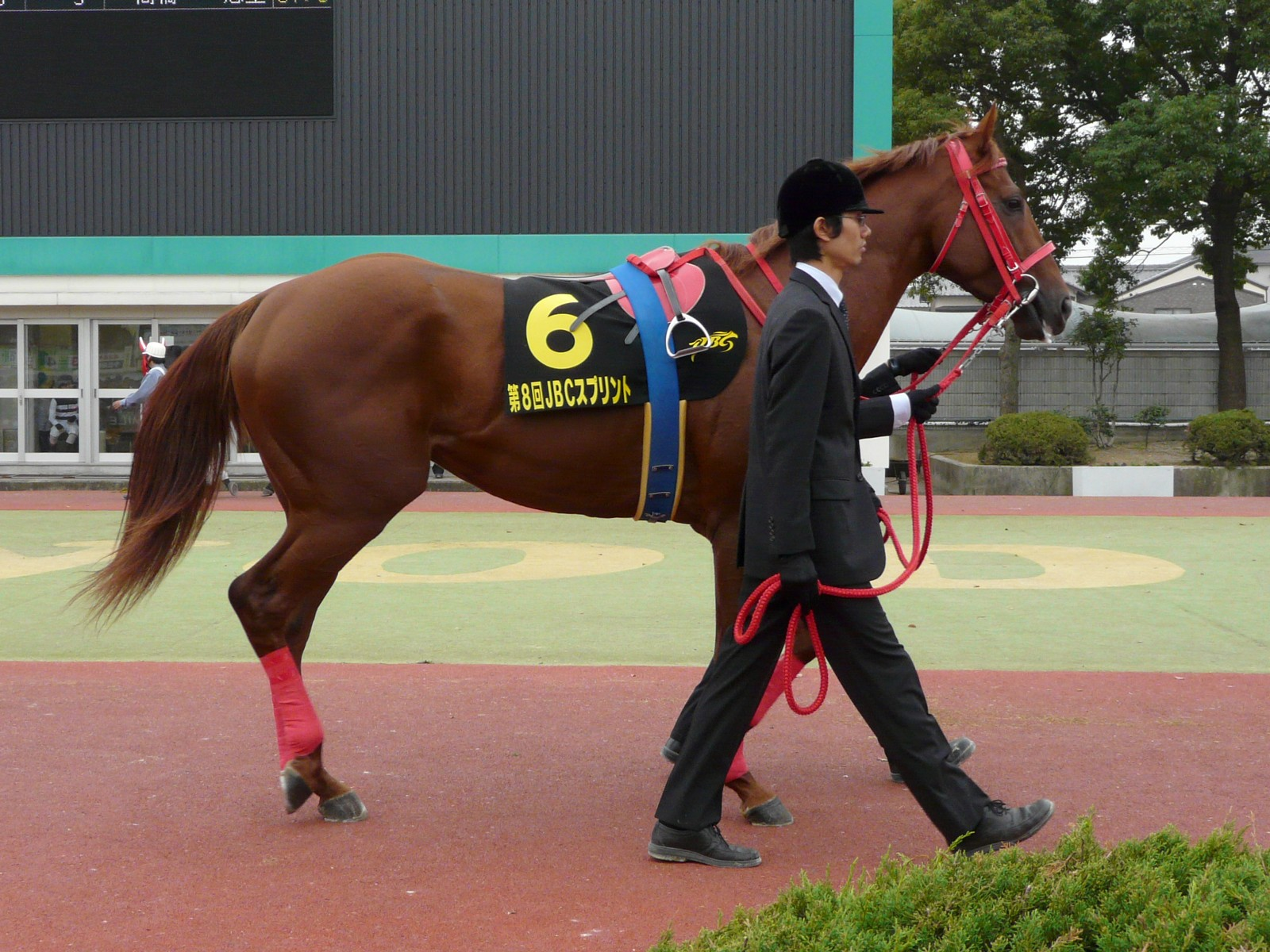
- Smart Falcon in 2008.
- Breed: Thoroughbred
- Sire: Gold Allure
- Grandsire: Sunday Silence
- Dam: Keishu Herb
- Damsire: Mississipian
- Sex: Stallion
- Foaled: April 4, 2005 (age 21)
- Country: Japan
- Color: Chestnut
- Breeder: Okada Stud
- Owner: Tohru Okawa
- Racing colours
- Trainer: Yoshihiro Hatakeyama →Ken Kozaki
- Record: 34:23-4-1; JRA: 8:4-1-0; NAR: 25:19-3-1; UAE: 1:0-0-0
- Earnings: ¥990,736,000; JRA: ¥60,486,000; NAR: ¥930,250,000

Major wins
- Tokyo Daishoten (2010, 2011); JBC Classic (2010, 2011); Teio Sho (2011); Kawasaki Kinen (2012)

Awards
- NAR Grand Prix Dirt Grade Race Special Award (2010, 2011)
- Last updated on June 9, 2025

Smart Falcon (Japanese: スマートファルコン, Hepburn: Sumāto Farukon; foaled April 4, 2005) is a retired Japanese Thoroughbred racehorse and active sire. Dubbed the "Runner of the Dirt", his major wins include the 2010 and 2011 JBC Classic and Tokyo Daishoten, the 2011 Teio Sho, and the 2012 Kawasaki Kinen. His name derives from the owner's eponym ("Smart") and the bird of the same name.

He is the half brother of World Cleek, who also won the Tokyo Daishoten in 1999.

== Racing career ==
=== 2007: two-year old season ===
Smart Falcon debuted on October 28, 2007, at a debut race for 2 year olds held at Tokyo Racecourse with Yasunari Iwata as his jockey and was the most favored. After handily winning the race, he won his second victory at an allowance race with Hiroki Goto after coming in second in another allowance race.

=== 2008: three-year old season ===
Smart Falcon started the season off with his first turf race, the Junior Cup. He was the fifth favored to win, but managed to win the race and joined the Classics race. However, his bid to the Classics race proved to be unsuccessful, following his losses at the Kyodo Tsushin Hai, Arlington Cup, and ultimately finishing last at the Satsuki Shō. Following this defeat, the horse was moved from Yoshihiro Hatakeyama's stable at the Miho Training Center to Ken Kozaki's stable in Ritto Training Center; with the horse being sent out to pasture at Greenwood to recuperate in the meantime.

After moving to the Kozaki stable, the horse returned to the dirt, coming in second at the Japan Dirt Derby behind Success Brocken, showing great potential on the dirt. Following this, he was entered in to his first race with older horses, the KBC Hai, where he won the race after being the front runner for the entire race. This would be the final JRA race for this horse. On October 7, the horse won his first graded race, the Hakusan Daishoten held at Kanazawa Racecourse, where he also took the lead after the start and held on to it the entire time. This win marked the 1st graded race victory for both trainer Kozaki as well as for any progenies of Gold Allure.

His next race, the JpnI Japan Breeding Farms' Cup Sprint, saw him finishing second behind Bamboo Ere. After this race, the horse had the option to enter either the Japan Cup Dirt or the Urawa Kinen, before choosing the latter. The horse won the Urawa Kinen handily in spite of the sloppy track, beating the second place horse by a 7-length lead. As a result of his performances, the horse became by far the most favored to win in the Hyogo Gold Trophy, with the parimutuel odds for the horse reaching 1.0. In that race, the horse did not start well and was placed in the rear of the pack, but ultimately won the race with a 4-length lead, marking his third graded race victory.

=== 2009: four-year old season ===
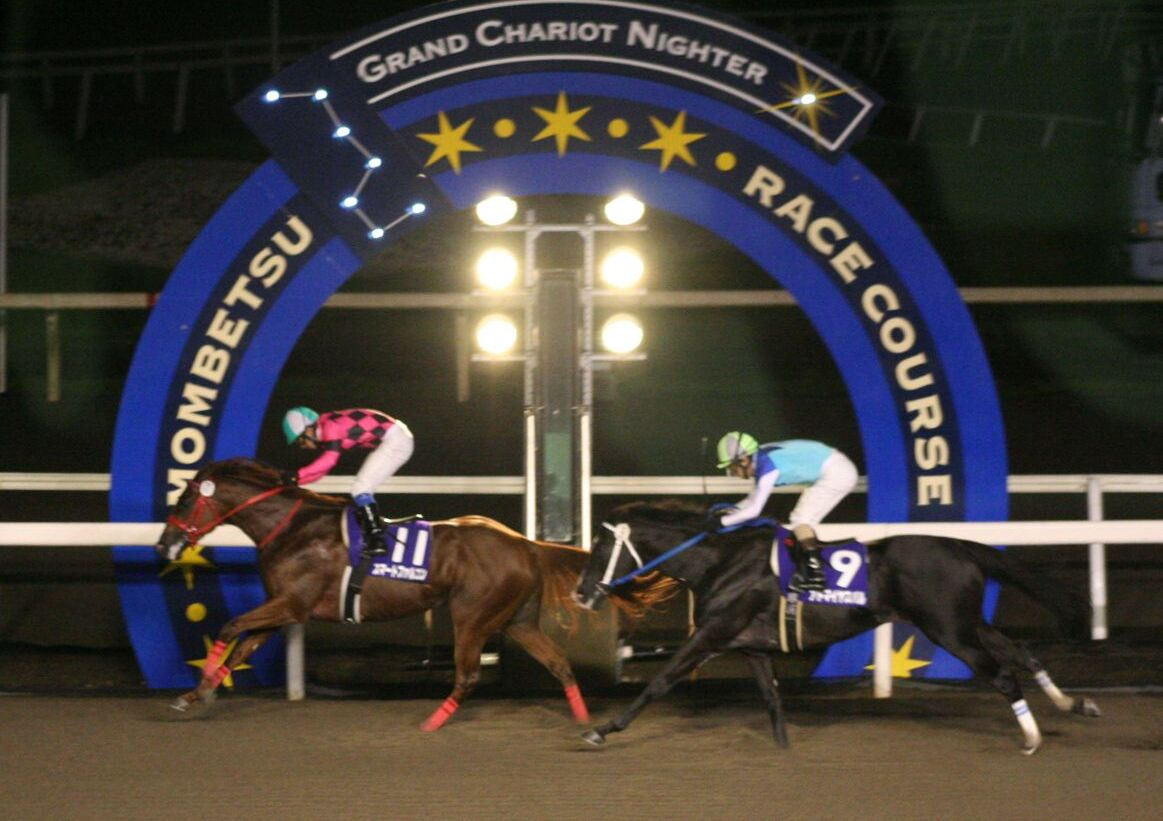
The 21st Breeders' Gold Cup

Smart Falcon started the 2009 season off with the Saga Kinen held on February 11 at Saga Racecourse. He won the race as the front-runner with a 4-length lead with the odds at 1.1. He also won his next race, the Nagoya Daishoten, where he took the lead from an outside start and won the race with a half-length lead. He also won the Kakitsubata Kinen held on May 4, where the horse took the lead early on and gained even further in the final stretch, beating second place Tosen Bright by 5-lengths. On the Sakitama Hai held at May 27, the horse ran most of the race at the second or third of the pack before passing the front-runner at around the fourth corner, winning the race with a length and a half lead against Bamboo Ere. On the Mercury Cup held on July 20, the horse was placed third in the pack before attempting to take the lead from front-runner Makoto Sparviero only to be unsuccessful. The race finished with Makoto Sparviero beating Smart Falcon by four-lengths, breaking his six race winning streak. Later, at the Breeders' Gold Cup, he ran second for most of the race before taking the lead at the final stretch and won the race at a record 02:02.2. After taking a break, he contested the Urawa Kinen on November 25. He was the front runner in that race as usual, but lost momentum at the final stretch and finished 7th, making it the first time the horse was unable to finish within the top five at a dirt race.

=== 2010: five-year old season ===
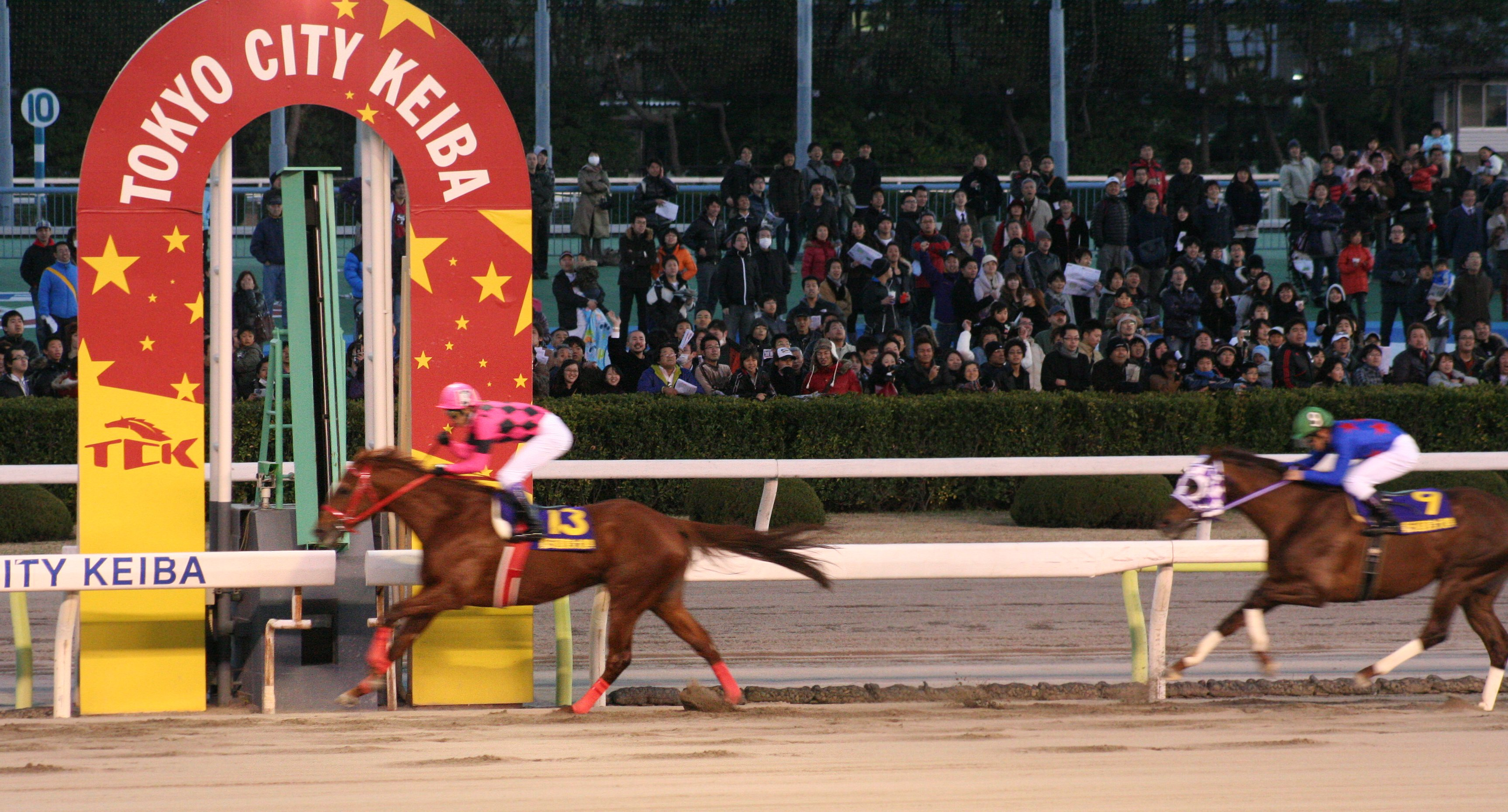
The 56th Tokyo Daishoten

Smart Falcon's first race of the season was the Kakitsubata Kinen held on May 3, where the horse quickly took the lead and held on to it throughout the race, marking his 9th graded race victory. Later, at the Sakitama Hai on May 26, the horse ran third before taking the lead at the back stretch and holding on to the lead for the rest of the race, marking his 10th graded race victory. On June 30, Smart Falcon entered his first JpnI race since the JBC Sprint in 2008, the Teio Sho, where he was the third favored to win, but finished 6th behind Furioso. As Iwata had suffered an unrelated riding accident prior to this, Yutaka Take took over jockey duty for the horse's next race, the Nippon TV Hai on September 23. At the race, the horse finished third despite the winning horse, Furioso, had 2 kilograms more in weight to carry for that race. At the Japan Breeding Farms' Cup Classic held on November 3, the horse was ridden once again by Take, and the horse took the lead from the outside and held on to it without much issues, before gaining even more lead on the final stretch even as the other horses struggled, before marking his first GI victory with a 7-length lead. His next race, the Urawa Kinen, saw Smart Falcon win the race with a 6-length lead with the horse never relinquishing the lead, and Take never having to use his crop. In the final race of the year, the Tokyo Daishōten, after taking the lead from Furioso early on the horse gained more momentum at around the 4th corner, finishing the race by beating the course record by 1.7 seconds and also beating the previous Japanese record held by Wonder Speed by 0.6 seconds.

=== 2011: six-year old season ===
Smart Falcon started the season off with the Diolite Kinen on May 2. In that race, the horse took the lead from the start and held on to it as the front runner for the entire race, before winning the race with an 8-length lead. With his 14th graded race victory, this race marked him becoming the horse with the most graded wins in JRA history, a title previously held by Vermilion. Smart Falcon also won the Teio Sho on June 29, where he took the lead and never let the pack come close to him, crushing 2nd place Espoir City by 9 lengths. On the Nippon TV Hai in September 23, he also won the race as the front runner by taking the lead early on and finishing with a 4 length lead. In the JBC Classic on November 3, the horse took the lead early on and won the race a second time with a 1 length lead against Transcend. At the Tokyo Daishoten, the final race of the year, Smart Falcon once again took the lead and held on to it in to the final stretch, only for Wonder Acute to strongly contest the lead; with Smart Falcon barely staving off Wonder Acute by a nose in a photo finish.

=== 2012: seven-year old season ===
Smart Falcon started the year off with the Kawasaki Kinen on January 25. After taking the lead with a good start, he gained the lead on the final stretch, finishing the race at 2:10.7 with a 4-length lead, and beating Vermilion's course records by 2 seconds. Following this race, Smart Falcon was invited to race in the 2012 Dubai World Cup with Transcend and Eishin Flash. Smart Falcon entered the race, but finished at 10th place. Smart Falcon skipped the year's Teio Sho as the horse wasn't recovering well enough. The horse was then sent to pasture before returning to the stable in August for a return, only for the horse to develop tenosynovitis in his hock, resulting in the horse to be retired from racing to stand stud at Shadai Stallion Station.

His total of 19 graded flat race wins was the highest number of wins in Japan until Katsugeki Kitokito broke the record in 2021.

== Racing statistics ==
The following racing statistics are based on information available on JBIS-Search and netkeiba.

Date	Racecourse	Race	Grade	Distance (Condition)	Runner	BK	PP	Odds	Finished	Time	Margins	Jockey	Winner（Runner-up）
2007.10.28	Tokyo	2YO Debut Race		Dirt 1600m (Sloppy)	14	3	3	2.9 (1)	1st	1:39.1	-0.2	Yasunari Iwata	(Siberian Ken)
11.25	Tokyo	2YO Allowance (1 Win)		Dirt 1600m (Fast)	13	2	2	4.3 (3)	2nd	1:39.1	0.4	Yasunari Iwata	Ceres Hunt
12.16	Nakayama	2YO Allowance (1 Win)		Dirt 1800m (Fast)	15	3	3	4.8 (5)	1st	1:55.6	-0.1	Hiroki Goto	(Rush Street)
2008. 1. 6	Nakayama	Junior Cup	OP	Turf 1600m（Firm）	13	6	8	12.2 (5)	1st	1:34.1	-0.1	Norihiro Yokoyama	(Oro Meister)
2.11	Tokyo	Kyodo Tsushin Hai	GIII	Turf 1800m（Firm）	16	6	12	6.7 (2)	7th	1:48.5	0.9	Norihiro Yokoyama	Shonan Alba
3. 1	Hanshin	Arlington Cup	GIII	Turf 1600m（Firm）	12	2	2	11.2 (4)	10th	1:35.7	1.1	Kenichi Ikezoe	Dantsu Kissui
4.20	Nakayama	Satsuki Shō	GI	Turf 2000m（Firm）	18	6	11	66.6 (17)	18th	2:04.1	2.4	Yuichi Fukunaga	Captain Thule
7. 9	Ohi	Japan Dirt Derby	JpnI	Dirt 2000m (Muddy)	15	4	8	5.7 (3)	2nd	2:05.1	0.6	Yasunari Iwata	Success Brocken
8.10	Kokura	KBC Hai	OP	Dirt 1700m (Fast)	15	8	14	3.3 (1)	1st	1:43.6	0.0	Yasunari Iwata	(Belmont Protea)
10. 7	Kanazawa	Hakusan Daishoten	JpnIII	Dirt 2100m (Sloppy)	11	8	11	1.5 (1)	1st	2:14.1	-0.5	Yasunari Iwata	(Yamato Marion)
11. 3	Sonoda	JBC Sprint	JpnI	Dirt 1400m (Fast)	12	45	6	5.7 (3)	2nd	1:25.8	0.2	Yasunari Iwata	Bamboo Ere
11.26	Urawa	Sai no Kuni Urawa Kinen	JpnII	Dirt 2000m (Sloppy)	11	1	1	1.6 (1)	1st	2:04.8	-1.3	Yasunari Iwata	(Ampersand)
12.25	Sonoda	Hyogo Gold Trophy	JpnIII	Dirt 1400m (Good)	12	5	6	1.0 (1)	1st	1:26.5	-0.7	Yasunari Iwata	(Al Dragon)
2009. 2.11	Saga	Saga Kinen	JpnIII	Dirt 2000m (Fast)	12	5	6	1.1 (1)	1st	2:07.4	-0.7	Yasunari Iwata	(Roll of the Dice)
3.25	Nagoya	Nagoya Daishoten	JpnIII	Dirt 1900m (Fast)	11	8	11	1.3 (1)	1st	2:01.8	-0.1	Yasunari Iwata	(Wonder Speed)
5. 4	Nagoya	Kakitsubata Kinen	JpnIII	Dirt 1400m (Fast)	12	2	2	1.0 (1)	1st	1:25.5	-1.0	Yasunari Iwata	(Tosen Bright)
5.27	Urawa	Sakitama Hai	JpnIII	Dirt 1400m (Fast)	12	5	5	1.2 (1)	1st	1:26.4	-0.2	Yasunari Iwata	(Bamboo Ere)
7.20	Morioka	Mercury Cup	JpnIII	Dirt 2000m (Fast)	13	4	4	1.1 (1)	2nd	2:04.6	0.6	Yasunari Iwata	Makoto Sparviero
8.13	Mombetsu	Breeders' Gold Cup	JpnII	Dirt 2000m (Sloppy)	15	6	11	2.2 (2)	1st	2:02.2	-0.2	Yasunari Iwata	(Admire Subaru)
11.25	Urawa	Urawa Kinen	JpnII	Dirt 2000m (Sloppy)	11	7	8	1.4 (1）	7th	2:10.0	2.9	Yasunari Iwata	Blue Lad
2010. 5. 3	Nagoya	Kakitsubata Kinen	JpnIII	Dirt 1400m (Fast)	12	4	4	2.3 (2)	1st	1:25.3	-0.3	Yasunari Iwata	(Suni)
5.26	Urawa	Sakitama Hai	JpnIII	Dirt 1400m (Good)	12	7	9	1.3 (1)	1st	1:26.2	-0.8	Yasunari Iwata	(Suni)
6.30	Ohi	Teio Sho	JpnI	Dirt 2000m (Good)	15	6	10	4.5 (3)	6th	2:04.8	1.4	Yasunari Iwata	Furioso
9.23	Funabashi	Nippon TV Hai	JpnII	Dirt 1800m (Good)	15	6	19	3.9 (3)	3rd	1:49.3	0.5	Yutaka Take	Furioso
11. 3	Funabashi	JBC Classic	JpnI	Dirt 1800m (Fast)	13	8	13	16.1 (4)	1st	1:49.9	-1.3	Yutaka Take	(Furioso)
11.24	Urawa	Urawa Kinen	JpnII	Dirt 2000m (Good)	10	6	7	1.1 (1)	1st	2:05.8	-1.2	Yutaka Take	(Voluntas)
12.29	Ohi	Tokyo Daishōten	JpnI	Dirt 2000m (Fast)	14	8	13	2.5 (1)	1st	2:00.4	-0.3	Yutaka Take	(Furioso)
2011. 5. 2	Funabashi	Diolite Kinen	JpnII	Dirt 2400m (Fast)	14	4	5	1.0 (1)	1st	2:33.2	-1.6	Yutaka Take	(Kakitsubata Royal)
6.29	Ohi	Teio Sho	JpnI	Dirt 2000m (Fast)	11	6	6	1.2 (1)	1st	2:01.1	-1.8	Yutaka Take	(Espoir City)
9.23	Funabashi	Nippon TV Hai	JpnII	Dirt 1800m (Sloppy)	12	8	12	1.0 (1)	1st	1:50.6	-0.7	Yutaka Take	(Chryso)
11. 3	Ohi	JBC Classic	JpnI	Dirt 2000m (Fast)	12	7	19	1.2 (1)	1st	2:01.8	-0.2	Yutaka Take	(Transcend)
12.29	Ohi	Tokyo Daishōten	GI	Dirt 2000m (Fast)	12	8	12	1.0 (1)	1st	2:01.8	0.0	Yutaka Take	(Wonder Acute)
2012. 1.25	Kawasaki	Kawasaki Kinen	JpnI	Dirt 2100m (Muddy)	12	5	5	1.1 (1)	1st	2:10.7	-0.8	Yutaka Take	(Renforcer)
3.31	Meydan	Dubai World Cup	GI	Dirt 2000m (Fast)	13		5	(2)	10th			Yutaka Take	Monterosso

== Stud career ==
Smart Falcon began his stud career from 2013, covering 164 mares with a service fee of 600,000JPY. The horse covered 135 and 141 mares in subsequent seasons, before his first crops debuted in 2016. That April, Siena Tokon became the first progeny to win a race after he won the Dream Challenge race in Urawa. That same year, Beach Malika became the first progeny to win a JRA race following her debut race win at Sapporo Racecourse. Smart Falcon covered a 181 mares in 2016.

In April 2017, Star Lane became the first progeny to win a graded race following her win at the Saga Le Printemps Sho, and Dan Stone Lien won the Hayate Sprint in Morioka that same year. However, he couldn't produce a successful progeny for the second year season, and only covered 101 mares in 2017. On December 3, 2017, Smart Falcon was moved from the Shadai Stallion Station to the Lex Stud. The number of mare covered in 2018 dropped to 64.

On January 24, 2021, Auvergne won the Tokai Stakes, marking the first time a progeny won a JRA graded race.

On May 1, 2024, Shamal won the Kashiwa Kinen, marking the first time a progeny won a GI/JpnI race.

=== Notable progeny ===
c = colt, f = filly

bold = grade 1 stakes

**Foaled**	**Name**	**Sex**	**Major Wins**
2016	Auvergne	c	Tokai Stakes, Heian Stakes
2018	Shamal	c	Tokyo Sprint, Summer Champion, TeleTama Hai Oval Sprint, Kurofune Sho (three times), **Kashiwa Kinen** (twice), **Sakitama Hai**
2023	Best Green	c	Hokkaido Sprint Cup

== In popular culture ==
An anthropomorphized version of Smart Falcon appears as a character in the Japanese multimedia franchise Umamusume: Pretty Derby, voiced by Hitomi Ōwada. She is depicted as a lively and dedicated idol with a mastery in dirt racing, referencing her real-life counterpart's success on such tracks, and wants to make it popular to generate publicity for her idol performances. Her career mode in the video game is analogous to the real Smart Falcon as it almost exclusively consists of dirt races except for the Satsuki Shō, where victory is not required because of her disadvantage in turf races and the actual horse's poor finish there.

== Pedigree ==
Pedigree of Smart Falcon, chestnut stallion, 2005
Sire Gold Allure 1999 ch.	Sunday Silence; 1986 br.	Halo	Hail to Reason
Sire Gold Allure 1999 ch.	Sunday Silence; 1986 br.	Halo	Cosmah
Sire Gold Allure 1999 ch.	Sunday Silence; 1986 br.	Wishing Well	Understanding
Sire Gold Allure 1999 ch.	Sunday Silence; 1986 br.	Wishing Well	Mountain Flower
Sire Gold Allure 1999 ch.	Nikiya; 1993 b.	Nureyev	Northern Dancer
Sire Gold Allure 1999 ch.	Nikiya; 1993 b.	Nureyev	Special
Sire Gold Allure 1999 ch.	Nikiya; 1993 b.	Reluctant Guest	Hostage
Sire Gold Allure 1999 ch.	Nikiya; 1993 b.	Reluctant Guest	Vaguely Royal
Dam Keishu Herb 1988 gr.	Mississipian; 1971 b.	Vaguely Noble	Vienna
Dam Keishu Herb 1988 gr.	Mississipian; 1971 b.	Vaguely Noble	Noble Lassie
Dam Keishu Herb 1988 gr.	Mississipian; 1971 b.	Gazala	Dark Star
Dam Keishu Herb 1988 gr.	Mississipian; 1971 b.	Gazala	Belle Angevine
Dam Keishu Herb 1988 gr.	Kyoei Shirayuki; 1980 gr.	Crowned Prince	Raise a Native
Dam Keishu Herb 1988 gr.	Kyoei Shirayuki; 1980 gr.	Crowned Prince	Gay Hostess
Dam Keishu Herb 1988 gr.	Kyoei Shirayuki; 1980 gr.	Ariaan	Silver Shark
Dam Keishu Herb 1988 gr.	Kyoei Shirayuki; 1980 gr.	Ariaan	Nucciolina
