= Furioso (Japanese horse) =

Japanese Thoroughbred racehorse

Furioso フリオーソ
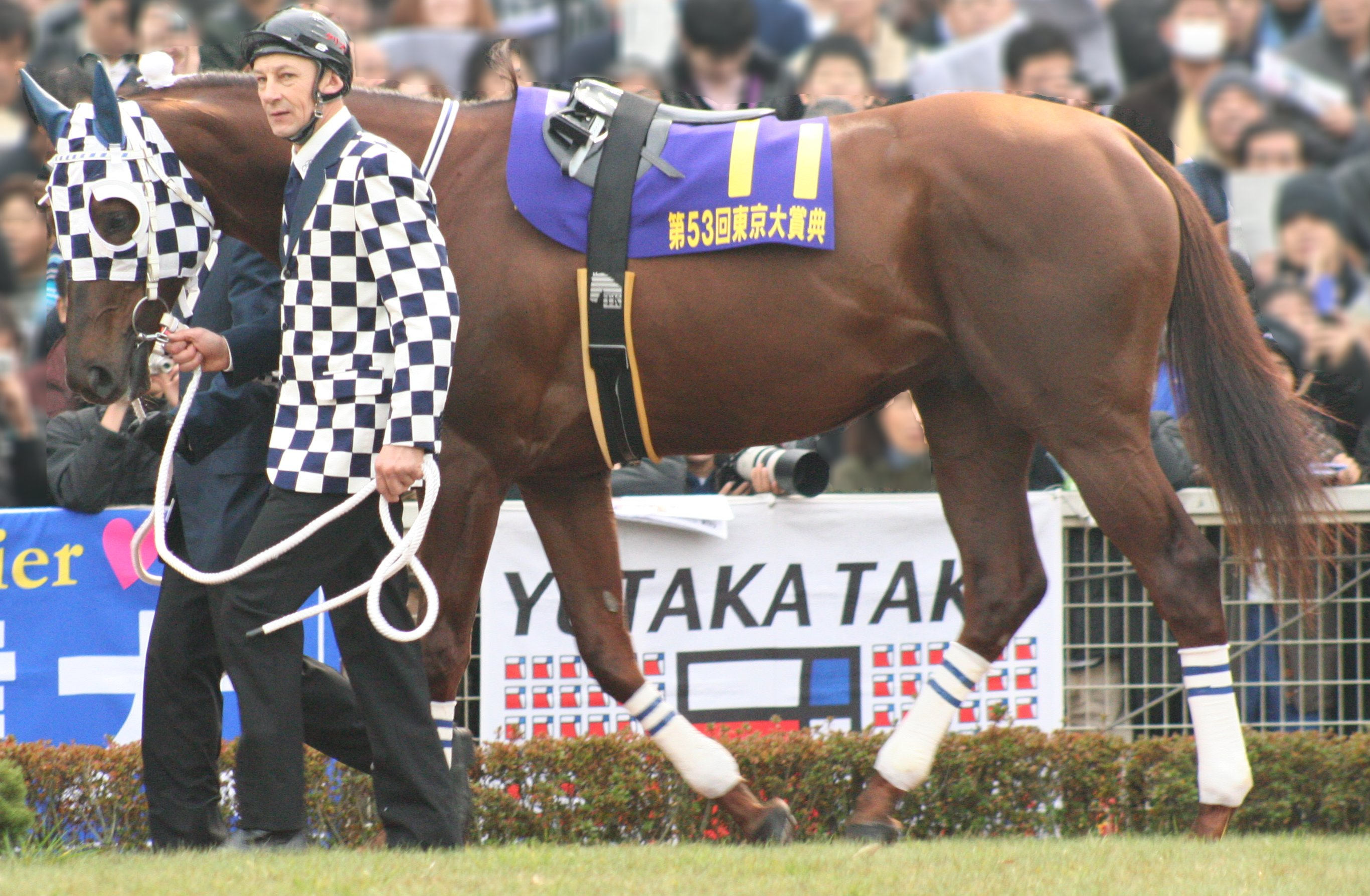
- Furioso at the 2007 Tokyo Daishōten.
- Breed: Thoroughbred
- Sire: Brian's Time (USA)
- Grandsire: Roberto (USA)
- Dam: Fursa (USA)
- Damsire: Mr. Prospector (USA)
- Sex: Stallion
- Foaled: May 1, 2004 (age 22)
- Country: Japan
- Color: Chestnut
- Breeder: Hashimoto Farm
- Owner: Darley Japan Farm Co. Ltd.
- Racing colors
- Trainer: Masayuki Kawashima
- Jockey: Hiroyuki Uchida; Tadanari Konno; Keita Tosaki
- Record: 39: 11-14-2
- Earnings: ¥845,446,000

Major wins
- Zen-Nippon Nisai Yushun (2006); Japan Dirt Classic (2007); Diolite Kinen (2008, 2009); Teio Sho (2008, 2010); Nippon TV Hai (2010); Kawasaki Kinen (2011); Kashiwa Kinen (2011)

Awards
- NAR Horse of the Year (2007, 2008, 2010, 2011); NAR Best 2-Year-Old Colt or Filly (2006); NAR Best 3-Year-Old Colt or Filly (2007); NAR Best Older Horse or Mare (2008, 2009, 2010); NAR Best Older Colt or Horse (2011, 2012)

Furioso (Japanese: フリオーソ, Hepburn: Furiōso, foaled 1 May 2004) is a retired Japanese Thoroughbred racehorse who is known for his victories in domestic races. Along with his many wins, he also had multiple awards from the National Association of Racing.

== Background ==
Furioso was foaled on May 1, 2004 by Fursa. He was sired by Brian's Time, an American-bred racehorse who also sired other notable Japanese racehorses such as Narita Brian, Mayano Top Gun, and Tanino Gimlet. Both his grandsire (Roberto) and damsire (Mr. Prospector), were successful and influential sires.

His name came from an Italian musical term of furioso, which means enthusiastically or impetuously.

== Racing career ==
=== 2006: two-year-old season ===
Furioso started his career with a good start on the dirt track with two wins from two starts at the Funabashi Racecourse and jockeyed by Takayuki Ishizaki. On his third race at the Heiwa Sho, Furioso who came as the first favourite of the race, briefly took an early lead but eventually lost the race when Kinno Raicho surged past him to win by a nose on a sloppy track that day. Then, he would run at the Zen-Nippon Nisai Yushun race and started from gate 12 with a new jockey, Hiroyuki Uchida. When the race started, Furioso tracked the leaders from a good position, caught the leading favourite, Tropical Light in the straight and won the race by two lengths ahead. This was the first graded stakes win for Furioso and also the 500th career win for Uchida as a jockey. Due to his promising performances, he was selected as the National Association of Racing (NAR) best two-year-old colt or filly of the year.

=== 2007: three-year-old season ===
At the start of the year, Masayuki sent him for two turf races in which he placed in lowly seventh and 11th in Kyodo Tsushin Hai and Spring Stakes respectively. Two months later, he returned to dirt track and ran at the Haneda Hai alongside Uchida. On the race, he ran smoothly and finished in third place after a furious final straight contest behind the winner Top Sabaton and Ampersand, losing to the latter just by a neck. A month later, he competed in the second leg of the three-year-old races exclusive on dirt, the Tokyo Derby and would start from gate 14. During the race, he stuck mostly in the middle pack before stretching his legs on the final bend. He accelerated well but only finished in second place in the end after Ampersand nicked the win from him on the line by a neck margin. Next, he completed the third leg of the three-year-old dirt exclusive by participating in the Japan Dirt Derby, this time with another jockey, Tadanari Konno.As the third favourite, he tracked the field down in the second position before taking the lead on the backstretch and pulling away from the rest of the field. Furioso won the final leg of the dirt classic by two and a-half- lengths over Ampersand. When the campaign restart at autumn, Furioso joined his first ever senior dirt races which was the JBC Classic with Uchida on his saddle. The field for this race included few big name horses such as Blue Concorde, Sunrise Bacchus, Seeking the Dia and Vermilion. Furioso finished in second place for this race, left out four lengths behind Vermilion who was ridden by Yutaka Take. In the subsequent Japan Cup Dirt, he finished outside the podium for the first time on dirt track so far which was in tenth, almost three seconds behind Vermilion. In December, he finished the year with a run at the Tokyo Daishoten with Konno as his jockey again since the win at the Japan Dirt Derby. For the second time after three starts, he finished in second place by four lengths behind the winner, Vermilion where he surpassed Furioso at the final corner before the straight and never looked back until the line. Despite a shaky finish to the season, a strong early dirt classic campaign was enough to earn him the NAR horse of the year for the season.

=== 2008: four-year-old season ===
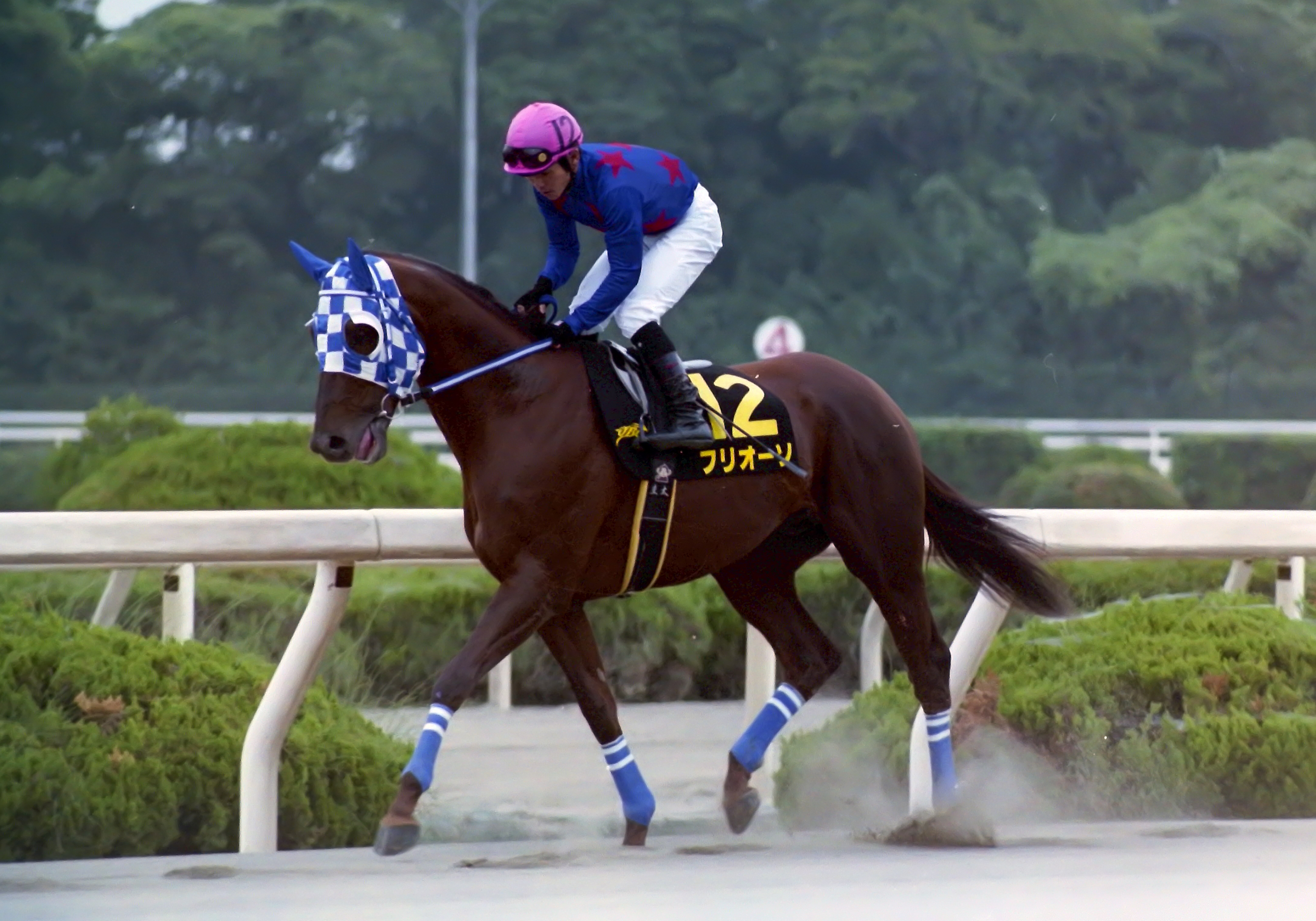
Furioso at the 2008 JBC Classic

For the first start of the year, Furioso was being registered to run in the Kawasaki Kinen as a second favourite behind Vermilion. In this race, he secured the lead until the final stretch, where he went on a tough duel with Fine Rouge who sprinted from the third position, overtook him and win by over two and a half lengths. Sticking with the same jockey as previous race which was Keita Tosaki, this horse would run at the Jpn II race, Diolite Kinen two months later. When the race began, he stayed at the fourth position in the pack before drawing alongside the leader at the fourth turn, extended his lead in the straight and won the race by a dominant five lengths over the second favorite, Bonneville Record. Then, the team decided to skip him from racing in the Kashiwa Kinen due to hoofs injury and opted for the Teio Sho in June instead. In this race, he would start from the inner most gate 1 and his recent rival, Bonneville Record would start from gate 6. Tosaki picked up a different strategy in this race as he went for the lead from the gate and brought it home for Furioso's second win in a row. Bonneville Record gave a chase at the end but only managed a second place finish, one and a half lengths behind. In September, Furioso ran in the Nippon TV Hai with a new jockey, Shotaro Kawashima because Tosaki suffered a fracture. The story for this race was rather similar compared to Teio Sho but this time, Bonneville Record managed to gradually advanced and won a close battle with Furioso at the line by three-quarters-of-a-length in a record time. For the rest of the year, Furioso ran in three more races which were the JBC Classic, Japan Cup Dirt and Tokyo Daishoten. Even though Tosaki relinquished the rein, he finished outside of podium in each of them. At the end of the year, Furioso won the NAR horse of the year for second time in a row and also the best older horse or mare award in the same time.

=== 2009: five-year-old season ===
Furioso restarted the campaign with the same race as last season, the Kawasaki Kinen. In this race, he was leading for most of the race but lost the final duel to the line against Kane Hekili who was ridden by Christophe Lemaire and finished in second place by half-lengths behind. In March, Furioso came to defend his previous win at the Diolite Kinen from the second outermost gate, gate 13. In this occasion, he led from the start, crossed the finishing line to win by a dominant four lengths over Meiner Hourglass and successfully defend his title. Two months later, he ran in the Kashiwa Kinen for the first time since he missed out on this race last year due to injury. He performed badly in this race as he crossed the line in fifth place, six and a half lengths behind the winner, Espoir City. The next month, He ran in the Teio Sho as a defending champion. Like usual, Furioso stayed at the front group and entered the duel with Vermilion at the final straight in which he would lost and finished the race three lengths behind the record-tying run by Vermilion. He ran two more times at the end of the season with an appearance at the Breeders's Gold Cup and the Tokyo Daishoten, where he finished in fourth and seventh respectively for both races. Despite poorer results compared to previous year, Furioso won the best older horse and mare award for second consecutive year.

=== 2010: six-year-old season ===
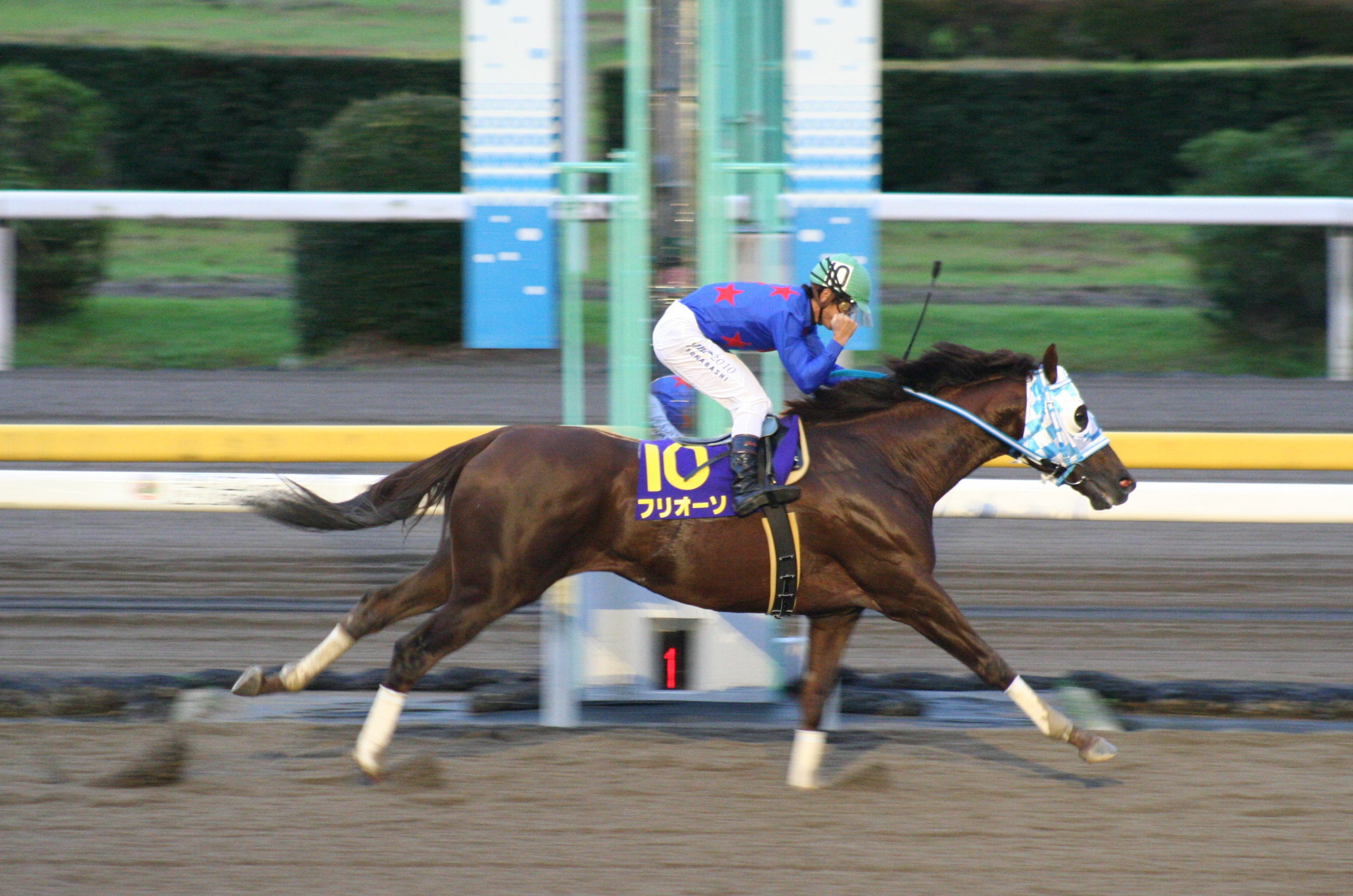
Furioso at the 2010 Nippon Tv Hai

Similar as previous years, he resumed his career at the Kawasaki Kinen. For this year, he would be assigned to gate 3 at the start. This would be another race where Vermilion eked out a victory in a duel to the finish line against Furioso, who finished in second place just by a neck margin behind. Onto the next race which was the Diolite Kinen, Furioso did not performed well and finished in fifth place, ending his back to back winning streak here. Following his usual path, he would run for the second time in the Kashiwa Kinen on May. The race turned out like a repeat of last year when Espoir City tracked the leaders from a good position, drew alongside them at the fourth turn, and then won a close battle against Furioso in the straight to win by one and a half lengths ahead. At the Teio Sho, Furioso would be drawn into gate 4 at the starting stall. When the gates opened, Tosaki did not took the lead early. Instead, he propelled Furioso mainly on the second position before turned on the jets on the final straight to win the race by two-and-a-half-lengths over Kane Hekili. This would be his first win since the 2009 Diolite Kinen as he defeated most of his rivals such as Vermilion, Kane Hekili, Success Brocken, Bonneville Record and the new favourite in Smart Falcon. Tosaki praised the condition of Furioso before the race and how he was able to stay calm and ride comfortably along the way. He returned to racing at the Nippon TV Hai in September and comfortably won it by two-and-a-half-lengths against the second place finisher, Transcend. For the remaining run of the season, Furioso appeared and finished second twice behind Smart Falcon. At the JBC Classic, he was outclassed and lost the race by seven lengths and for the Tokyo Daishoten, Smart Falcon outwitted the pack, took the lead from the start and held off the rest of the field in the straight to win by one-and-three-quarters-of-a-lengths in a record time. With two wins and four second place finishes out of seven starts for the year, Furioso won the NAR horse of the year award for the third time and the best older horse and mare award for third consecutive year.

=== 2011: seven-year-old season ===
For the fourth consecutive years, he started the season with the Kawasaki Kinen. After four attempts, Furioso led this entire race to win by five lengths over Meisho Tametomo. After this win, he would ran in the February Stakes for the first time in his career with a different jockey, Mirco Demuro. Due to the difference of the track surface as this race was held at Tokyo, he could not make a good use of his usual start, went wide in early corners, moved outside and accelerated on the final 100 metres to finish in second place, one-and-a-half-lengths behind Transcend. Three months later, he started on the Kashiwa Kinen back with Tosaki as his jockey and would started from gate 11, just beside Espoir City in gate 10. On his third try, Furioso got his first Kashiwa Kinen victory by three-quarters-of-a-length ahead of the second place finisher, La Verita. This is also the first time Furioso beat Espoir City in a race. Tosaki felt relieved and noted that:

"I am very happy to have beaten Espoir City. I had never beaten him before, so I was conscious of him. I had planned to go to the front, but the horse on the outside had more momentum, so I held back. He had a good race coming from behind in the February Stakes as well. I thought that as long as I ran in a way that didn't upset Furioso, it would be fine. He ran a really strong race, and I think we were able to win today thanks to everyone's support. Thank you very much."

In the second half of the season, Furioso supposed to race at the Nippon Tv Hai but he was withdrawn from the race due to illness. This withdrawal eventually subsided him from racing for the remainder of the season. Even though he only raced for half year, he continued his streak of winning the NAR horse of the year and best older horse.

=== 2012: eight-year-old season ===
In his fifth consecutive appearance on the Kawasaki Kinen, Furioso drew gate 4 whilst his main competitor for this race, Smart Falcon would be beside him at gate 5. On the race day, Smart Falcon was untouchable as he went for the lead from the start and won the race by eight lengths over Furioso, who finished in third at the line. Two months later, He placed outside the podium since 2010 which was a fifth place finish in the Diolite Kinen. In May, Furioso came to the Kashiwa Kinen as the reigning champion this time around. The race went like usual for Furioso in the early phase as he successfully secured the lead. Reaching third corner, Espoir City drew level with him and proceeded to overtook him at the fourth corner. Espoir City pulled away from him at the final straight and won the race by two-and-a-half-lengths over Furioso who finished in second place. The next race supposed to be the Teio Sho but the horse had to be pulled out due to leg problems. Furioso was rested for recuperation and prepared for the second half of the season. In early December, it was announced that Furioso would retire from racing after his final start on the Tokyo Daishoten at the end of the month. In the same manner, Bonneville Record who was his main rival back in 2008 season would also retiring after the same race. In this fateful race, Furioso ran early for the lead but gassed out near the end and finished in sixth place whilst his fellow retiring horse, Bonneville Record only managed to finished in ninth. A retirement ceremony for both horses was held after the race was over. For his performance on this year, Furioso received the NAR best older horse award for five year straight.

== Stud record and retirement ==
He became a stud at the Darley Japan Stallion Complex in Hidaka, Hokkaido and would continue to do so from 2013 until his retirement in 2024. He would spend the rest of his life at CR Stables.

=== Notable progeny ===
c = colt, f = filly

Grade winners
Foaled	Name	Sex	Major Wins
2016	Hikari Oso	c	Tokyo Derby

== In popular culture ==
An anthropomorphized version of Furioso appears as a character in the Japanese multimedia franchise Umamusume: Pretty Derby, voiced by Aki Sairenji. She is depicted as a stoic, standoffish girl who attended a regional school in Funabashi prior to her enrollment at Tracen Academy, and lives in her own residence and commutes to classes alone. Although she views the central racing scene of Tracen Academy as "dangerous" and competes against other students to represent her hometown's racing capabilities, she is close friends with her schoolmates who have affinities for dirt racing including Espoir City, Smart Falcon, Copano Rickey, and Hokko Tarumae.

== Racing form ==
Furioso had a total of 39 starts, 11 of which he won.

Date	Track	Race	Grade	Distance (Condition)	Bracket (Position)	Entry	Odds (Favored)	Finish	Time	Margin	Jockey	Winner (Runner-up)
2006 – two-year-old season
Jul 28	Funabashi	2YO Newcomer		1400m (Fast)	8 (8)	8	4.2 (2)	1st	1:30.2	-0.4	Takayuki Ishizaki	(Belmont Wagner)
Sep 20	Funabashi	2YO Tokubetsu		1600m (Fast)	5 (5)	7	1.4 (1)	1st	1:45.6	-0.9	Takayuki Ishizaki	(Manimari)
Oct 25	Funabashi	Heiwa Sho	GS	1600m (Muddy)	2 (2)	11	1.5 (1)	2nd	1:40.4	0.0	Takayuki Ishizaki	Kinno Raicho
Dec 13	Kawasaki	Zen-Nippon Nisai Yushun	Jpn1	1600m (Good)	7 (12)	14	7.1 (5)	1st	1:41.8	-0.4	Hiroyuki Uchida	(Tropical Light)
2007 – three-year-old season
Feb 4	Tokyo	Kyodo Tsushin Hai	G3	1800m (Firm)	2 (2)	9	17.9 (4)	7th	1:48.7	1.0	Hiroyuki Uchida	Fusaichi Ho O
Mar 18	Nakayama	Spring Stakes	G2	1800m (Firm)	8 (10)	11	49.1 (9)	11th	1:51.8	2.8	Eiji Nakadate	Flying Apple
May 9	Ohi	Haneda Hai	GS	1800m (Fast)	6 (10)	14	2.0 (1)	3rd	1:51.1	0.0	Hiroyuki Uchida	Top Sabaton
Jun 6	Ohi	Tokyo Derby	GS	2000m (Fast)	7 (14)	16	2.4 (1)	2nd	2:05.0	0.0	Hiroyuki Uchida	Ampersand
Jun 11	Ohi	Japan Dirt Derby	Jpn1	2000m (Muddy)	7 (14)	16	6.4 (3)	1st	2:02.9	-0.4	Tadanari Konno	(Ampersand)
Oct 31	Ohi	JBC Classic	Jpn1	2000m (Fast)	6 (12)	16	5.9 (3)	2nd	2:05.5	0.7	Hiroyuki Uchida	Vermilion
Nov 24	Tokyo	Japan Cup Dirt	G1	2000m (Fast)	2 (4)	16	20.3 (9)	10th	2:09.1	2.4	Hiroyuki Uchida	Vermilion
Dec 29	Ohi	Tokyo Daishōten	Jpn1	2000m (Muddy)	6 (11)	15	8.8 (2)	2nd	2:03.9	0.7	Tadanari Konno	Vermilion
2008 – four-year-old season
Jan 30	Kawasaki	Kawasaki Kinen	Jpn1	2100m (Good)	2 (2)	10	2.2 (2)	2nd	2:13.6	0.5	Tadanari Konno	Field Rogue
Mar 5	Funabashi	Diolite Kinen	Jpn2	2400m (Fast)	8 (14)	13	1.1 (1)	1st	2:32.1	-0.9	Keita Tosaki	(Bonneville Record)
Jun 25	Ohi	Teio Sho	Jpn1	2000m (Sloppy)	1 (1)	13	2.5 (1)	1st	2:04.7	-0.2	Keita Tosaki	(Bonneville Record)
Sep 28	Funabashi	Nippon TV Hai	Jpn2	1800m (Muddy)	3 (3)	14	1.8 (1)	2nd	1:47.9	0.1	Shotaro Kawashima	Bonneville Record
Nov 3	Sonoda	JBC Classic	Jpn1	1870m (Fast)	8 (12)	12	7.9 (3)	4th	1:57.3	0.6	Keita Tosaki	Vermilion
Dec 7	Hanshin	Japan Cup Dirt	G1	1800m (Fast)	7 (14)	15	47.6 (12)	7th	1:49.9	0.7	Keita Tosaki	Kane Hekili
Dec 29	Ohi	Tokyo Daishōten	Jpn1	2000m (Fast)	7 (7)	10	12.6 (4)	5th	2:05.5	0.4	Keita Tosaki	Kane Hekili
2009 – five-year-old season
Jan 28	Kawasaki	Kawasaki Kinen	Jpn1	1200m (Good)	7 (11)	13	10.6 (3)	2nd	2:13.4	0.1	Keita Tosaki	Kane Hekili
Mar 11	Funabashi	Diolite Kinen	Jpn2	2400m (Good)	8 (13)	14	1.1 (1)	1st	2:32.1	-0.8	Keita Tosaki	(Meiner Hourglass)
May 5	Funabashi	Kashiwa Kinen	Jpn1	1600m (Sloppy)	8 (12)	13	4.1 (3)	5th	1:37.2	1.3	Keita Tosaki	Espoir City
Jun 24	Ohi	Teio Sho	Jpn1	2000m (Muddy)	3 (3)	13	3.2 (2)	2nd	2:04.1	0.5	Keita Tosaki	Vermilion
Aug 13	Monbetsu	Breeders' Gold Cup	Jpn2	2000m (Sloppy)	4 (6)	15	1.9 (1)	4th	2:02.8	0.6	Keita Tosaki	Smart Falcon
Dec 29	Ohi	Tokyo Daishōten	Jpn1	2000m (Fast)	6 (10)	14	11.0 (4)	7th	2:06.8	0.9	Keita Tosaki	Success Brocken
2010 – six-year-old season
Jan 27	Kawasaki	Kawasaki Kinen	Jpn1	2100m (Fast)	3 (3)	11	5.7 (3)	2nd	2:12.8	0.1	Mirco Demuro	Vermilion
Mar 10	Funabashi	Diolite Kinen	Jpn2	2400m (Muddy)	3 (4)	14	1.7 (1)	5th	2:32.5	1.2	Keita Tosaki	Fusaichi Seven
May 5	Funabashi	Kashiwa Kinen	Jpn1	1600m (Fast)	5 (7)	14	37.6	2nd	1:37.0	0.2	Keita Tosaki	Espoir City
Jun 30	Ohi	Teio Sho	Jpn1	2000m (Good)	3 (4)	15	6.3 (5)	1st	2:03.4	-0.5	Keita Tosaki	(Kane Hekili)
Sep 23	Funabashi	Nippon TV Hai	Jpn2	1800m (Good)	6 (10)	14	2.5 (1)	1st	1:48.8	-0.5	Keita Tosaki	(Transcend)
Nov 3	Funabashi	JBC Classic	Jpn1	1800m (Fast)	3 (3)	13	1.7 (1)	2nd	1:51.2	1.3	Keita Tosaki	Smart Falcon
Dec 29	Ohi	Tokyo Daishōten	Jpn1	2000m (Fast)	6 (9)	14	2.8 (2)	2nd	2:00.7	0.3	Keita Tosaki	Smart Falcon
2011 – seven-year-old season
Jan 26	Kawasaki	Kawasaki Kinen	Jpn1	2100m (Fast)	4 (4)	11	1.0 (1)	1st	2:14.2	-1.1	Keita Tosaki	(Meisho Tametomo)
Feb 20	Tokyo	February Stakes	G1	1600m (Fast)	7 (13)	16	5.5 (3)	2nd	1:36.6	0.2	Mirco Demuro	Transcend
May 5	Funabashi	Kashiwa Kinen	Jpn1	1600m (Good)	7 (11)	13	2.4 (2)	1st	1:38.2	-0.1	Keita Tosaki	(La Verita)
Sep 23	Funabashi	Nippon TV Hai	Jpn2	1800m (Sloppy)	Scratched						Keita Tosaki	Smart Falcon
2012 – eight-year-old season
Jan 25	Kawasaki	Kawasaki Kinen	Jpn1	2100m (Muddy)	4 (4)	12	7.8 (2)	3rd	2:12.3	1.6	Keita Tosaki	Smart Falcon
Mar 14	Funabashi	Diolite Kinen	Jpn2	2400m (Fast)	8 (13)	13	2.7 (2)	5th	2:35.6	0.9	Keita Tosaki	Renforcer
May 2	Funabashi	Kashiwa Kinen	Jpn1	1600m (Sloppy)	5 (6)	13	3.2 (1)	2nd	1:37.0	0.5	Keita Tosaki	Espoir City
Dec 29	Ohi	Tokyo Daishōten	G1	2000m (Sloppy)	5 (6)	12	12.9 (5)	6th	2:08.0	2.1	Keita Tosaki	Roman Legend

Dirt Turf

- Jpn and GS graded races were labeled as listed internationally.

== Pedigree ==
Pedigree of Furioso(JPN), chestnut horse, 1 May 2004
Sire Brian's Time dk.b. 1985 (USA)	Roberto b. 1969 (USA)	Hail To Reason (USA)	Turn-To (IRE)
Sire Brian's Time dk.b. 1985 (USA)	Roberto b. 1969 (USA)	Hail To Reason (USA)	Nothirdchance (USA)
Sire Brian's Time dk.b. 1985 (USA)	Roberto b. 1969 (USA)	Bramalea (USA)	Nashua (USA)
Sire Brian's Time dk.b. 1985 (USA)	Roberto b. 1969 (USA)	Bramalea (USA)	Rarelea (USA)
Sire Brian's Time dk.b. 1985 (USA)	Kelley's Day b. 1977 (USA)	Graustark (USA)	Ribot (GB)
Sire Brian's Time dk.b. 1985 (USA)	Kelley's Day b. 1977 (USA)	Graustark (USA)	Flower Bowl (USA)
Sire Brian's Time dk.b. 1985 (USA)	Kelley's Day b. 1977 (USA)	Golden Trail (USA)	Hasty Road (USA)
Sire Brian's Time dk.b. 1985 (USA)	Kelley's Day b. 1977 (USA)	Golden Trail (USA)	Sunny Vale (USA)
Dam Fursa ch. 1995 (USA)	Mr. Prospector b. 1970 (USA)	Raise a Native (USA)	Native Dancer (USA)
Dam Fursa ch. 1995 (USA)	Mr. Prospector b. 1970 (USA)	Raise a Native (USA)	Raise You (USA)
Dam Fursa ch. 1995 (USA)	Mr. Prospector b. 1970 (USA)	Gold Digger (USA)	Nashua (USA)
Dam Fursa ch. 1995 (USA)	Mr. Prospector b. 1970 (USA)	Gold Digger (USA)	Sequence (USA)
Dam Fursa ch. 1995 (USA)	Baya ch. 1990 (USA)	Nureyev (USA)	Northern Dancer (CAN)
Dam Fursa ch. 1995 (USA)	Baya ch. 1990 (USA)	Nureyev (USA)	Special (USA)
Dam Fursa ch. 1995 (USA)	Baya ch. 1990 (USA)	Barger (USA)	Riverman (USA)
Dam Fursa ch. 1995 (USA)	Baya ch. 1990 (USA)	Barger (USA)	Trillion (USA) (Family: 4-n)

Inbreeding:

- Nashua: S4 x M4
