= 2012 Dubai World Cup =

17th Dubai World Cup
- Dubai World Cup
- Location: Meydan
- Date: 31 March 2012
- Winning horse: Monterosso (GB)
- Jockey: Mickael Barzalona
- Trainer: Mahmood Al Zarooni (GB/UAE)
- Owner: Godolphin

The 2012 Dubai World Cup was a horse race held at Meydan Racecourse on Saturday 31 March 2012. It was the 17th running of the Dubai World Cup.

The winner was Godolphin's Monterosso, a five-year-old bay entire horse trained in Dubai by Mahmood Al Zarooni and ridden by Mickael Barzalona. Monterosso's victory was the first in the race for his jockey and trainer and the fifth for Godolphin.

Monterosso had been trained in England by Mark Johnston in 2009 and 2010, winning five races including the King Edward VII Stakes at Royal Ascot. In 2011 he was transferred to the Godolphin stable and sent to compete in Dubai where he won the Dubai City of Gold and finished third to Victoire Pisa in the Dubai World Cup. In the 2012 World Cup he started a 20/1 outsider and won by three lengths from his more fancied stable companion Capponi with the British-trained Planteur half a length back in third. The 5/4 favourite So You Think finished fourth of the thirteen runners.

== Race details ==
- Sponsor: Emirates
- Purse: £6,451,613; First prize: £3,870,968
- Surface: Tapeta
- Going: Standard
- Distance: 10 furlongs
- Number of runners: 13
- Winner's time: 2:02.67

== Full result ==
Pos.	Marg.	Horse (bred)	Age	Jockey	Trainer (Country)	Odds
1		Monterosso (GB)	5	Mickael Barzalona	Mahmood Al Zarooni (GB/UAE)	20/1
2	3	Capponi (IRE)	5	Ahmed Ajtebi	Mahmood Al Zarooni (GB/UAE)	11/1
3	½	Planteur (IRE)	5	Ryan Moore	Marco Botti (GB)	14/1
4	½	So You Think (NZ)	6	Joseph O'Brien	Aidan O'Brien (GB)	5/4 fav
5	2¼	Zazou (GER)	5	Olivier Peslier	Waldemar Hickst (GER)	12/1
6	1	Eishin Flash (JPN)	5	Christophe Lemaire	Hideaki Fujiwara (JPN)	14/1
7	hd	Prince Bishop (IRE)	5	Frankie Dettori	Saeed bin Suroor (GB/UAE)	33/1
8	nk	Master of Hounds (USA)	4	Christophe Soumillon	Mike de Kock (SAF)	20/1
9	1	Royal Delta (USA)	4	Jose Lezcano	Bill Mott (USA)	10/1
10	3¼	Smart Falcon (JPN)	7	Yutaka Take	Ken Kozaki (JPN)	13/2
11	½	Mendip (USA)	5	Silvestre de Sousa	Saeed bin Suroor (GB/UAE)	33/1
12	8¼	Game On Dude (USA)	5	Chantal Sutherland-Kruse	Bob Baffert (USA)	8/1
13	4	Transcend (JPN)	6	Shinji Fujita	Takayuki Yasuda (JPN)	20/1

- Abbreviations: nse = nose; nk = neck; shd = head; hd = head

== Winner's details ==
Further details of the winner, Monterosso

- Sex: Stallion
- Foaled: 14 February 2007
- Country: United Kingdom
- Sire: Dubawi; Dam: Porto Roca (Barathea)
- Owner: Godolphin
- Breeder: Darley Stud
