= Kawasaki Kinen =

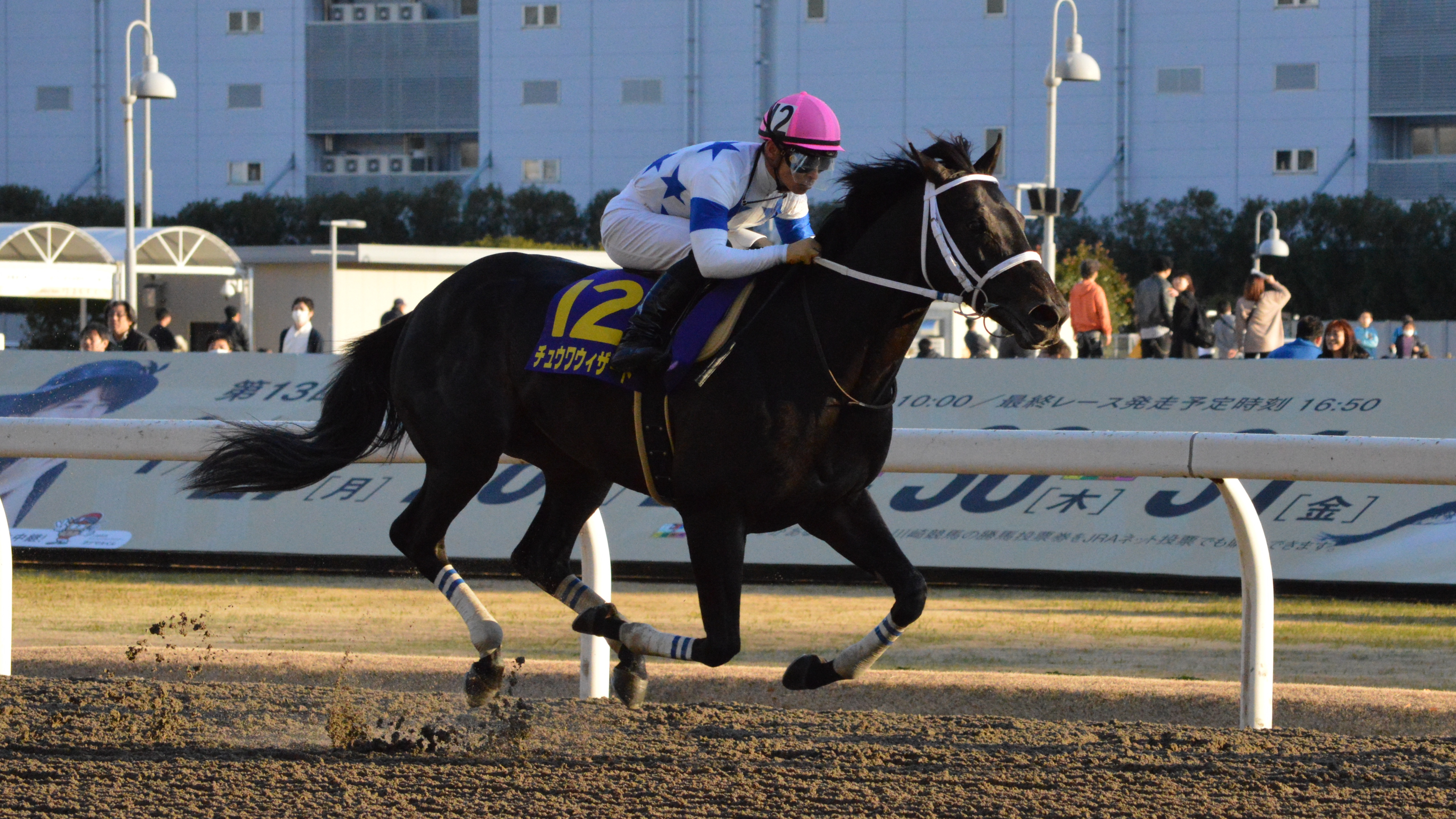
- 2020 Kawasaki Kinen winner, Chuwa Wizard
- Class: Domestic Grade I (JpnI)
- Location: Kawasaki Racecourse, Kawasaki, Kanagawa
- Inaugurated: 1951
- Race type: Thoroughbred flat racing

Race information
- Distance: 2,100 meters (About 10and1/2 furlongs)
- Surface: Dirt
- Track: Left-handed
- Qualification: 4-y-o & up
- Weight: 4-y-o horses & geldings 56kg/mares 54kg/5-y-o & up horses & geldings 57kg / mares 55 kg
- Purse: ¥170,000,000 (as of 2026); 1st: ¥ 100,000,000; 2nd: ¥ 35,000,000; 3rd: ¥ 20,000,000

The Kawasaki Kinen (Kawasaki Memorial) (川崎記念) is a Japanese thoroughbred horse race on dirt track for horses aged four years or older. It was graded as a domestic grade 1 race in 1998. Held in early April, it is the first (domestic) grade 1 race in Japanese horseracing season. Its name comes from its venue, the Kawasaki Racecourse, which in turn is named after the city that it is situated in; Kawasaki city in Kanagawa prefecture.

This race was formerly regarded as a preparation race for the Dubai World Cup, along with the February Stakes. Although some past winners (such as Smart Falcon and Vermilion) ran the Dubai World Cup after winning this race, only Ushba Tesoro won both the Kawasaki Kinen and the Dubai World Cup. But in 2024, the race schedule was moved from January to April, losing the race's status as a preparation race for the Dubai World Cup and February Stakes.

== Records ==
Most successful horses (3 wins):

Most successful horses (3 wins):

- Countess Up – 1985, 1986, 1987
- Hokko Tarumae – 2014, 2015, 2016

Other repeat winners (2 wins):

- Ichi Kanto – 1958, 1959
- Gold Spencer – 1980, 1981
- Daring Grass – 1982, 1984
- Hokuto Vega – 1996, 1997
- Abukuma Poro – 1998, 1999
- Vermilion – 2007, 2010
- Chuwa Wizard – 2020, 2022

== Winners since 2000 ==
Year	Winner	Age	Jockey	Trainer	Owner	Organization	Time
2000	Intelli Power	5	Takashi Harita	Shigemi Akiyama	Iso-o Sahashi	Kawasaki	2:14.5
2001	Regular Member	4	Mikio Matsunaga	Yamamoto Syouji	North Hills Ltd.	JRA	2:12.9
2002	Regent Bluff	4	Yutaka Yoshida	Youkichi Okubo	Akihiro Ohara	JRA	2:16.2
2003	Kanetsu Fleuve	6	Mikio Matsunaga	Yamamoto Syouji	Laurel Racing Co.	JRA	2:14.8
2004	Esprit Thes	5	Hiroshi Morishita	Ei-ichi Takei	Yasuo Yoda	Kawasaki	2:12.8
2005	Time Paradox	7	Yutaka Take	Hiroyoshi Matsuda	Shadai Racing Ltd.	JRA	2:14.2
2006	Adjudi Mitsuo	5	Hiroyuki Uchida	Masayuki Kawashima	Masao Orudo	Funabashi	2:12.8
2007	Vermilion	5	Christophe Lemaire	Sei Ishizaka	Sunday Racing Ltd.	JRA	2:12.9
2008	Field Rouge	6	Norihiro Yokoyama	Masato Nishizono	Katsumi Chida	JRA	2:13.1
2009	Kane Hekili	7	Christophe Lemaire	Katsuhiko Sumii	Kaneko Makoto Holdings Co.	JRA	2:13.3
2010	Vermilion	8	Yutaka Take	Sei Ishizaka	Sunday Racing Ltd.	JRA	2:12.7
2011	Furioso	7	Keita Tosaki	Masayuki Kawashima	Darley Japan K.K.	Funabashi	2:14.2
2012	Smart Falcon	7	Yutaka Take	Ken Kozaki	Touru Okawa	JRA	2:10.7
2013	Hatano Vainqueur	4	Hirofumi Shii	Mitsugu Kon	Good Luck Farm	JRA	2:15.4
2014	Hokko Tarumae	5	Hideaki Miyuki	Katsuichi Nishiura	Koichi Yabe	JRA	2:13.8
2015	Hokko Tarumae	6	Hideaki Miyuki	Katsuichi Nishiura	Koichi Yabe	JRA	2:16.9
2016	Hokko Tarumae	7	Hideaki Miyuki	Katsuichi Nishiura	Koichi Yabe	JRA	2:14.1
2017	All Blush	5	Christophe Lemaire	Akira Murayama	Shadai Racing Ltd.	JRA	2:14.6
2018	K T Brave	5	Yuichi Fukunaga	Tetsuya Meno	Kazuyoshi Takimoto	JRA	2:14.9
2019	Mitsuba	7	Ryuji Wada	Tadashi Kayo	K.K. Kyoei	JRA	2:15.0
2020	Chuwa Wizard	5	Yuga Kawada	Ryuji Okubo	Shinobu Nakanishi	JRA	2:14.1
2021	Casino Fountain	5	Kaoru Harita	Takayuki Yamashita	Kosei Yoshihashi	Funabashi	2:14.9
2022	Chuwa Wizard	7	Yuga Kawada	Ryuji Okubo	Shinobu Nakanishi	JRA	2:14.9
2023	Ushba Tesoro	6	Kazuo Yokoyama	Noboru Takagi	Ryotokuji Kenji Holdings Co., Ltd.	JRA	2:16.0
2024	Light Warrior	7	Hiroto Yoshihara	Katsuyoshi Uchida	U Carrot Farm	Kawasaki	2:15.5
2025	Meisho Hario	8	Suguru Hamanaka	Inao Okada	Yoshio Matsumoto	JRA	2:18.0
2026	Kazeno Runner	5	Atsuya Nishimura	Mikio Matsunaga	Kodai Maeda	JRA	2:14.6

== Earlier winners ==
- 1951 - Ezo Tetsuzan
- 1952 - Kiyofuji
- 1953 - Ikaho dake
- 1954 - Ichisachi Homare
- 1955 - Asakuni
- 1956 - Kane Eikan
- 1957 - Sweetheart
- 1958 - Ichi Kanto
- 1959 - Ichi Kanto
- 1960 - A Time
- 1961 - Ichiasahide
- 1962 - Asabue
- 1963 - Sakimidori
- 1964 - Galing
- 1965 - Tetsuryu
- 1966 - Eikozan
- 1967 - Hello Time
- 1968 - Marble Arch
- 1969 - Ashiya Fuji
- 1970 - Apo Speed
- 1971 - Ryuto Kitsu
- 1973 - Nero
- 1974 - Golden Snap
- 1975 - Maruichi Daio
- 1976 - Hideno Arashi
- 1977 - Plus One
- 1978 - F.Chirin
- 1979 - Tagawa Ace
- 1980 - Gold Spencer
- 1981 - Gold Spencer
- 1982 - Daring Grass
- 1983 - Kanesho Super
- 1984 - Daring Grass
- 1985 - Countess Up
- 1986 - Countess Up
- 1987 - Countess Up
- 1988 - Tomihisa Dancer
- 1989 - Aeroplane
- 1990 - Rosita
- 1991 - Daiko Galdan
- 1992 - Toshin Eagle
- 1993 - Hashiru Shogun
- 1994 - Sakura High Speed
- 1995 - Amazon Opera
- 1996 - Hokuto Vega
- 1997 - Hokuto Vega
- 1998 - Abukuma Poro
- 1999 - Abukuma Poro
