= Eishin Flash =

Japanese thoroughbred racehorse

Eishin Flash エイシンフラッシュ
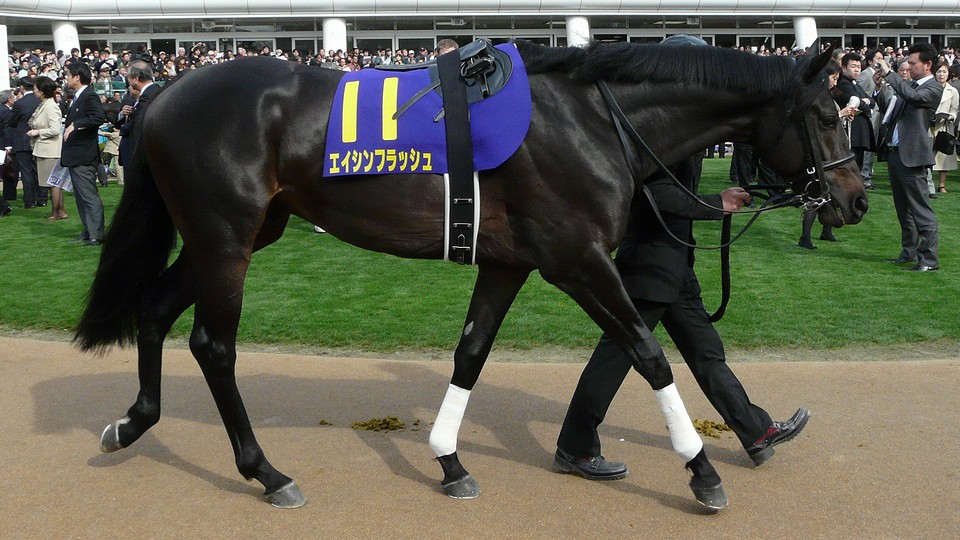
- Eishin Flash at the paddock of the 2010 Satsuki Shō.
- Breed: Thoroughbred
- Sire: King's Best (USA)
- Grandsire: Kingmambo (USA)
- Dam: Moonlady (GER)
- Damsire: Platini (GER)
- Sex: Stallion
- Foaled: March 27, 2007 (age 19)
- Country: Japan
- Color: Dark Bay
- Breeder: Shadai Farm
- Owner: Toyomitsu Hirai →Katsuhiko Hirai
- Racing colors
- Trainer: Hideaki Fujiwara
- Jockey: Mirco Demuro
- Record: 27:6-3-7
- Earnings: ¥777,360,900; JPN：¥756,072,000; UAE：US$200,000; HKG：HK$1,400,000

Major wins
- Keisei Hai (2010); Tennō Shō (Autumn) (2012); Mainichi Okan (2013); Japanese Classic Race wins: Tokyo Yushun (2010)

Eishin Flash (Japanese: エイシンフラッシュ, Hepburn: Eishin Furasshu; foaled March 27, 2007) is a retired Japanese Thoroughbred racehorse and sire. His major wins include the 2010 Tōkyō Yūshun, the 2012 Autumn Tenno Sho, the 2010 Keisei Hai and the 2013 Mainichi Okan.

== Racing career ==
=== 2009: Two-year old season ===
Eishin Flash debuted at a debut race for 2 year olds over 1800 meters (turf) on July 12 at Hanshin, finishing in 6th place with Yuichi Fukunaga in the saddle. Two months later, the horse had his first win at another maiden race held at Kyoto, this time with Hiroyuki Uchida as his jockey. Fukunaga once again became the horse's jockey later at the Hagi Stakes but finished 3rd. Later on, with Uchida back as jockey, Eishin Flash won the Erika Sho, leading to Uchida becoming the main jockey.

=== 2010: Three-year old season ===
At the Keisei Hai, because Uchida was injured in another race, Norihiro Yokoyama briefly took over the role of jockey. Eishin Flash was nonetheless the most favored to win owing to the Erika Sho victory, and subsequently won the race, making it his first graded race victory. Later, the horse was scheduled to run the Wakaba Stakes but was forced to skip the race as the horse contracted pneumonia. The horse was then sent to the Satsuki Shō, where he was the 11th most favored to win but managed to finish 3rd, securing priority entry to the Japanese Derby.

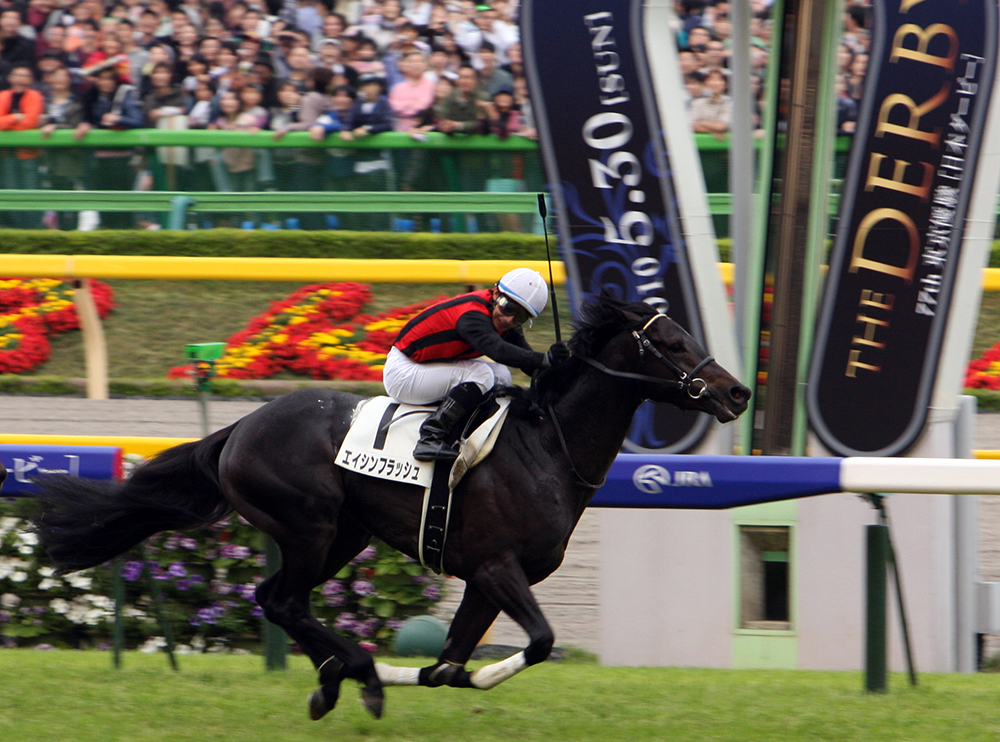
Eishin Flash at the Tokyo Yushun

At the 77th Tokyo Yushun (Japanese Derby) the horse was the 7th most favored to win. The horse ran in the middle of the pack, which covered the first 1000 meters at a slow pace of 1:01.6 and the first mile 1:41.6. As the pack entered the final stretch, the horse took the lead, running the last three furlongs at a record breaking 32.7 seconds, and held on to the lead across the finish line even as Rose Kingdom closed in. This marked the first Tokyo Yushun victory for both Uchida, trainer Hideaki Fujiwara, and owner Toyomitsu Hirai.

Later on in Autumn, the horse was entered in to the Kobe Shimbun Hai with the Kikka Sho in mind. However, the horse was beaten by the winner, Rose Kingdom, by a neck. The horse was still scheduled to run, but a few days before the race, the vet that checked the horse noticed symptoms of muscle pain and the plans to enter the horse in the race were scrapped at the last minute. Later on, the horse was sent to run in the Japan Cup and Arima Kinen but finished unplaced in both races.

=== 2011: Four-year old season ===
Eishin Flash started the 2011 season with the Osaka Hai, but finished third behind Hiruno d'Amour. Later on, the horse ran the Spring Tenno Sho, but finished 2nd to Hiruno d'Amour again. Later at Takarazuka Kinen, Katsumi Ando took over the role of jockey following another accident that left Uchida injured. At Takarazuka, the horse finished third behind Earnestly.

In Autumn, the horse was entered in to the Autumn Tenno Sho, with Christophe Lemaire as jockey, where he finished 6th. The horse was unplaced in Japan Cup, and at Arima Kinen the horse finished 2nd behind Orfevre.

=== 2012: Five-year old season ===
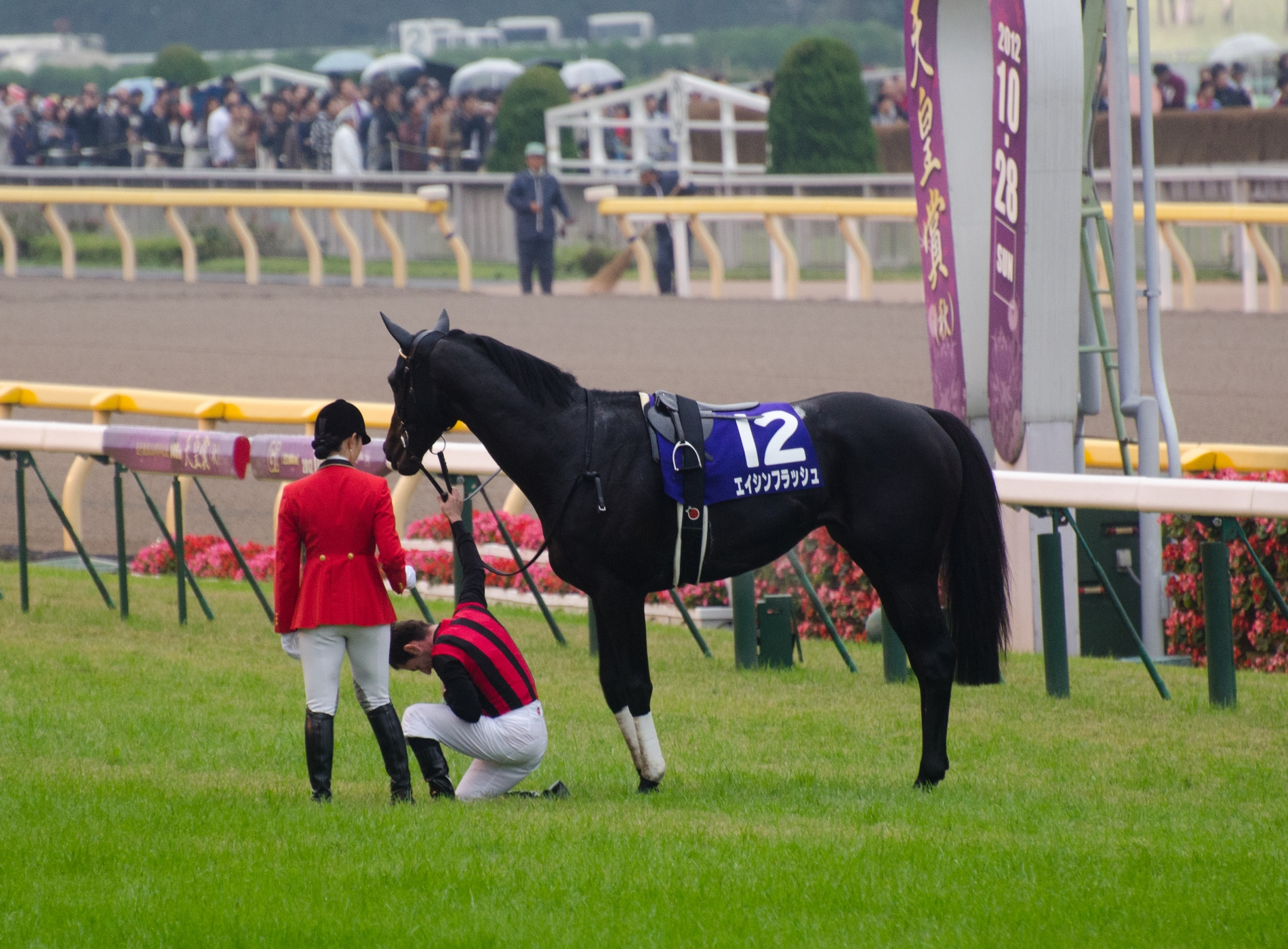
Demuro kneeling before the Emperor and Empress of Japan after winning the 2012 Autumn Tenno Sho

Eishin Flash was one of three Japanese horses that was entered in to that year's Dubai World Cup, together with Transcend and Smart Falcon, where he finished 6th, which was the best of those three. After returning to Japan, he was entered in to the Takarazuka Kinen with Uchida returning as jockey, but finished 6th, with the 5th place horse beating him by 5 lengths. After a summer break, the horse started off unplaced in the Mainichi Okan, but at the Autumn Tenno Sho, which became the first Tenno Sho in 7 years to be attended by Emperor Akihito and Empress Michiko, the horse won his first race in 13 starts, and his second Grade I race since the Japanese Derby. Following the race, Eishin Flash's jockey, Mirco Demuro, dismounted from the horse, removed his helmet, and knelt in front of the Emperor and Empress.

On the horse's final race of the season, the Arima Kinen, Demuro was diagnosed with ureteral stones and Kousei Miura took over the role of jockey on the day of the race. At the race, the horse briefly took over the lead briefly but was quickly overtaken by Gold Ship and ultimately finished fourth.

=== 2013: Six-year old season ===
As Toyomitsu Hirai died on the March 2, ownership of the horse was transferred to Katsuhiko, his second born son. As for the horse himself, the horse started the season with the Osaka Hai on March 31, but finished 3rd behind Orfevre. After this, the horse was sent to Hong Kong to race the Queen Elizabeth II Cup with Mirco Demuro, where he finished 3rd behind Military Attack, who finished a length and three-quarters in front of him. After a five and a half months long break, he was entered in to the Mainichi Okan and won. He was then entered to the Tenno Sho (Autumn) to win the race once again, but finished third. He later finished 10th in the Japan Cup. He was planned to run in the Arima Kinen as his final race, but his gait showed signs of problems, and as a result the horse was scratched. In spite of this, a retirement ceremony was still held at Nakayama Racecourse on December 23.

== Stud career ==
Following his retirement, he stood stud at Shadai Stallion Station, before being transferred to Lex Stud in late 2018 where he stayed until his retirement from stud duties in late 2025. Since then, Eishin Flash is pensioned at the Yogibo Versailles Resort Farm in Hidaka, Hokkaido.

On May 10, 2026, Eishin Flash was brought to Tokyo Racecourse to be shown at the Rose Garden located inside the race track for a day, as well as a brief reunion with Yuichi Fukunaga; who was present that day as the trainer of Diamond Knot, who was slated to run the NHK Mile Cup that same day.

=== Notable progeny ===
c = colt, f = filly, g = gelding
Bold: Grade 1 races

**Foaled**	**Name**	**Sex**	**Major Wins**
2017	T O Socrates	c	Kokura Summer Jump
2017	Vela Azul	c	**Japan Cup**, Kyoto Daishoten
2019	Onyankopon	c	Keisei Hai

== In popular culture ==
An anthropomorphized version of Eishin Flash appears as a character in the Japanese multimedia franchise Umamusume: Pretty Derby, voiced by Ayami Fujino. She is depicted as a polite and meticulous international student from Germany, a reference to the real horse's German pedigree via his dam Moonlady. She keeps schedules down to the days years in advance and insists on exact measurements on almost everything she does, with a tendency to panic or wear herself out if her plans are disrupted in any way. Eishin Flash's racing record is also reflected in the character's career mode, as well as mechanics such as her pre-race bowing gesture being a nod to Demuro's kneel at the 2012 Autumn Tenno Sho.

== Racing form ==
Date	Track	Race	Grade	Distance (Condition)	Entry	HN	Odds	Finish	Time	Margins	Jockey	Winner (Runner-up)
**2009 – two-year-old season**
Jul 12	Hanshin	2YO Debut		1,800m (Firm)	15	13	12.4	6th	1:49.3	0.5	Yuichi Fukunaga	Meine Aroma
Oct 11	Kyoto	2YO Maiden		2,000m (Firm)	12	10	3.6	1st	2:02.2	0.0	Hiroyuki Uchida	(Red Sparkle)
Oct 31	Kyoto	Hagi Stakes	OP	1,800m (Firm)	10	5	9.9	3rd	1:47.2	0.5	Yuichi Fukunaga	Cosmo Phantom
Dec 13	Hanshin	Erika Sho	Allowance	2,000m (Firm)	8	2	2.7	1st	2:05.3	0.0	Hiroyuki Uchida	(Blooming Alley)
**2010 – three-year-old season**
Jan 17	Nakayama	Keisei Hai	3	2,000m (Firm)	13	13	2.2	1st	2:03.6	0.0	Norihiro Yokoyama	(Admire Tenku)
Apr 18	Nakayama	Satsuki Sho	1	2,000m (Good)	18	11	40.0	3rd	2:01.0	0.2	Hiroyuki Uchida	Victoire Pisa
May 30	Tokyo	Tokyo Yushun	1	2,400m (Firm)	17	1	31.9	1st	2:26.9	0.0	Hiroyuki Uchida	(Rose Kingdom)
Sep 26	Hanshin	Kobe Shimbun Hai	2	2,400m (Firm)	12	5	1.9	2nd	2:25.9	0.0	Hiroyuki Uchida	Rose Kingdom
Nov 28	Tokyo	Japan Cup	1	2,400m (Firm)	18	10	12.3	8th	2:25.6	0.7	Hiroyuki Uchida	Rose Kingdom
Dec 26	Nakayama	Arima Kinen	1	2,500m (Firm)	15	10	12.6	7th	2:33.0	0.4	Hiroyuki Uchida	Victoire Pisa
**2011 – four-year-old season**
Apr 3	Hanshin	Sankei Osaka Hai	2	2,000m (Firm)	15	15	4.8	3rd	1:57.8	0.0	Hiroyuki Uchida	Hiruno d'Amour
May 1	Kyoto	Tennō Shō (Spring)	1	3,200m (Good)	18	15	7.1	2nd	3:20.7	0.1	Hiroyuki Uchida	Hiruno d'Amour
Jun 26	Hanshin	Takarazuka Kinen	1	2,200m (Good)	16	4	5.6	3rd	2:10.3	0.2	Katsumi Ando	Earnestly
Oct 30	Tokyo	Tenno Sho (Autumn)	1	2,000m (Firm)	18	4	5.9	6th	1:56.8	0.7	Christophe Lemaire	Tosen Jordan
Nov 27	Tokyo	Japan Cup	1	2,400m (Firm)	16	15	11.3	8th	2:24.9	0.7	Kenichi Ikezoe	Buena Vista
Dec 25	Nakayama	Arima Kinen	1	2,500m (Firm)	13	5	26.8	2nd	2:36.1	0.1	Christophe Lemaire	Orfevre
**2012 – five-year-old season**
Mar 31	Meydan	Dubai World Cup	1	2,000m (Standard)	14	2	-	6th	-	-	Christophe Lemaire	Monterosso
Jun 24	Hanshin	Takarazuka Kinen	1	2,200m (Good)	16	6	8.3	6th	2:12.5	1.6	Hiroyuki Uchida	Orfevre
Oct 7	Tokyo	Mainichi Okan	2	1,800m (Firm)	16	13	4.4	9th	1:45.6	0.6	Hiroyuki Uchida	Curren Black Hill
Oct 28	Tokyo	Tenno Sho (Autumn)	1	2,000m (Firm)	18	12	16.6	1st	1:57.3	-0.1	Mirco Demuro	(Fenomeno)
Nov 25	Tokyo	Japan Cup	1	2,400m (Firm)	17	8	13.9	9th	2:24.1	1.0	Christophe Lemaire	Gentildonna
Dec 23	Nakayama	Arima Kinen	1	2,500m (Firm)	16	2	10.0	4th	2:32.4	0.5	Kousei Miura	Gold Ship
**2013 – six-year-old season**
Mar 31	Hanshin	Sankei Osaka Hai	2	2,000m (Firm)	14	7	12.6	3rd	1:59.1	0.1	Cristian Demuro	Orfevre
Apr 28	Sha Tin	QE2C	1	2,000m (Firm)	14	13		3rd	2:02.42	0.3	Mirco Demuro	Military Attack
Oct 6	Tokyo	Mainichi Okan	2	1,800m (Firm)	11	6	7.9	1st	1:46.7	-0.1	Yuichi Fukunaga	(Just A Way)
Oct 27	Tokyo	Tenno Sho (Autumn)	1	2,000m (Firm)	17	6	4.7	3rd	1:58.5	1.0	Mirco Demuro	Just A Way
Nov 24	Tokyo	Japan Cup	1	2,400m (Firm)	17	4	4.9	10th	2:26.6	0.5	Mirco Demuro	Gentildonna

Legend:
All-weather track Turf

== Pedigree ==
Pedigree of Eishin Flash
Sire *King's Best 1997 bay	Kingmambo; 1990 bay	Mr. Prospector	Raise a Native
Sire *King's Best 1997 bay	Kingmambo; 1990 bay	Mr. Prospector	Gold Digger
Sire *King's Best 1997 bay	Kingmambo; 1990 bay	Miesque	Nureyev
Sire *King's Best 1997 bay	Kingmambo; 1990 bay	Miesque	Pasadoble
Sire *King's Best 1997 bay	Allegretta; 1978 chestnut	Lombard	Agio
Sire *King's Best 1997 bay	Allegretta; 1978 chestnut	Lombard	Promised Lady
Sire *King's Best 1997 bay	Allegretta; 1978 chestnut	Anatevka	Espresso
Sire *King's Best 1997 bay	Allegretta; 1978 chestnut	Anatevka	Almyra
Dam Moonlady 1997 dark bay	Platini; 1989 chestnut	Surumu	Literat
Dam Moonlady 1997 dark bay	Platini; 1989 chestnut	Surumu	Surama
Dam Moonlady 1997 dark bay	Platini; 1989 chestnut	Prairie Darling	Stanford
Dam Moonlady 1997 dark bay	Platini; 1989 chestnut	Prairie Darling	Prairie Belle
Dam Moonlady 1997 dark bay	Midnight Fever; 1991 bay	Sure Blade	Kris
Dam Moonlady 1997 dark bay	Midnight Fever; 1991 bay	Sure Blade	Double Lock
Dam Moonlady 1997 dark bay	Midnight Fever; 1991 bay	Majoritat	Konigsstuhl
Dam Moonlady 1997 dark bay	Midnight Fever; 1991 bay	Majoritat	Monacchia
