= Vermilion (horse) =

Japanese thoroughbred racehorse (2002–2024)

Vermilion; ヴァーミリアン
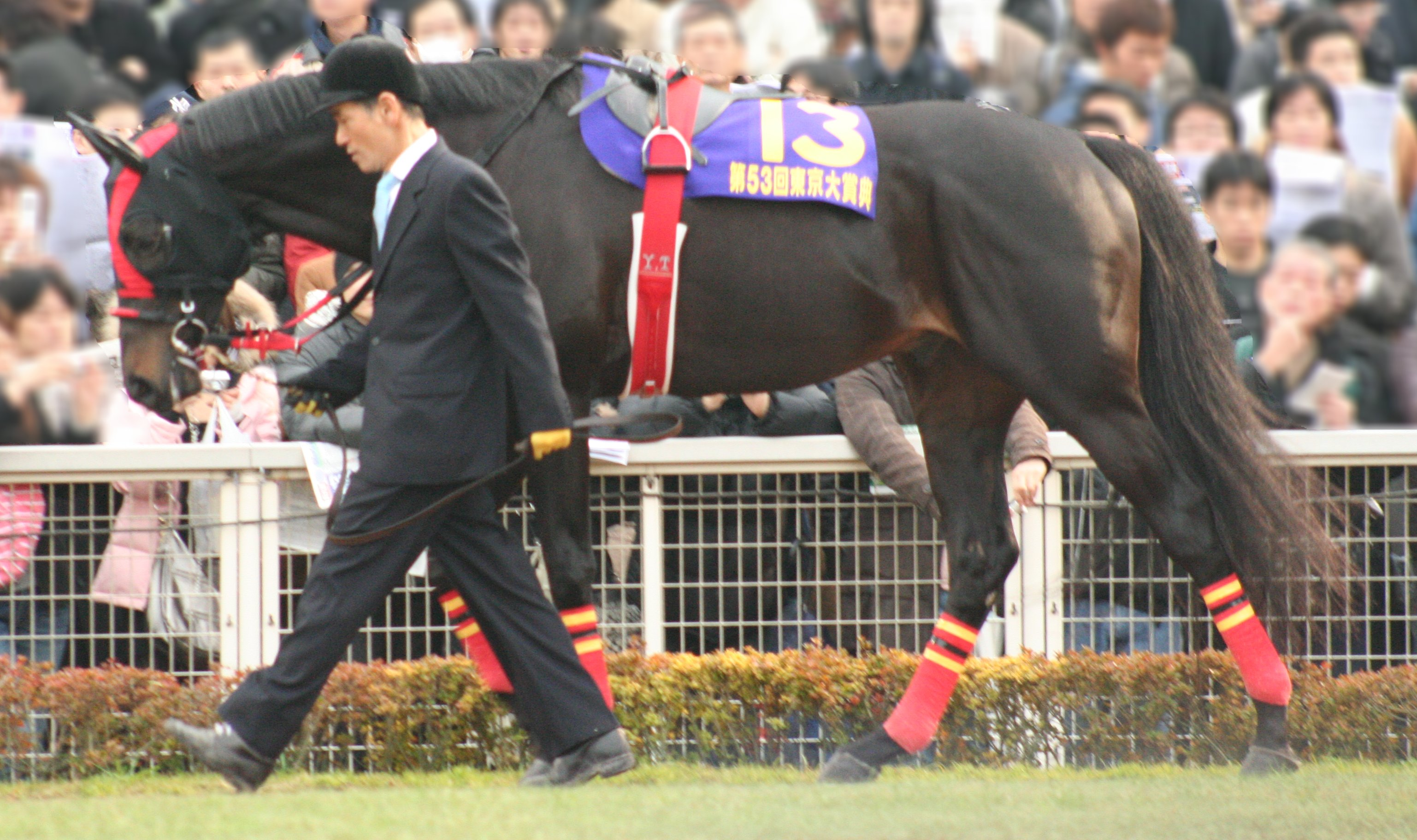
- Vermilion at the 2007 Tokyo Daishoten.
- Breed: Thoroughbred
- Sire: El Condor Pasa (USA)
- Grandsire: Kingmambo (USA)
- Dam: Scarlet Lady (JPN)
- Damsire: Sunday Silence (USA)
- Sex: Stallion
- Foaled: 10 April 2002
- Died: 12 September 2024 (aged 22)
- Country: Japan
- Colour: Dark bay
- Breeder: Northern Farm
- Owner: Sunday Racing Co. Ltd
- Racing colours
- Trainer: Sei Ishizaka
- Jockey: Yutaka Take; Christophe Lemaire
- Record: 34: 15-5-1-13
- Earnings: ￥1,168,607,500

Major wins
- Radio Tampa Hai Nisai Stakes (2004); Urawa Kinen (2005); Diolite Kinen (2006); Nagoya Grand Prix (2006); Kawasaki Kinen (2007, 2010); JBC Classic (2007, 2008, 2009); Japan Cup Dirt (2007); Tokyo Daishoten (2007); February Stakes (2008); Teio Sho (2009)

Awards
- JRA Award for Best Dirt Horse (2007)

Vermilion (Japanese: ヴァーミリアン, Vāmirian; 10 April 2002 - 12 September 2024) was a Japanese thoroughbred racehorse. Over the course of his career, he won nine G1s (including domestic Jpn1 races) and set multiple records on the dirt.

== Background ==
Vermilion was a dark bay horse with a white star standing 16.3 hands high (170 cm) at maturity. He was sired by 1999 Japanese Horse of the Year El Condor Pasa out of the Sunday Silence mare Scarlet Lady. Scarlet Lady was mildly successful on the track, winning one out of sixteen outings, but she recorded far better results in her second career as a broodmare. She produced ten winners, including three other graded stakes winners, out of fifteen total foals.

As a foal, 40 shares in his ownership were sold for 600,000 yen, totaling up to 24 million yen.

His name is based on the color of the same name, as his dam, granddam and great-granddam all include "Scarlet", another shade of red, in their names.

Before he debuted, he trained along with the future Triple Crown winner Deep Impact. He was sent into training with Sei Ishizaka, who would later train the Triple Tiara winner Gentildonna. Trainer Ishizaka mentioned that Vermilion was "the only horse able to keep up with Deep Impact". He was considered to be an intelligent horse, yet 'immature' in his early years. During his racing days, he was distinctive for wearing a black mask with a red cross that bore his name in cursive yellow lettering.

== Racing career ==
=== Two-year-old season (2004) ===
Vermilion debuted in 2004 on the tenth of October at Kyoto Racecourse, on the turf going 1800 meters. He would face 7 other horses, and he was sent off as the second favorite. He took a position near the front, right behind the leader One's Card, and pulled away at the final corner to finish first, three and a half lengths in front of second place Out Of Sight. His next two races would be at the Open class, in the Hagi Stakes and Kyoto Nisai Stakes; he finished second in both.

On December 25, he raced for the final time that year and was stepped up in class to the Grade 3 Radio Tampa Hai Nisai Stakes where he would go up against Rosenkreuz, and Six Sense, both of whom he had raced against in his last outing. He would be racing from the furthest outside gate, but it proved to be no issue as he stalked Six Sense from two or three lengths behind, and then closed the gap, fending off a fierce closing spurt from both Rosenkreuz and Admire Japan in the final strides. After the race, trainer Ishizaka commented that, "Compared to his last race, he improved well. The pace was rather slow this time, and he settled well without any issues. He's a good horse, and I'm looking forward to more successful races next year."

=== Three-year-old season (2005) ===
Despite confidence from his trainer, Vermilion's three-year-old season had a rocky start. In his four starts on turf in 2005, he placed out of the money in all of them. His first win of the year came in the Enif Stakes in October, an Open class race over 1800 meters on the dirt. This would be his first race against older, more experienced horses, such as the Grade 1 winning Eishin Champ. He was the third favorite in a field of sixteen at odds of 10.4. Due to the rainy conditions that day, he was slow out of the gate but found his footing and settled on the inside near the front of the pack. Turning the corner into the final straight, he easily overtook a tiring Lover's Lane and just barely fended off Don Cool by a nose. This would decide the trajectory of the rest of his career, as he never made a start on the turf again.

Just a month later on the thirtieth of November, he raced in the Urawa Kinen, where he prevailed over Hard Crystal and February Stakes winner Nobo True by three lengths. In December, he was scheduled to run in the Nagoya Grand Prix as his last race of the season, but due to heavy snow the race card was called off for the day and the race was cancelled and it was not rescheduled for a later date.

=== Four-year-old season (2006) ===
Vermilion was pointed to the Grade 3 Heian Stakes in January after the cancellation of the Nagoya Grand Prix, but was narrowly beaten by Tagano Guernica. From here, he was entered in his first Grade 1 race on the dirt, the mile long February Stakes. It was here he would face many proven dirt horses; among them being the Japan Cup Dirt winner from the previous year, Kane Hekili, the two-time Tokyo Daishōten winner Adjudi Mitsuo, and Time Paradox, who had won four Grade 1 races at the time. He raced a little further back in the pack than in his previous races, and in the end he could not catch up to the leading horses, and finished fifth. He would be raced under a month later in the Diolite Kinen, where he would return to his winning ways and dominate the field by three lengths. His spring campaign was concluded with his first off the board finish since he switched to dirt; a thirteenth place in the Tokai Stakes. After this race, he was examined by a veterinarian and it was deemed highly likely that he had developed atrial fibrillation during the race.

Upon his return, Vermilion would race in the Japan Cup Dirt under jockey Christophe Lemaire. He was the ninth favorite, but outplaced his odds and hit the board, placing fourth. The winner of the race, Alondite, was also trained by Ishizaka Sei. To round off the year, he ran in the Nagoya Grand Prix, where he came from mid-pack and pulled ahead by six lengths to win.

=== Five-year-old season (2007) ===
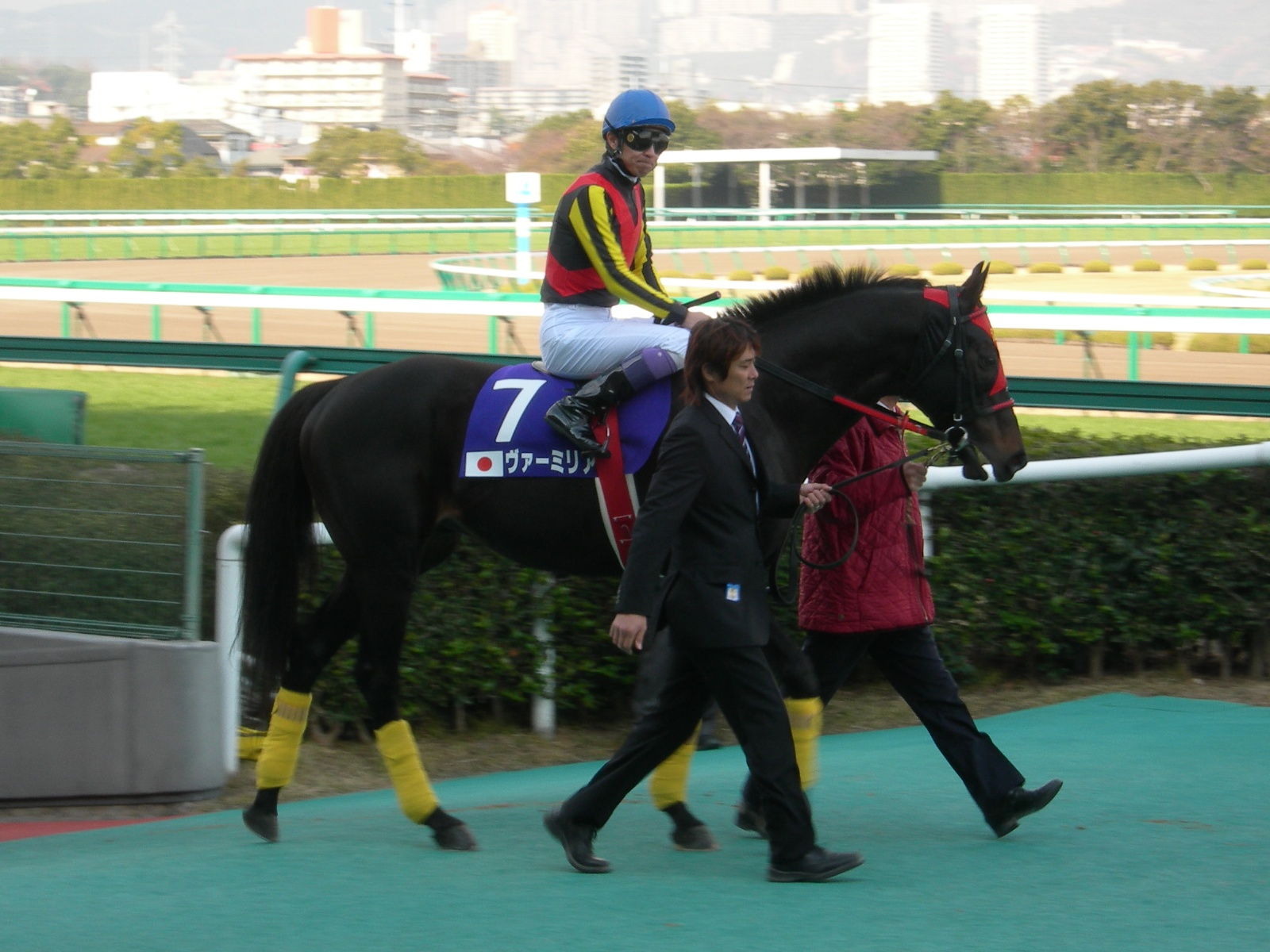
Vermilion at the 2007 Japan Cup Dirt

Vermilion quickly returned to the track in 2007, making his first start of the season in the Kawasaki Kinen. In this race, he ran side by side with older horse Adjudi Mitsuo the entire race until the final corner. He rallied and opened up a gap of six lengths, crossing the finish line in first. This was Vermilion's first Grade 1 victory, and jockey Lemaire told reporters, "I heard the horse was in good condition, so I was hoping to showcase his strengths. I thought Adjudi Mitsuo was a formidable opponent, so I decided to mark him. The feeling was good as we rounded the fourth corner,and I thought we communicated well the entire time. It was an overwhelming victory today."

His next race was to be the Dubai World Cup in March, and it would be his first overseas race. He arrived to Dubai on March 18, and he adjusted quickly to the new environment. Ishizaka said that, "I had a plan to work with the easy pace of 15 seconds per furlong and to finish strongly to cheer him up. He wanted to go from the beginning, but that's because he is so well. He is getting better than I saw him 10 days before, when he had just traveled over.". During the race, he tried to stay near the lead, but the field outsped him, leading him to race a little further back. He did not show speed in the final furlongs, and he finished fourth in a field of seven. He would not race again in the spring that year, and he returned in October in the JBC Classic at Ohi Racecourse. He won by four lengths over Furioso and jockey Yutaka Take remarked that "he was a good horse, and it was a good race." Ishizaka also mentioned that "going to Dubai made him mentally stronger."

Vermilion would remain undefeated the rest of the season. He won the Japan Cup Dirt in a blazing fast record time, and Take described the ride on him as "perfect". He would win the Tokyo Daishoten as his closer for the season, where he galloped to victory by four lengths over Furioso.

=== Six-year-old season (2008) ===
His six year old season began with a scratch in the Kawasaki Kinen out of an abundance of caution, however, he rebounded quickly and made a start in the February Stakes three weeks later. His connections were concerned about the distance being too short for him, but he made his move from the outside in the decisive moments and finished first by a length and a half. This marked his second G1 victory in the JRA circuit. Like the previous year, he would proceed to Dubai to compete in the Dubai World Cup once more as the team was determined to fare better this time around.

In the lead-up to the Dubai World Cup, his connections were incredibly confident in him despite initial trouble; his flight was delayed, and he had spiked a fever upon arrival in the country. The head of Sunday Racing's syndicate, Shinsuke Yoshida, believed "the horse was superior to what he was twelve months ago", and Ishizaka expressed faith in the horse's condition. The race did not go as planned for Vermilion and his connections; he finished twelfth and last, more than a hundred lengths behind the winner Curlin. Both Ishizaka and Take were shocked at the result. Trainer Ishizaka said that Vermilion may have been struggling to breathe following the race, and Take mentioned that he couldn't keep up with the pack.

Like the year before, he took an extended break in the summer and returned in the JBC Classic, where he repeated his win, this time at Sonoda Racecourse in a record time of 1:56.7 - a record that still stands as of 2026. Vermilion attempted to repeat his Japan Cup Dirt and Tokyo Daishoten victories as well, but both times was thwarted by Kane Hekili, who had returned to the track after two years off due to tendonitis.

=== Seven-year-old season (2009) ===
He raced in the February Stakes to start the season in search of a repeat victory, but finished 6th. It was his first off the board placement domestically in nearly three years. After this, he rested until the Teio Sho in June, which was contested over a heavy track. He left the field behind and won by three lengths, over half a second before the second place finisher crossed the wire.

In October, at the JBC Classic at Nagoya, Vermilion achieved a three-peat in the race that had not been achieved since Admire Don in 2004. As of 2026, him and Admire Don are the only two horses to achieve such a feat in this race. Two months later in December, he contested the Japan Cup Dirt, but faded in the stretch to finish eighth. He returned three weeks later for the end-of-year Tokyo Daishoten, and he finished a blindingly close second to Success Brocken.

=== Eight-year-old season (2010) ===
Vermilion's only win in 2010 came in the Kawasaki Kinen, which he had won before in 2007. He prevailed by a nose over Furioso. His win in the Kawasaki Kinen made nine G1s; at the time, the record for most G1s won by a single horse. The remainder of his starts resulted in off the board finishes; ninth in the Teio Sho in June and fourteenth in the Japan Cup Dirt respectively. Following his poor performance in the Japan Cup Dirt, the decision was made to retire him from racing.

== Retirement ==
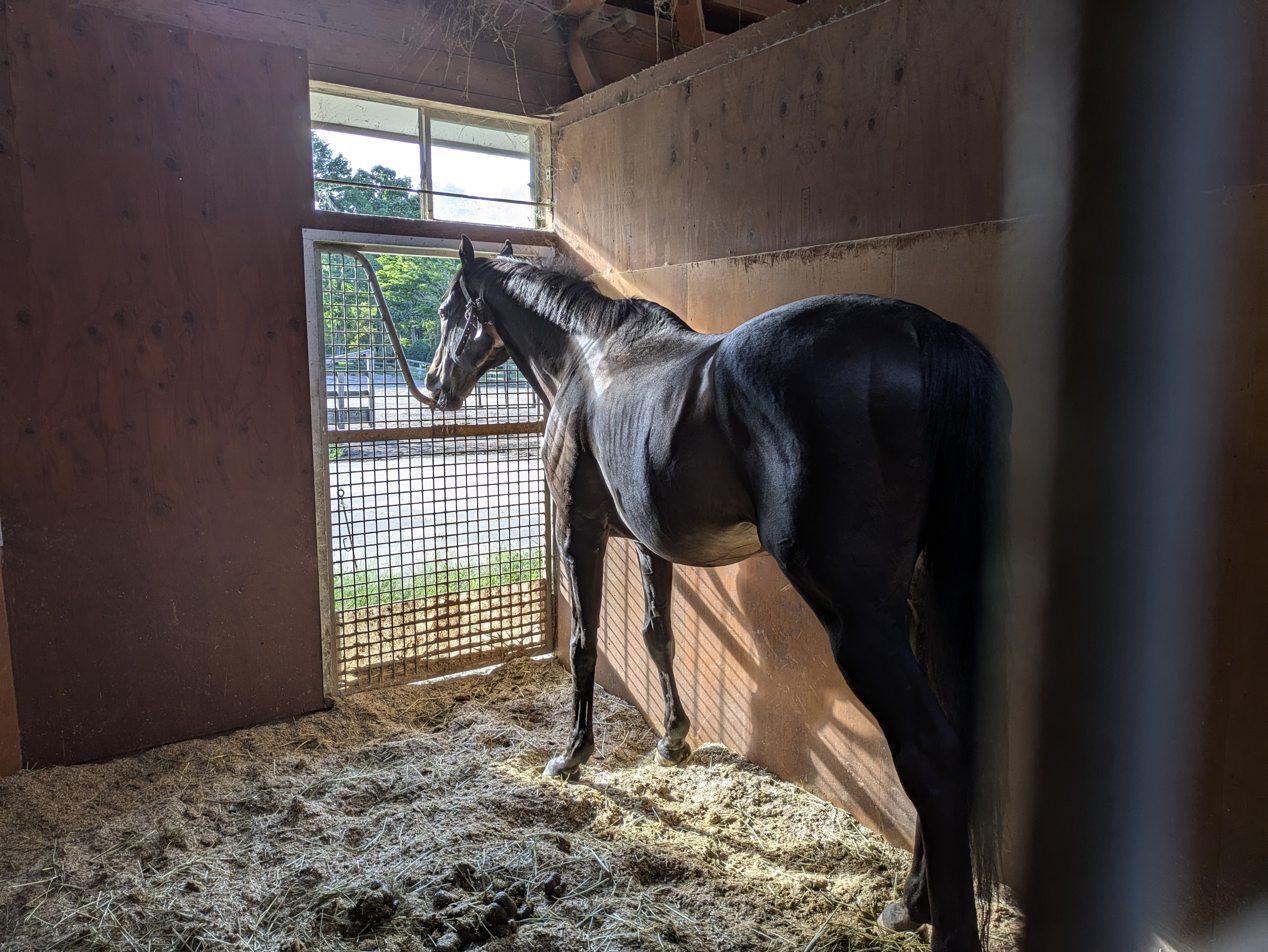
Vermilion at the Northern Horse Park in 2024

Vermilion was retired from racing on December 8, 2010 shortly following his 14th place finish in the Japan Cup Dirt - the reason for his retirement was cited as decline of performance due to old age. A retirement ceremony was held for him on December 18 at Hanshin Racecourse.

Following his retirement, he was syndicated for a total of 120 million yen, and became a stud at Shadai Stallion Station. He began his first season at stud with a fee of 500,000 yen. In 2013, they moved him to Breeder's Stallion Station in response to his popularity among breeders from the Hidaka region. Vermilion was moved locations once more in 2016, this time to East Stud. He would be at East Stud for only a year before he was retired from stud duty due to plummeting fertility rates.

He was then pensioned and retired to Northern Horse Park, where he would work as a riding horse until he died in 2024.

=== Notable progeny ===
c = colt, f = filly

| Foaled | Name | Sex | Major Wins |
| 2012 | Nobu Wild | c | Oval Sprint (2x) |
| 2012 | Not Formal | f | Fairy Stakes |
| 2012 | Rhein Schneider | c | Summer Champion |
| 2012 | Viscaria | f | TCK Jo-O Hai |
| 2015 | Ryuno Yukina | c | Tokyo Sprint (2x), Cluster Cup |

=== Death ===
On September 12, 2024 it was announced that Vermilion had been euthanized due to a sudden onset of severe colic - fans were welcomed to his stable at the farm to pay their respects and leave flowers and offerings.

== Racing form ==
Vermilion won 15 races and hit six more podium finishes out of 34 starts. This data is available from JBIS and netkeiba.

| Date | Track | Race | Grade | Distance (Condition) | Entry | HN | Odds (Favored) | Finish | Time | Margins | Jockey | Winner (Runner-up) |
|---|---|---|---|---|---|---|---|---|---|---|---|---|
2004 – two-year-old season
| Jul 31 | Kyoto | 2yo Newcomer | | 1,800 m (Firm) | 8 | 4 | 2.8 (1) | 1st | 1:51.8 | 0.6 | Yutaka Take | (Out of Sight) |
| Oct 30 | Kyoto | Hagi Stakes | OP | 1,800 m (Firm) | 8 | 1 | 1.5 (2) | 2nd | 1:48.7 | 0.1 | Yutaka Take | T.M. Hittobe |
| Nov 27 | Kyoto | Kyoto Nisai Stakes | OP | 2,000 m (Firm) | 10 | 10 | 3.1 (3) | 2nd | 2:04.9 | 0.2 | Yutaka Take | Rosenkreuz |
| Dec 25 | Hanshin | Radio Tampa Hai Nisai Stakes | GIII | 2,000 m (Firm) | 9 | 9 | 4.5 (2) | 1st | 2:03.5 | 0.2 | Yutaka Take | (Rosenkreuz) |
2005 – three-year-old season
| Mar 20 | Nakayama | Fuji TV Sho Spring Stakes | GII | 1,800 m (Firm) | 16 | 13 | 2.9 (2) | 14th | 1:49.6 | 2.3 | Hiroshi Kitamura | Dance in the More |
| Apr 17 | Nakayama | Satsuki Sho | GI | 2,000 m (Firm) | 18 | 5 | 22.4 (7) | 12th | 2:00.4 | 1.2 | Mirco Demuro | Deep Impact |
| 7 May | Kyoto | Kyoto Shimbun Hai | GII | 2,200 m (Good) | 15 | 11 | 9.8 (3) | 12th | 2:14.6 | 1.6 | Minoru Yoshida | Inti Raimi |
| 25 Sep | Hanshin | Kobe Shimbun Hai | GII | 2,000 m (Firm) | 13 | 3 | 71.2 | 10th | 2:01.0 | 2.6 | Yuichi Fukunaga | Deep Impact |
| 15 Oct | Kyoto | Enif Stakes | OP | 1,800 m (Good) | 16 | 6 | 10.8 (3) | 1st | 1:49.7 | 0.0 | Yutaka Take | (Don Cool) |
| 30 Nov | Urawa | Sai no Kuni Urawa Kinen | JpnII | 2,000 m (Fast) | 10 | 5 | (1) | 1st | 2:06.8 | –0.6 | Yutaka Take | (Hard Crystal) |
2006 – four-year-old season
| 22 Jan | Kyoto | Heian Stakes | GIII | 1,800 m (Fast) | 16 | 10 | 4.2 (2) | 2nd | 1:50.2 | 0.0 | Yutaka Take | Tagano Guernica |
| 19 Feb | Tokyo | February Stakes | GI | 1,600 m (Fast) | 16 | 8 | 6.3 (3) | 5th | 1:35.8 | 0.9 | Christophe Lemaire | Kane Hekili |
| 15 Mar | Funabashi | Diolite Kinen | JpnII | 2,400 m (Fast) | 10 | 6 | (1) | 1st | 2:34.9 | –1.3 | Hiroyuki Uchida | (Personal Rush) |
| 21 May | Chukyo | Tokai Stakes | GII | 2,300 m (Fast) | 13 | 12 | 1.8 (1) | 13th | 2:28.5 | 4.9 | Hideaki Miyuki | Hard Crystal |
| 25 Nov | Tokyo | Japan Cup Dirt | GI | 2,100 m (Fast) | 15 | 1 | 20.0 (9) | 4th | 2.09.0 | 0.5 | Christophe Lemaire | Alondite |
| 20 Dec | Nagoya | Nagoya Grand Prix | JpnII | 2,500 m (Fast) | 11 | 11 | 1.4 (1) | 1st | 2:44.3 | –1.3 | Christophe Lemaire | (Redstone) |
2007 – five-year-old season
| 31 Jan | Kawasaki | Kawasaki Kinen | JpnI | 2,100 m (Fast) | 13 | 7 | 1.7 (1) | 1st | 2:12.9 | –1.3 | Christophe Lemaire | (Adjudi Mitsuo) |
| 31 Mar | Nad al Sheba | Dubai World Cup | GI | 2,000 m (Fast) | 12 | 7 | 33–1 (6) | 4th | 2.02.6 | 1.0 | Christophe Lemaire | Invasor |
| 31 Oct | Ohi | JBC Classic | JpnI | 2,000 m (Fast) | 16 | 6 | 3.2 (2) | 1st | 2:04.8 | –0.7 | Yutaka Take | (Furioso) |
| 24 Nov | Tokyo | Japan Cup Dirt | GI | 2,100 m (Fast) | 16 | 7 | 2.3 (1) | 1st | R2:06.7 (Note: indicates that it was a record time finish) | –0.2 | Yutaka Take | (Field Rouge) |
| 29 Dec | Ohi | Tokyo Daishoten | JpnI | 2,000 m (Sloppy) | 15 | 13 | 1.3 (1) | 1st | 2:03.2 | –0.7 | Yutaka Take | (Furioso) |
2008 – six-year-old season
| 30 Jan | Kawasaki | Kawasaki Kinen | JpnI | 2,100 m (Good) | 12 | 7 | – | Scratched | – | – | Yutaka Take | Field Rouge |
| 24 Feb | Tokyo | February Stakes | GI | 1,600 m (Fast) | 16 | 15 | 2.3 (1) | 1st | 1:35.3 | –0.3 | Yutaka Take | (Blue Concorde) |
| 29 Mar | Nad al Sheba | Dubai World Cup | GI | 2,000 m (Fast) | 12 | 7 | 9–1 (3) | 12th | 2:08.0 | 6.8 | Yutaka Take | Curlin |
| 3 Nov | Sonoda | JBC Classic | JpnI | 1,870 m (Fast) | 12 | 2 | 1.9 (1) | 1st | R1:56.7 | –0.1 | Yutaka Take | (Success Brocken) |
| 7 Dec | Hanshin | Japan Cup Dirt | GI | 1,800 m (Fast) | 15 | 6 | 2.2 (1) | 3rd | 1:49.3 | 0.1 | Yasunari Iwata | Kane Hekili |
| 29 Dec | Ohi | Tokyo Daishoten | JpnI | 2,000 m (Fast) | 10 | 1 | 1.6 (1) | 2nd | 2:04.5 | 0.0 | Yutaka Take | Kane Hekili |
2009 – seven-year-old season
| 22 Feb | Tokyo | February Stakes | GI | 1,600 m (Good) | 16 | 9 | 4.1 (2) | 6th | 1:35.1 | 0.5 | Yutaka Take | Success Brocken |
| 24 Jun | Ohi | Teio Sho | JpnI | 2,000 m (Sloppy) | 13 | 4 | 1.6 (1) | 1st | 2:03.6 | –0.5 | Yutaka Take | (Furioso) |
| 3 Nov | Nagoya | JBC Classic | JpnI | 1,900 m (Fast) | 12 | 5 | 1.3 (1) | 1st | 2:00.2 | 0.0 | Yutaka Take | (Makoto Sparviero) |
| 6 Dec | Hanshin | Japan Cup Dirt | GI | 1,800 m (Fast) | 16 | 4 | 3.7 (2) | 8th | 1:51.1 | 1.2 | Yutaka Take | Espoir City |
| 29 Dec | Ohi | Tokyo Daishoten | JpnI | 2,000 m (Fast) | 14 | 13 | 2.0 (1) | 2nd | 2:05.9 | 0.0 | Yutaka Take | Success Brocken |
2010 – eight-year-old season
| 27 Jan | Kawasaki | Kawasaki Kinen | JpnI | 2,100 m (Fast) | 11 | 2 | 1.3 (1) | 1st | 2:12:7 | –0.1 | Yutaka Take | (Furioso) |
| 30 Jun | Ohi | Teio Sho | JpnI | 2,000 m (Good) | 15 | 3 | 2.8 (2) | 9th | 2:05.3 | 1.9 | Yuichi Fukunaga | Furioso |
| 5 Dec | Hanshin | Japan Cup Dirt | GI | 1,800 m (Good) | 16 | 10 | 9.2 (4) | 14th | 1:52.1 | 3.2 | Yutaka Take | Transcend |

Legend:
Dirt Turf

== Pedigree ==
Pedigree of Vermilion
| Sire El Condor Pasa 1995 dk. b. | Kingmambo; 1990 b. | Mr. Prospector | Raise a Native |
| Sire El Condor Pasa 1995 dk. b. | Kingmambo; 1990 b. | Mr. Prospector | Gold Digger |
| Sire El Condor Pasa 1995 dk. b. | Kingmambo; 1990 b. | Miesque | Nureyev |
| Sire El Condor Pasa 1995 dk. b. | Kingmambo; 1990 b. | Miesque | Pasadoble |
| Sire El Condor Pasa 1995 dk. b. | Saddlers Gal; 1989 b. | Sadler's Wells | Northern Dancer |
| Sire El Condor Pasa 1995 dk. b. | Saddlers Gal; 1989 b. | Sadler's Wells | Fairy Bridge |
| Sire El Condor Pasa 1995 dk. b. | Saddlers Gal; 1989 b. | Glenveagh | Seattle Slew |
| Sire El Condor Pasa 1995 dk. b. | Saddlers Gal; 1989 b. | Glenveagh | Lisadell |
| Dam Scarlet Lady 1995 dk. b. | Sunday Silence; 1986 dk. b. | Halo | Hail to Reason |
| Dam Scarlet Lady 1995 dk. b. | Sunday Silence; 1986 dk. b. | Halo | Cosmah |
| Dam Scarlet Lady 1995 dk. b. | Sunday Silence; 1986 dk. b. | Wishing Well | Understanding |
| Dam Scarlet Lady 1995 dk. b. | Sunday Silence; 1986 dk. b. | Wishing Well | Mountain Flower |
| Dam Scarlet Lady 1995 dk. b. | Scarlet Rose; 1987 ch. | Northern Taste | Northern Dancer |
| Dam Scarlet Lady 1995 dk. b. | Scarlet Rose; 1987 ch. | Northern Taste | Lady Victoria |
| Dam Scarlet Lady 1995 dk. b. | Scarlet Rose; 1987 ch. | Scarlet Ink | Crimson Satan |
| Dam Scarlet Lady 1995 dk. b. | Scarlet Rose; 1987 ch. | Scarlet Ink | Consentida (Family 4-d) |

- Vermilion is inbred 5x4x4 to Northern Dancer and 5x5x4 to the full siblings Special and Lisadell. This means that those horses appear multiple times within his pedigree, in the fourth and fifth generations.
