= Diolite Kinen =

Japanese thoroughbred race

Diolite Kinen ダイオライト記念
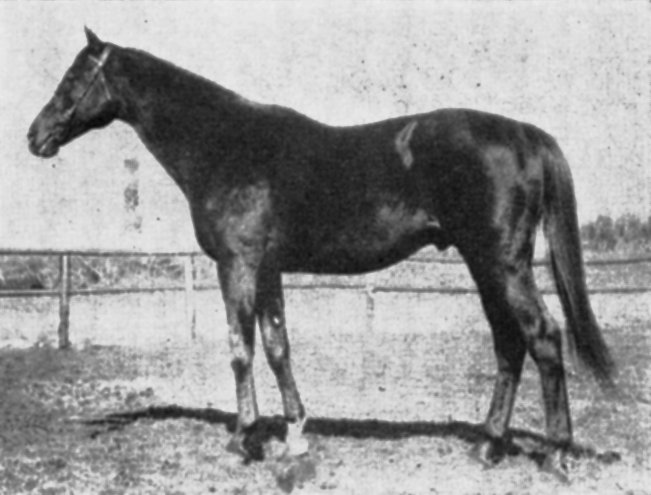
- Diolite(1927-1951)
- Class: Domestic Grade II (JpnII)
- Location: Funabashi Racecourse
- Inaugurated: 1956
- Race type: Thoroughbred - Flat racing

Race information
- Distance: 2,400 meters (1.5 mi)
- Surface: Dirt
- Track: Left-handed
- Qualification: Four-year-olds and above
- Weight: 57 kg (4yo+); Allowances; 2 kg for fillies and mares
- Purse: 1st: ¥32,000,000

The Diolite Kinen (ダイオライト記念), is a Domestic Grade 2 horse race for four-year-olds at Funabashi Racecourse in Japan.

== Race details ==
The first edition of the race took place on March 15, 1956.

The race has been held in March since its inception.

The race is named after the racehorse, Diolite.

== Winners since 2015 ==
Winners since 2015 include:

Year	Winner	Jockey	Trainer	Time
2015	Chrysolite	Yutaka Take	Hidetaka Otonashi	2:33.6
2016	Chrysolite	Yutaka Take	Hidetaka Otonashi	2:36.4
2017	Chrysolite	Yutaka Take	Hidetaka Otonashi	2:37.8
2018	K T Brave	Yuichi Fukunaga	Haruki Sugiyama	2:34.8
2019	Chuwa Wizard	Yuga Kawada	Ryuji Okubo	2:37.3
2020	Another Truth	Christophe Lemaire	Noboru Takagi	2:36.6
2021	Danon Pharaoh	Yuga Kawada	Yoshito Yahagi	2:34.5
2022	Nova Lenda	Taito Mori	Katsuyoshi Ushida	2:37.2
2023	Gloria Mundi	Yuga Kawada	Ryuji Okubo	2:37.2
2024	Seraphic Call	Bauyrzhan Murzabayev	Katsuyoshi Uchida	2:33.9
2025	Seraphic Call	Mirco Demuro	Katsuyoshi Uchida	2:34.7
2026	Odilon	Tomohiro Yoshimura	Tomotaka Morisawa	2:37.2

== Past winners ==
Past winners include:

- 1956: Frisco Dow
- 1957: Cosmo Light
- 1958: Vaiola
- 1959: Shear
- 1960: Opal O
- 1961: Daisan Kotobuki
- 1962: Daini Kotobuki
- 1963: Seoul Utopia
- 1964: Gayling
- 1965: Daisy Masaru
- 1966: Hide Midori
- 1967: Hidemidori
- 1968: Shinto
- 1969: Takedembo
- 1970: Apo Speed
- 1971: Owners Ratsk
- 1972: San Hiko
- 1973: Maruichi King
- 1974: Daini Katsuharu
- 1975: Maruichi Daio
- 1976: Hideno Arashi
- 1977: Hoyu Hidaka
- 1978: Edo Noboru
- 1979: Edo Noboru
- 1980: Katsu R
- 1981: Hokkai Satsuken
- 1982: Hokkai Satsuken
- 1983: Kuri Dancers
- 1984: Humour Ace
- 1985: Rocky Tiger
- 1986: Island Telios
- 1987: Island Hunter
- 1988: Kurino Sandford
- 1989: High Ace Boy
- 1990: Fujino Dancer
- 1991: Nihon Bellezza
- 1992: Hase Katsu Top
- 1993: Mogami Kikka
- 1994: Hase Katsu Top
- 1995: Aqua Raiden
- 1996: Hokuto Vega
- 1997: Duke Grand Prix
- 1998: Abukuma Poro
- 1999: Abukuma Poro
- 2000: My Turn
- 2001: Regent Bluff
- 2002: Intelli Power
- 2003: Kanetsu Fleuve
- 2004: Mitsuaki Turbine
- 2005: Personal Rush
- 2006: Vermilion
- 2007: Kikuno Arrow
- 2008: Furioso
- 2009: Furioso
- 2010: Fusaichi Seven
- 2011: Smart Falcon
- 2012: Renforcer
- 2013: Osumi Ichiban
- 2014: Nihonpiro Ours

== See also ==
- Horse racing in Japan
- List of Japanese flat horse races
