= Nagoya Racecourse =

Racecourse in Yatomi, Aichi, Japan

Coordinates: 35°06′46″N 136°52′01″E

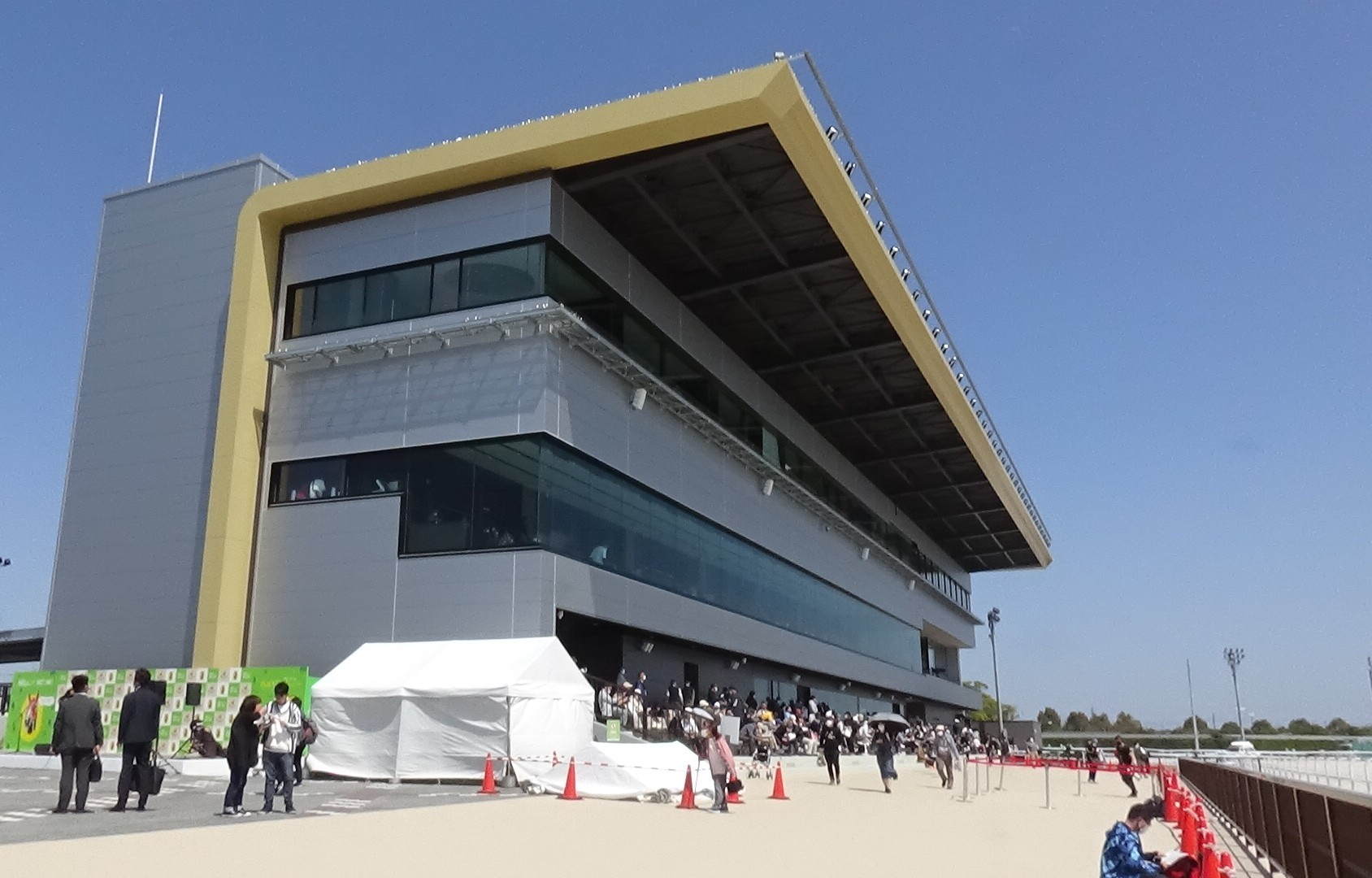
- The apron of Nagoya Racecourse
- Interactive map of Nagoya Racecourse
- Location: 1 Komano-cho, Yatomi, Aichi, Japan
- Owned by: Aichi Horse Racing Association
- Operated by: Aichi Horse Racing Association
- Date opened: June 1949; March 22, 2022 (current location)
- Course type: 1180m dirt
- Notable races: Nagoya Grand Prix (JpnII) Kakitsubata Kinen (JpnII) Nagoya Daishoten (JpnIII)

Nagoya Racecourse (名古屋競馬場, Nagoya Keiba-jō) is located in Yatomi, Aichi, Japan, and runs under National Association of Racing. It is a 1100-meter dirt oval with 193.5m stretch. It is also commonly known as Donko Racecourse, after the surrounding district. In 2017 it was announced that the Nagoya Racecourse would move from its original location in Nagoya and to a new location in Yatomi. In March 11, 2022, the old Nagoya Racecourse held its last race before moving to Yatomi. On March 22, 2022, the new racecourse was formally opened, with races being officially held starting from April 8.

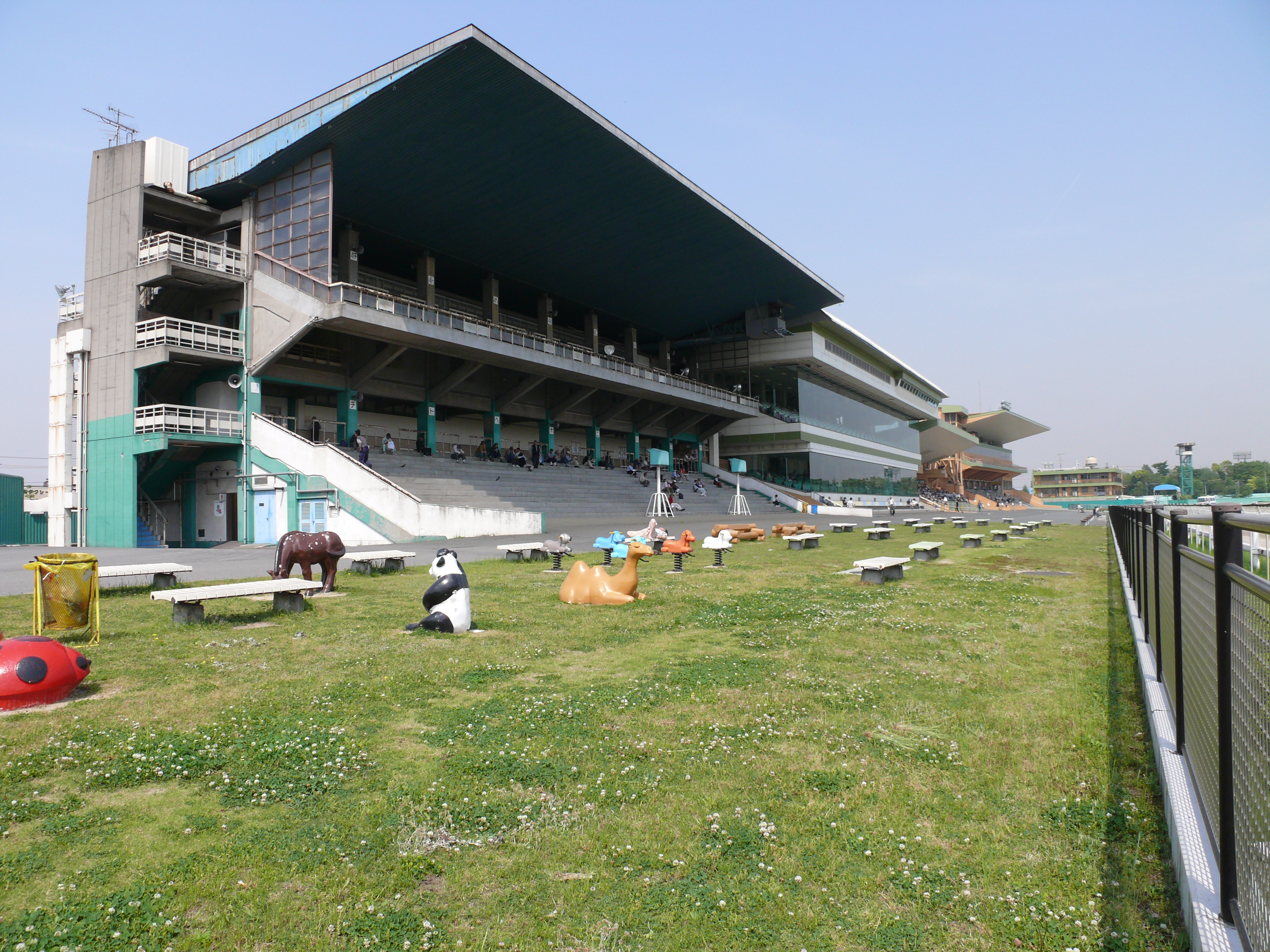
An image of the apron of the old racecourse taken in May, 2007.

== Notable races ==
The only stakes races run at Nagoya Racecourse are listed races.

Race Name	Age/Sex	Grading	Distance
Nagoya Daishoten	4+yo	JpnII	1900m
Kakitsubata Kinen	4+ yo	JpnII	1400m
Nagoya Grand Prix	3+ yo	JpnIII	2500m

In addition, the JBC Sprint and JBC Classic were held at the old racecourse in 2005 and 2009.

== See also ==
- National Association of Racing
