= Ushba Tesoro =

Japanese thoroughbred racehorse

Ushba Tesoro ウシュバテソーロ
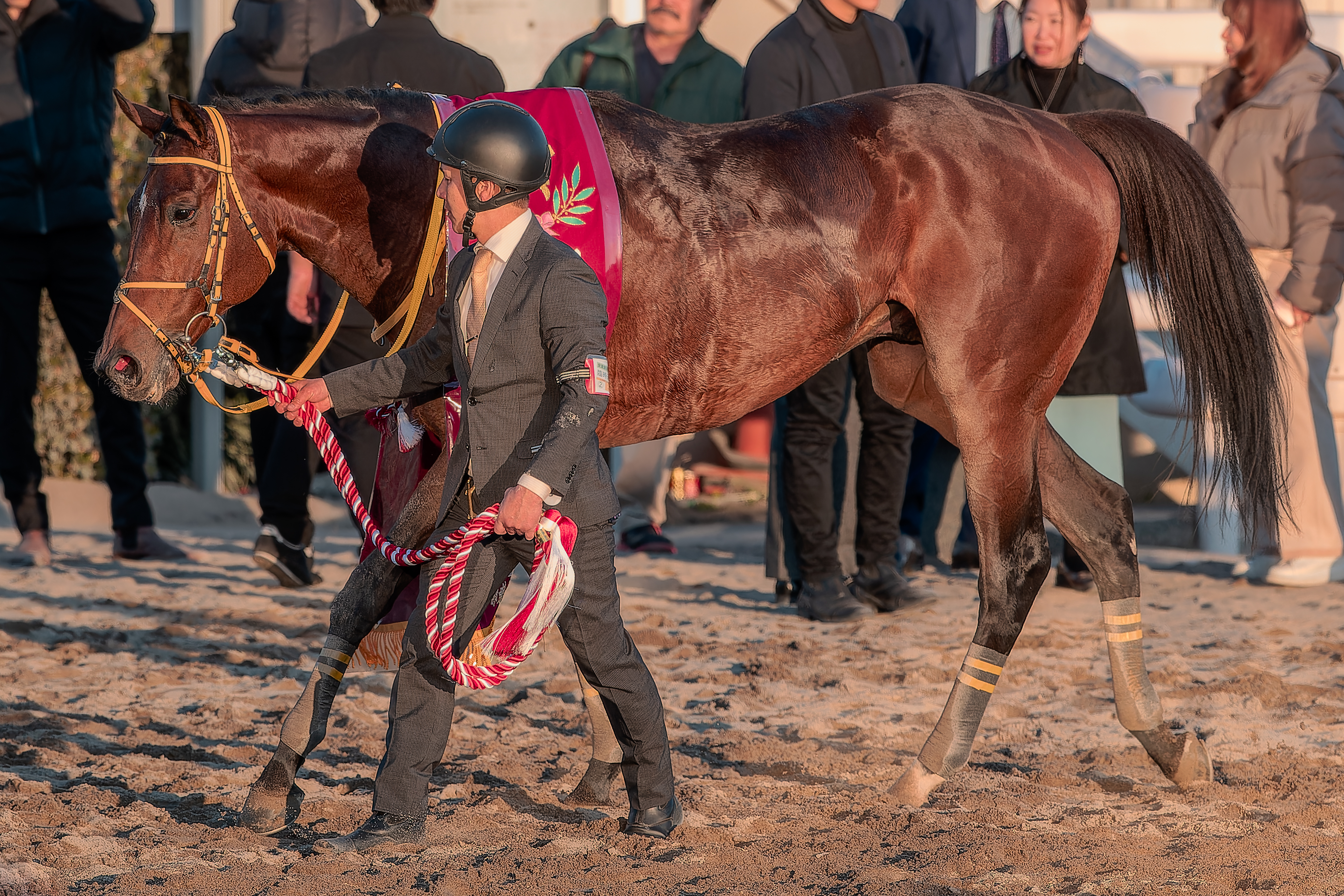
- Ushba Tesoro after winning the 2023 Tokyo Daishōten
- Breed: Thoroughbred
- Sire: Orfevre
- Grandsire: Stay Gold
- Dam: Millefeui Attach
- Damsire: King Kamehameha
- Sex: Stallion
- Foaled: March 4, 2017 (age 9)
- Country: Japan
- Colour: Bay
- Breeder: Chiyoda Farm
- Owner: Kenji Ryotokuji Holdings
- Racing colours
- Trainer: Noboru Takagi
- Jockey: Kazuo Yokoyama; Yuga Kawada
- Record: 39:11-4-6
- Earnings: ¥2,601,311,100 (Note: Earnings earned overseas are converted to JPY using the formula provided by JRA by year: 2023, 2024, 2025.); Japan：¥463,884,000 JPY （JRA）¥119,884,000 JPY （NAR）¥344,000,000 JPY; Overseas：US$15,110,000 （UAE）：$9,600,000 USD （USA）：$250,000 USD （KSA）：$5,500,000 USD

Major wins
- Tokyo Daishōten (2022, 2023); Kawasaki Kinen (2023); Dubai World Cup (2023); Nippon TV Hai (2023)

Awards
- JRA Special Award (2023); NAR Dirt Grace Race Special Award (2023)

Ushba Tesoro (Japanese: ウシュバテソーロ, Hepburn: Ushuba Tesōro; foaled March 4, 2017) is a Japanese thoroughbred racehorse who won the Tokyo Daishōten in 2022, before going on to win the Kawasaki Kinen and the Dubai World Cup in 2023.

The name "Ushba" is derived from a mountain in Georgia, while "Tesoro" is the eponym (冠名; kanmei) used by his owner.

== Racing career ==
=== Up until his four-year-old season (2021) ===
Ushba Tesoro was bought by Kenji Ryotokuji, founder of Ryotokuji University, at the JRHA Select Sale Foal Session for 25 million yen.

He would make his debut at a maiden race on August 25, 2019, at the Niigata Racecourse, finishing in fifth place.

Ushba Tesoro would win his first race after seven unsuccessful races at a maiden race held at Tokyo Racecourse. The following month, the horse entered the Principal Stakes, a trial race for the Japanese Derby, but came in fourth place. The horse would return to allowance races but could not win a second race for the rest of that year.

On his third race of his four-year old season, Ushba Tesoro won his first race in over a year. Later that year, on November, he scored his third victory at the Sanriku Tokubetsu.

=== 2022: Five-year-old season ===
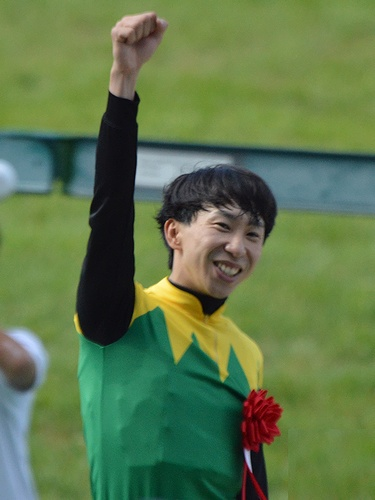
Ushba Tesoro's jockey Kazuo Yokoyama

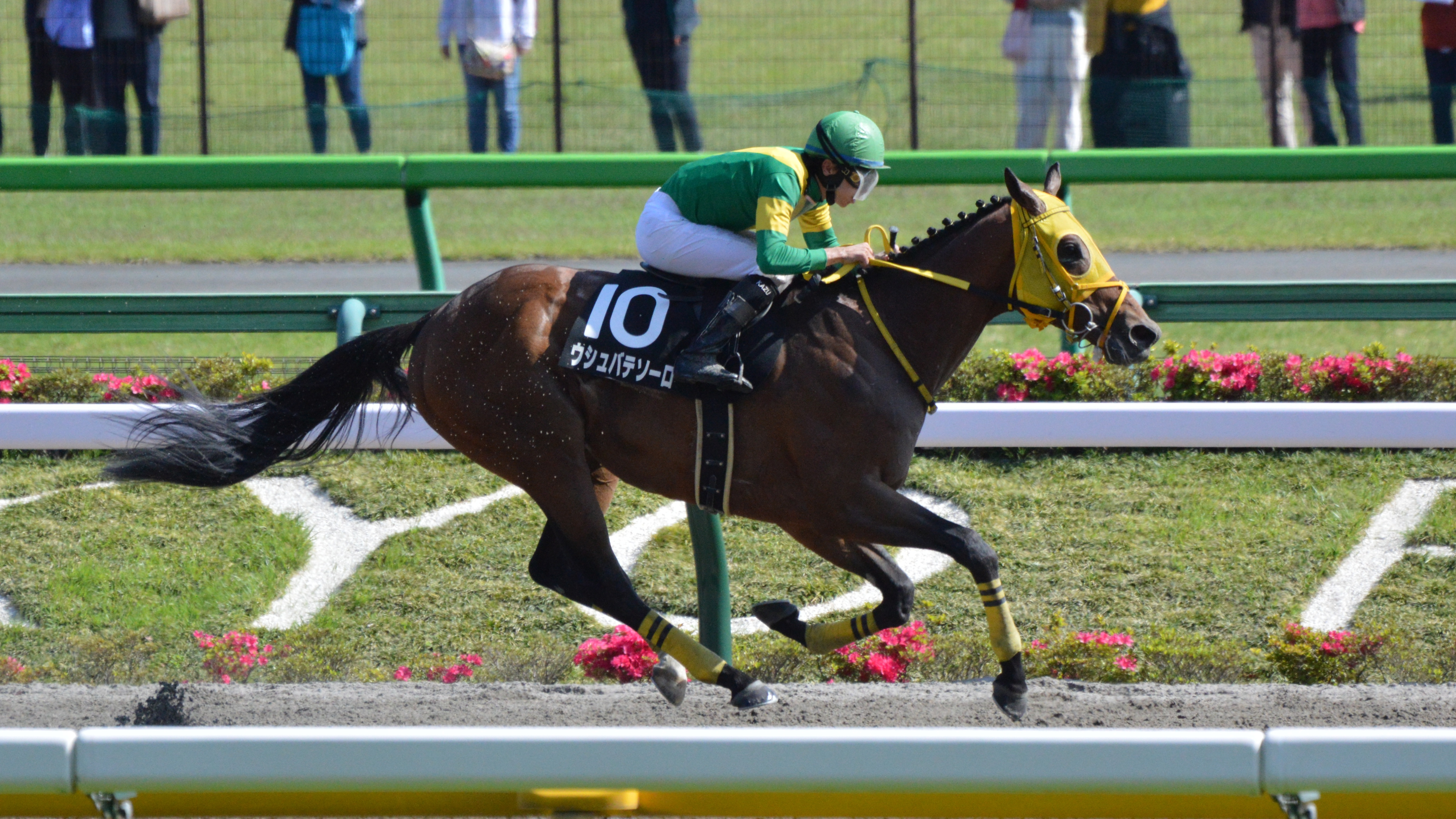
Ushba Tesoro winning the Yokohama Stakes in 2022

Ushba Tesoro ran three allowance races but lost all three of them. After coming in 6th place in the last of those three, it was decided that the horse's next race would be on a dirt track. On April 30, Ushba Tesoro entered the Yokohama Stakes (dirt 2100m) and was the 7th favored. Once the race started, Ushba Tesoro passed all the other horses from the back on the final stretch, finishing his first dirt race in a victory.

On the Radio Nippon Sho in September, the horse came up from 10th place and covered the last three furlongs the fastest but came in third place.

The following month, Ushba Tesoro won his first Listed Race at the Brazil Cup, where he covered the last three furlongs at 35.5 seconds and passed all the other horses from behind. Ushba Tesoro won his next race. the Canopus Stakes, as well in a similar fashion, where he came in from 10th place and passed the other horses in the final stretch, covering the last three furlongs in 37.3 seconds.

Ushba Tesoro would run his first group race at the end of the year at the Tokyo Daishoten, which doubled as the horse's first Group I race. The horse went in as the second most favored behind Meisho Hario, the winner of that year's Teio Sho, another 2000m dirt race held at Oi Racecourse. The horse stayed with the group for most of the race, and started to go forward as it went around the fourth corner. The horse went from the outside and passed the likes of Shonan Nadeshiko and Sunrise Hope that was running in front of him, and crossed the finish line with a 1.75 lengths gap behind Notturno, who came in second place. This victory marked his first group race win and Group 1 win for the horse, after just five races on the dirt track. The horse covered the last 3 furlongs at 37.2 seconds, once again the fastest of the entrants. This race also marked the first dirt G1 race win for the horse's jockey, Kazuo Yokoyama.

=== 2023: Six-year-old season ===
Ushba Tesoro started the season with the Kawasaki Kinen. In that race, he ran with the pack, and quickly took the lead after passing the final corner, winning his second Group 1 race with a half-a-length lead behind T O Keynes.

On February 24, it was officially announced that the horse was invited to that year's Dubai World Cup. As Yokoyama was already scheduled to ride Titleholder at the Nikkei Sho as well as Aguri on the Takamatsunomiya Kinen, it was also announced that Yuga Kawada would be riding the horse in Dubai. At the race, Ushba Tesoro trailed the pack from behind for most of the duration, coming up and passing them from behind on the final stretch. This victory marked the first time since Victoire Pisa in 2011 for a Japanese horse to win the race, and the first time ever that a Japanese horse won the race since the race was switched from track surface to dirt. During the post-race interview, Kawada commented "There were hurdles to overcome in logistics and surfaces, as it was the horse's first time abroad, but the horse moved very well during training, so I focused on whether it can channel that in this race when I rode him" and "Ushba Tesoro worked hard to win the number one race in the world, so I'm proud that I was able to show that a Japanese jockey can fight in the global stage."

On mid-April 2023, Ushba Tesoro's trainer announced that after taking a break for the summer, the horse will run at this year's Nippon TV Hai before moving on to the BC Classic in Santa Anita. Kawada would reprise his role as jockey. On September 27, he returned to race as scheduled in Nippon TV Hai. After breaking out of the gates well, the race progressed as he was traveling around third or fourth position along the way, stalking the leader Mitono O. As he approached the fourth corner, he surged to the front, and with a light urging from Kawada, he won by 2 and a half lengths. After that, he arrived in Santa Anita without any issues and was set to race in the BC Classic on November 4. He ran the race from the last position after a slow start. Approaching the home straight, Kawada pushed him up from the back of the pack to chase the leaders, however, he was unable to chase them down and finished 5th, breaking his winning streak. He went home to Japan afterward and it was decided that he would run at the Tokyo Daishoten again if his condition was good. Additionally, his connections plan to continue his career next year, aiming for a consecutive victory in the Dubai World Cup. In the Tokyo Daishoten, he was held back from the start and until the final straight where he caught Wilson Tesoro in his final strides, achieving consecutive victories of the race. He was the fifth horse to win the race consecutively since Omega Perfume from 2018 to 2021. With his achievements in winning the Tokyo Daishoten consecutively and winning the Dubai World Cup, he was awarded the JRA Special Award and the NAR Dirt Grade Race Special Award of the year.

=== 2024: Seven-year-old season ===
Ushba Tesoro started his seven-year-old season in the Saudi Cup. Amidst the intense competition for the lead in the race, he sat at the back of the pack as usual. Gradually closing the gap around the third corner, he began to move up in the straight, overtaking the strong frontrunner, Saudi Crown and took the lead, but was overtaken by Senor Buscador from the outside just 50 meters from the goal, finishing second. He earned approximately 500 million yen by placing second, surpassing Panthalassa and T M Opera O with his total prize money amounting to 1,876,317,000 yen, ranking fourth in Japanese horseracing history.

On March 30, he ran as scheduled at the Dubai World Cup to defend his title. He ran from behind as usual, but he was unable to chase down the tearaway leader, Laurel River, who had a huge comfortable lead, he finished second place. With the money he earned in this race by placing second, he surpassed Equinox, becoming the highest-earning horse in Japanese history with his prize money amounting to 2,215,678,200 yen.

== Racing statistics ==
The following statistics is based on data available at netkeiba.com, JBIS Search, Emirates Racing Authority, and Total Performance Data.

Date	Track	Name	Grade	Distance (Condition)	Entry	HN	Odds (Favored)	Finish	Time	Margins	Jockey	Winner (2nd Place)
2019 – two-year-old season
Aug 25	Niigata	2YO Newcomer		1,800 m (Firm)	12	1	12.9 (5)	5th	1:50.6	0.6	Takuya Ono	Liguge
Sep 16	Nakayama	2YO Maiden		2,000 m (Yielding)	10	4	8.6 (4)	4th	2:03.4	0.6	Takuya Ono	Colombe d'Or
Dec 14	Nakayama	2YO Maiden		2,000 m (Firm)	17	15	27.8 (8)	5th	2:01.5	0.7	Teruo Eda	Xenoverse
2020 – three-year-old season
Jan 6	Nakayama	3YO Maiden		2,000 m (Firm)	16	9	6.8 (4)	3rd	2:02.5	0.3	Teruo Eda	Flowering Night
Jan 25	Nakayama	3YO Maiden		2,200 m (Firm)	15	6	4.9 (2)	3rd	2:17.4	0.6	Teruo Eda	Kanbala
Feb 8	Tokyo	3YO Maiden		2,400 m (Firm)	14	9	5.3 (3)	3rd	2:27.8	0.6	Teruo Eda	Eternal Bond
Apr 26	Tokyo	3YO Maiden		2,400 m (Firm)	8	4	2.3 (1)	1st	2:28.5	-0.2	Teruo Eda	(Edono Felice)
May 9	Tokyo	Principal Stakes	L	2,000 m (Firm)	11	5	59.4 (8)	4th	2:00.5	0.7	Teruo Eda	Bitter Ender
May 30	Tokyo	3YO Allowance	1 win	2,400 m (Firm)	9	6	5.2 (3)	4th	2:24.8	0.7	Teruo Eda	Anticipate
Aug 15	Sapporo	3YO+ Allowance	1 win	2,600 m (Good)	8	6	2.3 (1)	5th	2:43.8	1.4	Takuya Ono	Hishi Elegance
Aug 29	Sapporo	Rusutsu Tokubetsu	1 win	2,600 m (Firm)	10	10	14.3 (5)	9th	2:44.9	2.0	Takuya Ono	Win Kiitos
Sep 20	Nakayama	3YO+ Allowance	1 win	2,500 m (Firm)	14	4	11.5 (5)	9th	2:37.3	1.6	Teruo Eda	Baie des Anges
2021 – four-year-old season
Mar 21	Nakayama	4YO+ Allowance	1 win	2,000 m (Yielding)	16	1	53.2 (13)	2nd	2:04.6	0.3	Ikuya Kowata	Lovinger
Apr 17	Nakayama	4YO+ Allowance	1 win	2,200 m (Firm)	15	9	8.7 (3)	3rd	2:14.6	0.4	Ikuya Kowata	Arata
May 8	Niigata	4YO+ Allowance	1 win	2,200 m (Firm)	11	7	1.9 (1)	1st	2:15.8	-0.5	Katsuma Sameshima	(Pole to Win)
Oct 3	Nakayama	Ibaraki Shimbun Hai	2 wins	1,800 m (Firm)	12	1	12.8 (5)	6th	1:47.6	0.6	Keita Tosaki	Variamente
Oct 16	Tokyo	3YO+ Allowance	2 wins	2,400 m (Firm)	8	1	9.1 (5)	4th	2:29.0	0.3	Keita Tosaki	Plume d'Or
Nov 7	Fukushima	Sanriku Tokubetsu	2 wins	2,600 m (Firm)	16	9	11.5 (6)	1st	2:40.9	0.0	Hiroto Mayuzumi	(Wolf's Howl)
Dec 25	Nakayama	Grateful Stakes	3 wins	2,500 m (Good)	10	7	13.6 (5)	4th	2:34.3	0.3	Hiroto Mayuzumi	(Veloce Oro)
2022 – five-year-old season
Jan 10	Nakayama	Geishun Stakes	3 wins	2,200 m (Firm)	15	10	24.6 (10)	5th	2:15.1	0.4	Keita Tosaki	Smile
Feb 5	Tokyo	Soshun Stakes	3 wins	2,400 m (Firm)	14	4	25.5 (8)	11th	2:26.8	1.7	Teruo Eda	Heart's Histoire
Apr 3	Nakayama	Miho Stakes	3 wins	2,000 m (Good)	9	6	16.0 (6)	6th	2:02.3	0.2	Kazuo Yokoyama	Evergarden
Apr 30	Tokyo	Yokohama Stakes	3 wins	2,100 m (Muddy)	14	10	15.6 (7)	1st	2:08.1	-0.7	Kazuo Yokoyama	(Peptide Nile)
Sep 18	Nakayama	Radio Nippon Sho	OP	1,800 m (Standard)	16	13	8.2 (4)	3rd	1:50.7	0.4	Takuya Kowata	Ashaka Tobu
Oct 23	Tokyo	Brazil Cup	L	2,100 m (Standard)	15	11	2.8 (1)	1st	2:10.0	-0.3	Takuya Kowata	(Vaisravana)
Nov 27	Hanshin	Canopus Stakes	OP	2,000 m (Good)	16	3	3.0 (1)	1st	2:03.7	-0.4	Kazuo Yokoyama	(History Maker)
Dec 29	Oi	Tokyo Daishoten	1	2,000 m (Standard)	14	6	4.3 (2)	1st	2:05.0	-0.3	Kazuo Yokoyama	(Notturno)
2023 – six-year-old season
Feb 1	Kawasaki	Kawasaki Kinen	JpnI (Note: The Kawasaki Kinen is classified as a local, Japanese Grade 1 event. Internationally as a Listed event.)	2,100 m (Standard)	10	5	2.6 (2)	1st	2:16.0	-0.1	Kazuo Yokoyama	(T O Keynes)
Mar 25	Meydan	Dubai World Cup	1	2,000 m (Standard)	15	14	9.6 (4)	1st	2:03.25	--	Yuga Kawada	(Algiers)
Sep 27	Funabashi	Nippon TV Hai	JpnII (Note: The Nippon TV Hai is classified as a local, Japanese Grade 2 event. Internationally as a Listed event.)	1,800 m (Standard)	11	4	1.6 (1)	1st	1:51.7	-0.5	Yuga Kawada	(Tenkaharu)
Nov 4	Santa Anita	Breeders' Cup Classic	1	2,000 m (Standard)	12	8	2.1 (1)	5th	--	--	Yuga Kawada	White Abarrio
Dec 29	Oi	Tokyo Daishōten	1	2,000 m (Standard)	9	5	1.7 (1)	1st	2:07.3	-0.1	Yuga Kawada	(Wilson Tesoro)
2024 – seven-year-old season
Feb 24	King Abdulaziz	Saudi Cup	1	1,800 m (Standard)	14	13	4.9 (2)	2nd	1:49.51	0	Yuga Kawada	Senor Buscador
Mar 30	Meydan	Dubai World Cup	1	2,000 m (Standard)	12	11	4.05 (2)	2nd	2:03.86	1.5	Yuga Kawada	Laurel River
Sep 25	Funabashi	Nippon TV Hai	JpnII (Note: The Nippon TV Hai is classified as a local, Japanese Grade 2 event. Internationally as a Listed event.)	1,800 m (Standard)	13	4	1.4 (1)	2nd	1:53.0	0.2	Yuga Kawada	William Barows
Nov 3	Del Mar	Breeder's Cup Classic	1	2,000 m (Standard)	14	7	24.40 (9)	10th	--	--	Yuga Kawada	Sierra Leone
Dec 29	Oi	Tokyo Daishōten	1	2,000 m (Standard)	10	10	8.3 (3)	4th	2:05.9	1.0	Akira Sugawara	Forever Young
2025 – eight-year-old season
Feb 22	King Abdulaziz	Saudi Cup	1	1,800 m (Standard)	14	1	--	3rd	1:51.032	1.033	Akira Sugawara	Forever Young
Apr 5	Meydan	Dubai World Cup	1	2,000 m (Standard)	11	4	14.0 (3)	6th	2:04.50	1.0	Akira Sugawara	Hit Show

Legend:
Dirt Turf

== Personality ==
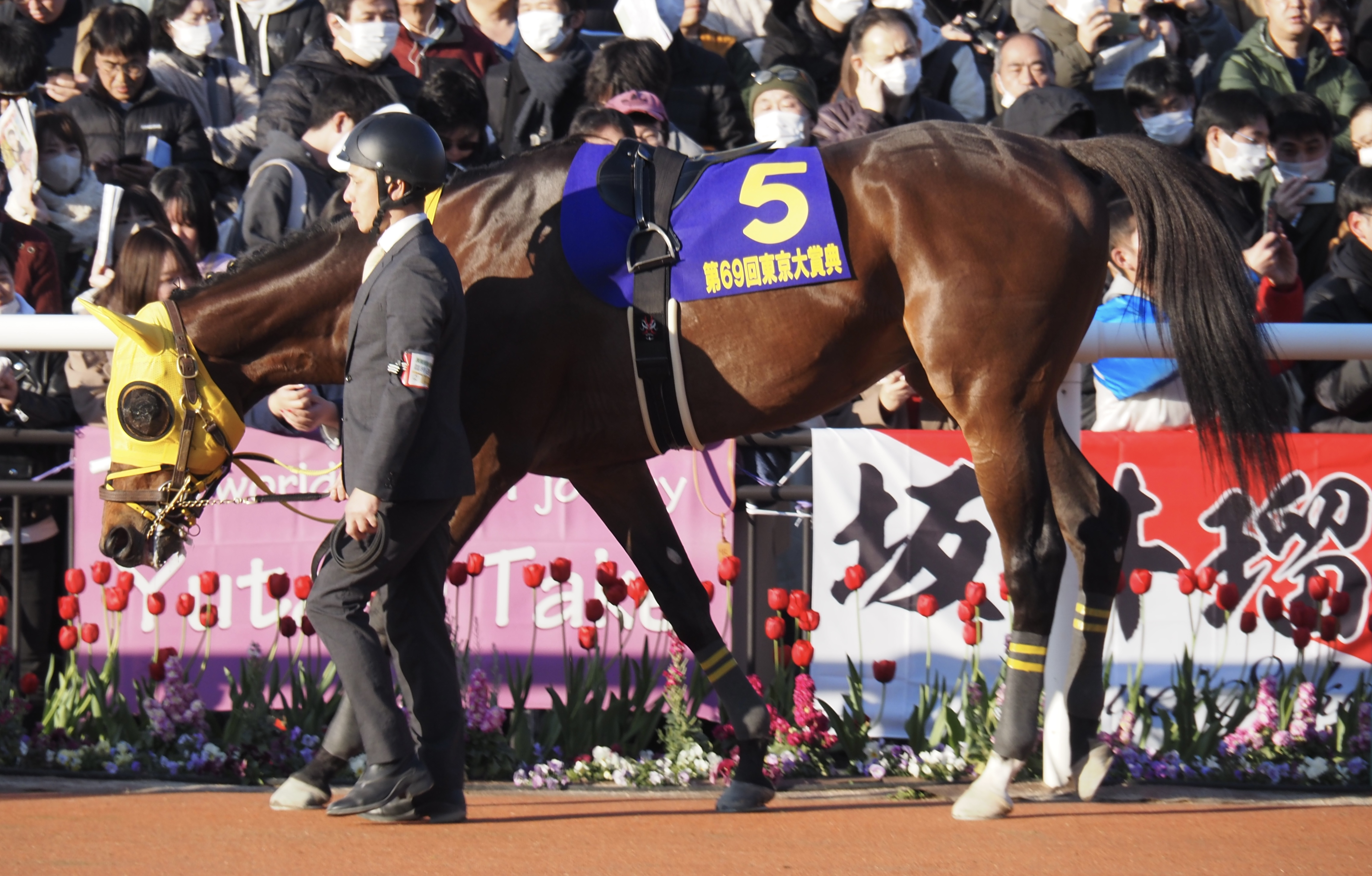
2023 Tokyo Daishoten, paddock

When training or walking around the paddock, Ushba Tesoro always looked unmotivated. Because of this, he was notoriously called by Japanese horseracing fans an "average Monday salaryman," while the overseas media called him a "lazy worker." Furthermore, his jockey from the Dubai World Cup, Yuga Kawada, mentioned, "He usually tries to return home with the other horses who have already finished galloping before he had even started galloping himself."

His trainer, Noboru Takagi, and the assistant trainer explained, "Regarding his drooping neck when walking the paddock, he is actually concentrating," and "He's fired up and ready to go."

== Pedigree ==
- "*" indicates the horse was brought to Japan from abroad.
- Ushba Tesoro was inbred 4 × 5 to Northern Taste, meaning that this stallion appears in both the fourth and fifth generations of his pedigree.

Pedigree of Ushba Tesoro
Sire Orfevre ch. 2008	Stay Gold d.b. 1994	*Sunday Silence	Halo
Sire Orfevre ch. 2008	Stay Gold d.b. 1994	*Sunday Silence	Wishing Well
Sire Orfevre ch. 2008	Stay Gold d.b. 1994	Golden Sash	*Dictus
Sire Orfevre ch. 2008	Stay Gold d.b. 1994	Golden Sash	Dyna Sash
Sire Orfevre ch. 2008	Oriental Art ch. 1997	Mejiro McQueen	Mejiro Titan
Sire Orfevre ch. 2008	Oriental Art ch. 1997	Mejiro McQueen	Mejiro Aurora
Sire Orfevre ch. 2008	Oriental Art ch. 1997	Electro Art	*Northern Taste
Sire Orfevre ch. 2008	Oriental Art ch. 1997	Electro Art	*Grandma Stevens
Dam Millefeui Attach b. 2006	King Kamehameha b. 2001	Kingmambo	Mr. Prospector
Dam Millefeui Attach b. 2006	King Kamehameha b. 2001	Kingmambo	Miesque
Dam Millefeui Attach b. 2006	King Kamehameha b. 2001	*Manfath	*Last Tycoon
Dam Millefeui Attach b. 2006	King Kamehameha b. 2001	*Manfath	Pilot Bird
Dam Millefeui Attach b. 2006	*Sixieme Sens d.b. 1992	Septieme Ciel	Seattle Slew
Dam Millefeui Attach b. 2006	*Sixieme Sens d.b. 1992	Septieme Ciel	Maximova
Dam Millefeui Attach b. 2006	*Sixieme Sens d.b. 1992	Samalex	Ela-Mana-Mou
Dam Millefeui Attach b. 2006	*Sixieme Sens d.b. 1992	Samalex	Pampas Miss
