= Nippon TV Hai =

Japanese thoroughbred race

Nippon TV Hai 日本テレビ盃
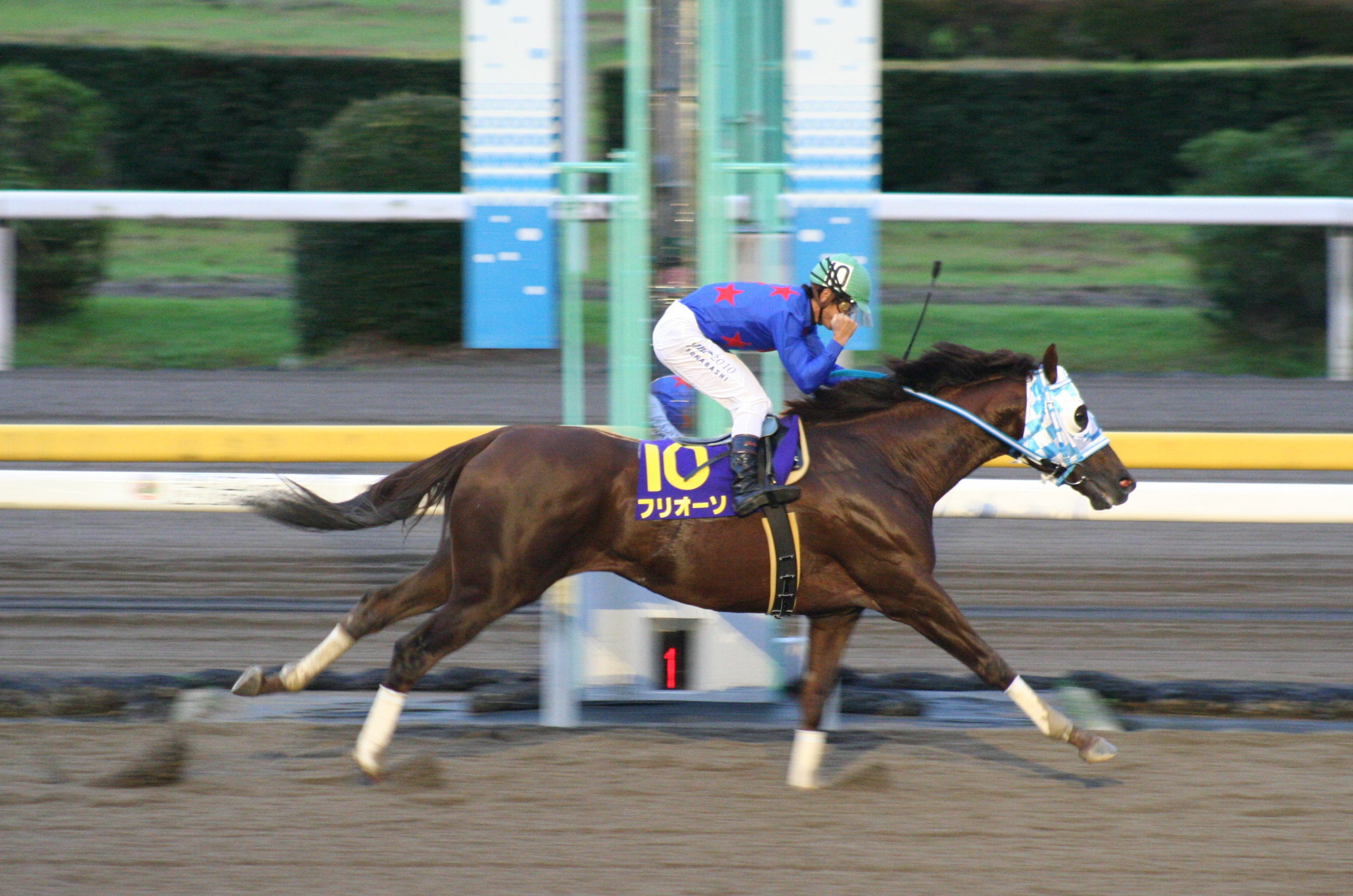
- 2010 Nippon TV Hai
- Class: Domestic Grade II (JpnII)
- Location: Funabashi Racecourse
- Inaugurated: 1954
- Race type: Thoroughbred - Flat racing

Race information
- Distance: 1,800 meters
- Surface: Dirt
- Track: Left-handed
- Qualification: Three-year-olds and up
- Weight: Special Weight
- Purse: 1st: ¥40,000,000

The Nippon TV Hai (in Japanese: 日本テレビ盃), is a Japanese horse race for three-year-olds and up at Funabashi Racecourse.

== Race details ==
The first edition of the race took place on August 4, 1954.

The race is usually held in the fall with no set month.

The race is named after the Japanese television station, Nippon TV.

== Winners since 2015 ==
Winners since 2015 include:

| Year | Winner | Jockey | Trainer | Owner | Time |
|---|---|---|---|---|---|
| 2015 | Sound True | Takuya Oono | Noboru Takagi | Hiroshi Yamada | 1:50.2 |
| 2016 | Awardee | Yutaka Take | Mikio Matsunaga | Koji Maeda | 1:52.0 |
| 2017 | Apollo Kentucky | Hiroyuki Uchida | Kenji Yamauchi | Apollo Thoroughbred Club | 1:52.9 |
| 2018 | K T Brave | Yuichi Fukunaga | Haruki Sugiyama | Kazuyoshi Takimoto | 1:52.5 |
| 2019 | Chrysoberyl | Yuga Kawada | Hidetaka Otonashi | Carrot Farm Co. Ltd. | 1:52.1 |
| 2020 | Lord Bless | Kousei Miura | Yutaka Okumura | Lord Horse Club | 1:50.5 |
| 2021 | Salsa Dione | Takayuki Yano | Chiaki Hori | Hirotaka Sugawara | 1:53.5 |
| 2022 | Field Sense | Kouta Motohashi | Takayuki Yamashita | Toshiyuki Maeda | 1:53.0 |
| 2023 | Ushba Tesoro | Yuga Kawada | Noboru Takagi | Ryotokuji Kenji Holdings | 1:51.7 |
| 2024 | William Barows | Ryusei Sakai | Hiroyuki Uemura | Koji Inokuma | 1:52.8 |
| 2025 | Forever Young | Ryusei Sakai | Yoshito Yahagi | Susumu Fujita | 1:52.2 |
| 2026 | Mikki Fight | Keita Tosaki | Hiroyasu Tanaka | Mizuki Noda | 1:52.1 |

== Past winners ==
Past winners include:

- 1954: My Moon
- 1955: Kiyo Strong
- 1956: Homare O
- 1957: Ratsky Mami
- 1958: Daini Kotobuki
- 1959: O Tajima
- 1960: Fusaryu
- 1961: Tosaboshi
- 1962: Harrow More
- 1963: Chest O
- 1964: Royal Knight
- 1965: Kotobukino Ni
- 1966: Kotobukino Ni
- 1967: Higashi Jo O
- 1968: Tsuru Hagoromo
- 1969: China Cap
- 1970: Maruyama Okan
- 1971: Owner's Taifu
- 1972: Mitsuru O
- 1973: Meiji Midori
- 1974: Askit
- 1975: Todoroki Musashi
- 1976: Fine Port
- 1977: Die Hard Kotobuki
- 1978: Edo Noboru
- 1979: Gold Lark
- 1980: Gold Spencer
- 1981: Star Reich
- 1982: Hiryu Shinzan
- 1983: Tagawa Ryu O
- 1984: Tom Count
- 1985: Brand Oscar
- 1986: Fujimi Power
- 1987: Shinano George
- 1988: Happy Chateau
- 1989: Honin Megohime
- 1990: Iioka Swallow
- 1991: Hikari Little
- 1992: King Eagle
- 1993: Hana Sale
- 1994: Allez Azuma
- 1995: K.F. Neptune
- 1996: Amazon Opera
- 1997: C.B. Daikoku
- 1998: Abukuma Poro
- 1999: Snow Endeavor
- 2000: Surprise Power
- 2001: Agnes Digital
- 2002: Makiba Sniper
- 2003: Star King Man
- 2004: Nike a Delight
- 2005: Saqalat
- 2006: Seeking the Dia
- 2007: Nike a Delight
- 2008: Bonneville Record
- 2009: Makoto Sparviero
- 2010: Furioso
- 2011: Smart Falcon
- 2012: Solitary King
- 2013: Wonder Acute
- 2014: Chrysolite

== See also ==
- Horse racing in Japan
- List of Japanese flat horse races
