= Agnes Digital =

American-bred Thoroughbred racehorse

Agnes Digital アグネスデジタル
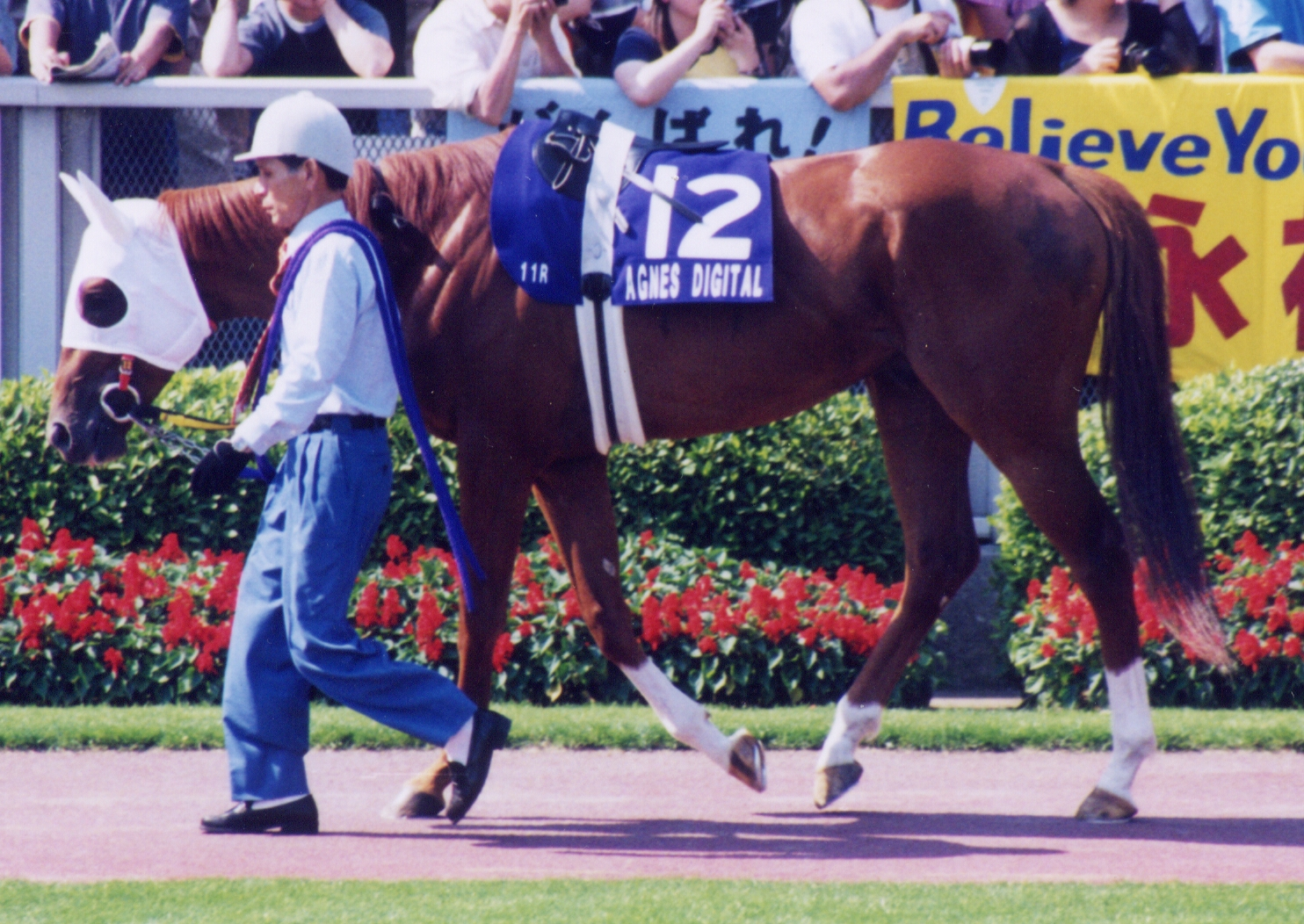
- Agnes Digital at the paddock of the 2001 Yasuda Kinen.
- Breed: Thoroughbred
- Sire: Crafty Prospector (USA)
- Grandsire: Mr. Prospector (USA)
- Dam: Chancey Squaw (USA)
- Damsire: Chief's Crown (USA)
- Sex: Stallion
- Foaled: May 15, 1997
- Died: December 8, 2021 (aged 24)
- Country: United States
- Colour: Chestnut
- Breeder: Catesby W. Clay & Peter J. Callahan
- Owner: Takao Watanabe
- Racing colours
- Trainer: Toshiaki Shirai
- Jockey: Hitoshi Matoba; Hirofumi Shii
- Record: 32:12-5-4
- Earnings: ¥948,892,700; Japan: ¥730,925,000 JPY; Hong Kong: HK$13,200,000; UAE: US$120,000

Major wins
- Zen-Nippon Sansai Yushun (1999); Unicorn Stakes (2000); Mile Championship (2000); Nippon TV Hai (2001); Mile Championship Nambu Hai (2001); Tenno Sho (Autumn) (2001); Hong Kong Cup (2001); February Stakes (2002); Yasuda Kinen (2003)

Awards
- JRA Award for Best Older Male Horse (2001)

Agnes Digital (Japanese: アグネスデジタル, Hepburn: Agunesu Dejitaru; 15 May 1997 – 8 December 2021) was an American-bred, Japanese-trained Thoroughbred racehorse and sire, and the winner of several notable Grade 1 races, including the 2001 Autumn Tenno Sho, the 2001 Hong Kong Cup, and the 2003 Yasuda Kinen.

== Background ==
Agnes Digital was a chestnut horse bred in Kentucky by Catesby W. Clay and Peter J. Callahan. He was sired by Crafty Prospector, a son of Mr. Prospector out of Chancey Squaw, a mare by Chief's Crown whose family included major bloodlines such as Blushing Groom.

He was owned by Takao Watanabe and trained by Toshiaki Shirai.

== Racing career ==
=== 1999: two-year-old season ===
Agnes Digital made his debut on September 12, 1999, in a 1,400-meter race on dirt at Hanshin Racecourse. Ridden by Yuichi Fukunaga, he went to the lead but was overtaken around the final turn and finished 2nd, seven lengths behind Machikane Ran. He won his second start in a 1,200-meter race at the same racecourse on October 2 by three lengths.

His first start on turf came on October 9 in the 1,200-meter Momiji stakes where he finished 8th, prompting his connections to return to racing him on dirt tracks. After finishing 2nd in the 1,400-meter Mochinoki Sho, he was entered in a 1,600-meter allowance race at Tokyo Racecourse, with Hitoshi Matoba replacing Fukunaga as his jockey where he won by seven lengths.

He entered in the Zen-Nippon Sansai Yushun at Kawasaki Racecourse on December 23, 1999, where he won his first graded stakes victory.

=== 2000: three-year-old season ===
Agnes Digital's first start as a three-year-old was in the Hyacinth Stakes at Tokyo Racecourse on February 20, 2000, where he finished 3rd. He was then aimed to return to racing on turf in the NHK Mile Cup, showing promise by finishing 3rd in both the 1,200-meter Crystal Cup and in the New Zealand Trophy. However, he finished 7th behind Eagle Cafe in the NHK Mile Cup.

He returned to racing on dirt in the Nagoya Yushun on June 14, 2000, where he won on record time and earning his second graded stakes victory. His next start was the Japan Dirt Derby where he was the favorite, but he finished 14th in the race.

After two months of rest, he entered the Unicorn Stakes on September 30 where he won by two and a half lengths over Machikane Ran, earning his third graded stakes victory and first in a JRA race. He then entered the Musashino Stakes where he finished second over Sandford City.

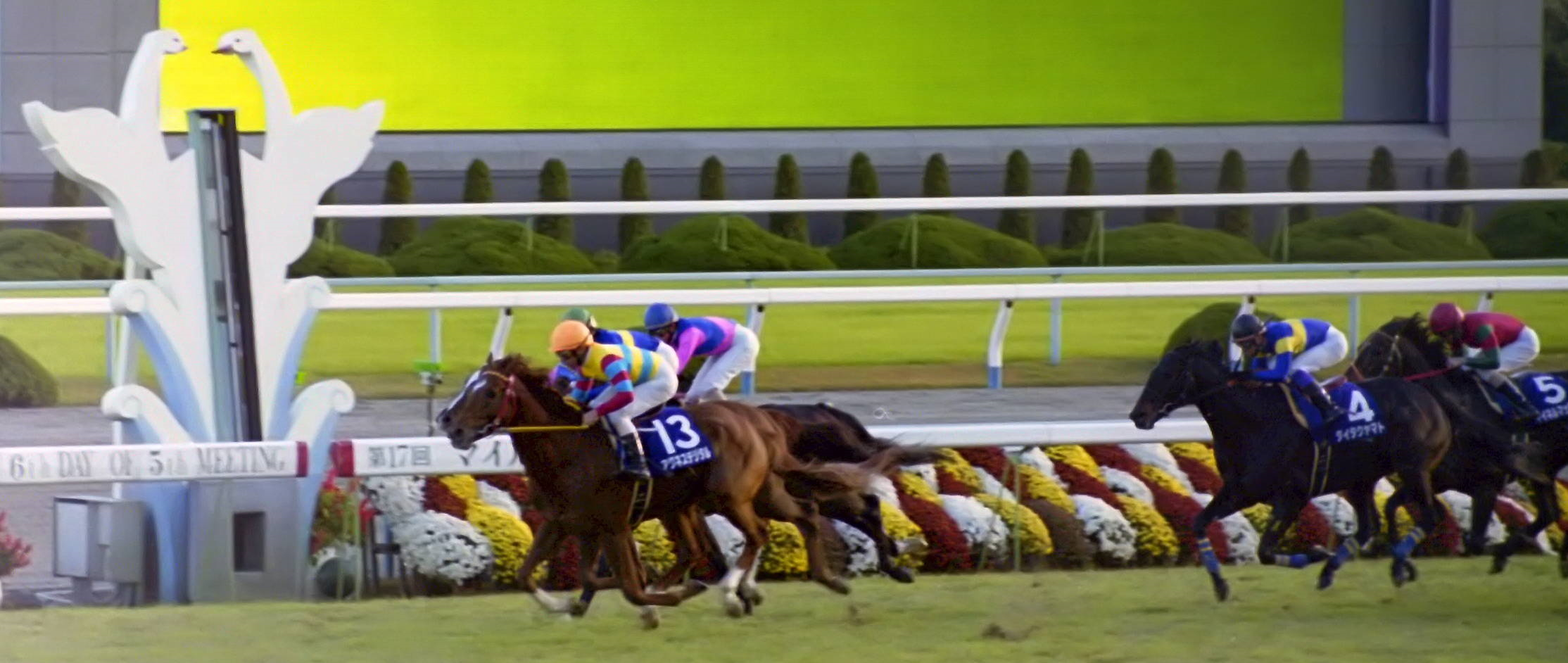
Agnes Digital in the 2000 Mile Championship.

His next start came to a choice between Japan Cup Dirt and Mile Championship. Upon Matoba's advice as he found the Japan Cup Dirt's 2,100-meter distance to be a concern while a mile on turf should be within his ability, Agnes Digital was entered in the Mile Championship. Starting the race as the 13th favorite with the odds of 55.7, he remained on the 15th place during the early pace up until the final 200 meters where he quickly overtook the field from the outside and won over Daitaku Riva by half a length, earning his first win on turf and also his first grade 1 victory while setting the record time of 1:32.6.

=== 2001: four-year-old season ===
Agnes Digital's first start as a four-year-old was the Kyoto Kimpai on January 5 where he finished 3rd behind Daitaku Riva. He developed an inflammation in his right front fetlock and had to rest, missing the February Stakes. His jockey was replaced with Hirofumi Shii after Matoba retired. He finished 9th in the Keio Hai Spring Cup and 11th in the Yasuda Kinen.

After a summer break, he returned to racing on dirt when he entered the Nippon TV Hai on September 19 and won by three lengths over Tamamo Strong. He then entered the Mile Championship Nambu Hai where he raced against the previous year's leading dirt horse Wing Arrow and the February Stakes winner Nobo True. Starting as the favorite, he won the race over Toho Emperor.

His next start was the Autumn Tenno Sho, a decision which became controversial. Initially, Agnes Digital was to defend his Mile Championship title but was entered in the Autumn Tenno Sho instead after having enough earnings to qualify and the race allowing up to two foreign-bred horses since the previous year. This pushed Kurofune out of the race, prompting criticism from fans who assumed the horse had little chance against TM Opera O, Meisho Doto and Stay Gold. Starting as the 4th favorite with the odds of 20.0, Agnes Digital initially remained on the 10th place while the field fought on a slow pace due to the heavy ground. As TM Opera O overtook Meisho Doto in the homestretch, Agnes Digital quickly overtook from the outside, winning by a length over TM Opera O and becoming the first foreign-bred horse to win the race since Midfarm in 1956 after foreign-bred horses were eligible to enter the race again.

Agnes Digital was sent to Hong Kong to contest the Hong Kong Cup on December 16. In the race, he exited from post position 12 where he initially went to the front before settling behind Tobougg who lead the field. In the final straight, he moved to 2nd and took the lead. Despite a desperate attempt from Tobougg to close the distance, Agnes Digital won the race by a head, earning his first overseas Grade 1 victory.

He was selected as the Best Older Male Horse for 2001.

=== 2002: five-year-old season ===
Agnes Digital's first race as a five-year-old was the February Stakes which served as his preparation for the Dubai World Cup. He entered the race as a favorite and won behind Toshin Blizzard, achieving five straight Grade 1 wins on different surfaces. He was then sent to Dubai to contest the Dubai World Cup. However, preparation went badly as aircraft trouble led him to get stranded in Hong Kong and heavy rain after reaching Dubai further disrupted his training. In the race, he finished 6th, about 16 lengths behind Street Cry. He returned to Hong Kong to contest the Queen Elizabeth II Cup where he finished 2nd behind fellow Japanese-trained Eishin Preston by half a length. After showing signs of fatigue, Agnes Digital was given a long rest. He did not race again for the rest of the year.

=== 2003: six-year-old season ===
After nearly a year off, he entered the Kakitsubata Kinen where he finished 4th. His next start was the Yasuda Kinen where he won by a neck over Admire Max. His winning time was 1:32.1, breaking the record previously set by Oguri Cap in 1990. He was then entered in the Takarazuka Kinen where he finished 13th behind Hishi Miracle.

His next start following his summer break was the Nippon TV Hai where he finished 2nd. He then tried to reclaim both the Mile Championship Nambu Hai where he finished 5th and the Autumn Tenno where he finished 17th. His last race was the Arima Kinen on December 28 where he finished 9th behind Symboli Kris S.

A retirement ceremony for Agnes Digital was held at Kyoto Racecourse in January 2004.

== Features and Evaluation ==
Agnes Digital has raced at 11 racecourses in Japan and overseas, winning three consecutive GI races on both turf and dirt tracks at the central, regional, and Hong Kong levels. He has been praised as an "all-rounder" and "a truly versatile horse." Writer Tamaki Abe commented, "There is no horse in the history of Japanese horse racing that has demonstrated such strength in a variety of categories. Perhaps the only example that comes to mind is Takeshibao of the 1960s, who won races on dirt tracks and in the Emperor's Cup at distances ranging from 1,200 meters to 3,200 meters." Meanwhile, Takuya Yamakawa said of Takeshibao, "In an era when baseball was the only popular sport, a boy with exceptional athletic ability was entrusted with the role of fourth batter in baseball and ace striker in soccer." He went on to call Agnes Digital, who lived in an era when there were specialists in each track, a "true super-all-rounder" and an "extraordinary super horse."

Toshiaki Shirai commented that "a horse like this rarely appears," and Hirofumi Yoi recalled that when he won the Yasuda Kinen after being thought to have burned out, "it defied common sense, I thought he was truly a wonder horse". His stable hand, Tamio Inoue, was also amazed at the time, saying, "I don't know what this horse is like." While mental strength is cited as the secret to his success in races around the country, his personality was very quiet, and Yoi described him as "seemingly sleepy" and "seemingly motivated."

In 2010, the Japan Racing Association's newsletter Yushun held a special selection of famous horses to commemorate its 800th issue, titled "Immortal Famous Horses to Pass on to the Future," in which he was ranked 38th by readers' vote. In a similar selection held at the end of 2014, he was ranked 44th.

As of 2020, there are five racehorses, including Agnes Digital, that have won both turf and dirt GI races in the JRA. All of them were recorded in the order of winning a GI race on turf before winning a GI race on dirt. However, Agnes Digital is the only racehorse to have won a GI race on dirt and then re-win a GI race on turf.

== Racing form ==
Agnes Digital won 12 races and reached podium nine times out of 32 starts. This data is available in JBIS, netkeiba, HKJC and racingpost.

Date	Track	Race	Grade	Distance (Condition)	Entry	HN	Odds (Favored)	Finish	Time	Margins	Jockey	Winner (Runner-up)
1999 – two-year-old season
Sep 12	Hanshin	2yo Newcomer		1,400 m (Fast)	7	4	2.2 (2)	2nd	1:26.6	1.1	Yuichi Fukunaga	Machikane Ran
Oct 2	Hanshin	2yo Newcomer		1,200 m (Fast)	7	7	1.2 (1)	1st	1:13.0	–0.5	Yuichi Fukunaga	(Tsurumaru Arashi)
Oct 9	Kyoto	Momiji Stakes	OP	1,200 m (Firm)	10	10	9.1 (7)	8th	1:09.7	1.2	Yuichi Fukunaga	End Appeal
Nov 7	Kyoto	Mochinoki Sho	ALW (1W)	1,400 m (Fast)	16	9	4.7 (1)	2nd	1:25.1	0.0	Yuichi Fukunaga	Three for Niner
Nov 27	Tokyo	2yo Allowance	1W	1,600 m (Fast)	13	1	1.8 (1)	1st	1:38.2	–1.2	Hitoshi Matoba	(Fine Eleven)
Dec 23	Kawasaki	Zen-Nippon Sansai Yushun (Note: Some competition name were using old-age notation)	JPN II (Note: All JPN graded races are graded as "Listed" internationally)	1,600 m (Fast)	12	3	0.0 (1)	1st	1:41.1	–0.5	Hitoshi Matoba	(Tsurumi Kaiun)
2000 – three-year-old season
Feb 20	Tokyo	Hyacinth Stakes	OP	1,600 m (Fast)	12	11	3.5 (3)	3rd	1:37.8	1.4	Hitoshi Matoba	Nobo Jack
Mar 12	Nakayama	Crystal Cup	III	1,200 m (Firm)	16	4	26.2 (8)	3rd	1:10.3	0.5	Hitoshi Matoba	Sweet Orchid
Apr 8	Nakayama	New Zealand Trophy	II	1,600 m (Firm)	15	15	23.4 (7)	3rd	1:34.5	0.1	Hitoshi Matoba	Eishin Preston
May 7	Tokyo	NHK Mile Cup	I	1,600 m (Firm)	18	4	8.0 (4)	7th	1:34.3	0.8	Hitoshi Matoba	Eagle Cafe
Jun 14	Nagoya	Nagoya Yushun	JPN II	1,900 m (Sloppy)	12	8	0.0 (3)	1st	R1:59.8 (Note: R indicated that it was a record time finish)	–0.3	Hitoshi Matoba	(Meiner Combat)
Jul 12	Ohi	Japan Dirt Derby	JPN I	2,000 m (Fast)	16	7	0.0 (1)	14th	2:09.3	2.9	Hitoshi Matoba	Meiner Combat
Sep 30	Nakayama	Unicorn Stakes	III	1,800 m (Fast)	16	1	10.0 (4)	1st	1:50.7	–0.4	Hitoshi Matoba	(Machikane Ran)
Oct 28	Tokyo	Musashino Stakes	III	1,600 m (Fast)	16	11	8.3 (4)	2nd	1:35.6	0.2	Hitoshi Matoba	Sanford City
Nov 19	Kyoto	Mile Championship	I	1,600 m (Firm)	18	13	55.7 (13)	1st	R1:32.6	–0.1	Hitoshi Matoba	(Daitaku Riva)
2001 – four-year-old season
Jan 5	Kyoto	Kyoto Kimpai	III	1,600 m (Firm)	16	9	4.8 (3)	3rd	1:33.8	0.4	Hitoshi Matoba	Daitaku Riva
May 13	Tokyo	Keio Hai Spring Cup	II	1,400 m (Firm)	18	15	8.6 (4)	9th	1:20.7	0.6	Hirofumi Shii	Stinger
Jun 3	Tokyo	Yasuda Kinen	I	1,600 m (Firm)	18	12	17.7 (6)	11th	1:34.1	1.1	Hirofumi Shii	Black Hawk
Sep 19	Funabashi	Nippon TV Hai	JPN III	1,800 m (Fast)	8	7	0.0 (3)	1st	1:51.2	–0.7	Hirofumi Shii	(Tamamo Strong)
Oct 8	Morioka	Mile Championship Nambu Hai	JPN I	1,600 m (Fast)	9	7	0.0 (1)	1st	1:37.7	–0.1	Hirofumi Shii	(Toho Emperor)
Oct 28	Tokyo	Tennō Shō (Autumn)	I	2,000 m (Soft)	13	10	20.0 (4)	1st	2:02.0	–0.2	Hirofumi Shii	(T M Opera O)
Dec 16	Sha Tin	Hong Kong Cup	I	2,000 m (Firm)	14	1	3.9 (2)	1st	2:02.8	–0.1	Hirofumi Shii	(Tobougg)
2002 – five-year-old season
Feb 17	Tokyo	February Stakes	I	1,600 m (Fast)	16	9	3.5 (1)	1st	1:35.1	–0.2	Hirofumi Shii	(Toshin Blizzard)
Mar 23	Nad Al Sheba	Dubai World Cup	I	2,000 m (Fast)	11	1	5/1 (3)	6th	2:03.8	2.6	Hirofumi Shii	Street Cry
Apr 21	Sha Tin	Queen Elizabeth II Cup	I	2,000 m (Firm)	14	1	5.9 (3)	2nd	2:02.6	0.1	Hirofumi Shii	Eishin Preston
2003 – six-year-old season
May 1	Nagoya	Kakitsubata Kinen	JPN III	1,400 m (Fast)	12	3	0.0 (4)	4th	1:25.9	0.4	Hirofumi Shii	Biwa Shinseiki
Jun 8	Tokyo	Yasuda Kinen	I	1,600 m (Firm)	18	3	9.4 (4)	1st	R1:32.1	0.0	Hirofumi Shii	(Admire Max)
Jun 29	Hanshin	Takarazuka Kinen	I	2,200 m (Firm)	17	2	6.8 (3)	13th	2:13.7	1.7	Hirofumi Shii	Hishi Miracle
Sep 15	Funabashi	Nippon TV Hai	JPN II	1,800 m (Firm)	14	3	0.0 (1)	2nd	1:52.2	0.8	Hirofumi Shii	Star King Men
Oct 13	Morioka	Mile Championship Nambu Hai	JPN I	1,800 m (Muddy)	14	7	0.0 (2)	5th	1:37.0	1.6	Hirofumi Shii	Admire Don
Nov 2	Tokyo	Tennō Shō (Autumn)	I	2,000 m (Firm)	18	11	7.9 (4)	17th	2:00.4	2.4	Hirofumi Shii	Symboli Kris S
Dec 28	Nakayama	Arima Kinen	I	2,500 m (Firm)	12	11	17.4 (7)	9th	2:32.8	2.3	Hirofumi Shii	Symboli Kris S

Legend:
Dirt Turf

== Stud career and death ==
Agnes Digital stood as a breeding stallion at Big Red Farm in Niikappu, Hokkaido. His first foals, Aim at VIP, Dream Signal, and Yamanin Kingly, debuted in 2007, placing him second in the new sire rankings behind Symboli Kris S. The following January 2008, Dream Signal won the Shinzan Kinen, marking the first victory for a foal in a Graded race. In 2014, Kazenoko won the Japan Dirt Derby, marking the first victory for a foal in a Grade 1 race (JpnI). Like himself, he has also produced foals capable of both turf and dirt such as Yamanin Kingly who won the Grade 2 Sapporo Kinen and Grade 3 Chunichi Shimbun Hai on turf whilst also grabbed the Grade 3 Sirius Stakes on dirt.

He retired from stud duties in 2020 and spent the rest of his life at the Tokachi Light Horse Agricultural Cooperative Association Stud Farm. He was euthanized on December 8, 2021, following an accident while out grazing.

Agnes Digital's descendants include:

c = colt, f = filly

Foaled	Name	Sex	Major Wins
2005	Dream Signal	c	Shinzan Kinen
2005	Ubiquitous	c	Unicorn Stakes
2005	Daishin Orange	c	Antares Stakes, Heian Stakes
2005	Yamanin Kingly	c	Chunichi Shimbun Hai, Sapporo Kinen, Sirius Stakes
2006	Grand Prix Angel	f	Hakodate Sprint Stakes
2007	Sound Barrier	f	Fillies' Revue
2009	Meisho Suzanna	f	Queen Stakes
2011	Asukano Roman	c	Tokai Stakes, Heian Stakes
2011	Kazenoko	c	Japan Dirt Derby

== In popular culture ==
An anthropomorphized version of Agnes Digital appears as a character in the Japanese multimedia franchise Umamusume: Pretty Derby, voiced by Minori Suzuki. She is depicted as a perverted and eccentric otaku who is nonetheless an accomplished racer herself, having trained to be adept on both turf and dirt in order to get close to other Umamusume. Both her parents are similarly eccentric and passionate as her, with Digital especially taking after her father who runs a print shop (likely a reference to Takao Watanabe owning a printing business). Despite her strange and over-enthusiastic behavior towards her peers, she is highly respectful and supportive of them, yet believes herself to be merely a fan of other racers and struggles with the idea of becoming popular herself or having her own fandom.

== Pedigree ==
Pedigree of Agnes Digital (USA), chestnut colt, 1997
Sire Crafty Prospector (USA) 1979	Mr. Prospector (USA); 1970	Raise a Native	Native Dancer
Sire Crafty Prospector (USA) 1979	Mr. Prospector (USA); 1970	Raise a Native	Raise You
Sire Crafty Prospector (USA) 1979	Mr. Prospector (USA); 1970	Gold Digger	Nashua
Sire Crafty Prospector (USA) 1979	Mr. Prospector (USA); 1970	Gold Digger	Sequence
Sire Crafty Prospector (USA) 1979	Real Crafty Lady (USA); 1975	In Reality	Intentionally
Sire Crafty Prospector (USA) 1979	Real Crafty Lady (USA); 1975	In Reality	My Dear Girl
Sire Crafty Prospector (USA) 1979	Real Crafty Lady (USA); 1975	Princess Roycraft	Royal Note
Sire Crafty Prospector (USA) 1979	Real Crafty Lady (USA); 1975	Princess Roycraft	Crafty Princess
Dam Chancey Squaw (USA) 1991	Chief's Crown (USA); 1982	Danzig	Northern Dancer
Dam Chancey Squaw (USA) 1991	Chief's Crown (USA); 1982	Danzig	Pas De Nom
Dam Chancey Squaw (USA) 1991	Chief's Crown (USA); 1982	Six Crowns	Secretariat
Dam Chancey Squaw (USA) 1991	Chief's Crown (USA); 1982	Six Crowns	Chris Evert
Dam Chancey Squaw (USA) 1991	Allicance (USA); 1980	Alleged	Hoist The Flag
Dam Chancey Squaw (USA) 1991	Allicance (USA); 1980	Alleged	Princess Pout
Dam Chancey Squaw (USA) 1991	Allicance (USA); 1980	Runaway Bride	Wild Risk
Dam Chancey Squaw (USA) 1991	Allicance (USA); 1980	Runaway Bride	Aimee
