= Tokyo Daishōten =

Grade I dirt horse race in Japan

- 2023 Tokyo Daishōten winner, Ushba Tesoro
- Class: GI
- Location: Ōi Racecourse, Shinagawa, Tokyo
- Inaugurated: October 16, 1955
- Race type: Thoroughbred Flat racing

Race information
- Distance: 2,000 meters (About 10 furlongs)
- Surface: Dirt
- Track: Right-handed
- Qualification: 3-y-o & Up
- Weight: 57kg, 3-y-o allowed 2kg, females allowed 2kg
- Purse: 170,000,000 JPY(as of 2025); 1st: 100,000,000 JPY

The Tokyo Daishōten (東京大賞典) is a Japanese horse race on dirt track for thoroughbreds three years old and above. It is run over a distance of 2,000 meters (about 10 furlongs) at Ōi Racecourse in Shinagawa, Tokyo in December.

== History ==
The race was first held in 1955. At first it was named Aki-no-Kura (秋の鞍), meaning 'The Race of Autumn race meeting', and raced over a distance of 2,600 meters. Along with the Spring Kura (later the Tokyo Derby), the Spring Special (later the Arab Derby), and the Autumn Special (later the All-Japan Arab Grand Prix), it was positioned as one of the four major races at Oi Racecourse. The first race was run over 2600 meters on dirt, with a first-place prize of 1 million yen.

In 1966, its name was changed to the Tokyo Daishōten.

Since 2011, It has been held as an international Grade 1 race, and is the only international race in Japan not organized by the Japan Racing Association. As of 2011 regulations, foreign-trained horses that preregister for the Japan Cup Dirt (now the Champions Cup) are automatically preregistered for the Tokyo Daishoten as well, with transportation costs and travel expenses for returning home the responsibility of the foreign horse's connections. However, if a horse participates in both the Champions Cup and Tokyo Daishōten consecutively, the Special Ward Horse Racing Association covers transportation and travel expenses.

The race provides an alternative to the February Stakes and to the Dubai World Cup Night's meetings for Japanese horses.

Its distance has been changed three times. From 1962 to 1988, it was 3,000 meters long. From 1989 to 1997, it was 2,800 meters. In 1998, the race had been changed to its present distance of 2,000 meters.

Gold Allure, Vermilion, Kane Hekili, Hokko Tarumae, and Copano Rickey have all won the race on the way to winning the JRA Award for Best Dirt Horse.

== Records ==
Speed record (since 1998 distance change)

- 2:00.4 – Smart Falcon (2010)

Most successful horse (4 wins):

- Omega Perfume – 2018, 2019, 2020, 2021 - the first in Japan to win the same international Grade I race fourth times in a row.

Other multiple winners (2 wins):

- Adjudi Mitsuo – 2004, 2005
- Smart Falcon – 2010, 2011
- Hokko Tarumae – 2013, 2014
- Ushba Tesoro – 2022, 2023

== Winners since 1990 ==
Year	Winner	Age	Jockey	Trainer	Owner	Organization	Time
1990	Daiko Galdan	5	Shuji Hayata	Takashi Takaiwa	Nobushige Kumakubo	Ohi	3:02.2
1991	Bold Faith	3	Chiaki Hori	Sadaji Iino	Yoichi Masuda	Ohi	2:59.1
1992	Dollar Okan	5	Chiaki Hori	Kiyomatsu Akama	Mitsuaki Fuse	Ohi	3:02.3
1993	White Silver	3	Katsunori Arayama	Tokuichi Arayama	Goro Wakasa	Ohi	3:00.4
1994	Dolphin Boy	3	Hiromi Yamazaki	Kunihiro Sasaki	Seiichi Serizawa	Kawasaki	3:00.6
1995	Admire Bosatsu	5	Junichi Serizawa	Mitsuru Hashida	Riichi Kondo	JRA	3:01.7
1996	Kyoto City	5	Mikio Matsunaga	Kentaro Nakao	Yushun Horse Club Co.	JRA	3:01.2
1997	Toyo Seattle	4	Masahiro Matsunaga	Yoshiharu Matsunaga	Toyo Club Co.	JRA	3:00.4
1998	Abukuma Poro	6	Takayuki Ishizaki	Katsumi Degawa	Akinori Yarimizu	JRA	2:05.4
1999	World Cleek	4	Kazuhiro Kato	Hitoshi Arai	International Horse Co.	JRA	2:04.9
2000	Fast Friend	6	Masayoshi Ebina	Keiji Takaichi	Hiroaki Takezaki	JRA	2:04.9
2001	Toho Emperor	5	Isao Sugawara	Yotsumi Chiba	Toho Bussan Co.	Mizusawa	2:05.2
2002	Gold Allure	3	Yutaka Take	Yasuo Ikee	Shadai Racehorse Co.	JRA	2:05.6
2003	Star King Man	4	Yutaka Take	Hideyuki Mori	Gold Racing Co.	JRA	2:03.7
2004	Adjudi Mitsuo	3	Hiroyuki Uchida	Masayuki Kawashima	Masao Orido	Funabashi	2:02.6
2005	Adjudi Mitsuo	4	Hiroyuki Uchida	Masayuki Kawashima	Masao Orido	Funabashi	2:03.1
2006	Blue Concorde	6	Hideaki Miyuki	Toshiyuki Hattori	Ogifushi Racing Club Co.	JRA	2:03.5
2007	Vermilion	5	Yutaka Take	Sei Ishizaka	Sunday Racing Co.	JRA	2:03.2
2008	Kane Hekili	6	Christophe Lemaire	Katsuhiko Sumii	Makoto Kaneko	JRA	2:04.5
2009	Success Brocken	4	Hiroyuki Uchida	Hideaki Fujiwara	Tetsu Takashima	JRA	2:05.9
2010	Smart Falcon	5	Yutaka Take	Ken Kozaki	Toru Okawa	JRA	2:00.4
2011	Smart Falcon	6	Yutaka Take	Ken Kozaki	Toru Okawa	JRA	2:01.8
2012	Roman Legend	4	Yasunari Iwata	Hideaki Fujiwara	Yosimi Ota	JRA	2:05.9
2013	Hokko Tarumae	4	Hideaki Miyuki	Katsuichi Nishiura	Koichi Yabe	JRA	2:06.6
2014	Hokko Tarumae	5	Hideaki Miyuki	Katsuichi Nishiura	Michiaki Yabe	JRA	2:03.0
2015	Sound True	5	Takuya Ono	Noboru Takagi	Hiroshi Yamada	JRA	2:03.0
2016	Apollo Kentucky	4	Hiroyuki Uchida	Kenji Yamauchi	Apollo Thoroughbred Club	JRA	2:05:8
2017	Copano Rickey	7	Hironobu Tanabe	Akira Murayama	Sachiaki Kobayashi	JRA	2:04.2
2018	Omega Perfume	3	Mirco Demuro	Shogo Yasuda	Reiko Hara	JRA	2:05.9
2019	Omega Perfume	4	Mirco Demuro	Shogo Yasuda	Reiko Hara	JRA	2:04.9
2020	Omega Perfume	5	Mirco Demuro	Shogo Yasuda	Reiko Hara	JRA	2:06.9
2021	Omega Perfume	6	Mirco Demuro	Shogo Yasuda	Reiko Hara	JRA	2:04.1
2022	Ushba Tesoro	5	Kazuo Yokoyama	Noboru Takagi	Ryotokuji Kenji Holdings Co Ltd	JRA	2:05.0
2023	Ushba Tesoro	6	Yuga Kawada	Noboru Takagi	Ryotokuji Kenji Holdings Co Ltd	JRA	2:07.3
2024	Forever Young	3	Ryusei Sakai	Yoshito Yahagi	Susumu Fujita	JRA	2:04.9
2025	Diktaean	7	Yano Takayuki	Katsunori Arayama	G1 Racing Co Ltd	Ohi	2:04.3

Tokyo Daishōten winners

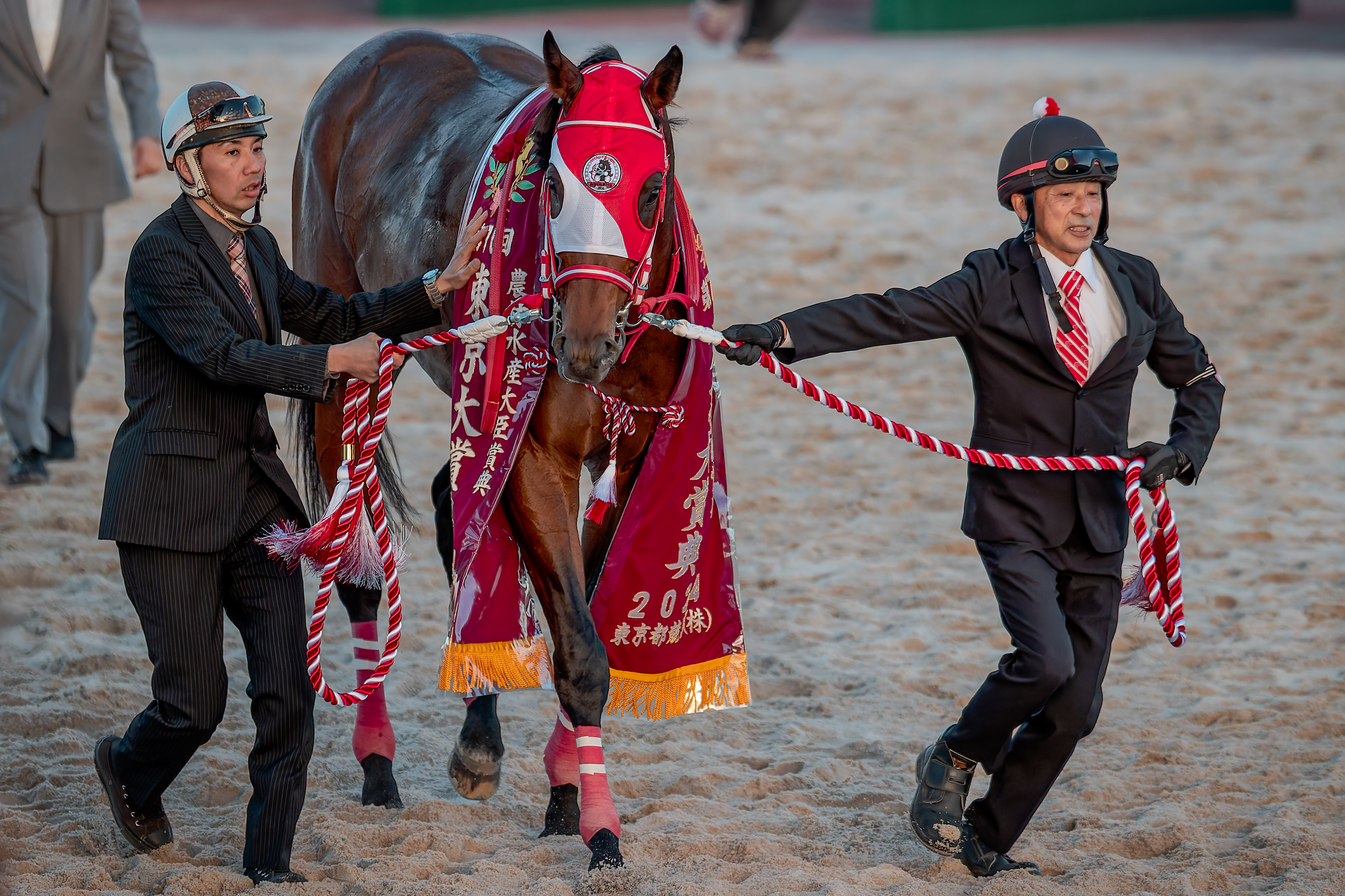
Forever Young after winning the 2024 Tokyo Daishōten. Forever Young would go on to be the first dirt racehorse to win the Japanese Horse of the Year Award. Forever Young was also the first Japanese racehorse to win the Breeders' Cup Classic, and came third in the Kentucky Derby after a photo finish between him, Mystik Dan and Sierra Leone.

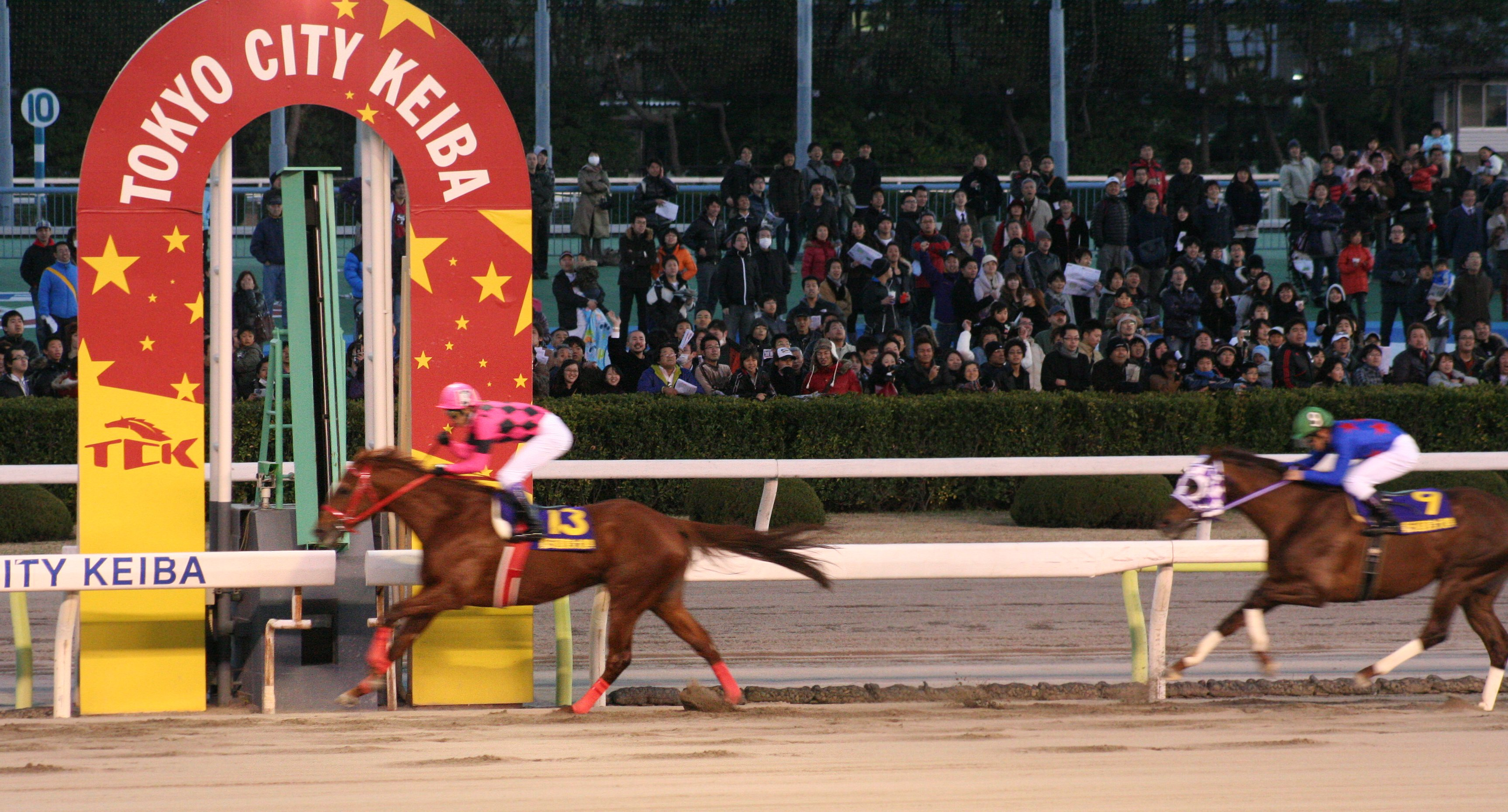
Smart Falcon winning the 2010 Tokyo Daishōten. Smart Falcon won the NAR Grand Prix Dirt Grade Race Special Award for two years in a row (2010 and 2011). Smart Falcon would also go on to win the 2011 Tokyo Daishōten and other prestigious dirt races in Japan such as the JBC Classic and Teio Sho.

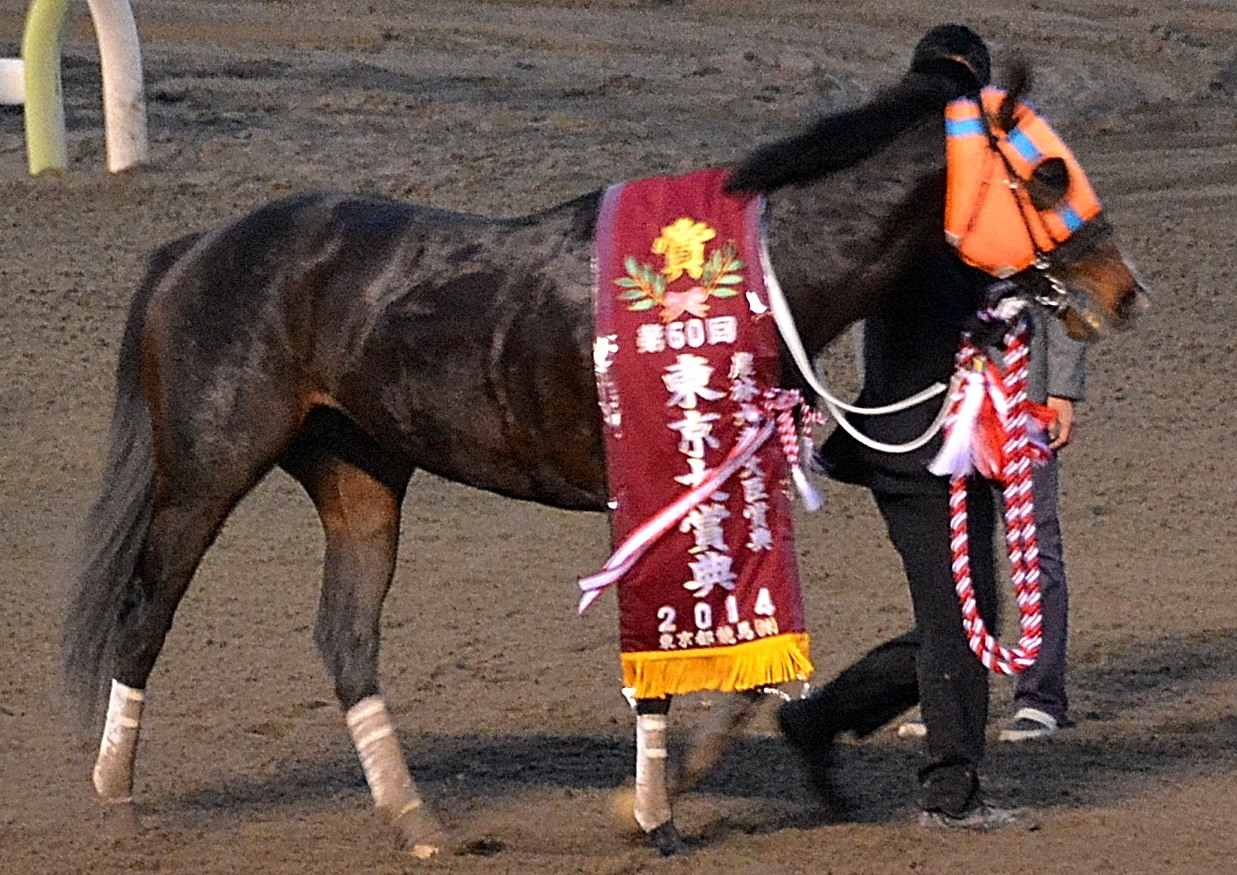
Hokko Tarumae after winning the 2014 Tokyo Daishōten. Hokko Tarumae was awarded the JRA Award for Best Dirt Horse in 2014, and the NAR Grand Prix Dirt Grade Race Special Prize in 2013, 2014 and 2015. Hokko Tarumae also won the 2013 Tokyo Daishōten.

== Previous Winners ==
- 1955 - Miss Asahiro
- 1956 - Kenchikara
- 1957 - Ichikanto (Seizan)
- 1958 - Daiko Tobuki
- 1959 - Dancer
- 1960 - Onslaught
- 1961 - Saki Midori
- 1962 - Daisan Kotobuki
- 1963 - Shinnitsukei
- 1964 - Orion Horse
- 1965 - Oshachi
- 1966 - Gokaioh
- 1967 - Higashijio
- 1968 - Ashiyafuji
- 1969 - Yashima National
- 1970 - Daini Health O
- 1971 - Fuji Prince
- 1972 - Friyufast
- 1973 - Hidemusashi
- 1974 - Todoroki Mushi
- 1975 - Speed Persia
- 1976 - Fairport
- 1977 - Todoroki Hiryu
- 1978 - Hatsushiba O
- 1979 - Ebi Chikara
- 1980 - Tokei Hope
- 1981 - Azuma King
- 1982 - Trust Hawk
- 1983 - San-Oi
- 1984 - Tetsuno Kachidoki
- 1985 - Suzuyu
- 1986 - Countess Up
- 1987 - Tetsuno Kachidoki
- 1988 - Inari One
- 1989 - Rosita

== See also ==
- Horse racing in Japan
- List of Japanese flat horse races
