= Zen-Nippon Nisai Yushun =

Japanese thoroughbred race

Zen-Nippon Nisai Yushun 全日本2歳優駿
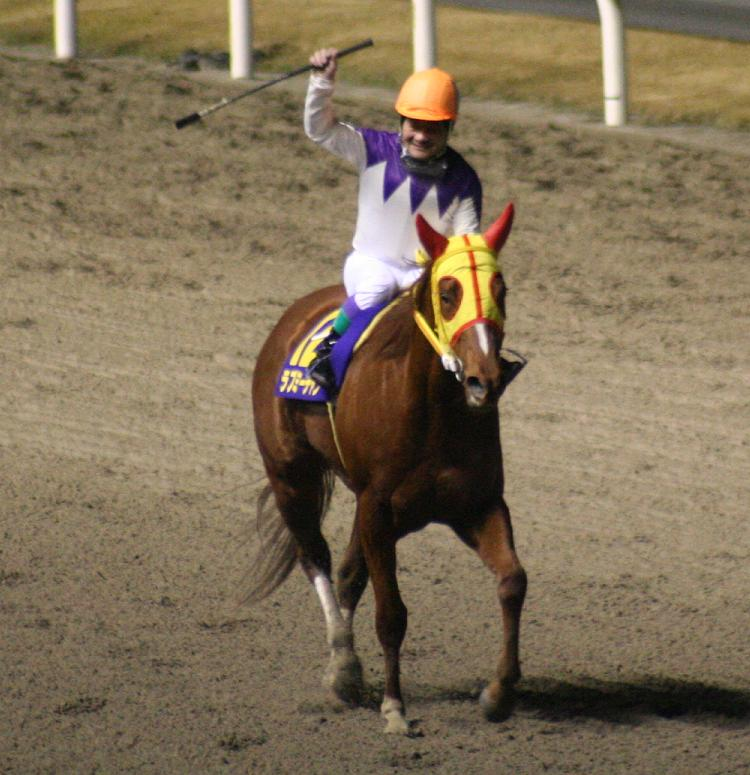
- 2009 Zen-Nippon Nisai Yushun
- Class: Domestic Grade 1 (JpnI); International Listed
- Location: Kawasaki Racecourse; Kawasaki, Kanagawa
- Inaugurated: 13 August 1950 (76 years ago)
- Race type: Thoroughbred - Flat racing

Race information
- Distance: 1,600 meters (about 8 furlongs or a mile)
- Surface: Dirt
- Track: Left-handed
- Qualification: Two-years-old
- Weight: 56 kg Allowances; 1 kg for fillies 3 kg for S. Hemisphere
- Purse: ¥ 71,400,000 (as of 2025); 1st: ¥ 42,000,000; 2nd: ¥ 14,700,000; 3rd: ¥ 8,400,000

The Zen-Nippon Nisai Yushun (全日本2歳優駿) is an internationally listed, Domestic Grade 1 flat horse race in Japan open for two-year-old Thoroughbreds. It is run at Kawasaki Racecourse over a distance of 1600 metres.

The race was first run in 1950 and is an important race in Japan for two-year-olds on dirt. In 2017, the race began to be included as part of the Road to the Kentucky Derby series.

== Trial races ==
Trial races provide automatic berths to the winners that belongs to National Association of Racing.

Race Name	Class	Racecourse	Distance	Condition
Kamakura Kinen	SII	Kawasaki	1,600 meters	Winner
Heiwa Sho	SIII	Funabashi	1,600 meters	Winner
Haiseiko Kinen	SI	Ohi	1,600 meters	Winner
JBC Nisai Yushun	JpnIII	Monbetsu	1,800 meters	Winner
Hyogo Junior Grand Prix	JpnII	Sonoda	1,400 meters	Winner

In addition to the above, horses that finish in the top two in dirt graded races are eligible to be selected as designated horses.

== Winners since 1997 ==
Year	Winner	Jockey	Trainer	Owner	Time
1997	Agnes World (USA)	Yutaka Take (JPN)	(Japan) Hideyuki Mori (JRA)	Takao Watanabe (JPN); Teruya Yoshida (JPN)	1:41.7
1998	Admire Mambo (JPN)	Katsuharu Tanaka (JPN)	(Japan) Mitsuru Hashida (JRA)	Riichi Kondo (JPN)	1:43.3
1999	Agnes Digital (USA)	Hitoshi Matoba (JPN)	(Japan) Toshiaki Shirai (JRA)	Takao Watanabe (JPN)	1:41.1
2000	Toshin Blizzard (JPN)	Takayuki Ishizaki (JPN)	(Japan) Kenji Sato (FUN)	Hironobu Inagaki (JPN)	1:42.6
2001	Principal River (JPN)	Fuyuki Igarashi (JPN)	(Japan) Haruo Narita (HOK)	Teruya Yoshida (JPN)	1:42.5
2002	Utopia (JPN)	Hiroshi Kawachi (JPN)	(Japan) Kojiro Hashiguchi (JRA)	Kaneko Makoto Holdings (JPN)	1:42.4
2003	Admire Hope (JPN)	Yutaka Take (JPN)	(Japan) Mitsuru Hashida (JRA)	Riichi Kondo (JPN)	1:42.8
2004	Pride Kim (JPN)	Kenichi Ikezoe (JPN)	(Japan) Kaneo Ikezoe (JRA)	Tomiro Fukami (JPN)	1:40.6
2005	Grace Tiara (JPN)	Katsuharu Tanaka (JPN)	(Japan) Takahisa Tezuka (JRA)	Shimokobe Farm Co., Ltd. (JPN)	1:42.3
2006	Furioso (JPN)	Hiroyuki Uchida (JPN)	(Japan) Masayuki Kawashima (FUN)	Darley Japan Racing (JPN)	1:41.8
2007	Iide Kenshin (JPN)	Shinji Fujita (JPN)	(Japan) Mitsugu Kon (JRA)	RSA Country Co., Ltd. (JPN)	1:41.8
2008	Suni (USA)	Hiroyuki Uchida (JPN)	(Japan) Naohiro Yoshida (JRA)	Kazumi Yoshida (JPN)	1:40.5
2009	Love Michan (JPN)	Kusuhiko Hamaguchi (JPN)	(Japan) Hitoshi Yanae (KAS)	Sachiaki Kobayashi (JPN)	1:40.0
2010	Big Romance (JPN)	Katsuharu Tanaka (JPN)	(Japan) Michifumi Kono (JRA)	Senji Nishimura (JPN)	1:41.2
2011	Obruchev (USA)	Eiji Nakadate (JPN)	(Japan) Kiyoshi Hagiwara (JRA)	Koji Maeda (JPN)	1:41.6
2012	Someries (JPN)	Yusuke Fujioka (JPN)	(Japan) Kenichi Fujioka (JRA)	Princess Haya bint Hussein (JOR)	1:41.9
2013	Happy Sprint (JPN)	Mitsuyuki Miyazaki (JPN)	(Japan) Junji Tanaka (HOK)	Tsuji Bokujo (JPN)	1:40.4
2014	Dear Domus (JPN)	Kosei Miura (JPN)	(Japan) Yutaka Takahashi (JRA)	Dearest Co., Ltd. (JPN)	1:45.3
2015	Sound Sky (JPN)	Keita Tosaki (JPN)	(Japan) Masao Sato (JRA)	Yuichi Masuda (JPN)	1:43.1
2016	Rieno Tesoro (USA)	Hayato Yoshida (JPN)	(Japan) Ryo Takei (JRA)	Kenji Ryotokuji (JPN)	1:42.8
2017	Le Vent Se Leve (JPN)	Mirco Demuro (ITA)	(Japan) Kiyoshi Hagiwara (JRA)	G1 Racing (JPN)	1:41:6
2018	Nova Lenda (JPN)	Yuichi Kitamura (JPN)	(Japan) Takashi Saito (JRA)	Carrot Farm Co., Ltd. (JPN)	1:42.6
2019	Vacation (JPN)	Hiroto Yoshihara (JPN)	(Japan) Kenichi Takatsuki (KAW)	Masahiro Ogishi (JPN)	1:41.9
2020	Alain Barows (JPN)	Seiji Sakai (JPN)	(Japan) Masato Hayashi (FUN)	Hirotsugu Inokuma (JPN)	1:40.7
2021	Dry Stout (JPN)	Keita Tosaki (JPN)	(Japan) Mitsunori Makiura (JRA)	YGG Horse Club Co., Ltd. (JPN)	1:39.2
2022	Derma Sotogake (JPN)	Fuma Matsuwaka (JPN)	(Japan) Hidetaka Otonashi (JRA)	Hiroyuki Asanuma (JPN)	1:43.3
2023	Forever Young (JPN)	Ryusei Sakai (JPN)	(Japan) Yoshito Yahagi (JRA)	Susumu Fujita (JPN)	1:43.5
2024	Myriad Love (JPN)	Atsuya Nishimura (JPN)	(Japan) Koichi Shintani (JRA)	Asuka Shiraishi (JPN)	1:42.4
2025	Pyromancer (JPN)	Mirai Iwata (JPN)	(Japan) Keiji Yoshimura (JRA)	Godolphin (UAE)	1:44.2

== See also ==
- Horse racing in Japan
