= Saudi Derby =

Thoroughbred Horse Race in Saudi Arabia

- Class: Grade 3
- Location: Riyadh, Saudi Arabia
- Inaugurated: 2020
- Race type: Thoroughbred – Flat racing
- Website: https://jcsa.sa/en/saudi-cup/

Race information
- Distance: 1,600 meters
- Surface: Dirt
- Track: King Abdulaziz Racetrack
- Qualification: Three-year-old Thoroughbred
- Weight: NH: 55kg, SH: 59.5kg If there are no SH-bred: 57kg Filly allowance: 2kg
- Purse: $1,500,000

Saudi Derby (Arabic: الديربي السعودي) is an international horse race held at King Abdulaziz Racetrack in Riyadh, Saudi Arabia.

== Race details ==
The race was founded by the Saudi Arabia Jockey Club in 2020. It is currently run at 1,600 meters on dirt, only open to three-year-old thoroughbreds, with a prize money of 1.5 million USD.

Currently run as an undercard race on the Saudi Cup Night.

== History ==
- 2020 – Race was founded under the name "Samba Saudi Derby Cup".
- 2021 – Race name was changed to "Saudi Derby".
- 2022 – IFHA promotes the race to international grade 3.
- 2023 – A locally owned horse wins for the first time (Commissioner King).

In 2026 the event became a qualification event for the Euro/Mideast Road to the Kentucky Derby.

== Records ==
Speed Record:

- 1:36.17 – Forever Young (2024)

Most Wins by a Trainer:

- 2 – Hideyuki Mori (2020, 2021)

== Winners ==
| Year | Winner | Foaled | Trained | Owned | Jockey | Trainer | Owner | Time |
|---|---|---|---|---|---|---|---|---|
| 2020 | Full Flat | United States | Japan | Japan | Yutaka Take | Hideyuki Mori | Teruo Ono | 1:37.91 |
| 2021 | Pink Kamehameha | Japan | Japan | Japan | Keita Tosaki | Hideyuki Mori | Hisako Kimura | 1:38.57 |
| 2022 | Pinehurst | United States | United States | United States | Flavien Prat | Bob Baffert | SF Racing LLC, Starlight Racing & Madaket Stables | 1:38.12 |
| 2023 | Commissioner King | United States | Saudi Arabia | Saudi Arabia | Luis Morales | Sabah Alshammri | Faisal Mohammed Alqahtani | 1:38.82 |
| 2024 | Forever Young | Japan | Japan | Japan | Ryusei Sakai | Yoshito Yahagi | Susumu Fujita | 1:36.17 |
| 2025 | Golden Vekoma | United States | United Arab Emirates | United Arab Emirates | Connor Beasley | Ahmad Bin Harmash | Mohammed Al Suboosi | 1:38.185 |
| 2026 | Al Haram | Ireland | Saudi Arabia | Saudi Arabia | Ricardo Ferreira | Abdullah Alsidrani | Sheikh Abdullah Almalek Alsabah | 1:38.45 |

- Record Time: 1:36.17 – Forever Young

== See also ==
- Horses in Saudi Arabia
