= Forever Young (horse) =

Japanese-bred Thoroughbred racehorse (foaled 2021)

Forever Young フォーエバーヤング
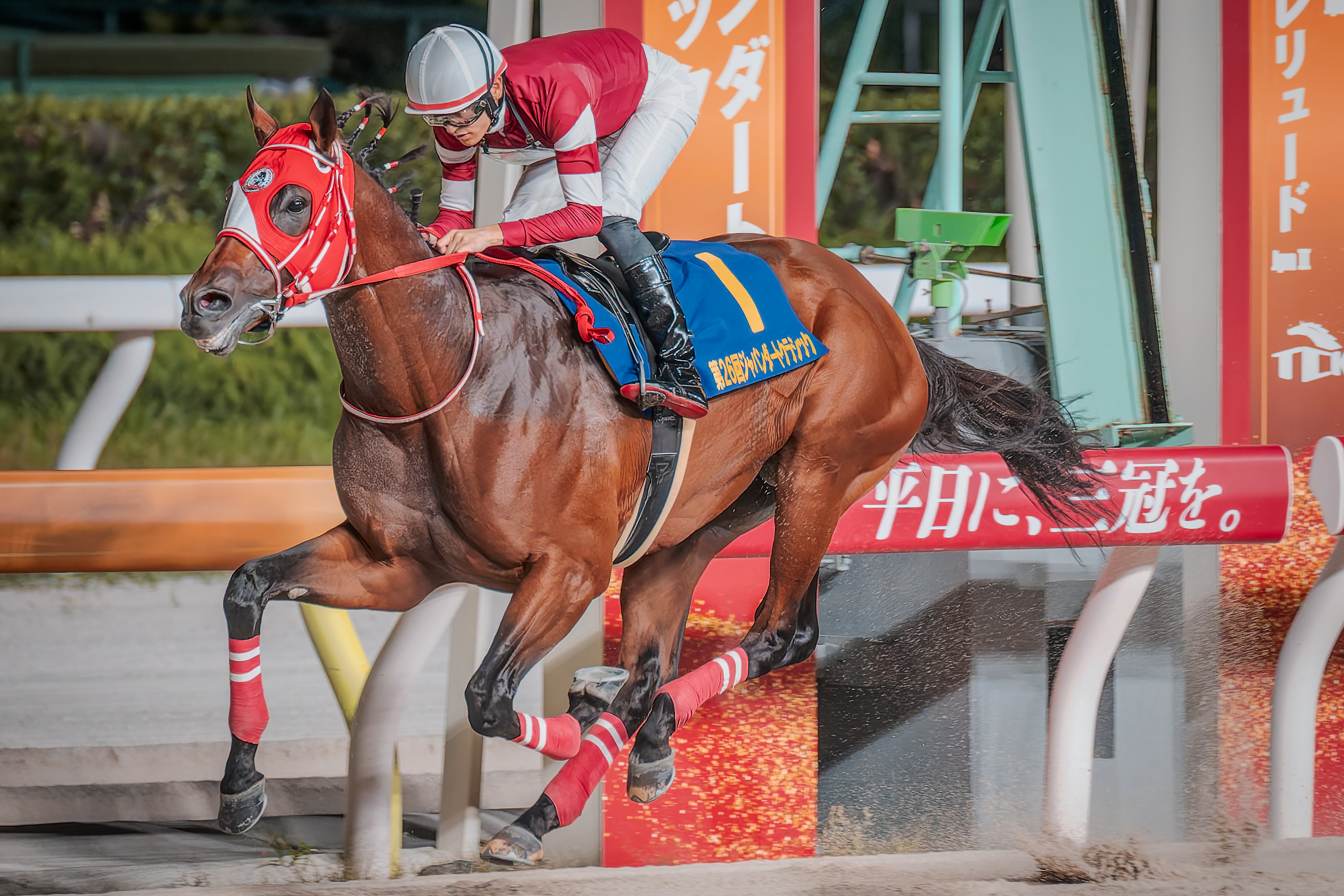
- Forever Young winning the Japan Dirt Classic in 2024
- Breed: Thoroughbred
- Sire: Real Steel (JPN)
- Grandsire: Deep Impact (JPN)
- Dam: Forever Darling (US)
- Damsire: Congrats (US)
- Sex: Stallion
- Foaled: February 24, 2021 (age 5)
- Country: Japan
- Colour: Bay
- Breeder: Northern Farm
- Owner: Susumu Fujita
- Racing colours
- Trainer: Yoshito Yahagi
- Jockey: Ryusei Sakai
- Record: 17: 12–1–3
- Earnings: ¥5,101,649,200 (Note: JPN: 294,200,000 JPY (JRA) : 7,200,000 JPY (NAR) : 287,000,000 JPY KSA : 20,900,000 USD (3,264,837,000 JPY) UAE : 4,180,000 USD (646,602,200 JPY) US : 5,820,000 USD (921,346,740 JPY) Earnings earned overseas are converted to JPY using the formula provided by JRA. 2024, 2025, 2026.)

Major wins
- JBC Nisai Yushun (2023); Zen-Nippon Nisai Yushun (2023); Saudi Derby (2024); UAE Derby (2024); Japan Dirt Classic (2024); Tokyo Daishōten (2024); Saudi Cup (2025, 2026); Nippon TV Hai (2025); Jockey Club Gold Cup (2026); Breeders' Cup wins: Breeders' Cup Classic (2025)

Awards
- JRA Special Award (2024); NAR Grand Prix Dirt Grade (Principal Dirt) Race Special Prize (2024); Japanese Horse of the Year (2025); JRA Award for Best Older Male Horse (2025); JRA Award for Best Dirt Horse (2025); American Champion Older Dirt Male (2025); NAR Grand Prix Special Award (2025)

Honours
- NTRA Moment of the Year (2025); Timeform rating: 131

Forever Young (Japanese: フォーエバーヤング, Fōebā Yangu; foaled February 24, 2021) is a Japanese Thoroughbred racehorse. His major racing wins include the Saudi Derby and the UAE Derby in 2024, the Breeders' Cup Classic in 2025, the Saudi Cup in 2025 and 2026, and the Jockey Club Gold Cup in 2026. He is the first Japanese-born and Japan-trained horse to win the Breeders' Cup Classic. He is also the first horse to win consecutive runnings of the Saudi Cup.

Forever Young was undefeated until running in the 150th Kentucky Derby, where he finished third behind Mystik Dan and Sierra Leone in a photo finish. In 2025, he was named the Japanese Horse of the Year, the first dirt horse in history to win the award, and the American Champion Older Dirt Male Horse, the first Japanese-trained horse to win an Eclipse Award in a dirt category.

== Background ==
Forever Young is a bay stallion bred by Northern Farm in Hokkaido, Japan, and was foaled on February 24, 2021. In 2022, he was offered at the JRHA Select Sale Yearling session and purchased by Susumu Fujita for ¥107,800,000. He was subsequently trained by Yoshito Yahagi. His sire, Real Steel, was a champion horse who won the Dubai Turf in 2016. His dam, Forever Darling, was an American racehorse who won the Grade II Santa Ynez Stakes in 2016.

His owner, Susumu Fujita, is the founder and chairman of CyberAgent, whose businesses include the internet television service Abema and the game developer Cygames.

Forever Young was named after a song of the same name by AK-69 featuring UVERworld. The song is the theme song of Abema's drama series Kaisha wa Gakkou janen da yo.

== Racing career ==
=== 2023: two-year-old season ===
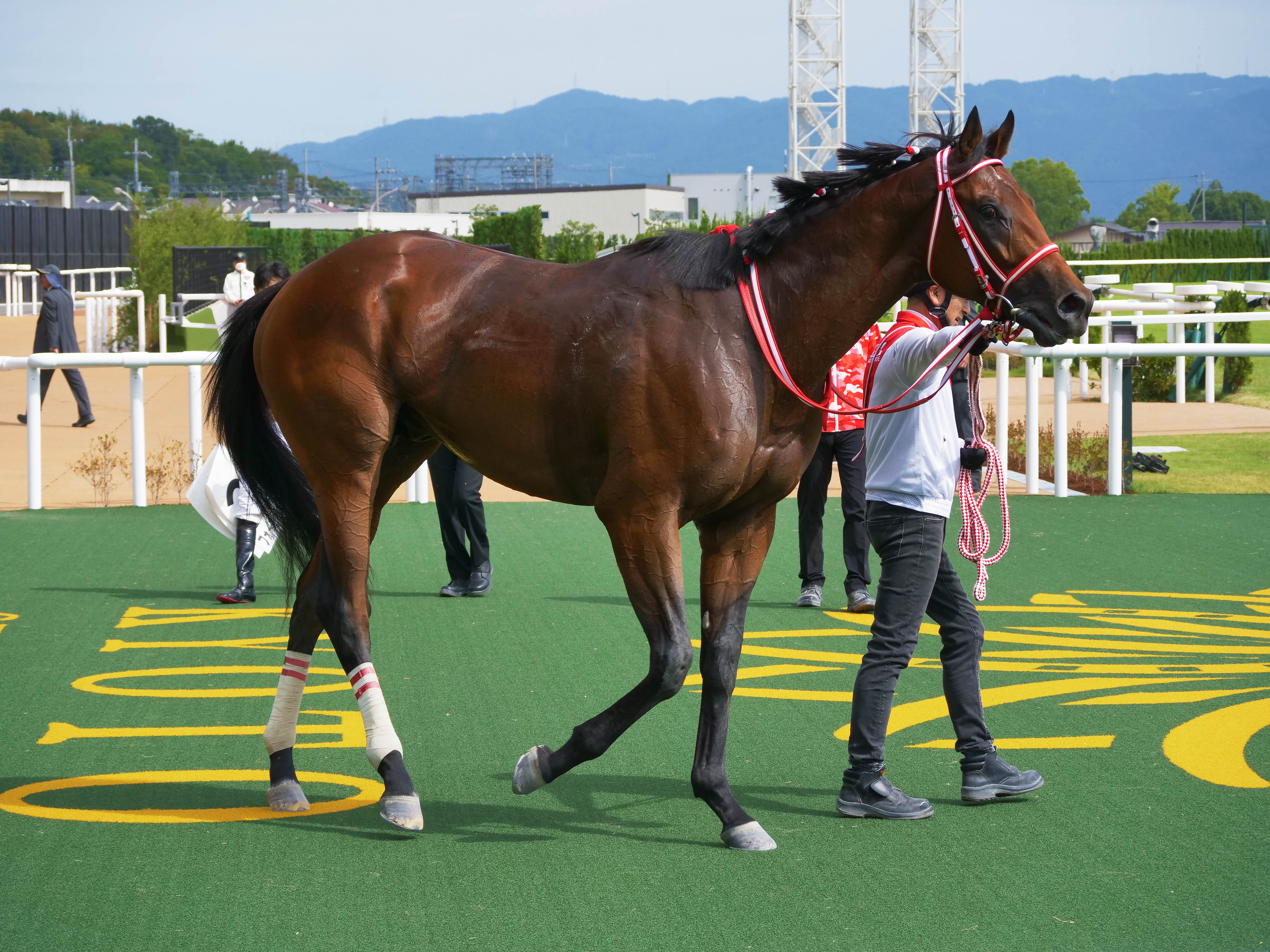
Forever Young at his maiden race

Forever Young began his racing career in a maiden race over 1,800 metres on a good dirt track at Kyoto Racecourse on October 14, 2023. Ridden by Ryusei Sakai, he started the 16/5 second choice and won by four lengths.

Sakai was again in the saddle when Forever Young contested the JBC Nisai Yushun, a JpnIII race over 1,800 metres at Mombetsu Racecourse on November 3. Starting the 6/5 favorite, he advanced from the middle of the field on the final turn and moved into contention entering the straight. He then pulled away to defeat Sunrise Zipangu by one-and-a-half lengths in 1:54.3.

On December 13 at Kawasaki Racecourse, Forever Young contested the Zen-Nippon Nisai Yushun, a JpnI race over 1,600 metres. Starting the 11/10 favorite, he moved forward early and tracked the leaders before making his move in the final turn. He took the lead in the straight and quickly drew clear to win by seven lengths from Aigle Noir, completing an unbeaten three-race season. It was the first JpnI victory for owner Susumu Fujita.

For his performance in 2023, he received a rating of 113 from JPN Thoroughbred Ranking, tying for second among two-year-olds overall. This was the highest rating awarded to a two-year-old dirt horse in the history of the ranking.

=== 2024: three-year-old season ===
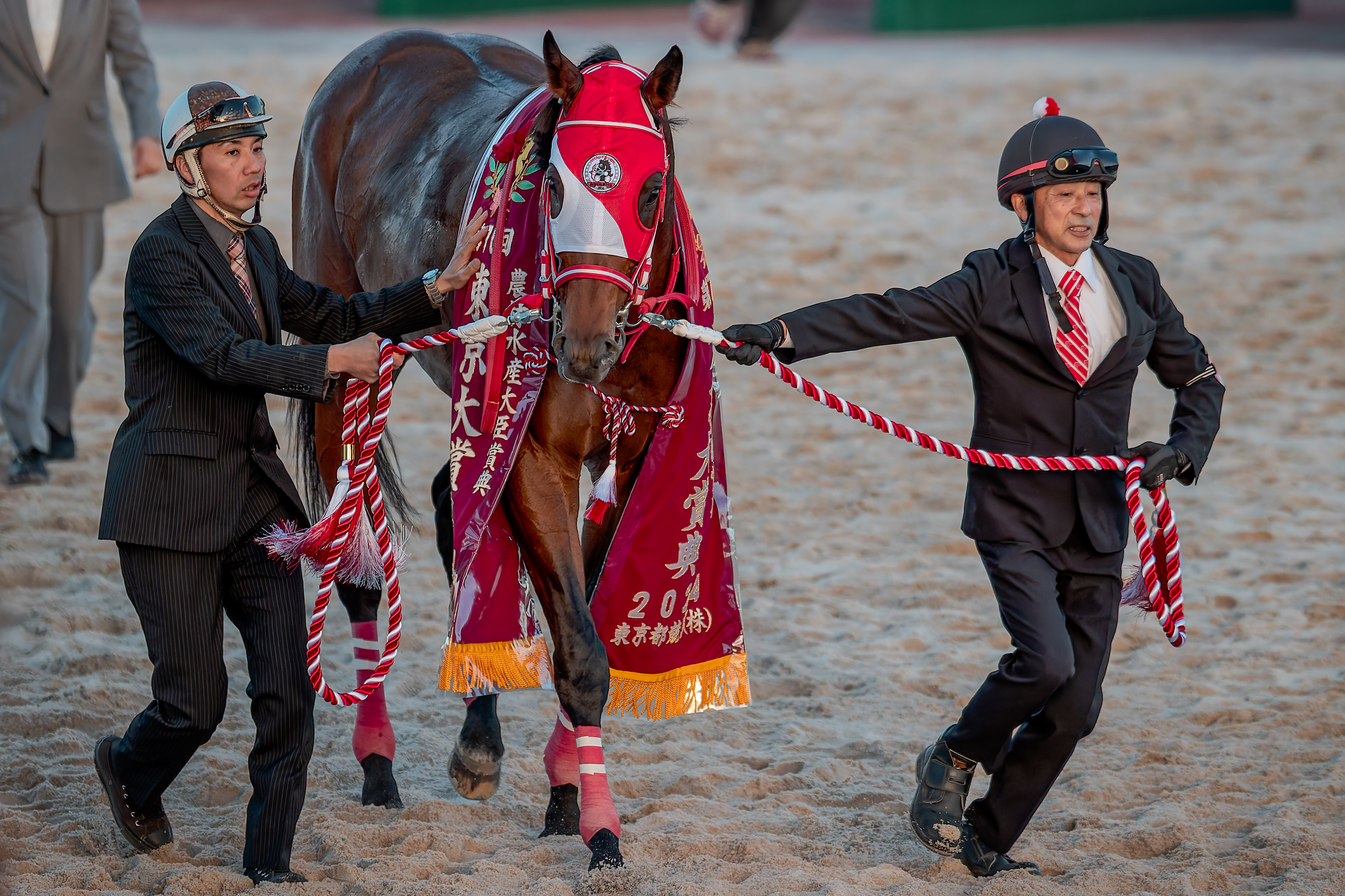
Forever Young after winning the Tokyo Daishoten

On his first run as a three-year-old, Forever Young went to Saudi Arabia to contest the Saudi Derby over 1,600 metres at King Abdulaziz Racetrack on February 24, 2024. Starting the 8/13 odds-on favorite, he had a slow start and found himself several lengths behind the leaders. He began closing the gap in the final straight and, after a prolonged battle with Book'em Danno, got up in the final strides to win by a head in 1:36.17. The victory was his first overseas graded-race win. After the race, trainer Yoshito Yahagi said the UAE Derby would be his next start in an effort to secure qualification for the 2024 Kentucky Derby.

On March 30, Forever Young contested the UAE Derby over 1,900 metres at Meydan Racecourse in Dubai. Drawn in gate 11, he raced outside and behind the leaders before beginning his move in the straight. Auto Bahn briefly took the lead, but Forever Young came through strongly to take command and win by two lengths in 1:57.89. Forever Young collected 100 points in the Road to the Kentucky Derby and entered the Kentucky Derby undefeated.

In the early morning hours of April 13, Forever Young arrived at Churchill Downs, where he was prepared by Yahagi for the Kentucky Derby. On May 4, he contested the 150th Kentucky Derby. Starting at odds of 7.03, he was slow from the gate and settled toward the rear of the 20-horse field. He began moving up from the outside before the third turn and continued his advance into the stretch, joining Mystik Dan and Sierra Leone in a three-way photo finish. Mystik Dan won by a nose over Sierra Leone, with Forever Young a further head back in third.

Forever Young returned to Japan following the Kentucky Derby and, after quarantine and recuperation at Northern Farm Hayakita, entered the Japan Dirt Classic at Ohi Racecourse on October 2. He briefly stumbled leaving the gate but recovered to settle in the middle of the field. He gradually advanced after the third corner, moved into the lead entering the final stretch, and held off Mikki Fight to win by 1 1/4 lengths in 2:04.1, earning his second JpnI title.

Following the Japan Dirt Classic, Forever Young returned to the United States for the Breeders' Cup Classic at Del Mar Fairgrounds on November 2. Starting at odds of 4.10, he raced near the inside before moving into contention around the final turn. He finished third behind Sierra Leone and Fierceness, 2 3/4 lengths behind the winner.

After the Breeders' Cup, Forever Young returned to Japan for his final race of the season, the Tokyo Daishōten at Ohi Racecourse on December 29. Starting as the 1.30 favorite, he raced in second behind the leaders before taking the lead in the stretch. He held off Ramjet and Wilson Tesoro to win by 1 3/4 lengths in 2:04.9, earning his first Grade I title and finishing the season undefeated in Japan.

For his performance in 2024, Forever Young received the JRA Special Award and the NAR Grand Prix Dirt Grade Race Special Prize. He received 103 votes for Best Three-Year-Old Colt, finishing second behind Japanese Derby winner Danon Decile by 41 votes. He also received the second-most votes for JRA Award for Best Dirt Horse (behind Lemon Pop) and Japanese Horse of the Year (behind Do Deuce).

=== 2025: four-year-old season ===
Forever Young received invitations to both the Saudi Cup and the Dubai World Cup, and accepted both.

On February 22, Forever Young returned to Saudi Arabia for the Saudi Cup over 1,800 metres at King Abdulaziz. Starting from post 14 at British odds of 11/8, he broke well and raced close to the leaders. After Romantic Warrior took the lead in the early part of the stretch, Forever Young changed leads and pursued him down the straight, gradually closing the gap before passing him in the final strides to win by a neck in 1:49.09. The victory was his first G1 win outside Japan and his fourth Grade I victory overall. It was also the first overseas Grade I victory for jockey Sakai and owner Susumu Fujita. Following the victory, Timeform rated him 131, at the time its highest rating for a dirt horse.

On April 5, Forever Young contested the Dubai World Cup over 2,000 metres at Meydan. Sent off as the 1.30 favorite, he raced in touch with the leaders but became less comfortable as the field approached the final turn. He was urged along in the backstretch but could not match the leaders in the straight, although he continued to finish third behind Hit Show and Mixto.

After a five-month break, Forever Young returned to Japan for the Nippon TV Hai over 1,800 metres at Funabashi Racecourse on October 1. Starting as the 1.10 favorite, he settled in fifth place before advancing to fourth and then third around the final turn. He moved into the lead in the straight and drew clear to defeat Revontulet by 2 1/2 lengths in 1:52.2. The victory gave him an automatic berth in the JBC Classic.

On November 1, Forever Young returned to Del Mar for a second attempt at the Breeders' Cup Classic. Starting at odds of 3.50, he was positioned more prominently than in the previous year's race, tracking in third behind Contrary Thinking and Fierceness through the early stages. Approaching the far turn, Sakai moved him to the front, and Forever Young opened a lead in the stretch. Sierra Leone closed strongly in the final furlong, but Forever Young held him off to win by half a length in 2:00.19. The victory made him the first horse trained in Japan to win the Breeders' Cup Classic.

For his performance in 2025, Forever Young was named the Japanese Horse of the Year, Best Older Male Horse, and Best Dirt Horse. He received 226 of 248 votes for Horse of the Year, 208 votes for Best Older Male Horse, and 230 votes for Best Dirt Horse. He also received the NAR Grand Prix Special Award. In January 2026, he was also named American Champion Older Dirt Male at the Eclipse Awards and received the NTRA Moment of the Year award.

=== 2026: five-year-old season ===
Forever Young returned to Saudi Arabia on February 14, 2026, to defend his victory in the Saudi Cup the previous year. Starting as the 1/3 favorite with British bookmakers, he broke well and settled behind the leaders along the inside rail, saving ground. Approaching the final turn, he remained close to the pace before moving through a gap along the inside at the head of the straight. He took the lead in the stretch and was challenged by Breeders' Cup Dirt Mile champion Nysos, but held him off under pressure from Ryusei Sakai to win by one length in 1:51.02, becoming the first horse to win the Saudi Cup in consecutive years. Trainer Yoshito Yahagi said that the Dubai World Cup would be his next target.

On March 28, Forever Young contested the Dubai World Cup over 2,000 metres at Meydan. Starting as the 1.60 favorite, he broke well and raced in second behind Magnitude, who set the pace down the backstretch. Forever Young moved closer approaching the final turn and challenged in the straight, but Magnitude maintained his advantage and held him off by one length. Forever Young finished second in 2:04.55, with Meydaan a further 2 3/4 lengths behind in third.

Following the Dubai World Cup, Yahagi's stable considered several options for Forever Young's autumn campaign. On June 21, the stable announced that he would remain in dirt racing and contest the Jockey Club Gold Cup at Belmont Park, followed by a defense of his Breeders' Cup Classic title at Keeneland. The other scenario under consideration had involved shipping to Europe for the Irish Champion Stakes at Leopardstown and the Prix de l'Arc de Triomphe at Longchamp, both turf races.

On September 18, Forever Young returned to the United States for the Jockey Club Gold Cup at Belmont Park, making his first start in nearly six months. The field was reduced to four horses after three scratches. Starting as the odds-on favorite, he tracked the early pace set by Phileas Fogg through a moderate tempo. Sakai moved him closer approaching the far turn, and Forever Young took control with three-eighths of a mile remaining. He drew clear in the stretch while racing on his left lead to win by 3 1/4 lengths in 2:01.23, with Stars and Stripes second and Baeza third. The victory earned him an automatic berth in the Breeders' Cup Classic. Yahagi said he was only 50 percent satisfied with Forever Young's performance.

Following the Jockey Club Gold Cup, Forever Young remained in New York to prepare for the Breeders' Cup Classic at Keeneland on October 31, where he was scheduled to defend his title. On October 31, he attempted to defend his Breeders' Cup Classic crown. As usual, he stayed close to the pace, but in the final straight he failed to accelerate, falling back and finishing in 5th place. This marked the first time that Forever Young had finished below the podium.

On November 8, Yahagi announced that if Forever Young exited quarantine in Japan in good condition, he would make his final career start in the Tokyo Daishōten on December 29. On the same day, owner Susumu Fujita said that Forever Young would stand stud at Shadai Stallion Station in 2027.

== In popular culture ==
An anthropomorphized version of Forever Young appears as a character in the Japanese multimedia franchise Umamusume: Pretty Derby, voiced by Shuri Miyumi. She is depicted as a creative, business-savvy gyaru with incredible talent in racing, marketing, and corporate leadership due to her upbringing as the daughter of a wealthy media corporation. Her design also features a fedora associated with Forever Young's trainer, Yoshito Yahagi. Following his victory in the 2025 Breeders' Cup Classic, the official Umamusume social media accounts teased a new character with a silhouette and the date "2026.02.24", leading to speculation that it was based on Forever Young. On February 16, 2026, Fujita confirmed in an interview with Idol Horse that Forever Young would appear in Umamusume. She was then officially revealed during the franchise's fifth-anniversary PakaLive TV broadcast on February 22, 2026. While already appearing in several in-game events, Forever Young at present is not yet a player-selectable trainee due to her counterpart still having an active racing career.

== Race record ==
Date	Distance (Condition)	Race	Class	Course	Odds (Favorite)	Field	Finish	Time	Winning (Losing) Margin	Winner (2nd Place)	Jockey	Ref
2023 – two-year-old season
Oct 14	1800 m (Good)	Two Year Old Debut	Maiden	Kyoto	4.20 (2nd)	14	1st	1:54.8	4 lengths	(Shiliushi)	Ryusei Sakai	
Nov 3	1800 m (Good)	JBC Nisai Yushun	Jpn3	Mombetsu	2.20 (1st)	12	1st	1:54.3	1 1/2 lengths	(Sunrise Zipangu)	Ryusei Sakai	
Dec 13	1600 m (Good)	Zen-Nippon Nisai Yushun	Jpn1	Kawasaki	2.10 (1st)	12	1st	1:43.5	7 lengths	(Aigle Noir)	Ryusei Sakai	
2024 – three-year-old season
Feb 24	1600 m (Fast)	Saudi Derby	G3	King Abdulaziz	-- (Note: Forever Young's final odds with British bookmakers were 8/13 odds-on since gambling is prohibited in the Kingdom of Saudi Arabia.)	12	1st	R1:36.17	head	(Book'em Danno)	Ryusei Sakai	
Mar 30	1900 m (Fast)	UAE Derby	G2	Meydan	1.55 (1st)	11	1st	1:57.89	2 lengths	(Auto Bahn)	Ryusei Sakai	
May 4	1 1/4 miles (Fast)	Kentucky Derby	G1	Churchill Downs	7.03 (3rd)	20	3rd	2:03.34	(head)	Mystik Dan	Ryusei Sakai	
Oct 2	2000 m (Firm)	Japan Dirt Classic	Jpn1	Ohi	1.70 (1st)	15	1st	2:04.1	1 1/4 lengths	(Mikki Fight)	Ryusei Sakai	
Nov 2	1 1/4 miles (Fast)	Breeders' Cup Classic	G1	Del Mar	4.10 (3rd)	14	3rd	2:00.78	(2 3/4 lengths)	Sierra Leone	Ryusei Sakai	
Dec 29	2000 m (Firm)	Tokyo Daishoten	G1	Ohi	1.30 (1st)	10	1st	2:04.9	1 3/4 lengths	(Wilson Tesoro)	Ryusei Sakai	
2025 – four-year-old season
Feb 22	1800 m (Fast)	Saudi Cup	G1	King Abdulaziz	-- (Note: Forever Young's final odds with British bookmakers were 11/8 since gambling is prohibited in the Kingdom of Saudi Arabia.)	14	1st	R1:49.09	neck	(Romantic Warrior)	Ryusei Sakai	
Apr 5	2000 m (Fast)	Dubai World Cup	G1	Meydan	1.30 (1st)	11	3rd	2:03.85	(2 lengths)	Hit Show	Ryusei Sakai	
Oct 1	1800 m (Good)	Nippon TV Hai	Jpn2	Funabashi	1.10 (1st)	10	1st	1:52.2	2 1/2 lengths	(Revontulet)	Ryusei Sakai	
Nov 1	1 1/4 miles (Fast)	Breeders' Cup Classic	G1	Del Mar	3.50 (2nd)	9	1st	2:00.19	1/2 length	(Sierra Leone)	Ryusei Sakai	
2026 – five-year-old season
Feb 14	1800 m (Fast)	Saudi Cup	G1	King Abdulaziz	-- (Note: Forever Young's final odds with British bookmakers were 1/3 odds-on since gambling is prohibited in the Kingdom of Saudi Arabia.)	14	1st	1:51.02	1 length	(Nysos)	Ryusei Sakai	
Mar 28	2000 m (Fast)	Dubai World Cup	G1	Meydan	1.60 (1st)	9	2nd	2:04.55	(1 length)	Magnitude	Ryusei Sakai	
Sep 18	1 1/4 miles (Fast)	Jockey Club Gold Cup	G1	Belmont Park	0.48 (1st)	4	1st	2:01.23	3 1/4 lengths	(Stars and Stripes)	Ryusei Sakai	
Oct 31	1 1/4 miles (Fast)	Breeders' Cup Classic	G1	Keeneland	1.73 (1st)	7	5th	2:00.92	(3 lengths)	Sovereignty	Ryusei Sakai	
Dec 29	2000 m (Firm)	Tokyo Daishoten	G1	Ohi								

- R in the chart and the time written in red indicates the horse finished in record time.

== Pedigree ==
Pedigree of Forever Young (JPN)
Sire Real Steel (JPN) (2012)	Deep Impact (JPN) (2002)	Sunday Silence (USA) (1986)	Halo (USA) (1969)
Sire Real Steel (JPN) (2012)	Deep Impact (JPN) (2002)	Sunday Silence (USA) (1986)	Wishing Well (USA) (1975)
Sire Real Steel (JPN) (2012)	Deep Impact (JPN) (2002)	Wind in Her Hair (IRE) (1991)	Alzao (USA) (1980)
Sire Real Steel (JPN) (2012)	Deep Impact (JPN) (2002)	Wind in Her Hair (IRE) (1991)	Burghclere (GB) (1977)
Sire Real Steel (JPN) (2012)	Loves Only Me (USA) (2006)	Storm Cat (USA) (1983)	Storm Bird (CAN) (1978)
Sire Real Steel (JPN) (2012)	Loves Only Me (USA) (2006)	Storm Cat (USA) (1983)	Terlingua (USA) (1976)
Sire Real Steel (JPN) (2012)	Loves Only Me (USA) (2006)	Monevassia (USA) (1994)	Mr. Prospector* (USA) (1970)
Sire Real Steel (JPN) (2012)	Loves Only Me (USA) (2006)	Monevassia (USA) (1994)	Miesque (USA) (1984)
Dam Forever Darling (USA) (2013)	Congrats (USA) (2000)	A.P. Indy (USA) (1989)	Seattle Slew (USA) (1974)
Dam Forever Darling (USA) (2013)	Congrats (USA) (2000)	A.P. Indy (USA) (1989)	Weekend Surprise (USA) (1980)
Dam Forever Darling (USA) (2013)	Congrats (USA) (2000)	Praise (USA) (1994)	Mr. Prospector* (USA) (1970)
Dam Forever Darling (USA) (2013)	Congrats (USA) (2000)	Praise (USA) (1994)	Wild Applause (USA) (1981)
Dam Forever Darling (USA) (2013)	Darling My Darling (USA) (1997)	Deputy Minister (CAN) (1979)	Vice Regent (CAN) (1967)
Dam Forever Darling (USA) (2013)	Darling My Darling (USA) (1997)	Deputy Minister (CAN) (1979)	Mint Copy (CAN) (1970)
Dam Forever Darling (USA) (2013)	Darling My Darling (USA) (1997)	Roamin Rachel (USA) (1990)	Mining (USA) (1984)
Dam Forever Darling (USA) (2013)	Darling My Darling (USA) (1997)	Roamin Rachel (USA) (1990)	One Smart Lady (USA) (1984)

- Forever Young is inbred 4S × 4D × 5D to the stallion Mr. Prospector.
- Forever Young and Sierra Leone are half first cousins through their shared ancestor Darling My Darling.
