= Ryusei Sakai =

Japanese jockey

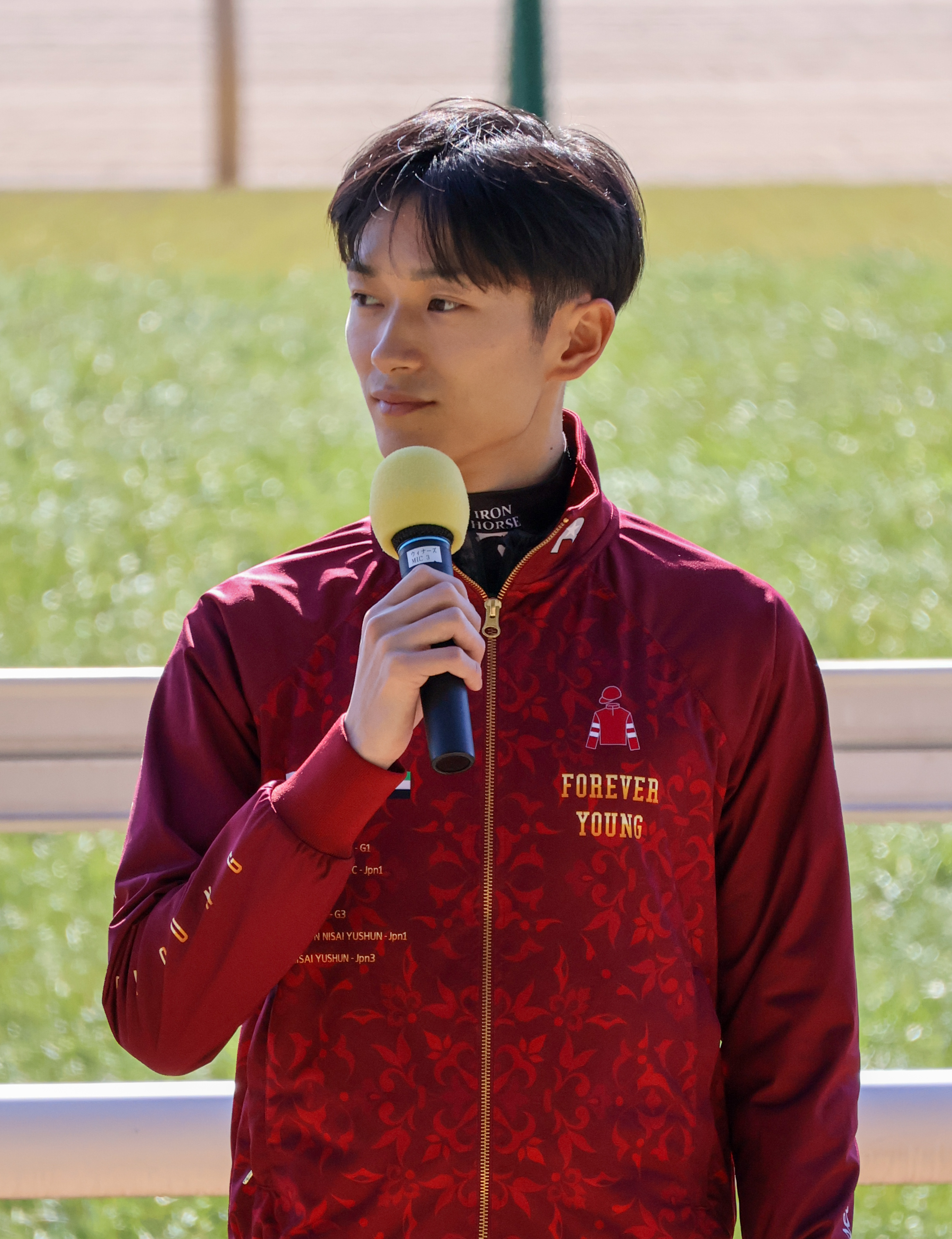
- Sakai in 2026

Personal information
- Native name: 坂井瑠星
- Nationality: Japanese
- Born: May 31, 1997 (age 29) Tokyo, Japan
- Occupation: Jockey
- Height: 170 cm (5 ft 7 in)
- Weight: 48 kg (106 lb)

Horse racing career
- Sport: Horse racing
- Career wins: 706 (JRA); 28 (NAR)

Major racing wins
- Japan Dirt Derby / Japan Dirt Classic (2020, 2024); Shuka Sho (2022); Asahi Hai Futurity Stakes (2022); February Stakes (2023); Mile Championship Nambu Hai (2023, 2024); Champions Cup (2023, 2024, 2025); Zen-Nippon Nisai Yushun (2023); Takamatsunomiya Kinen (2024); Sakitama Hai (2024); Tokyo Daishoten (2024); Saudi Cup (2025, 2026); Breeders' Cup Classic (2025); Churchill Downs Stakes (2026); Jockey Club Gold Cup (2026); Breeders' Cup Sprint (2026)

Significant horses
- Danon Pharaoh, Mad Cool, Forever Young, Lemon Pop, Stunning Rose, W Heart Bond, T O Elvis

Ryusei Sakai (Japanese: 坂井瑠星, romanized: Sakai Ryūsei, born May 31, 1997) is a Japanese jockey. He is most known as the jockey of Saudi Cup winner and Breeders' Cup Classic winner Forever Young.

== Background ==
Ryusei Sakai was born in 1997 to Hidemitsu Sakai, a jockey and later trainer of Oi Racecourse. He enrolled in The Horse Racing School in 2013 to earn his jockey license, before graduating in 2016.

Even before graduation, he apprenticed under Yoshito Yahagi, who, like Sakai, has ties to Oi Racecourse. After being issued his jockey license, he became the Yahagi stable's official jockey.

== Career ==
After debuting in March 2016, Sakai won his first race with Grand Prix Accel at a maiden race held at Hanshin Racecourse on April 2, 2016. Two weeks later, he was taken out of the races for a month following a racing accident involving 4 horses including his own which resulted in him breaking one of his ribs. In spite of this, he was able to win the most races of any rookie jockies in the Ritto Training Center.

Sakai raced in Australia from late 2017 to 2018 to improve his riding skills.

The 2020 Japan Dirt Derby, with Danon Pharaoh, was the first Grade I race Sakai won.

Sakai won his first JRA Grade I race with Stunning Rose in the 2022 Shuka Sho, where they defeated Stars on Earth, who was the favourite for race. Sakai then went on to win his second JRA Grade I race in a year with Dolce More when they won the Asahi Hai Futurity Stakes.

In February 2023, Sakai won the February Stakes with Lemon Pop. He and the horse would go on to win the Mile Championship Nambu Hai as well as the Champions Cup later that year. He would also win the JBC Nisai Yushun and the Zen-Nippon Nisai Yushun with Forever Young.

Following their consecutive wins at that year's Saudi and UAE Derbies, Sakai and Forever Young headed to the 2024 Kentucky Derby, where they were beaten by Mystik Dan and Sierra Leone in a photo finish and finished third.

=== 2025 with Forever Young ===
Sakai and Forever Young produced a ground breaking Saudi Cup win, beating Romantic Warrior by a neck and setting a Cup record time of 1.49.099, winning Forever Young's 4th Grade 1 race. In April 2025, they raced at the Dubai World Cup and came third in the race.

On November 1, 2025, Sakai and Forever Young attended the Breeders' Cup Championship in Del Mar to participate in the Breeders' Cup Classic for the 2nd time of Forever Young's Career (he came 3rd in 2024), the flagship race of the championship and one of the richest races in the world. They came into the week of the race 2nd favourite behind Sovereignty (Who won that years Kentucky Derby and Belmont Stakes) before Sovereignty was scratched the Tuesday before the race due to a high fever, which meant the odds leaned more towards Forever Young.

Sakai would end up winning the Breeders' Cup Classic with Forever Young, finishing in front of the 2024 Classic winner Sierra Leone, setting a time of 2:00.19, becoming the first Classic winner born and trained in Japan.

== Major wins ==
Grade(Group)1, and Japanese domestic grade(JpnI)
Japan

- Asahi Hai Futurity Stakes - (1) - Dolce More (2022)
- Champions Cup - (3) - Lemon Pop (2023, 2024), W Heart Bond (2025)
- February Stakes - (1) - Lemon Pop (2023)
- Japan Dirt Classic - (2) - Danon Pharaoh (2020), Forever Young (2024)
- Mile Championship Nambu Hai - (2) - Lemon Pop (2023, 2024)
- Sakitama Hai - (1) - Lemon Pop (2024)
- Shuka Sho - (1) - Stunning Rose (2022)
- Takamatsunomiya Kinen - (1) - Mad Cool (2024)
- Tokyo Daishōten - (1) - Forever Young (2024)
- Zen-Nippon Nisai Yushun - (1) - Forever Young (2023)

Saudi Arabia

- Saudi Cup - (2) - Forever Young (2025, 2026)

United States

- Breeders' Cup Classic - (1) - Forever Young (2025)
- Breeders' Cup Sprint - (1) - T O Elvis (2026)
- Churchill Downs Stakes - (1) - T O Elvis (2026)
- Jockey Club Gold Cup - (1) - Forever Young (2026)
