= Susumu Fujita (businessman) =

Japanese businessman and racehorse owner.

- 藤田 晋
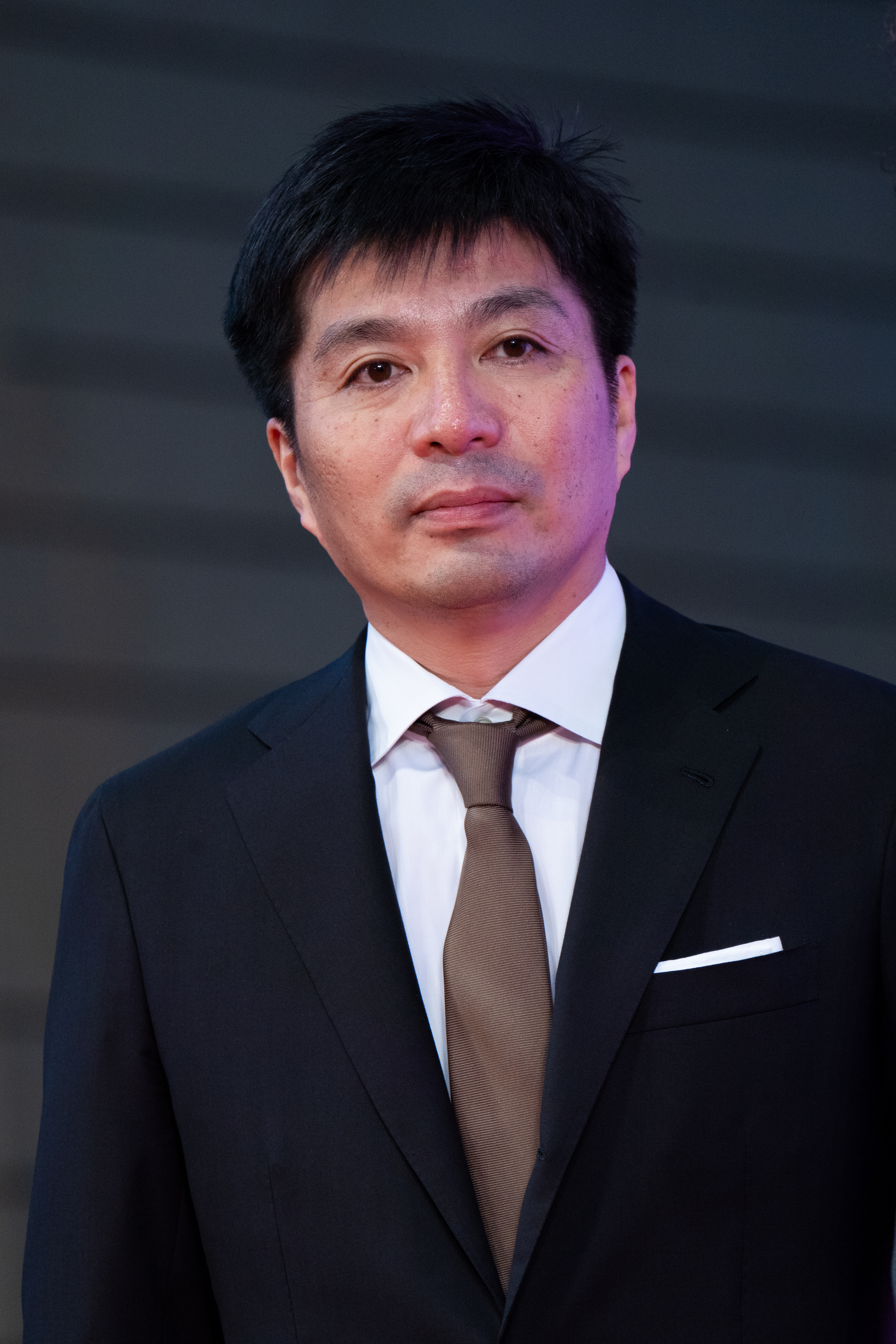
- Fujita in 2019
- Born: May 16, 1973 (age 53); Sabae, Fukui, Japan
- Education: Aoyama Gakuin University
- Occupations: Businessman, entrepreneur, racehorse owner
- Known for: Founder of CyberAgent
- Title: Representative Director and Chairman of CyberAgent
- Spouses: Megumi Okina (m. 2004; div. 2005); Former secretary (m. 2009)

Susumu Fujita (藤田 晋; born May 16, 1973) is a Japanese businessman, entrepreneur and racehorse owner. He founded CyberAgent in 1998 and served as its president until December 2025, when he became representative director and chairman. He is also president of AbemaTV, Inc. and president and chief executive officer of Zelvia, Inc., the operating company of FC Machida Zelvia.

== Early life and education ==
Fujita was born in Sabae, Fukui Prefecture, and spent his childhood there. He graduated from Fukui Prefectural Takefu High School and studied business administration at Aoyama Gakuin University.

While at university, Fujita became interested in mahjong and considered becoming a professional player. After graduating, he joined Intelligence, Ltd. (now Persol Career) in 1997.

== CyberAgent ==
Fujita founded CyberAgent in March 1998 and became its representative director and president. The company initially focused on Internet advertising.

In March 2000, CyberAgent was listed on the Tokyo Stock Exchange Mothers market. Fujita was 26 years old at the time and was described as the youngest person to take a company public on the market.

CyberAgent later expanded into media, games and other Internet businesses. The company established Cygames in 2011 and established AbemaTV, Inc. in 2015 with TV Asahi. The resulting streaming service launched in 2016 and was later renamed Abema.

In November 2025, CyberAgent announced that Fujita would step down as president and become representative director and chairman, with Takahiro Yamauchi becoming president. The transition took effect in December 2025.

== Football ==
In 2006, Fujita became vice president of Nippon Television Football Club, the company that operated Tokyo Verdy. CyberAgent had acquired a stake in the club, but withdrew from its management two years later.

In October 2018, CyberAgent acquired 80 percent of Zelvia, Inc., the company operating FC Machida Zelvia, for approximately ¥1.1 billion. Fujita became the club's owner. He became president and chief executive officer of Zelvia, Inc. in December 2022.

== Mahjong ==
Fujita has played mahjong since childhood and became heavily involved in the game during university. In December 2014, he won the Mahjong Saikyosen tournament.

In 2016, Fujita produced the Fujita Susumu Invitational RTD League, a professional mahjong tournament broadcast on Abema. He finished as runner-up in its inaugural season.

In July 2018, Fujita became the first representative director and chairman of the organization operating the M.League. He remains its chairman as of 2026.

== Horse ownership ==
Fujita at Tokyo Racecourse in 2026

Fujita had long been interested in horse racing. In 2020, his former mentor Yasuhide Uno gave him permission to become a racehorse owner, while jockey Yutaka Take also encouraged him to enter the sport.

In May 2021, Fujita purchased a Deep Impact colt at the Chiba Thoroughbred Sale for ¥470.1 million before tax. At the 2021 JRHA Select Sale, he purchased 18 horses for a combined ¥2.367 billion.

Fujita's registration as a racehorse owner with the Japan Racing Association was approved in July 2021. His racing silks are wine-colored with an embroidered shrimp design and two white rings on the sleeves.

His first racehorse to win a graded race was Jean Gros, which won the New Zealand Trophy in 2022.

=== Notable horses ===
- Forever Young – winner of the JBC Nisai Yushun and Zen-Nippon Nisai Yushun in 2023; the Saudi Derby, UAE Derby, Japan Dirt Classic and Tokyo Daishōten in 2024; the Saudi Cup and Breeders' Cup Classic in 2025; and the Saudi Cup and Jockey Club Gold Cup in 2026.
- Shin Emperor – winner of the Kyoto Nisai Stakes in 2023 and the Neom Turf Cup in 2025.
- Jean Gros – winner of the New Zealand Trophy in 2022.
- From Dusk - Winner of the 2025 CBC Sho.

==== Forever Young ====
Fujita's most successful racehorse is Forever Young, who became the first Japanese-born and trained horse to win the Breeders' Cup Classic in 2025 and the first horse to win consecutive runnings of the Saudi Cup in 2026.

In February 2026, Forever Young was announced as a character in Cygames' Umamusume: Pretty Derby franchise. Fujita said that having one of his horses appear in the franchise had been one of his goals when he became a racehorse owner.

== Personal life ==
Fujita married actress Megumi Okina in February 2004; they divorced in July 2005. He remarried in 2009.

Fujita has cited hip-hop and Rhymester among his musical interests. He is also known for his longstanding interest in mahjong and horse racing.

== Books ==
=== Author ===
- Japanese Dream: 26-Year-Old Listed Company President's e-Revolution Declaration (2000)
- Confessions of a President Working in Shibuya (2005)
- Susumu Fujita's Workology (2009)
- If You're Not Melancholic, It's Not Work (with Toru Kenjo) (2011)
- Growth Theory (2011)
- Entrepreneur (2013)
- Controlling Luck (with Shoichi Sakurai) (2015)
- Work is Mahjong, Mahjong is Work (2018)
- Training the Mind (with Takafumi Horie) (2022)
- Shobangan: The Thinking and Techniques of Reading Push and Pull (2025)

== See also ==
- CyberAgent
- Abema
- FC Machida Zelvia
- Horse racing in Japan
- Japanese mahjong
