= Kawasaki Racecourse =

Japanese racecourse

Kawasaki Racecourse 川崎競馬場
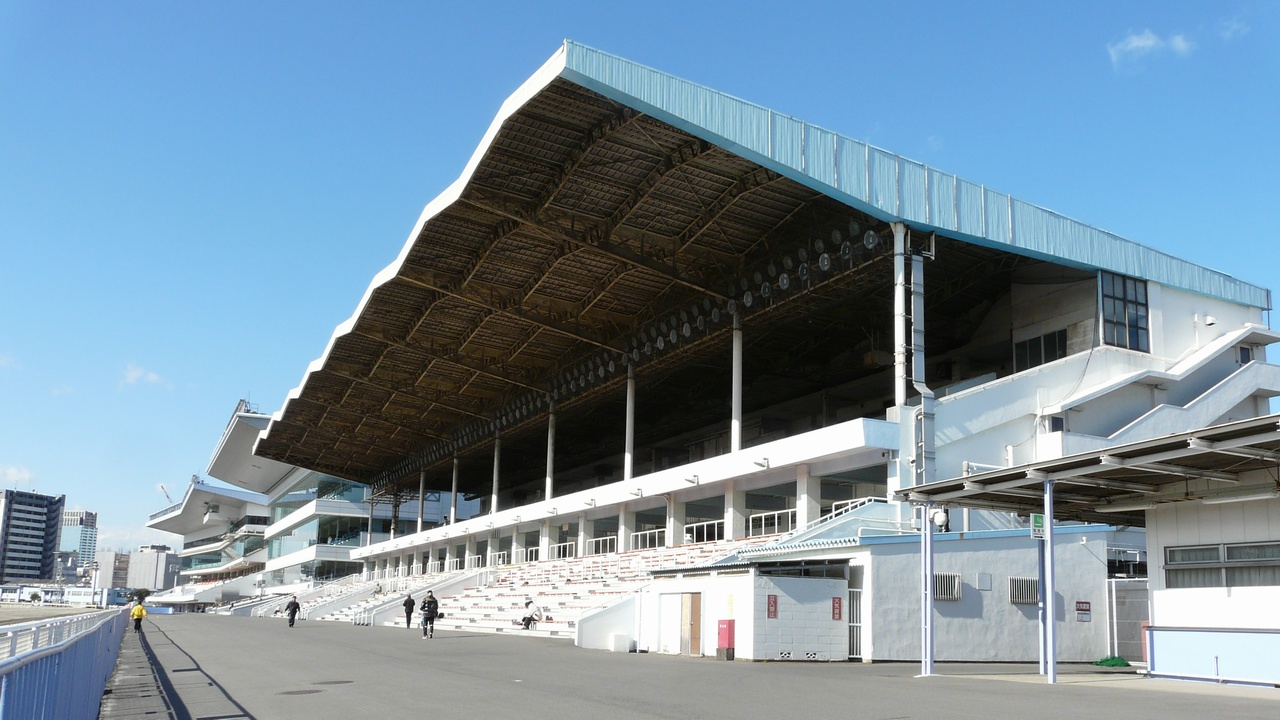
- Location: 5-1, Fujimi 1-chōme Kawasaki-ku Kawasaki, Kanagawa, Japan
- Coordinates: 35°31′49.28″N 139°42′48.84″E
- Owned by: Kanagawa Prefecture Kawasaki Racing Association
- Date opened: 1906
- Race type: Flat
- Course type: Dirt
- Notable races: Kawasaki Kinen (Jpn-I); Zen-Nippon Nisai Yushun (Jpn-I)

Kawasaki Racecourse (川崎競馬場, Kawasaki Keiba-jō) is located in Kawasaki, Kanagawa, Japan.

== Physical attributes ==
Kawasaki Racecourse has a left-handed (counter-clockwise) dirt course.

The dirt course measures 1200 meters (5/8 mile + 637 feet). 900m, 1400m, 1500m, 1600m, 2000m and 2100m races run on the oval.

== Notable races ==
Month	Race	Distance	Age/Sex
JPN I
Jan.	Kawasaki Kinen	Dirt 2100m	4yo +
Dec.	Zen-Nippon Nisai Yushun	Dirt 1600m	2yo
JPN II
Feb.	Empress Hai (Kiyofuji Kinen)	Dirt 2100m	4yo + f
Jun.	Kanto Oaks	Dirt 2100m	3yo f
JPN III
Jul.	Sparking Lady Cup (Hokuto Vega Memorial)	Dirt 1600m	3yo + f
