= 2003 Dubai World Cup =

Horse race held at Nad Al Sheba Racecourse in 2003

8th Dubai World Cup
- Dubai World Cup
- Location: Nad Al Sheba
- Date: 29 March 2003
- Winning horse: Moon Ballad (IRE)
- Jockey: Frankie Dettori
- Trainer: Saeed bin Suroor (GB/UAE)
- Owner: Godolphin

The 2003 Dubai World Cup was a horse race held at Nad Al Sheba Racecourse on Saturday 29 March 2003. It was the 8th running of the Dubai World Cup.

The winner was Godolphin's Moon Ballad, a four-year-old chestnut horse trained in Dubai by Saeed bin Suroor and ridden by Frankie Dettori. Moon Ballad's's victory was the second in the race for Dettori, the fourth for bin Suroor and the third for Godolphin.

Moon Ballad was originally trained in England by David Loder before being transferred to Saeed bin Suroor's stable in 2002. As a three-year-old he won the Dante Stakes and the Select Stakes as well as finishing third in the Epsom Derby and second in the Champion Stakes. He prepared for the World Cup by winning the second round of the Al Maktoum Challenge in February. In the 2003 Dubai World Cup he started the 11/4 second favourite and won by five lengths from the American challenger Harlan's Holiday with the 11/8 favourite Nayef a length away in third place.

== Race details ==
- Sponsor: none
- Purse: £3,750,000; First prize: £2,250,000
- Surface: Dirt
- Going: Fast
- Distance: 10 furlongs
- Number of runners: 11
- Winner's time: 2:00.48

== Full result ==
Pos.	Marg.	Horse (bred)	Age	Jockey	Trainer (Country)	Odds
1		Moon Ballad (IRE)	4	Frankie Dettori	Saeed bin Suroor (GB/UAE)	11/4
2	5	Harlan's Holiday (USA)	4	John R. Velazquez	Todd Pletcher (USA)	11/2
3	1	Nayef (USA)	5	Richard Hills	Marcus Tregoning (GB)	11/8 fav
4	shd	Grandera (IRE)	5	Jamie Spencer	Saeed bin Suroor (GB/UAE)	5/1
5	3	State Shinto (USA)	7	Johnny Murtagh	John D. Sadler (UAE)	100/1
6	nk	Grundlefoot (USA)	6	Sebastian Madrid	Kevin McAuliffe (USA)	20/1
7	6¾	Blue Burner (USA)	6	Kent Desormeaux	Bill Mott (USA)	66/1
8	2¼	Sei Mi (ARG)	7	J. A. Velez	Jerry Barton (KSA)	50/1
9	2¾	Aquarelliste (FR)	5	Dominique Boeuf	Élie Lellouche (FR)	15/2
10	7¾	Crimson Quest (IRE)	6	Alex Solis	Jerry Barton (KSA)	100/1
11	½	Hans Anderson (USA)	5	Wigberto Ramos	A. Mishreff (KSA)	66/1

- Abbreviations: DSQ = disqualified; nse = nose; nk = neck; shd = head; hd = head; nk = neck

== Winner's details ==
Further details of the winner, Moon Ballad

- Sex: Stallion
- Foaled: 4 March 1999
- Country: Ireland
- Sire: Singspiel; Dam: Velvet Moon (Shaadi)
- Owner: Godolphin
- Breeder: Newgate Stud
