= 1997 Dubai World Cup =

2nd Dubai World Cup
- Dubai World Cup
- Location: Nad Al Sheba
- Date: 3 April 1997
- Winning horse: Singspiel (IRE)
- Jockey: Jerry Bailey
- Trainer: Michael Stoute (GB)
- Owner: Sheikh Mohammed

The 1997 Dubai World Cup was a horse race held at Nad Al Sheba Racecourse on Thursday 3 April 1997. It was the 2nd running of the Dubai World Cup.

The winner was Sheikh Mohammed's Singspiel, a five-year-old bay horse trained in the United Kingdom by Michael Stoute and ridden by Jerry Bailey. Bailey had won the inaugural running of the race on Cigar in 1996.

Singspiel was an established international performer at the highest level, having won the Canadian International Stakes and the Japan Cup in 1996, but had never previously competed on dirt. In the 1997 Dubai World Cup Singspiel took the lead approaching the final furlong and won by one and a quarter lengths and one and a half length from Siphon and Sandpit, two Brazilian-bred horses trained in the United States by Richard Mandella. The Japanese mare Hokuto Vega was fatally injured in a fall approaching the straight, bringing down the British colt Bijou d'Inde.

== Race details ==
- Sponsor: none
- Purse: £2,380,852; First prize: £1,428,471
- Surface: Dirt
- Going: Fast
- Distance: 10 furlongs
- Number of runners: 12
- Winner's time: 2:01.91

== Full result ==
Pos.	Marg.	Horse (bred)	Age	Jockey	Trainer (Country)
1		Singspiel (IRE)	5	Jerry Bailey	Michael Stoute (GB)
2	1¼	Siphon (BRZ)	6	David Flores	Richard Mandella (USA)
3	1½'	Sandpit (BRZ)	8	Corey Nakatani	Richard Mandella (USA)
4	2½	Key of Luck (USA)	6	J. C. Arias	Kiaran McLaughlin (USA)
5	1½	Formal Gold (CAN)	4	Joe Bravo	W. Perry (USA)
6	2½	Juggler (AUS)	6	Glen Boss	Gai Waterhouse (AUS)
7	2½	Even Top (IRE)	4	Richard Hills	Mark Tompkins (GB)
8		Kammtarra (USA)	4	Frankie Dettori	Saeed bin Suroor (GB/UAE)
9	2½	Luso (GB)	5	Mick Kinane	Clive Brittain (GB)
10	nk	Flemensfirth (USA)	5	Gary Hind	John Gosden (GB)
Fell		Hokuto Vega (JPN)	7	Norihiro Yokoyama	Takao Nakano (JPN)
BD		Bijou d'Inde (GB)	4	Jason Weaver	Mark Johnston (GB)

- Abbreviations: DSQ = disqualified; nse = nose; nk = neck; shd = head; hd = head; nk = neck; dist = distance; BD = brought down

== Winner's details ==
Further details of the winner, Singspiel

- Sex: Stallion
- Foaled: 25 February 1992
- Country: Ireland
- Sire: In The Wings; Dam: Glorious Song (Halo)
- Owner: Sheikh Mohammed
- Breeder: Sheikh Mohammed
