= 1999 Dubai World Cup =

4th Dubai World Cup
- Dubai World Cup
- Location: Nad Al Sheba
- Date: 28 March 1999
- Winning horse: Almutawakel (GB)
- Jockey: Richard Hills
- Trainer: Saeed bin Suroor (GB/UAE)
- Owner: Hamdan Al Maktoum

The 1999 Dubai World Cup was a horse race held at Nad Al Sheba Racecourse on Sunday 28 March 1999. It was the 4th running of the Dubai World Cup.

The winner was Hamdan Al Maktoum's Almutawakel, a four-year-old bay colt trained in Dubai by Saeed bin Suroor and ridden by Richard Hills. Almutawakel's victory was the first in the race for his owner, trainer and jockey.

Almutawakel had been campaigned on turf in Europe in 1997 and 1998, recording his most important success Prix Jean Prat at Chantilly Racecourse in May 1998. The 1999 Dubai World Cup attracted a strong field including Silver Charm (the previous year's winner) and Victory Gallop from North America, while the Godolphin stable were represented by Daylami and High-Rise. Racing on dirt for the first time Almutawakel took the lead in the straight and won by three-quarters of a length from Malek with Victory Gallop three-quarters of a length away in third.

== Race details ==
- Sponsor: none
- Purse: £3,012,048; First prize: £1,807,229
- Surface: Dirt
- Going: Fast
- Distance: 10 furlongs
- Number of runners: 8
- Winner's time: 2:00.65

== Full result ==
Pos.	Marg.	Horse (bred)	Age	Jockey	Trainer (Country)
1		Almutawakel (GB)	4	Richard Hills	Saeed bin Suroor (GB/UAE)
2	¾	Malek (CHI)	6	Alex Solis	Richard Mandella (USA)
3	¾	Victory Gallop (CAN)	4	Jerry Bailey	W. Elliott Walden (USA)
4	1½	Central Park (IRE)	4	Daragh O'Donohue	Saeed bin Suroor (GB/UAE)
5	3	Daylami (IRE)	5	John R. Velazquez	Saeed bin Suroor (GB/UAE)
6	10	Silver Charm (USA)	5	Gary Stevens	Bob Baffert (USA)
7	nk	Running Stag (USA)	5	Ray Cochrane	Philip Mitchell (GB)
8	dist	High-Rise (IRE)	4	Frankie Dettori	Saeed bin Suroor (GB/UAE)

- Abbreviations: DSQ = disqualified; nse = nose; nk = neck; shd = head; hd = head; nk = neck; dist = distance

== Winner's details ==
Further details of the winner, Alutawakel

- Sex: Colt
- Foaled: 19 January 1995
- Country: Great Britain
- Sire: Machiavellian; Dam: Elfaslah (Green Desert)
- Owner: Hamdan Al Maktoum
- Breeder: Shadwell Stud
