= 2000 Dubai World Cup =

Horse race in Dubai

5th Dubai World Cup
- Dubai World Cup
- Location: Nad Al Sheba
- Date: 25 March 2000
- Winning horse: Dubai Millennium (GB)
- Jockey: Frankie Dettori
- Trainer: Saeed bin Suroor (GB/UAE)
- Owner: Godolphin

The 2000 Dubai World Cup was a horse race held at Nad Al Sheba Racecourse on Saturday 25 March 2000. It was the 5th running of the Dubai World Cup.

The winner was Godolphin's Dubai Millennium, a four-year-old bay colt trained in Dubai by Saeed bin Suroor and ridden by Frankie Dettori. Dubai Millennium's victory was the first in the race for Dettori, a second for bin Suroor and a first for Godolphin.

Dubai Millennium was one of the leading colts of his generation in Europe, winning the Prix Jacques le Marois and the Queen Elizabeth II Stakes in 1999. He made his debut on dirt at Nad Al Sheba on 2 March when he won a round of the Al Maktoum Challenge. In the 2000 Dubai World Cup he took the lead soon after the start and drew clear in the straight to win by six lengths from the American challenger Behrens with a gap of five and a half lengths to Public Purse in third place. The winning time of 1:59.50 was a new track record.

== Race details ==
- Sponsor: none
- Purse: £3,658,537; First prize: £2,195,122
- Surface: Dirt
- Going: Fast
- Distance: 10 furlongs
- Number of runners: 13
- Winner's time: 1:59.50

== Full result ==
| Pos. | Marg. | Horse (bred) | Age | Jockey | Trainer (Country) |
|---|---|---|---|---|---|
| 1 | | Dubai Millennium (GB) | 4 | Frankie Dettori | Saeed bin Suroor (GB/UAE) |
| 2 | 6 | Behrens (USA) | 6 | Jorge Chavez | Harold James Bond (USA) |
| 3 | 5½ | Public Purse (USA) | 6 | Corey Nakatani | Robert J. Frankel (USA) |
| 4 | hd | Puerto Madero (CHI) | 6 | Laffit Pincay | Richard Mandella (USA) |
| 5 | 3 | Ecton Park (USA) | 5 | Chris McCarron | W. Elliott Walden (USA) |
| 6 | 1¼ | World Cleek (JPN) | 5 | Kazuyoshi Kato | H Arai (JPN) |
| 7 | 2 | Running Stag (USA) | 6 | S. Sellers | Philip Mitchell (GB) |
| 8 | ½ | Indigenous (IRE) | 7 | Basil Marcus | Ivan Allan (HK) |
| 9 | ¾ | Lear Spear (USA) | 5 | Neil Pollard | David Elsworth (GB) |
| 10 | 2½ | Saint's Honor (USA) | 4 | Kent Desormeaux | Craig Dollase (USA) |
| 11 | 3 | Strudel Fitz (ARG) | 5 | John R. Velazquez | J. Veitch (KSA) |
| 12 | 5 | Gracioso (USA) | 4 | Sylvain Guillot | Saeed bin Suroor (GB/UAE) |
| 13 | ¾ | Worldly Manner (USA) | 4 | Jerry Bailey | Saeed bin Suroor (GB/UAE) |

- Abbreviations: DSQ = disqualified; nse = nose; nk = neck; shd = head; hd = head; nk = neck

== Winner's details ==
Further details of the winner, Dubai Millennium

- Sex: Stallion
- Foaled: 20 March 1996
- Country: Great Britain
- Sire: Seeking The Gold; Dam: Colorado Dancer (Shareef Dancer)
- Owner: Godolphin
- Breeder: Sheikh Mohammed
