= 1998 Dubai World Cup =

3rd Dubai World Cup
- Dubai World Cup
- Location: Nad Al Sheba
- Date: 28 March 1998
- Winning horse: Silver Charm (USA)
- Jockey: Gary Stevens
- Trainer: Bob Baffert (USA)
- Owner: Beverly & Robert B. Lewis

The 1998 Dubai World Cup was a horse race held at Nad Al Sheba Racecourse on Saturday 28 March 1998. It was the 3rd running of the Dubai World Cup.

The winner was Beverly & Robert B. Lewis's Silver Charm, a four-year-old gray colt trained in the United States by Bob Baffert and ridden by Gary Stevens. Silver Charm's victory was the first in the race for his owner, trainer and jockey.

Silver Charm was named American Champion Three-Year-Old Male Horse for 1997 when he won the Kentucky Derby and the Preakness Stakes. Before being shipped to Dubai he won San Fernando Stakes in January and the Strub Stakes in February. In the 1998 Dubai World Cup Silver Charm took the lead approaching the final quarter mile and held off the late challenge of the Godolphin runner Swain by a short head with the French challenger Loup Sauvage two and a half lengths back in third place.

== Race details ==
- Sponsor: none
- Purse: £2,439,024; First prize: £1,463,415
- Surface: Dirt
- Going: Fast
- Distance: 10 furlongs
- Number of runners: 9
- Winner's time: 2:04.29

== Full result ==
Pos.	Marg.	Horse (bred)	Age	Jockey	Trainer (Country)
1		Silver Charm (USA)	4	Gary Stevens	Bob Baffert (USA)
2	shd	Swain (IRE)	6	Mick Kinane	Saeed bin Suroor (GB/UAE)
3	2½	Loup Sauvage (USA)	4	Olivier Peslier	André Fabre (FR)
4	shd	Malek (CHI)	5	Alex Solis	Richard Mandella (USA)
5	15	Behrens (USA)	4	Jerry Bailey	Harold James Bond (USA)
6	5	Kyoto City (JPN)	7	Mikio Matsunaga	K Nakao (JPN)
7	hd	Luso (GB)	6	Pat Eddery	Clive Brittain (GB)
8	5½	Borgia (GER)	4	Kieren Fallon	Andreas Schütz (GER)
9	11	Predappio (IRE)	5	Frankie Dettori	Saeed bin Suroor (GB/UAE)

- Abbreviations: DSQ = disqualified; nse = nose; nk = neck; shd = head; hd = head; nk = neck; dist = distance

== Winner's details ==
Further details of the winner, Silver Charm

- Sex: Colt
- Foaled: 22 February 1994
- Country: United States
- Sire: Silver Buck; Dam: Bonnie's Poker (Poker)
- Owner: Beverly & Robert B. Lewis
- Breeder: Mary Wootton
