= 2004 Dubai World Cup =

9th Dubai World Cup
- Dubai World Cup
- Location: Nad Al Sheba
- Date: 27 March 2004
- Winning horse: Pleasantly Perfect (USA)
- Jockey: Alex Solis
- Trainer: Richard Mandella (USA)
- Owner: Diamond A Racing Corporation

The 2004 Dubai World Cup was a horse race held at Nad Al Sheba Racecourse on Saturday 27 March 2004. It was the 9th running of the Dubai World Cup.

The winner was Diamond A Racing Corporation's Pleasantly Perfect, a six-year-old brown horse trained in the United States by Richard Mandella and ridden by Alex Solis. Pleasantly Perfect's victory was the first in the race for his owner, trainer and jockey.

Pleasantly Perfect had been one of the leading dirt performers in the United States in 2003 when his wins included the Breeders' Cup Classic. Before being shipped to Dubai he won the San Antonio Handicap on 31 January. In the 2004 Dubai World Cup he started the 5/2 second favourite and won by three quarters of a length from the 2/1 favourite Medaglia d'Oro with the South African challenger Victory Moon five length back in third place.

== Race details ==
- Sponsor: none
- Purse: £3,351,955; First prize: £2,011,173
- Surface: Dirt
- Going: Fast
- Distance: 10 furlongs
- Number of runners: 12
- Winner's time: 2:00.24

== Full result ==
Pos.	Marg.	Horse (bred)	Age	Jockey	Trainer (Country)	Odds
1		Pleasantly Perfect (USA)	6	Alex Solis	Richard Mandella (USA)	5/2
2	¾	Medaglia d'Oro (USA)	5	Jerry Bailey	Robert J. Frankel (USA)	2/1 fav
3	5	Victory Moon (SAF)	5	Weichong Marwing	Mike de Kock (SAF)	4/1
4	7¾	Grand Hombre (USA)	4	Frankie Dettori	Saeed bin Suroor (GB/UAE)	12/1
5	4	Qaayed Alkhail** (GER)	7	Mick Kinane	Jerry Barton (KSA)	66/1
6	4	Domestic Dispute (USA)	4	Gary Stevens	Patrick Gallagher (UA)	22/1
7	nk	Fleetstreet Dancer (USA)	6	J. K. Court	Doug O'Neill (USA)	16/1
8	2¼	Admire Don (JPN)	5	Katsumi Ando	Hiroyoshi Matsuda (JPN)	11/1
9	1¾	Regent Bluff (JPN)	8	Yutaka Yoshida	Yokichi Okubo (JPN)	40/1
10	7¾	Dinyeper (GB)	5	Halis Karatas	Ayhan Kasar (TUR)	40/1
11	3¼	State Shinto (USA)	8	Ted Durcan	M Al Kurdi (UAE)	66/1
12	13	Silent Deal (JPN)	4	Yutaka Take	Yasuo Ikee (JPN)	25/1

- Abbreviations: DSQ = disqualified; nse = nose; nk = neck; shd = head; hd = head; nk = neck
- Qaayed Alkhail also competed as King's Boy

== Winner's details ==
Further details of the winner, Pleasantly Perfect

- Sex: Stallion
- Foaled: 4 February 1998
- Country: United States
- Sire: Pleasant Colony; Dam: Regal State (Affirmed)
- Owner: Diamond A Racing Corporation
- Breeder: Clovelly Farm
