= 1996 Dubai World Cup =

1st Dubai World Cup
- Dubai World Cup
- Location: Nad Al Sheba
- Date: 27 March 1996
- Winning horse: Cigar (USA)
- Jockey: Jerry Bailey
- Trainer: Bill Mott (USA)
- Owner: Allen Paulson

The 1996 Dubai World Cup was a horse race held at Nad Al Sheba Racecourse on Wednesday 27 March 1996. It was the inaugural running of the Dubai World Cup.

The winner was Allen Paulson's Cigar, a six-year-old bay horse trained in the United States by Bill Mott and ridden by Jerry Bailey.

Cigar had been the dominant racehorse in the United States in 1995, winning eight Grade I races including the Breeders' Cup Classic and being voted American Horse of the Year. Before being shipped to Dubai he had added another Grade I success when winning the Donn Handicap in February. The 1996 Dubai World Cup also attracted competitors from the United Kingdom, Australia and Japan as well as four locally trained runners. Cigar took the lead a quarter of a mile from the finish and held off the challenge of Burt Bacharach's Soul of the Matter to win by half a length. L'Carriere, who had finished second to Cigar in the Breeders' Cup Classic, completed a 1-2-3 for American trained horses as he got the better of a struggle with the British colt Pentire for third place.

== Race details ==
- Sponsor: none
- Purse: £2,580,645; First prize: £1,548,387
- Surface: Dirt
- Going: Fast
- Distance: 10 furlongs
- Number of runners: 11
- Winner's time: 2:03.84

== Full result ==
Pos.	Marg.	Horse (bred)	Age	Jockey	Trainer (Country)
1		Cigar (USA)	6	Jerry Bailey	Bill Mott (USA)
2	½	Soul of the Matter (USA)	5	Gary Stevens	Richard Mandella (USA)
3	8	L'Carriere (USA)	5	Jorge F. Chavez	H. James Bond (USA)
4	¾	Pentire (GB)	4	Michael Hills	Geoff Wragg (GB)
5	3½	Tamayaz (CAN)	4	Chris McCarron	Saeed bin Suroor (GB/UAE)
6	6	Lively Mount (JPN)	5	Mamoru Ishibashi	Fujio Shibata (JPN)
7	1	Needle Gun (IRE)	6	Brett Doyle	Clive Brittain (GB)
8	¾	Torrential (USA)	4	Olivier Peslier	Saeed bin Suroor (GB/UAE)
9	3	Larrocha (GB)	4	Pat Eddery	Saeed bin Suroor (GB/UAE)
10		Halling (USA)	5	Frankie Dettori	Saeed bin Suroor (GB/UAE)
11		Danewin (AUS)	5	Damien Oliver	Robert Thomsen (AUS)

- Abbreviations: DSQ = disqualified; nse = nose; nk = neck; shd = head; hd = head; nk = neck; dist = distance; BD = brought down

== Winner's details ==
Further details of the winner, Cigar

- Sex: Stallion
- Foaled: 18 April 1990
- Country: United States
- Sire: Palace Music; Dam: Solar Slew (Seattle Slew)
- Owner: Allen Paulson
- Breeder: Allen Paulson
