= 2007 Dubai World Cup =

12th Dubai World Cup
- Dubai World Cup
- Location: Nad Al Sheba
- Date: 31 March 2007
- Winning horse: Invasor (ARG)
- Jockey: Fernando Jara
- Trainer: Kiaran McLaughlin (USA)
- Owner: Hamdan Al Maktoum

The 2007 Dubai World Cup was a horse race held at Nad Al Sheba Racecourse on Saturday 31 March 2007. It was the 12th running of the Dubai World Cup.

The winner was Hamdan Al Maktoum's Argentinian-bred Invasor, a five-year-old brown horse trained in the United States by Kiaran McLaughlin and ridden by Fernando Jara. Curlin's victory was the first in the race for his jockey and trainer and the second for Hamdan Al Maktoum, who had won the race with Almutawakel in 1999.

Originally trained in Uruguay, Invasor won the local Triple Crown before being bought by Hamdan Al Maktoum and transferred to McLaughlin's American stable. On his debut for his new connections he sustained his only defeat when finishing fourth to Discreet Cat in the UAE Derby. He was voted American Horse of the Year for 2006 after winning the Pimlico Special, Suburban Handicap, Whitney Handicap and Breeders' Cup Classic. In 2007 he won the Donn Handicap before being shipped to Dubai. In the 2007 Dubai World Cup he started the 5/4 favourite and won by one and three quarter lengths from the American-trained Premium Tap, with the Hong Kong challenger Bullish Luck eight lengths back in third. Discreet Cat started the 11/8 second favourite but finished last of the seven runners.

== Race details ==
- Sponsor: Emirates
- Purse: £3,061,224; First prize: £1,836,735
- Surface: Dirt
- Going: Fast
- Distance: 10 furlongs
- Number of runners: 7
- Winner's time: 1:59.97

== Full result ==
Pos.	Marg.	Horse (bred)	Age	Jockey	Trainer (Country)	Odds
1		Invasor (ARG)	5	Fernando Jara	Kiaran McLaughlin (USA)	5/4 fav
2	1¾	Premium Tap (USA)	5	Kent Desormeaux	John C. Kimmel (USA)	7/1
3	8	Bullish Luck (USA)	8	Brett Prebble	Anthony S. Cruz (HK)	40/1
4	5¼	Vermilion (JPN)	5	Christophe Lemaire	Sei Ishizaka (JPN)	33/1
5	2½	Forty Licks (ARG)	5	Mick Kinane	Ian Jory (KSA)	18/1
6	2¾	Kandidate (GB)	5	Seb Sanders	Clive Brittain (GB)	22/1
7	2¾	Discreet Cat (USA)	4	Frankie Dettori	Saeed bin Suroor (GB/UAE)	11/8

- Abbreviations: nse = nose; nk = neck; shd = head; hd = head; nk = neck

== Winner's details ==
Further details of the winner, Invasor

- Sex: Stallion
- Foaled: 3 August 2002
- Country: Argentina
- Sire: Candy Stripes; Dam: Quendom (Interprete)
- Owner: Hamdan Al Maktoum
- Breeder: Haras Clausan
