= 2008 Dubai World Cup =

13th Dubai World Cup
- Dubai World Cup
- Location: Nad Al Sheba
- Date: 29 March 2008
- Winning horse: Curlin (USA)
- Jockey: Robby Albarado
- Trainer: Steve Asmussen (USA)
- Owner: Stonestreet Stables & Midnight Cry Stables

The 2008 Dubai World Cup was a horse race held at Nad Al Sheba Racecourse on Saturday 29 March 2008. It was the 13th running of the Dubai World Cup.

The winner was Stonestreet Stables & Midnight Cry Stables' Curlin, a four-year-old chestnut colt trained in the United States by Steve Asmussen and ridden by Robby Albarado. Curlin's victory was the first in the race for his jockey, trainer and owner.

Curlin had been the American Horse of the Year in 2007 when his wins included the Preakness Stakes and the Breeders' Cup Classic. He was sent to Dubai in early 2008 and won a handicap race at Nad Al Sheba on 28 February. In the 2008 Dubai World Cup he started the 4/11 favourite and won by a record margin of seven and three quarter lengths from the South African-trained Asiatic Boy, with Well Armed a neck away in third.

== Race details ==
- Sponsor: Emirates
- Purse: £3,015,075; First prize: £1,809,045
- Surface: Dirt
- Going: Fast
- Distance: 10 furlongs
- Number of runners: 12
- Winner's time: 2:01.15

== Full result ==
Pos.	Marg.	Horse (bred)	Age	Jockey	Trainer (Country)	Odds
1		Curlin (USA)	4	Robby Albarado	Steve Asmussen (USA)	4/11 fav
2	7¾	Asiatic Boy (ARG)	5	Johnny Murtagh	Mike de Kock (SAF)	10/1
3	nk	Well Armed (USA)	5	Aaron Gryder	Eoin Harty (USA)	66/1
4	¾	A P Arrow (USA)	6	Ramon Domínguez	Todd Pletcher (USA)	33/1
5	1	Great Hunter (USA)	4	Garrett Gomez	Doug O'Neill (USA)	100/1
6	½	Lucky Find (SAF)	5	K. Shea	Mike de Kock (SAF)	66/1
7	5¼	Jalil (USA)	4	Frankie Dettori	Saeed bin Suroor (GB/UAE)	5/1
8	1	Gloria de Campeao (BRZ)	5	Christophe Lemaire	Pascal Bary (FR)	50/1
9	12	Premium Tap (USA)	6	Sebastian Madrid	J. Gardel (KSA)	25/1
10	4½	Sway Yed (KSA)	7	Olivier Peslier	Saud Saad Alkahtani (KSA)	150/1
11	2	Kocab (GB)	6	Stéphane Pasquier	André Fabre (FR)	40/1
12	4½	Vermilion (JPN)	6	Yutaka Take	Sei Ishizaka (JPN)	10/1

- Abbreviations: nse = nose; nk = neck; shd = head; hd = head; nk = neck

== Winner's details ==
Further details of the winner, Curlin

- Sex: Colt
- Foaled: 25 March 2004
- Country: United States
- Sire: Smart Strike; Dam: Sheriff's Deputy (Deputy Minister)
- Owner: Stonestreet Stables & Midnight Cry Stables
- Breeder: Fares Farm
