= 2015 Dubai World Cup =

Horse race held at Meydan Racecourse

20th Dubai World Cup
- Dubai World Cup
- Location: Meydan
- Date: 28 March 2015
- Winning horse: Prince Bishop (GB)
- Jockey: William Buick
- Trainer: Saeed bin Suroor (GB/UAE)
- Owner: Hamdan bin Mohammed Al Maktoum
- Surface: Dirt

The 2015 Dubai World Cup was a horse race held at Meydan Racecourse on Saturday 28 March 2015. It was the 20th running of the Dubai World Cup. It was the first running of the race since the synthetic Tapeta surface was replaced by a dirt track.

The winner was Hamdan bin Mohammed Al Maktoum's Prince Bishop, an eight-year-old bay gelding trained in Dubai by Saeed bin Suroor and ridden by William Buick. Prince Bishop's victory was the first in the race for his jockey, the seventh for his trainer and the first for his owner.

== The contenders ==
The return to dirt saw a strong North American challenge, headed by the American Horse of the Year California Chrome, winner of the Kentucky Derby and Preakness Stakes. The other runners from the United States were Lea, the six-year-old winner of the 2014 Donn Handicap and the four-year-old Candy Boy (Robert B. Lewis Stakes), who had recently been transferred to race for a UAE-based stable. The two-horse Saeed bin Suroor/ Godolphin entry comprised African Story (winner of the race in 2014) and Prince Bishop, who was contesting the race for the fourth time, having finished tenth in 2011, seventh in 2013 and ninth in 2014. Japan sent two representatives; Hokku Tarumae, a dirt specialist who had won the Champions Cup and been named Champion Dirt Horse at the JRA Awards, and the Japan Cup winner Epiphaneia, rated the second-best racehorse in the world in the 2014 World's Best Racehorse Rankings. The sole European runner was the much-travelled British eight-year-old Side Glance (whose biggest win had come in the 2013 Mackinnon Stakes) and the nine-runner field was completed by the locally trained American import Long River. Betting is illegal in Dubai, but British bookmakers made California Chrome the 5/4 favourite ahead of Lea (4/1) and Epiphaneia (13/2). African Story and Hokku Tarumae were next in the market on 8/1 ahead of the 14/1 shot Prince Bishop.

== The race ==
Hokko Tarumae broke quickly and set the pace in the early stages from African Story, California Chrome (racing four wide) and Long River with Prince Bishop detached from the rest of the field in last place. The Japanese horse maintained his advantage on the back straight and approached the final turn with the lead from California Chrome, African Story and Lea as Prince Bishop made rapid progress on the outside. By this point Long River, Side Glance and Epiphaneia were beaten, whilst Candy Boy was staying on but well behind the leading five. Entering the straight, California Chrome moved up to challenge Hokko Tarumae, but both horses were overtaken by Prince Bishop who quickly went into a clear lead. In the final stages Hokko Tarumae and African Story faded whilst Lea and Candy Boy made steady progress. Prince Bishop extended his advantage to win by two and three quarter lengths from California Chrome, with Lea one and quarter lengths back in third. There was a five length gap back to Candy Boy, who took fourth by a short head from Hokko Tarumae, with another four lengths back to African Story. Long River, Side Glance and Epiphaneia finished seventh, eighth and ninth at long intervals.

== Race details ==
- Sponsor: Emirates
- Purse: £6,410,256; First prize: £3,846,153.
- Surface: Dirt
- Going: Fast
- Distance: 10 furlongs
- Number of runners: 9
- Winner's time: 2:03.24

== Full result ==
Pos.	Marg.	Horse (bred)	Age	Jockey	Trainer (Country)	Odds
1		Prince Bishop (IRE)	8	William Buick	Saeed bin Suroor (GB/UAE)	14/1
2	2¾	California Chrome (USA)	4	Victor Espinoza	Art Sherman (USA)	5/4 fav
3	1¼	Lea (USA)	6	Joel Rosario	Bill Mott (USA)	4/1
4	5¼	Candy Boy (USA)	4	Pat Dobbs	Doug Watson (UAE)	25/1
5	shd	Hokko Tarumae (JPN)	6	Hideaki Miyuki	Katsuichi Nishiura (JPN)	8/1
6	4	African Story (GB)	8	James Doyle	Saeed bin Suroor (GB/UAE)	8/1
7	14½	Long River (USA)	5	Mickael Barzalona	S bin Ghadayer (UAE)	66/1
8	8½	Side Glance (GB)	8	Andrea Atzeni	Andrew Balding (GB)	33/1
9	7	Epiphaneia (JPN)	5	Christophe Soumillon	Katsuhiko Sumii (JPN)	13/2

- Abbreviations: nse = nose; nk = neck; shd = head; hd = head

== Winner's details ==
Further details of the winner, Prince Bishop

- Sex: Gelding
- Foaled: 10 February 2007
- Country: Ireland
- Sire: Dubawi; Dam: North East Bay (Prospect Bay)
- Owner: Hamdan bin Mohammed Al Maktoum
- Breeder: Thurso Ltd
