= Moon Ballad =

Irish-bred Thoroughbred racehorse

- Sire: Singspiel
- Grandsire: In The Wings
- Dam: Velvet Moon
- Damsire: Shaadi
- Sex: Stallion
- Foaled: 1999
- Country: Ireland
- Colour: Chestnut
- Breeder: Newgate Stud Farm
- Owner: Godolphin Racing
- Trainer: Saeed bin Suroor
- Record: 14: 5-3-1
- Earnings: US$4,377,008 (equivalent)

Major wins
- Dante Stakes (2002); Select Stakes (2002); Sheikh Maktoum Challenge Round II (2003); Dubai World Cup (2003)

Moon Ballad (foaled 1999 in Ireland) is a Thoroughbred racehorse who competed internationally.

== Background ==
He was bred by Prince Fahd Salman's Newgate Stud Farm which operated from a base at the now closed Sandley Stud in Gillingham, Dorset in England.

Out of the mare Velvet Moon, Moon Ballad's damsire was Shaadi who in 1989 won the Group One Irish 2,000 Guineas. Moon Ballad's sire was the international winner Singspiel who won G-1 events in England, Canada, Japan, and the Dubai World Cup. Singspiel was a son of In The Wings who was a multiple Group One winner in Europe as well victor in the 1990 Breeders' Cup Turf in the United States.

Sold in October 2000 at the Tattersalls auction to Godolphin Racing, Moon Ballad was conditioned for racing by Saeed bin Suroor.

== Racing career ==
=== 2001: Two-year-old season ===
The colt raced once at age two, finishing second in a 2001 maiden stakes at Newmarket Racecourse in England.

=== 2002: Three-year-old season ===
In 2002, Moon Ballad began the year racing at Nad Al Sheba Racecourse in his owner's native Dubai. He won his first outing then finished fourth to Essence of Dubai in the 2002 UAE Derby. Back in England his race-riding duties were taken over by jockey Jamie Spencer. In May they ran second in a Listed stakes race at Newmarket then won the G-2 Dante Stakes at York Racecourse before finishing third to High Chaparral in June's Epsom Derby. In September, Moon Ballad won the G-3 Select Stakes and in October ran second in the G-1 Champion Stakes.

=== 2003: Four-year-old season ===
In February 2003, Frankie Dettori rode the four-year-old to victory in the Al Maktoum Challenge, Round 2 at Nad Al Sheba Racecourse in his owner's native Dubai. Six weeks later at the same racecourse, Dettori and Moon Ballad won the world's richest horse race, capturing the US$6 million Dubai World Cup by 5 lengths. Returning to England, at Ascot Racecourse he ran ninth in the Prince of Wales's Stakes and was fifth in the Sussex Stakes at Goodwood Racecourse. Racing in the early fall at Leopardstown Racecourse in Ireland, the colt ran fifth to High Chaparral in the Irish Champion Stakes. He was then sent to the United States to compete in the Jockey Club Gold Cup at New York's Belmont Park. Under U.S. Racing Hall of Fame jockey Jerry Bailey, Moon Ballad finished fifth and last to winner Mineshaft.

== Stud career ==
Retired after his loss in New York, Moon Ballad was sent to stand at stud under Darley Stud's management at the Yoshun Company's Stud in Hokkaidō, Japan. In 2010, he was returned to Ireland to stand at the Woodlands Stud, Galway.
