= 2002 Dubai World Cup =

7th Dubai World Cup
- Dubai World Cup
- Location: Nad Al Sheba
- Date: 23 March 2002
- Winning horse: Street Cry (IRE)
- Jockey: Jerry Bailey
- Trainer: Saeed bin Suroor (GB/UAE)
- Owner: Godolphin

The 2002 Dubai World Cup was a horse race held at Nad Al Sheba Racecourse on Saturday 23 March 2002. It was the 7th running of the Dubai World Cup.

The winner was Godolphin's Street Cry, a four-year-old bay or brown colt trained in Dubai by Saeed bin Suroor and ridden by Jerry Bailey. Street Cry's victory was a record fourth in the race for Bailey, the third for bin Suroor and the second for Godolphin.

Street Cry was originally trained in the United States by Eoin Harty and finished third the Breeders' Cup Juvenile before being transferred to Saeed bin Suroor's stable in 2001. As a three-year-old he ran only three times, and recorded a win in the UAE 2000 Guineas. In the following year he was prepared for the World Cup by winning the second round of the Al Maktoum Challenge in February. In the 2002 Dubai World Cup he started the 9/2 second favourite and won by four and a quarter lengths from the Argentinian-bred outsider Sei Mei with the 2/5 favourite Sakhee four and a quarter lengths away in third place.

== Race details ==
- Sponsor: none
- Purse: £4,109,589; First prize: £2,465,753
- Surface: Dirt
- Going: Fast
- Distance: 10 furlongs
- Number of runners: 11
- Winner's time: 2:01.18

== Full result ==
| Pos. | Marg. | Horse (bred) | Age | Jockey | Trainer (Country) | Odds |
|---|---|---|---|---|---|---|
| 1 | | Street Cry (IRE) | 4 | Jerry Bailey | Saeed bin Suroor (GB/UAE) | 9/2 |
| 2 | 4¼ | Sei Mi (ARG) | 6 | J. A. Velez | Jerry Barton (KSA) | 66/1 |
| 3 | 4¼ | Sakhee (USA) | 5 | Frankie Dettori | Saeed bin Suroor (GB/UAE) | 2/5 fav |
| 4 | 2¼ | Crimson Quest (IRE) | 5 | E. Coa | Jerry Barton (KSA) | 50/1 |
| 5 | nk | Royal Tryst (USA) | 5 | Craig Williams | John D. Sadler (UAE) | 100/1 |
| 6 | 5¼ | Agnes Digital (USA) | 5 | Hirofumi Shii | Toshiaki Shirai (JPN) | 5/1 |
| 7 | ½ | Best of the Bests (IRE) | 5 | Jamie Spencer | Saeed bin Suroor (GB/UAE) | 20/1 |
| 8 | nk | Keltos (FR) | 4 | Gerald Mosse | Carlos Laffon-Parias (FR) | 66/1 |
| 9 | 4¼ | Western Pride (USA) | 4 | Pat Valenzuela | Jim Chapman (USA) | 20/1 |
| 10 | 9½ | State Shinto (USA) | 6 | Ted Durcan | Saeed bin Suroor (GB/UAE) | 66/1 |
| 11 | 2¼ | To The Victory (JPN) | 6 | Olivier Peslier | Yasuo Ikee (JPN) | 25/1 |

- Abbreviations: DSQ = disqualified; nse = nose; nk = neck; shd = head; hd = head; nk = neck

== Winner's details ==
Further details of the winner, Street Cry

- Sex: Stallion
- Foaled: 11 March 1998
- Country: Ireland
- Sire: Machiavellian; Dam: Helen Street (Troy)
- Owner: Godolphin
- Breeder: Sheikh Mohammed
