= 2006 Dubai World Cup =

11th Dubai World Cup
- Dubai World Cup
- Location: Nad Al Sheba
- Date: 25 March 2006
- Winning horse: Electrocutionist (USA)
- Jockey: Frankie Dettori
- Trainer: Saeed bin Suroor (GB/UAE)
- Owner: Godolphin

The 2006 Dubai World Cup was a horse race held at Nad Al Sheba Racecourse on Saturday 25 March 2006. It was the 11th running of the Dubai World Cup.

The winner was Godolphin's American-bred Electrocutionist, a five-year-old bay horse trained in the Dubai by Saeed bin Suroor and ridden by Frankie Dettori. Electrocutionist's victory was the third in the race for Dettori, the fifth in the race for bin Suroor and the fourth for Godolphin.

Originally trained in Italy, Electroctionist won the Gran Premio di Milano and the International Stakes before being sold to Godolphin and transferred to the stable of Saeed bin Suroor. On his debut for his new connections he raced for the first time on dirt and won the third round of the Al Maktoum Challenge. In the 2006 Dubai World Cup he started the 5/4 favourite and won by one and a half lengths from the American-trained Brass Hat, with Wilko three lengths back in third. The Japanese-trained second favourite Kane Hekili finished fifth of the eleven runners. The runner-up Brass Hat was subsequently disqualified after failing a post-race dope test.

== Race details ==
- Sponsor: Emirates
- Purse: £3,488,372; First prize: £2,093,023
- Surface: Dirt
- Going: Fast
- Distance: 10 furlongs
- Number of runners: 11
- Winner's time: 2:01.32

== Full result ==
Pos.	Marg.	Horse (bred)	Age	Jockey	Trainer (Country)	Odds
1		Electrocutionist (USA)	5	Frankie Dettori	Saeed bin Suroor (GB/UAE)	5/4 fav
DSQ	1½	Brass Hat (USA)	5	Willie Martinez	William Bradley (USA)	11/2
2	3	Wilko (USA)	4	Garrett Gomez	Jeremy Noseda (GB)	33/1
3	2¾	Magna Graduate (USA)	4	John R. Velazquez	Todd Pletcher (USA)	12/1
4	2¾	Kane Hekili (JPN)	4	Yutaka Take	Katsuhiko Sumii (JPN)	7/2
5	1½	Chiquitin (ARG)	6	Mick Kinane	Ian Jory (KSA)	50/1
6	3½	Maraahel (IRE)	5	Richard Hills	Michael Stoute (GB)	9/1
7	nk	Star King Man (USA)	7	Olivier Peslier	Hideyuki Mori (JPN)	40/1
8	1¾	Super Frolic (USA)	6	Corey Nakatani	Vladimir Cerin (USA)	16/1
9	nk	Choctaw Nation (UA)	6	Victor Espinoza	Jeff Mullins (KSA)	16/1
10	4¾	Shakis (IRE)	6	Willie Supple	Doug Watson (UAE)	66/1

- Abbreviations: DSQ = disqualified; nse = nose; nk = neck; shd = head; hd = head; nk = neck

== Winner's details ==
Further details of the winner, Electrocutionist

- Sex: Stallion
- Foaled: 24 February 2001
- Country: United States
- Sire: Red Ransom; Dam: Elbaaha (Arazi)
- Owner: Godolphin
- Breeder: Compagnia Generale
