= 2001 Dubai World Cup =

6th Dubai World Cup
- Dubai World Cup
- Location: Nad Al Sheba
- Date: 24 March 2001
- Winning horse: Captain Steve (USA)
- Jockey: Jerry Bailey
- Trainer: Bob Baffert (USA)
- Owner: Michael E. Pegram

The 2001 Dubai World Cup was a horse race held at Nad Al Sheba Racecourse on Saturday 24 March 2001. It was the 6th running of the Dubai World Cup.

The winner was Michael E. Pegram's Captain Steve, a four-year-old chestnut colt trained in the United States by Bob Baffert and ridden by Jerry Bailey. Captain Steve's victory was a third in the race for Bailey, a second for Baffert and a first for Pegram.

Captain Steve was one of the leading colts of his generation in the United States, winning the Hollywood Futurity in 1999 and the Swaps Stakes in 2000. Before being shipped to Dubai he won the Donn Handicap at Gulfstream Park on 3 February. In the 2001 Dubai World Cup he started the 7/4 joint-favourite and won by three lengths from the Japanese challenger To The Victory with the French-trained Hightori half a length away in third place. The other joint-favourite was the Godolphin runner Best of the Bests, who finished eighth of the twelve runners.

== Race details ==
- Sponsor: none
- Purse: £4,000,000; First prize: £2,400,000
- Surface: Dirt
- Going: Fast
- Distance: 10 furlongs
- Number of runners: 12
- Winner's time: 2:00.40

== Full result ==
Pos.	Marg.	Horse (bred)	Age	Jockey	Trainer (Country)	Odds
1		Captain Steve (USA)	4	Jerry Bailey	Bob Baffert (USA)	7/4 jt fav
2	3	To The Victory (JPN)	5	Yutaka Take	Yasuo Ikee (JPN)	25/1
3	½	Hightori (FR)	4	Gerald Mosse	Philippe Demercastel (FR)	8/1
4	shd	State Shinto (USA)	5	Ted Durcan	John Sadler (UAE)	25/1
5	1½	Sei Mi (ARG)	5	Chris McCarron	Jerry Barton (KSA)	66/1
6	1	Aptitude (USA)	4	Gary Stevens	Robert J. Frankel (USA)	5/1
7	1¾	Ekraar (USA)	4	Richard Hills	Saeed bin Suroor (GB/UAE)	12/1
8	4	Best of the Bests (IRE)	4	Jamie Spencer	Saeed bin Suroor (GB/UAE)	7/4 jt fav
9	nse	Regular Member (JPN)	4	Mikio Matsunaga	S Yamamoto (JPN)	50/1
10	hd	Broche (USA)	4	David Flores	Saeed bin Suroor (GB/UAE)	22/1
11	6	Aristotle (IRE)	4	J. Saimee	M. Thwaites (SIN)	40/1
12	2	Early Warning (USA)	6	Sebastian Madrid	S Al Shaibani (KSA)	40/1

- Abbreviations: DSQ = disqualified; nse = nose; nk = neck; shd = head; hd = head; nk = neck

== Winner's details ==
Further details of the winner, Captain Steve

- Sex: Stallion
- Foaled: 11 March 1997
- Country: United States
- Sire: Fly So Free; Dam: Sparkling Delite (Vice Regent)
- Owner: Michael E. Pegram
- Breeder: Roger Laubach
