= 2014 Dubai World Cup =

19th Dubai World Cup
- Dubai World Cup
- Location: Meydan
- Date: 29 March 2014
- Winning horse: African Story (GB)
- Jockey: Silvestre de Sousa
- Trainer: Saeed bin Suroor (GB/UAE)
- Owner: Godolphin

The 2014 Dubai World Cup was a horse race held at Meydan Racecourse on Saturday 29 March 2014. It was the 19th running of the Dubai World Cup.

The winner was Godolphin's African Story, a seven-year-old chestnut gelding trained in Dubai by Saeed bin Suroor and ridden by Silvestre de Sousa. African Story's victory was the first in the race for his jockey, the sixth for his trainer and the fifth for his owners.

African Story had begun his racing career in France before being sent to race in Dubai and had won four of his eight races on the synthetic Tapeta surface at Meydan. He had also finished behind Animal Kingdom in the 2013 running of the Dubai World Cup. For the 2014 running of the race he started at odds of 12/1 and won by two and three quarter lengths from the British-trained Mukhadram with Cat O'Mountain (also running for Godolphin) four and a quarter lengths back in third. The 3/1 favourite Military Attack finished tenth of the sixteen runners.

== Race details ==
- Sponsor: Emirates
- Purse: £6,024,096; First prize: £3,614,457
- Surface: Tapeta
- Going: Standard
- Distance: 10 furlongs
- Number of runners: 16
- Winner's time: 2:01.61

== Full result ==
Pos.	Marg.	Horse (bred)	Age	Jockey	Trainer (Country)	Odds
1		African Story (GB)	7	Silvestre de Sousa	Saeed bin Suroor (GB/UAE)	12/1
2	2¾	Mukhadram (GB)	5	Paul Hanagan	William Haggas (GB)	14/1
3	4¼	Cat O'Mountain (USA)	4	Mickael Barzalona	Charlie Appleby (GB/UAE)	25/1
4	¾	Side Glance (GB)	7	Jamie Spencer	Andrew Balding (GB)	33/1
5	hd	Akeed Mofeed (GB)	5	Douglas Whyte	Richard Gibson (HK)	8/1
6	nse	Red Cadeaux (GB)	8	Gerald Mosse	Ed Dunlop (GB)	16/1
7	1¼	Sanshaawes (SAF)	5	Christophe Soumillon	Mike de Kock (SAF)	12/1
8	2¼	Vancouverite (GB)	4	William Buick	Charlie Appleby (GB/UAE)	16/1
9	nk	Prince Bishop (IRE)	7	Kieren Fallon	Saeed bin Suroor (GB/UAE)	8/1
10	1¼	Military Attack (IRE)	6	Joao Moreira	John Moore (HK)	3/1 fav
11	2	Belshazzar (JPN)	6	Christophe Lemaire	Kunihide Matsuda (JPN)	16/1
12	1½	Ron The Greek (USA)	6	Jose Lezcano	N. Bachalard (KSA)	25/1
13	hd	Ruler of the World (IRE)	4	Joseph O'Brien	Aidan O'Brien (IRE)	6/1
14	½	Hillstar (GB)	4	Ryan Moore	Michael Stoute (GB)	14/1
15	1½	Surfer (USA)	5	Richard Mullen	Satish Seemar (UAE)	40/1
16	2½	Hokko Tarumae (JPN)	5	Hideaki Miyuki	Katsuichi Nishiura (JPN)	16/1

- Abbreviations: nse = nose; nk = neck; shd = head; hd = head

== Winner's details ==
Further details of the winner, African Story

- Sex: Gelding
- Foaled: 10 March 2007
- Country: United Kingdom
- Sire: Pivotal; Dam: Blixen (Gone West)
- Owner: Godolphin
- Breeder: Darley Stud
