= 2022 Dubai World Cup =

Horse race

- Dubai World Cup
- Location: Meydan Racecourse; Dubai, United Arab Emirates
- Date: 26 March 2022
- Distance: 2,000 metres (about 10 furlongs)
- Winning horse: Country Grammer
- Winning time: 2:04.97
- Jockey: Frankie Dettori
- Trainer: Bob Baffert
- Owner: Zedan Racing Stables, WinStar Farm and Commonwealth Thoroughbreds
- Conditions: Fast
- Surface: Dirt

The 2022 Dubai World Cup was a horse race run at Meydan Racecourse in Dubai on 26 March 2022. It was the 26th running of the race. The total prize money for the race was $12 million, with the winner receiving $7.2 million.

The race was won by Country Grammer, trained by Bob Baffert and ridden by Frankie Dettori.

== Race ==
=== Entries ===
A field of 11 runners was declared for the race, including Breeders' Cup Dirt Mile and Pegasus World Cup winner Life Is Good. Other notable entries included Louisiana Derby and Pennsylvania Derby winner Hot Rod Charlie, and Country Grammer and Midnight Bourbon, who finished second and third respectively in the 2022 Saudi Cup.

Only 10 horses started the race, after Grocer Jack was declared a non-runner.

=== Result ===
Position	Margin	Horse	Jockey	Trainer	Prize
1		Country Grammer	Frankie Dettori	Bob Baffert	$7,200,000
2	1¾	Hot Rod Charlie	Flavien Prat	Doug O'Neill	$2,400,000
3	½	Chuwa Wizard	Yuga Kawada	Ryuji Okubo	$1,200,000
4	shd	Life Is Good	Irad Ortiz Jr.	Todd Pletcher	$600,000
5	1¼	Midnight Bourbon	José Ortiz	Steve Asmussen	$360,000
6	1¼	Remorse	Tadhg O'Shea	Bhupat Seemar	$240,000
7	8¼	Hypothetical	Mickael Barzalona	Salem bin Ghadayer	
8	nse	Aero Trem	Vagner Leal	Antonio Cintra	
9	8	Real World	Christophe Soumillon	Saeed bin Suroor	
10	9¼	Magny Cours	William Buick	André Fabre	
