= 2016 Dubai World Cup =

21st Dubai World Cup
- Dubai World Cup
- Location: Meydan
- Date: 26 March 2016
- Winning horse: California Chrome (USA)
- Jockey: Victor Espinoza
- Trainer: Art Sherman (USA)
- Owner: California Chrome LLC
- Surface: Dirt

The 2016 Dubai World Cup was a horse race held at Meydan Racecourse on Saturday 26 March 2016. It was the 21st running of the Dubai World Cup. It was the second running of the race since the synthetic Tapeta surface was replaced by a dirt track.

The winner was California Chrome LLC's California Chrome, a five-year-old chestnut horse trained in the United States by Art Sherman and ridden by Victor Espinoza. California Chrome's victory was the first in the race for his jockey, trainer and owner.

== The contenders ==
The race attracted a strong North American challenge headed by the 2014 American Horse of the Year California Chrome, who had finished second in the race in 2015. The other runners from the United States were Keen Ice, Frosted (Wood Memorial Stakes, Al Maktoum Challenge, Round 2, second in the Belmont Stakes), Mshawish (Gulfstream Park Turf Handicap, Donn Handicap) and Hoppertunity (Clark Handicap). The United Arab Emirates was represented by Mubtaahij (UAE Derby), Special Fighter (Al Maktoum Challenge, Round 3) and Candy Boy (fourth in the 2015 race). The Japanese dirt specialist Hokku Tarumae ran in the race for the third time, whilst the other three runners were Vadamos from France, Gun Pit from Hong Kong and Teletext from Saudi Arabia.

Betting is illegal in Dubai, but British bookmakers made California Chrome and Frosted the 15/8 joint favourites ahead of Mshawish (9/1), Special Fighter (10/1) and Keen Ice (12/1).

== The race ==
Frankie Dettori sent Mshawish into the lead from the start and set the pace, with California Chrome (on the outside), Mubtaahij (on the rail) and Special Fighter close behind. There was little change in the order until the final turn although Frosted made progress to join the leading group. California Chrome overtook the tiring Mshawish early in the straight and quickly opened up a clear advantage. Mubtaahij, Special Fighter and Frosted maintained their positions without being able to quicken and Hoppertunity made rapid progress from the rear of the field. California Chrome crossed the finish line three and three-quarter lengths clear of Mubtaahij who was a neck in front of Hoppertunity whilst Special Fighter took fourth place just ahead of Frosted, Mshawish and Candy Boy. Keen Ice finished eighth ahead of Hokko Tarumae, with the other three runners tailed off. Impressively, California Chrome won despite his saddle slipping badly in deep stretch, which compromised Espinoza's ability to safely control his mount.

== Race details ==
- Sponsor: Emirates
- Purse: £6,802,701; First prize: £4,081,633
- Surface: Dirt
- Going: Fast
- Distance: 10 furlongs
- Number of runners: 12
- Winner's time: 2:01.83

== Full result ==
Pos.	Marg.	Horse (bred)	Age	Jockey	Trainer (Country)	Odds
1		California Chrome (USA)	5	Victor Espinoza	Art Sherman (USA)	15/8 jfav
2	3¾	Mubtaahij (IRE)	4	Christophe Soumillon	Mike de Kock (UAE)	16/1
3	nk	Hoppertunity (USA)	5	Flavien Prat	Bob Baffert (USA)	25/1
4	1¼	Special Fighter (IRE)	5	Fernando Jara	Musabah Al Muhari (UAE)	10/1
5	nk	Frosted (USA)	4	William Buick	Kiaran McLaughlin (USA)	15/8 jfav
6	nk	Mshawish (USA)	6	Frankie Dettori	Todd Pletcher (USA)	9/1
7	hd	Candy Boy (USA)	5	Pat Dobbs	Doug Watson (UAE)	100/1
8	1	Keen Ice (USA)	4	Ryan Moore	Dale Romans (USA)	12/1
9	3½	Hokko Tarumae (JPN)	7	Hideaki Miyuki	Katsuichi Nishiura (JPN)	50/1
10	18	Teletext (USA)	5	Silvestre de Sousa	S Al Harabi (KSA)	50/1
11	7¾	Vadamos (FR)	5	Vincent Cheminaud	André Fabre (FR)	25/1
12	hd	Gun Pit (AUS)	5	João Moreira	Caspar Fownes (HK)	40/1

- Abbreviations: nse = nose; nk = neck; shd = head; hd = head

== Winner's details ==
Further details of the winner, California Chrome

- Sex: Stallion
- Foaled: 18 February 2011
- Country: United States
- Sire: Lucky Pulpit; Dam: Love The Chase (Not For Love)
- Owner: California Chrome LLC
- Breeder: Perry Martin & Steve Coburn
