= Action This Day (horse) =

American Thoroughbred racehorse

- Sire: Kris S.
- Grandsire: Roberto
- Dam: Najecam
- Damsire: Trempolino
- Sex: Stallion
- Foaled: 2001
- Country: United States
- Color: Bay
- Breeder: Lee Owens
- Owner: B. Wayne Hughes
- Trainer: Richard Mandella
- Record: 9: 2-1-0
- Earnings: $422,484

Major wins
- Breeders' Cup Juvenile (2003)

Awards
- United States Champion 2-Yr-Old Colt (2003)
- Last updated on August 10, 2021

Action This Day (foaled February 18, 2001 in Kentucky) is a retired American Thoroughbred racehorse.

== Racing career ==
In 2003, after winning his maiden race September 28 at Santa Anita Park, he became the first maiden to win the Breeders' Cup Juvenile. After running last for most of the race, he came from off the pace in the homestretch and won by two lengths over Minister Eric. He was voted the U.S. Eclipse Award for Outstanding 2-Year-Old Male Horse.

Action This Day made his 2004 debut on February 8 in the Sham Stakes, finishing fourth. He then ran seventh in the San Felipe Stakes and sixth in the Blue Grass Stakes. Entered into the 2004 Kentucky Derby, he managed a sixth-place finish in the field of 18.

== Breeding career ==
Retired after the 2004 racing season, Action This Day entered stud at Castleton Farm in Lexington, Kentucky. In 2010 he stood at Dana Point Farm at Lenhartsville, Pennsylvania and the following year at Indiana Stallion Station in Anderson, Indiana. In 2013 Action this Day was sold to Haras Los Azahares to stand in Peru.
