= 2024 Dubai World Cup =

Horse race

- Dubai World Cup
- Location: Meydan Racecourse; Dubai, United Arab Emirates
- Date: 30 March 2024
- Distance: 2,000 metres (about 10 furlongs)
- Winning horse: Laurel River
- Jockey: Tadhg O'Shea
- Trainer: Bhupat Seemar
- Surface: Dirt

The 2024 Dubai World Cup was a horse race run at Meydan Racecourse in Dubai on 30 March 2024. It was the 28th running of the race. The total prize money for the race was $12 million, with the winner receiving $7.2 million.

== Result ==
Position	Margin	Horse	Jockey	Trainer	Prize
1		Laurel River	Tadhg O'Shea	Bhupat Seemar	
2	8½	Ushba Tesoro	Yuga Kawada	Noboru Takagi	
3	nk	Senor Buscador	Junior Alvarado	Todd Fincher	
4	4¾	Wilson Tesoro	Yusuke Hara	Hitoshi Kotegawa	
5	shd	Dura Erede	Bauyrzhan Murzabayev	Manabu Ikezoe	
6	2½	Derma Sotogake	Oisin Murphy	Hidetaka Otonashi	
7	shd	Defunded	Adel Al Furaydi	Abdulaziz K Mishref	
8	1¾	Kabirkhan	Pat Dobbs	Doug Watson	
9	½	Newgate	Frankie Dettori	Bob Baffert	
10	¾	Crupi	Luis Saez	Todd Pletcher	
11	hd	Clapton	Dylan Davis	Chad Summers	
12	67	Military Law	Oscar Chavez	M Al Mheiri	
