= 2021 Dubai World Cup =

Horse race

- Dubai World Cup
- Location: Meydan Racecourse; Dubai, United Arab Emirates
- Date: 27 March 2021
- Distance: 2,000 metres (about 10 furlongs)
- Winning horse: Mystic Guide
- Winning time: 2:01.61
- Jockey: Luis Saez
- Trainer: Michael Stidham
- Owner: Godolphin
- Conditions: Fast
- Surface: Dirt

The 2021 Dubai World Cup was a horse race run at Meydan Racecourse in Dubai on 27 March 2021. It was the 25th running of the race after the planned 2020 event was cancelled due to the COVID-19 pandemic. The total prize money for the race was $12 million, with the winner receiving $7.2 million.

The race was won by Mystic Guide, trained in the United States by Michael Stidham, and ridden by Luis Saez.

== Race ==
=== Full result ===
Position	Margin	Horse	Jockey	Trainer	Prize
1		Mystic Guide	Luis Saez	Michael Stidham	$7,200,000
2	3¾	Chuwa Wizard	Keita Tosaki	Ryuji Okubo	$2,400,000
3	1¼	Magny Cours	William Buick	André Fabre	$1,200,000
4	1¼	Hypothetical	Mickael Barzalona	Salem bin Ghadayer	$600,000
5	1	Salute The Soldier	Adrie de Vries	Fawzi Abdulla Nass	$360,000
6	1	Jesus' Team	Joel Rosario	José Francisco D'Angelo	$240,000
7	4¼	Thegreatcollection	Pat Cosgrave	Doug Watson	
8	½	Ajuste Fiscal	Vagner Leal	Antonio Cintra Pereira	
9	3¾	Gifts Of Gold	Christophe Soumillon	Saeed bin Suroor	
10	5¼	Sleepy Eyes Todd	Alexis Moreno	Miguel Ángel Silva	
11	12	Title Ready	Ryan Moore	Dallas Stewart	
12	33	Capezzano	Royston Ffrench	Salem bin Ghadayer	

Non-runners: Great Scot, Military Law (both withdrawn after getting loose before start)
