= Malek (horse) =

Chilean-bred Thoroughbred racehorse

- Sire: Mocito Guapo
- Grandsire: Good Manners
- Dam: Condegnito
- Damsire: Chairman Walker
- Sex: Stallion
- Foaled: 14 September 1993
- Country: Chile
- Colour: Bay
- Breeder: Haras Mocito Guapo
- Owner: Stud Panter; Great Falls SA
- Trainer: Alfredo Bagú; Richard Mandella
- Record: 23: 10-7-2
- Earnings: $2,382,623

Major wins
- Gran Criterium (1996); Tanteo de Potrillos (1996); Santa Anita Handicap (1998)

Malek was a Chilean-bred racehorse. He raced with considerable success in South America before being exported to the United States where he recorded his biggest win in the 1998 Santa Anita Handicap.

== Background ==
Malek was a bay horse with a stripe bred in Chile by the Haras Mocito Guapo. He was sired by the Argentinian stallion Mocito Guapo, a grandson of the American champion Nashua, out of the locally bred mare Condegnita. Malek was bred on the same Mocito Guapo–Chairman Walker cross as the undefeated mare Moscona.

== Racing career ==
Malek debuted on March 18, 1996, in a 1200-meter race at Club Hípico de Santiago, in which he finished fourth. Malek broke his maiden in May at Hipódromo Chile, and later that month won the Group Three Clásico Victor Matetic Fernandez. In June, in his last race as a two-year-old, Malek won the Group One Tanteo de Potrillos by about three-quarters of a length.

Malek next ran in and won the Group Two Clásico Domingo 2 Herrera Martínez. Malek finished third in the Group One Dos Mil Guineas to Tango Uno, then ran down Tango Uno to win the Group One Gran Criterium. Malek won the listed Clásico Guillermo del Pedregal H. before finishing second to Golden Tribute in the Clásico St. Leger. Facing older horses for the first time, Malek finished second in the listed Clásico Julio Prado Amor before winning the ungraded Clásico Alberto Vial L. In his final race in Chile, Malek finished second by two lengths to Gran Ducato in the Group One Gran Premio Hipodromo Chile.

In 1997 Malek was sent to race in the United States where he was trained by Richard Mandella. He was ridden in most of his American races by Alex Solis. In his first race in the United States, Malek won an allowance race at Hollywood Park before finishing second in the Grade Two San Pasqual Handicap on January 10, 1998. In March 1998 he won the Santa Anita Handicap and finished fourth to Silver Charm in the Dubai World Cup. Malek didn't race again until the following year, where he again finished second in the San Pasqual Handicap as well as the San Antonio Handicap before returning to Dubai.

Malek finished second to Almutawakel in the 1999 Dubai World Cup and ran third behind Real Quiet in the Hollywood Gold Cup. He then won the ungraded Viking Spirit Handicap at Del Mar before running fifth in the Pacific Classic. Malek's last race was in 2000 in the Santa Anita Handicap, where he finished fourth.

== Stud record ==
Malek was retired and stood as a breeding stallion in Chile before moving to California in 2001. He returned to Chile in 2006.

== Pedigree ==
Pedigree of Malek (CHI), brown stallion, 1993
Sire Mocito Guapo (ARG) 1972	Good Manners (USA); 1966	Nashua	Nasrullah
Sire Mocito Guapo (ARG) 1972	Good Manners (USA); 1966	Nashua	Segula
Sire Mocito Guapo (ARG) 1972	Good Manners (USA); 1966	Fun House	The Doge
Sire Mocito Guapo (ARG) 1972	Good Manners (USA); 1966	Fun House	Recess
Sire Mocito Guapo (ARG) 1972	La Chiflada (ARG); 1963	Right of Way	Honeyway
Sire Mocito Guapo (ARG) 1972	La Chiflada (ARG); 1963	Right of Way	Magnificent
Sire Mocito Guapo (ARG) 1972	La Chiflada (ARG); 1963	La Maleva	Cardanil
Sire Mocito Guapo (ARG) 1972	La Chiflada (ARG); 1963	La Maleva	Margot
Dam Condegnita (CHI) 1985	Chairman Walker (USA); 1969	Buckpasser	Tom Fool
Dam Condegnita (CHI) 1985	Chairman Walker (USA); 1969	Buckpasser	Busanda
Dam Condegnita (CHI) 1985	Chairman Walker (USA); 1969	Swansea	Turn-To
Dam Condegnita (CHI) 1985	Chairman Walker (USA); 1969	Swansea	Somethingroyal
Dam Condegnita (CHI) 1985	Dilecta (CHI); 1977	Decano	Sheet Anchor
Dam Condegnita (CHI) 1985	Dilecta (CHI); 1977	Decano	Pochula
Dam Condegnita (CHI) 1985	Dilecta (CHI); 1977	Line Out	Alcide
Dam Condegnita (CHI) 1985	Dilecta (CHI); 1977	Line Out	Blue Line (Family:8-h)
