= In the Wings (horse) =

British-bred Thoroughbred racehorse

In The Wings
- Sire: Sadler's Wells
- Grandsire: Northern Dancer
- Dam: High Hawk
- Damsire: Shirley Heights
- Sex: Stallion
- Foaled: 1986
- Country: Great Britain
- Colour: Bay
- Breeder: Sheikh Mohammed
- Owner: Sheikh Mohammed
- Trainer: André Fabre
- Record: 11: 7-1-0
- Earnings: £968,660

Major wins
- Prix de Vineuil (1988); Prix du Haras de la Huderie (1988); Prix du Prince d'Orange (1989); Coronation Cup (1990); Grand Prix de Saint-Cloud (1990); Prix Foy (1990) Breeders' Cup wins: Breeders' Cup Turf (1990)

In The Wings (1986–2004) was a Thoroughbred racehorse who raced from a base in France. He was bred and raced by Sheikh Mohammed, and trained in France by André Fabre,

== Racing career ==
On June 17, 1988 at Chantilly Racecourse, In The Wings made a winning debut in the 1988 Prix de Vineuil under jockey Cash Asmussen. Rider and horse next won August's Prix du Haras de la Huderie at Deauville-La Touques Racecourse. The colt did not race again until September 1989 but the then three-year-old picked up where he left off, winning the Prix du Prince d'Orange at Longchamp Racecourse in Paris. In his next start, In The Wings suffered his first defeat, finishing eleventh in the Prix de l'Arc de Triomphe against some of the best older horses in Europe.

In The Wings returned to race in France as a four-year-old in 1990. On April 29, he finished second in the Prix Ganay at Longchamp before winning June's Group One Coronation Cup at England's Epsom Downs Racecourse. He then returned to France where he won the G1 Grand Prix de Saint-Cloud. After finishing fifth in the King George VI and Queen Elizabeth Stakes at Ascot Racecourse, In The Wings won the September Prix Foy at Longchamp. In his second Prix de l'Arc de Triomphe, he finished fourth but then won the richest race of his career at Belmont Park in Elmont, New York on October 27, 1990. Ridden by future U.S. Racing Hall of Fame jockey Gary Stevens, In The Wings won the US$2 million Breeders' Cup Turf, defeating such notable runners as With Approval (2nd), Saumarez, (5th), Pleasant Tap (8th), and Sky Classic (11th).

== Stud record ==
Following his win in the Breeders' Cup, In The Wings was retired to stand stud at Kildangan Stud in Ireland. A successful sire, among his notable offspring were:

- Singspiel (b. 1992) - International superstar runner who won the Canadian International Stakes (1996), Japan Cup (1996), Dubai World Cup (1997), Coronation Cup (1997), International Stakes (1997)
- Winged Love (b. 1992) - won Irish Derby Stakes
- Central Park (b. 1995) - won Derby Italiano (1998), Premio Presidente della Repubblica (1999)
- Mamool (b. 1999) - won 2003 Grosser Bugatti Preis & Preis von Europa (career earnings of £742,317
- Inglis Drever (b. 1999) - won Long Distance Hurdle (2005, 2006, 2007), World Hurdle (2005, 2007, 2008), named 2007 ROA/Racing Post Outstanding Hurdler, 2007-2008 Anglo-Irish Jumps Champion
- Soldier Hollow (b. 2000) - 2004 German Horse of the Year, career earnings of £836,728

Suffering from laminitis, at age eighteen In The Wings was humanely euthanized on 3 April 2004.

== Pedigree ==
Pedigree of In The Wings
Sire Sadler's Wells	Northern Dancer	Nearctic	Nearco
Sire Sadler's Wells	Northern Dancer	Nearctic	Lady Angela
Sire Sadler's Wells	Northern Dancer	Natalma	Native Dancer
Sire Sadler's Wells	Northern Dancer	Natalma	Almahmoud
Sire Sadler's Wells	Fairy Bridge	Bold Reason	Hail To Reason
Sire Sadler's Wells	Fairy Bridge	Bold Reason	Lalun
Sire Sadler's Wells	Fairy Bridge	Special	Forli
Sire Sadler's Wells	Fairy Bridge	Special	Thong
Dam High Hawk	Shirley Heights	Mill Reef	Never Bend
Dam High Hawk	Shirley Heights	Mill Reef	Milan Mill
Dam High Hawk	Shirley Heights	Hardiemma	Hardicanute
Dam High Hawk	Shirley Heights	Hardiemma	Grand Cross
Dam High Hawk	Sunbittern	Sea Hawk	Herbager
Dam High Hawk	Sunbittern	Sea Hawk	Sea Nymph
Dam High Hawk	Sunbittern	Pantoufle	Panaslipper
Dam High Hawk	Sunbittern	Pantoufle	Etoile de France
