= Select Stakes (Great Britain) =

British group 3 flat horse race

- Class: Group 3
- Location: Goodwood Racecourse; W. Sussex, England
- Inaugurated: 1965
- Final run: 10 September 2011
- Race type: Flat / Thoroughbred
- Website: Goodwood

Race information
- Distance: 1m 1f 192y (1,986 m)
- Surface: Turf
- Track: Right-handed
- Qualification: Three-years-old and up
- Weight: 8 st 7 lb (3yo); 9 st 0 lb (4yo+); Allowances; 3 lb for fillies and mares Penalties; 7 lb for Group 1 winners * 5 lb for Group 2 winners * 3 lb for Group 3 winners * * since February 28
- Purse: £50,000 (2011); 1st: £28,355

The Select Stakes was a Group 3 flat horse race in Great Britain open to horses aged three years or older. It was run at Goodwood over a distance of 1 mile, 1 furlong and 192 yards (1,986 metres), and it was scheduled to take place each year in September.

== History ==
The event was established in 1965, and it was originally called the Valdoe Stakes. It was initially open to horses aged four or older, and the inaugural running was contested over a mile. The following year's edition was run as a handicap.

The race was restricted to three and four-year-olds in 1973, and it was re-opened to older horses in 1976. It was renamed the Select Stakes and promoted from Listed to Group 3 status in 1986. It was discontinued in 2012.

== Records ==
Most successful horse (2 wins):

- Knifebox – 1992, 1993

Leading jockey (4 wins):

- Michael Roberts – Mtoto (1988), Filia Ardross (1991), Knifebox (1993), Mutamam (1998)

Leading trainer (3 wins):

- Dick Hern – Bolide (1979), Prince Bee (1981), Morcon (1983)
- Alec Stewart – Mtoto (1988), Filia Ardross (1991), Mutamam (1998)
- Saeed bin Suroor – Triarius (1995), Moon Ballad (2002), Pictavia (2006)
- Marcus Tregoning – Ekraar (2000), Nayef (2001), Alkaadhem (2004)

== Winners ==
Year	Winner	Age	Jockey	Trainer	Time
1965	Derring-Do	4	Scobie Breasley	Arthur Budgett	1:51.40
1966	Antiquarian	5	Ron Hutchinson	Herbert Blagrave	2:14.40
1967	Haymaking	4	Lester Piggott	Fulke Johnson Houghton	2:11.00
1968	Abandoned due to local flooding in surrounding area
1969	Jimmy Reppin	4	Geoff Lewis	John Sutcliffe, Jr.	2:09.60
1970	Northern Wizard	4	Geoff Lewis	Bill Marshall	2:20.70
1971	Ortis	4	Duncan Keith	Peter Walwyn	2:07.54
1972	Wenceslas	4	Lester Piggott	Vincent O'Brien	2:14.30
1973	So Royal	3	Des Cullen	Derrick Candy	2:09.20
1974	Abandoned due to waterlogging
1975	Escapologist	3	Ernie Johnson	Arthur Budgett	2:14.40
1976	Obstacle	3	Philip Waldron	Henry Candy	2:08.41
1977	Balmerino	5	Ron Hutchinson	John Dunlop	2:11.19
1978	Gunner B	5	Joe Mercer	Henry Cecil	2:07.40
1979 ^{[a]}	Bolide	3	Willie Carson	Dick Hern	2:04.20
1980	Welsh Chanter	4	Joe Mercer	Henry Cecil	2:13.66
1981	Prince Bee	4	Joe Mercer	Dick Hern	2:10.41
1982	Peacetime	3	Pat Eddery	Jeremy Tree	2:12.66
1983	Morcon	3	Willie Carson	Dick Hern	2:12.27
1984	Bob Back	3	Bruce Raymond	Michael Jarvis	2:09.64
1985	Iroko	3	Brian Rouse	Michael Stoute	2:05.74
1986	Dancing Brave	3	Greville Starkey	Guy Harwood	2:04.81
1987	Most Welcome	3	Paul Eddery	Geoff Wragg	2:11.28
1988	Mtoto	5	Michael Roberts	Alec Stewart	2:06.12
1989	Legal Case	3	Frankie Dettori	Luca Cumani	2:12.54
1990	Missionary Ridge	3	Ray Cochrane	Barry Hills	2:07.19
1991	Filia Ardross	5	Michael Roberts	Alec Stewart	2:10.16
1992	Knifebox	4	Darryll Holland	John Gosden	2:12.54
1993	Knifebox	5	Michael Roberts	John Gosden	2:11.88
1994	Alderbrook	5	Paul Eddery	Julie Cecil	2:13.40
1995	Triarius	5	Gary Carter	Saeed bin Suroor	2:10.07
1996	Singspiel	4	Cash Asmussen	Michael Stoute	2:07.38
1997	Fahris	3	Ray Cochrane	Ben Hanbury	2:10.38
1998	Mutamam	3	Michael Roberts	Alec Stewart	2:08.71
1999	Lear Spear	4	Richard Quinn	David Elsworth	2:05.12
2000	Ekraar	3	Richard Hills	Marcus Tregoning	2:07.08
2001	Nayef	3	Richard Hills	Marcus Tregoning	2:06.33
2002	Moon Ballad	3	Jamie Spencer	Saeed bin Suroor	2:03.44
2003	Leporello	3	Ian Mongan	Peter Harris	2:05.91
2004	Alkaadhem	4	Willie Supple	Marcus Tregoning	2:06.54
2005	David Junior	3	Jamie Spencer	Brian Meehan	2:08.84
2006	Pictavia	4	Frankie Dettori	Saeed bin Suroor	2:04.03
2007	Stotsfold	4	Adam Kirby	Walter Swinburn	2:06.56
2008	Lady Gloria	4	Tom Queally	James Given	2:11.18
2009	Mac Love	8	Micky Fenton	Stef Liddiard	2:06.81
2010	Red Badge	3	Richard Hughes	Richard Hannon Sr.	2:11.14
2011	French Navy	3	Ahmed Ajtebi	Mahmood Al Zarooni	2:08.15

^{a} The 1979 running took place at Sandown Park.

== See also ==
- Horse racing in Great Britain
- List of British flat horse races
- Recurring sporting events established in 1965 – this race is included under its original title, Valdoe Stakes.
