= Prince Bishop (horse) =

Irish-bred Thoroughbred racehorse

- Sire: Dubawi
- Grandsire: Dubai Millennium
- Dam: North East Bay
- Damsire: Prospect Bay
- Sex: Gelding
- Foaled: 10 February 2007
- Country: Ireland
- Colour: Chestnut
- Breeder: Thurso Ltd
- Owner: Sheikh Mohammed; Godolphin Racing; Hamdan bin Mohammed Al Maktoum
- Trainer: André Fabre; Saeed bin Suroor
- Record: 28:11-3-3
- Earnings: $7,061,632

Major wins
- Prix du Prince d'Orange (2010); Prix du Conseil de Paris (2010); Floodlit Stakes (2011); September Stakes (2013, 2014); Al Maktoum Challenge, Round 2 (2014); Al Maktoum Challenge, Round 3 (2014); Dubai World Cup (2015)

Prince Bishop (foaled 10 February 2007) is an Irish-bred Thoroughbred racehorse. He began his racing career in France as a three-year-old where he won the Prix du Prince d'Orange and the Prix du Conseil de Paris in 2010. He was later transferred to Dubai where he was based at Meydan Racecourse. He made occasional returns to compete in Europe and won the September Stakes in both 2013 and 2014. In March 2015 he won the world's most valuable race, the Dubai World Cup.

== Background ==
Prince Bishop is a chestnut gelding bred in Ireland by Thurso Ltd. He was sired by Dubawi, a top-class son of Dubai Millennium, whose wins included the Irish 2,000 Guineas and the Prix Jacques Le Marois. At stud, Dubawi has been a highly-successful breeding stallion, siring major winners such as Monterosso, Al Kazeem, Makfi, Lucky Nine and Night of Thunder. Prince Bishop's dam North East Bay was a North American-bred mare who finished unplaced in her only race. North East Bay was descended from Topsy, a half-sister to The Derby winner Teenoso and a close relative of Sir Percy, Harayir and Rule of Law.

As a foal, Prince Bishop was consigned to the Tattersalls sale in November, where he was bought for 80,000 guineas by Meadowlands Bloodstock. He entered the ownership of Sheikh Mohammed and was sent into training in France with André Fabre.

== Racing career ==
=== 2010: three-year-old season ===
Prince Bishop made his racecourse debut at Chantilly Racecourse on 3 May 2010 when he finished third in a maiden race over 1600 metres. He finished unplaced in his next two starts before recording his first success over 2000 metres at Vichy Racecourse, winning by ten lengths on heavy ground. After winning at odds of 3/5 at Deauville-Clairefontaine Racecourse in August Prince Bishop was moved up in class to contest the Group Three Prix du Prince d'Orange at Longchamp Racecourse on 18 September. Ridden as in all of his previous races by Maxime Guyon, he appeared outpaced in the early stages but produced a strong late run to win a four-way photo finish from Wealthy, Rajamah and Lancelot. Commenting on the winner, Guyon said: "He's a very progressive colt and the soft ground suited him". Olivier Peslier took over the ride when Prince Bishop was matched against older horses for the first time in the Prix du Conseil de Paris at Longchamp on 17 October. He raced in fifth before taking the lead 200 metres from the finish and holding off the challenge of the favourite Cirrus des Aigles to win by a short neck.

=== 2011: four-year-old season ===
In early 2011, Prince Bishop was transferred to Sheikh Mohammed's Godolphin in Dubai where he was trained by Saeed bin Suroor. He made little impact on the Tapeta surface at Meydan Racecourse, finishing fifth in the third round of the Al Maktoum Challenge and tenth behind Victoire Pisa in the 2011 Dubai World Cup. Later that year he returned to Europe and finished unplaced in the Winter Hill Stakes at Windsor Racecourse and the Stand Cup at Chester. On his final appearance of the season he was dropped in class and started at odds of 6/1 for the Listed Floodlit Stakes on the Polytrack surface at Kempton on 2 November. Ridden by Silvestre De Sousa he took the lead two furlongs from the finish, went clear of the field and won by three and three quarter lengths from Parlour Games.

=== 2012: five-year-old season ===
In 2012, Prince Bishop was campaigned exclusively at Meydan, and recorded his first win at the track when carrying top weight of 132 pounds to a five and a quarter length victory in a handicap race on 20 January. He finished fifth in the second round of the Al Maktoum Challenge and third in the third round of the series before running for the second time in the Dubai World Cup. Starting a 33/1 outsider he finished seventh of the thirteen runners, seven and a half lengths behind his stablemate Monterosso.

=== 2013: six-year-old season ===
As a six-year-old, Prince Bishop finished third to his stablemate Hunter's Light in the second and third rounds of the Al Maktoum Challenge. On Dubai World Cup Night he was moved up in distance to contest the Dubai Sheema Classic over one and a half miles on turf. Ridden by Mickael Barzalona he never looked likely to make a serious challenge and finished tenth of the eleven runners behind St Nicholas Abbey. Prince Bishop made his first appearance in Europe for twenty-two months when he contested the Group Three September Stakes at Kempton on 7 September. Ridden by Kieren Fallon started 7/1 fourth choice in the betting behind Royal Empire (winner of the Geoffrey Freer Stakes), Main Sequence and Masterstroke (Grand Prix de Deauville, third in the Prix de l'Arc de Triomphe). He tracked the leaders before producing a sustained run in the straight to catch Main Sequence in the final strides and win by a head. On his final run of the year, Prince Bishop ran very poorly in the St Simon Stakes on heavy ground at Newbury Racecourse, finishing tailed-off last of the eight runners.

=== 2014: seven-year-old season ===
Prince Bishop began his fifth season in the second round of the Al Maktoum Challenge at Meydan. Ridden by Fallon, he started at 14/1 and was the least fancied of the three Godolphin runners behind African Story and Hunter's Light. The other runners included Dunaden, Heavy Metal (Durban July Handicap), and Battle of Marengo (Derrinstown Stud Derby Trial). Fallon sent Prince Bishop into the lead 700 metres from the finish and stayed on in the straight to win by one and a quarter lengths from African Story. Prince Bishop faced African Story again in the third round of the challenge on 8 March and started 5/1 second favourite behind his stablemate. He raced in mid-division before taking the lead in the straight and winning by one and a quarter lengths from Sanshaawes with Joshua Tree in sixth and African Story in eighth. Three weeks later, Prince Bishop started at odds of 8/1 in his third bid for the Dubai World Cup. He started slowly, never looked likely, and finished ninth of the sixteen runners behind African Story. On his only European run of 2014, Prince Bishop attempted to repeat his 2013 success in the September Stakes at Kempton. He started at odds of 15/2 in a field headed by his stablemate Secret Number (winner of the Cumberland Lodge Stakes), with the other runners including Red Cadeaux ,(Hong Kong Vase) and Dandino (winner of the race in 2012). Ridden by Frederik Tylicki and carrying top weight of 138 pounds he took the lead a furlong out and won by two lengths from Secret Number. After the race Tylicki said, "He's not run for 161 days but he felt like there was a lot left. It was a very smart performance giving weight away in what was probably one of the best Group 3s you'll see".

=== 2015: eight-year-old season ===
Before the start of the 2015 season, the Tapeta surface at Meydan was removed and replaced with a dirt track. For the fifth year in succession, Prince Bishop began his campaign by contesting the Al Maktoum Challenge, finishing second by a head to Frankyfourfingers in the second round on 5 February. He started 6/4 favourite for the third leg on 7 March but failed by a neck to overhaul African Story with Frankyfourfingers in fourth place.

On 28 March, Prince Bishop, ridden by William Buick, ran for the fourth time in the Dubai World Cup. The return to dirt saw a strong challenge from North America, and the betting was headed by the American Horse of the Year California Chrome at odds of 5/4 with the Donn Handicap winner Lea next in the market on 4/1. Japan was represented by the Japan Cup winner Epiphaneia and the Japanese dirt champion Hokko Tarumae. African Story was made an 8/1 chance to repeat his 2014 success whilst Prince Bishop started at odds of 14/1. He raced towards the rear of the field and appeared to be struggling as Hokko Tarumae set a strong pace from African Story and California Chrome. He began to make progress at half distance and moved up on the outside to challenge for the lead on the final turn. He overtook California Chrome 300 metres from the finish and drew away to win by two and three quarter lengths. After the race, Buick said, "I don’t go numb very often but I can’t explain what I’m feeling right now. He has a very unorthodox was of racing so I took him out of the kickback in the back and when I got onto California Chrome's tail, he picked up the bridle and ran on well in the end. He likes the surface now that he has the experience, he is better than he was. This is just nuts."

On 23 April, it was announced that Prince Bishop would be retired from racing. African Story was retired on the same day, and Saeed bin Suroor paid tribute to the pair, saying, "They were very tough and reliable racehorses... they could adapt quickly to their environment no matter where in the world they were taken to race."

== Pedigree ==
Pedigree of Prince Bishop (IRE), chestnut colt, 2007
| Sire Dubawi (IRE) 2002 | Dubai Millennium (GB); 1996 | Seeking the Gold | Mr. Prospector |
| Sire Dubawi (IRE) 2002 | Dubai Millennium (GB); 1996 | Seeking the Gold | Con Game |
| Sire Dubawi (IRE) 2002 | Dubai Millennium (GB); 1996 | Colorado Dancer | Shareef Dancer |
| Sire Dubawi (IRE) 2002 | Dubai Millennium (GB); 1996 | Colorado Dancer | Fall Aspen |
| Sire Dubawi (IRE) 2002 | Zomaradah (GB); 1995 | Deploy | Shirley Heights |
| Sire Dubawi (IRE) 2002 | Zomaradah (GB); 1995 | Deploy | Slightly Dangerous |
| Sire Dubawi (IRE) 2002 | Zomaradah (GB); 1995 | Jawaher | Dancing Brave |
| Sire Dubawi (IRE) 2002 | Zomaradah (GB); 1995 | Jawaher | High Tern |
| Dam North East Bay (USA) 2001 | Prospect Bay (CAN); 1992 | Crafty Prospector | Mr. Prospector |
| Dam North East Bay (USA) 2001 | Prospect Bay (CAN); 1992 | Crafty Prospector | Real Crafty Lady |
| Dam North East Bay (USA) 2001 | Prospect Bay (CAN); 1992 | Baltic Sea | Danzig |
| Dam North East Bay (USA) 2001 | Prospect Bay (CAN); 1992 | Baltic Sea | Renounce |
| Dam North East Bay (USA) 2001 | Wassifa (GB); 1988 | Sure Blade | Kris |
| Dam North East Bay (USA) 2001 | Wassifa (GB); 1988 | Sure Blade | Double Lock |
| Dam North East Bay (USA) 2001 | Wassifa (GB); 1988 | Rye Tops | Ile de Bourbon |
| Dam North East Bay (USA) 2001 | Wassifa (GB); 1988 | Rye Tops | Topsy (Family: 3-c) |

- Prince Bishop is inbred 4x4 to Mr. Prospector, meaning that this stallion appears twice in the fourth generations of his pedigree.
