= Dubai Millennium =

British-bred Thoroughbred racehorse

- Racing colours of Godolphin
- Sire: Seeking The Gold
- Grandsire: Mr. Prospector
- Dam: Colorado Dancer
- Damsire: Shareef Dancer
- Sex: Stallion
- Foaled: 2 March 1996
- Died: 29 April 2001 (aged 5)
- Country: Great Britain
- Colour: Bay
- Breeder: Sheikh Mohammed
- Owner: Godolphin Stables
- Trainer: David Loder; Saeed bin Suroor
- Record: 10: 9-0-0
- Earnings: $4,452,047

Major wins
- Predominate Stakes (1999); Prix Eugène Adam (1999); Prix Jacques Le Marois (1999); Queen Elizabeth II Stakes (1999); Al Maktoum Challenge, Round 3 (2000); Dubai World Cup (2000); Prince of Wales's Stakes (2000)

Awards
- Timeform rating: 140; British Champions Series Hall of Fame (2024)
- Last updated on 27 August 2024

Dubai Millennium (2 March 1996 – 29 April 2001) was a British-bred Thoroughbred racehorse and sire. The colt was trained in the United Kingdom and Dubai during his racing career from 1998 and 2000. He is notable for winning a series of major races in 1999 and 2000, including the Dubai World Cup. He died after contracting grass sickness at the age of five.

== Background ==
Dubai Millennium was foaled on 2 March 1996 at the Dalham Hall Stud. He was by the Mr. Prospector stallion Seeking The Gold, out of the Prix de Pomone winner Colorado Dancer. Apart from Dubai Millennium, Seeking the Gold sired the winners of 27 Group One/Grade I races including Pleasant Home, Jazil, and Bob and John Colorado Dancer was a daughter of Fall Aspen, a highly successful broodmare who produced eight winners of Group/Graded races including Preakness Stakes winner Timber Country.

Dubai Millennium was originally sent into training with David Loder at Newmarket and was ridden in all but one of his races by Frankie Dettori.

He was initially named Yaazer^{1} (meaning "white gazelle"), but Sheikh Mohammed, owner of Godolphin, renamed the colt Dubai Millennium after he was identified^{2} as the most promising of his two-year-old colts.

== Racing career ==
=== 1998: two-year-old season ===
Dubai Millennium made his debut as a two-year-old at Yarmouth in October 1998. He started odds-on favourite and won by five lengths despite being eased down by jockey Frankie Dettori in the closing stages.

At the end of the year, Dubai Millennium was transferred to the stable of Saeed bin Suroor and wintered at the Godolphin training facility in Dubai.

During the winter, he began to appear in the betting list for the following year's Derby, although some felt that his name was the main reason for the attention.

=== 1999: three-year-old season ===
Dubai Millennium began his three-year-old season at Doncaster in May, where he was "impressive" in leading from the start and winning by nine lengths. On his next start, he was moved up in class and distance for the Listed Predominate Stakes over a mile and a quarter at Goodwood, a recognised trial for the Derby. Accompanied by a large Godolphin entourage and looking "magnificent", he started at odds of 4/11. In the race, he moved to take the lead two furlongs from home and went clear to win by three and a half lengths. Immediately afterwards, his connections expressed no worries about the Derby distance, although some concern was expressed about the possibility of firm ground, which was felt to be unsuitable for such a big, heavily built horse.

Dubai Millennium was reported to have thrived after Goodwood and was sent to Epsom for the Derby, where he was made favourite, although his starting price of 5/1 reflected the open nature of a race in which many lightly raced, untested colts were entered. He pulled hard early on, and after making a brief effort early in the straight, finished ninth of the sixteen runners, beaten just over nine lengths by Oath. It was his only defeat and the only time he was tried over the mile and a half distance.

Following the Derby, Dubai Millennium was campaigned over shorter races for the rest of the season. In July, he was sent to France for the Group Two Prix Eugène Adam at Maisons-Laffitte and led from the start to win "unchallenged" by three lengths.

Hopes that he would be matched against Royal Anthem in the International Stakes were not fulfilled as he was instead brought back to one mile for the Prix Jacques Le Marois at Deauville. On heavy, rain-softened ground he once again led all the way and "surged" clear in the closing stages to beat the Grand Prix de Paris winner Slickly by two and a half lengths. The leading French colt Sendawar was withdrawn because of the soft ground. After the race, Dettori called Dubai Millennium "a champion".

On his final start of the year, in the Queen Elizabeth II Stakes at Ascot, he took the lead two furlongs from the finish and pulled clear to win by six lengths. After the race, Sheikh Mohammed made clear his view that Dubai Millennium was the best horse ever prepared by his Godolphin organisation and that he would be aimed at the following year's Dubai World Cup.

=== 2000: four-year-old season ===
Dubai Millennium once again wintered in the Persian Gulf and warmed up for the Dubai World Cup with a four and a half length win over the Prince of Wales's Stakes winner Lear Spear in a round of the Listed Sheikh Maktoum bin Rashid al Maktoum Challenge in which he raced on dirt for the first time.

In the World Cup three weeks later, he led after a furlong and pulled steadily away from the field in the closing stages to win in "devastating fashion" beating Behrens by six lengths with the rest of the opposition at least five lengths further back. His performance in winning the world's most valuable horse race in track-record time was acclaimed as an "awesome display", and Dettori called the colt "the best I've ever ridden... absolutely unbelievable".

On his return to Europe, Dubai Millennium contested the Prince of Wales's Stakes at Royal Ascot, in which he was ridden by Jerry Bailey, Dettori having been injured in a plane crash. In this race, he was finally matched against Sendawar, who by now had won four Group One races and was unbeaten for more than a year. Such was the reputation of the French colt that, for the only time in his career, Dubai Millennium was not the favourite, starting at odds of 5/4 behind Sendawar at 6/5. The challenge did not materialise, however, with Dubai Millennium leading from the start and finishing eight lengths clear of the German challenger Sumitas, with Sendawar, who had attempted to track the winner throughout the race, fading into fourth. When Bailey was asked to compare Dubai Millennium with the American champion Cigar, he described him as "equally impressive."

Sheikh Mohammed clearly considered Dubai Millennium the greatest racehorse in the world and sought to race him against Michael Tabor's Arc and King George winner Montjeu, offering to pay Montjeu's entry fee to the Breeders' Cup. Tabor resisted the challenge but told the media he wanted the two horses to be pitted against each other. A media circus erupted, culminating in Sheikh Mohammed proposing a one:one meeting between the two horses and putting down $6 million to back Dubai Millennium to win. Tabor was to match the wager if he took up the challenge. On the morning of Saturday, August 5, as copies of Racing Post bearing the challenge to Tabor from Sheikh Mohammed were distributed, Dubai Millennium suffered a broken leg (a "lateral condylar fracture") in training. His life was saved by an operation, but his racing career was over.

== Race record ==
Date	Race	Dist (f)	Course	Class	Prize (£K)	Odds	Runners	Placing	Margin	Time	Jockey	Trainer
28 October 1998	South Norfolk Caterers Maiden Stakes	8	Yarmouth	M	3	4/9	18	1	5	1:43.30	Frankie Dettori	David Loder
3 May 1999	Doncaster Sponsorship Club Stakes	8	Doncaster		5	4/6	4	1	9	1:36.60	Frankie Dettori	Saeed bin Suroor
18 May 1999	Predominate Stakes	10	Goodwood	L	20	4/11	6	1	3.5	2:07.54	Frankie Dettori	Saeed bin Suroor
5 June 1999	Derby	12	Epsom	1	611	5/1	16	9	9.25	2:37.43	Frankie Dettori	Saeed bin Suroor
18 July 1999	Prix Eugène Adam	10	Maisons-Laffitte	2	32	7/10	5	1	3	2:03.60	Frankie Dettori	Saeed bin Suroor
15 August 1999	Prix Jacques Le Marois	8	Deauville	1	107	4/1	5	1	2.5	1:44.30	Frankie Dettori	Saeed bin Suroor
26 September 1999	Queen Elizabeth II Stakes	8	Ascot	1	195	4/9	4	1	6	1:46.24	Frankie Dettori	Saeed bin Suroor
2 March 2000	Maktoum bin Rashid al Maktoum Challenge	10	Nad Al Sheba	L			6	1	4.5		Frankie Dettori	Saeed bin Suroor
25 March 2000	Dubai World Cup	10	Nad Al Sheba	1	2195	1/2	13	1	6	1:59.50	Frankie Dettori	Saeed bin Suroor
21 June 2000	Prince of Wales's Stakes	10	Ascot	1	156	5/4	6	1	8	2.07.48	Jerry Bailey	Saeed bin Suroor

== Assessment ==
In the International Classification (the forerunner of the World Thoroughbred Racehorse Rankings), Dubai Millennium was named the best racehorse in the world in 2000. His rating of 134 was ahead of Sinndar (132) and Montjeu (130). The rating was considered rather disappointing for those who had considered him a true "great". He had previously been awarded a rating of 127 for his 1999 performances.

Dubai Millennium was given a Timeform rating of 140, the highest since Dancing Brave in 1986. It placed him in the top ten since that organisation was founded in 1948.

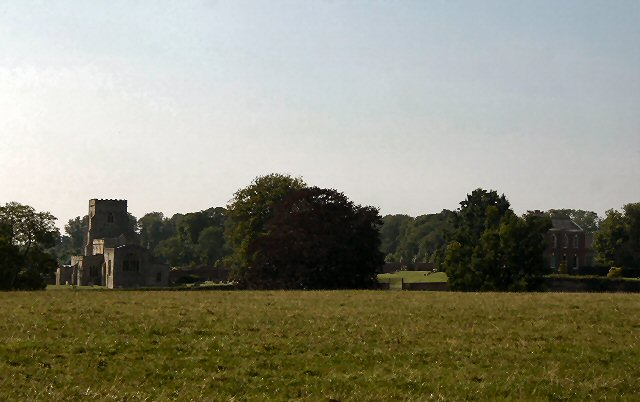
Dalham, where Dubai Millennium was born and died

Dubai Millennium never won a Cartier Racing Award. In 1999 he was beaten to the titles of Champion Three-Year-Old Colt and Horse of the Year by Montjeu and Daylami respectively. A year later Giant's Causeway was Horse of the Year, with Kalanisi being named Champion Older Horse.

== Stud career ==
Dubai Millennium was retired to the Dalham Hall Stud, part of the Darley Stud organisation. His stallion fee in his first season was set at £100,000.

In April 2001, the horse became gravely ill with what was quickly diagnosed as grass sickness. Intensive veterinary treatment and three operations were not sufficient to save Dubai Millennium, and he was euthanised whilst still under anaesthetic on 29 April. The Dick Vet research finally isolated a neurotoxic enzyme similar to snake venom and has postulated this enzyme as the probable cause of equine grass sickness. He is buried at the Dalham Hall Stud.

His only crop of foals produced several winners, including the Prix Daniel Wildenstein winner Echo of Light and, most notably, Dubawi. Dubawi won National Stakes, the Irish 2,000 Guineas and the Prix Jacques Le Marois and went on to sire the 2,000 Guineas winner Makfi and many other important winners.

== Pedigree ==
Pedigree of Dubai Millennium (GB), bay stallion, 1996
Sire Seeking The Gold (USA) 1985	Mr. Prospector (USA); 1970	Raise a Native	Native Dancer
Sire Seeking The Gold (USA) 1985	Mr. Prospector (USA); 1970	Raise a Native	Raise You
Sire Seeking The Gold (USA) 1985	Mr. Prospector (USA); 1970	Gold Digger	Nashua
Sire Seeking The Gold (USA) 1985	Mr. Prospector (USA); 1970	Gold Digger	Sequence
Sire Seeking The Gold (USA) 1985	Con Game (USA); 1974	Buckpasser	Tom Fool
Sire Seeking The Gold (USA) 1985	Con Game (USA); 1974	Buckpasser	Busanda
Sire Seeking The Gold (USA) 1985	Con Game (USA); 1974	Broadway	Hasty Road
Sire Seeking The Gold (USA) 1985	Con Game (USA); 1974	Broadway	Flitabout
Dam Colorado Dancer (IRE) 1986	Shareef Dancer (USA); 1980	Northern Dancer	Nearctic
Dam Colorado Dancer (IRE) 1986	Shareef Dancer (USA); 1980	Northern Dancer	Natalma
Dam Colorado Dancer (IRE) 1986	Shareef Dancer (USA); 1980	Sweet Alliance	Sir Ivor
Dam Colorado Dancer (IRE) 1986	Shareef Dancer (USA); 1980	Sweet Alliance	Mrs Peterkin
Dam Colorado Dancer (IRE) 1986	Fall Aspen (USA); 1976	Pretense	Endeavour II
Dam Colorado Dancer (IRE) 1986	Fall Aspen (USA); 1976	Pretense	Imitation
Dam Colorado Dancer (IRE) 1986	Fall Aspen (USA); 1976	Change Water	Swaps
Dam Colorado Dancer (IRE) 1986	Fall Aspen (USA); 1976	Change Water	Portage

== See also ==
- List of leading Thoroughbred racehorses

== Notes ==
^{1} The colt's original name has also been reported as "Yazzer", "Yazaar" and "Yareek".

^{2} Sources differ as to whether the colt was identified by David Loder or Sheikh Mohammed.
