= Dubai World Cup =

Thoroughbred horse race held annually since 1996 and played at the Meydan Racecourse

- Logo
- Class: Group 1
- Location: Meydan Racecourse; Dubai, United Arab Emirates
- Inaugurated: 1996
- Race type: Thoroughbred - Flat racing
- Website: www.dubairacingclub.com

Race information
- Distance: 2,000 metres (about 10 furlongs)
- Surface: Dirt
- Track: Left-handed
- Qualification: Northern Hemisphere 4yo+ & Southern Hemisphere 3yo+
- Weight: SH 3yo: 54.5kg. NH & SH 4yo+: 57kg
- Purse: US$12 million (2025; race)

Dubai World Cup
2026
Magnitude	Forever Young	Meydaan

Previous years
2025
Hit Show	Mixto	Forever Young
2024
Laurel River	Ushba Tesoro	Senor Buscador
2023
Ushba Tesoro	Algiers	Emblem Road
2022
Country Grammer	Hot Rod Charlie	Chuwa Wizard
2021
Mystic Guide	Chuwa Wizard	Magny Cours

2020-2011
2019
Thunder Snow	Gronkowski	Gunnevera
2018
Thunder Snow	West Coast	Mubtaahij
2017
Arrogate	Gun Runner	Neolithic
2016
California Chrome	Mubtaahij	Hoppertunity
2015
Prince Bishop	California Chrome	Lea
2014
African Story	Mukhadram	Cat O'Mountain
2013
Animal Kingdom	Red Cadeaux	Planteur
2012
Monterosso	Capponi	Planteur
2011
Victoire Pisa	Transcend	Monterosso

2010-2001
2010
Gloria De Campeao	Lizard's Desire	Allybar
2009
Well Armed	Gloria De Campeao	Paris Perfect
2008
Curlin	Asiatic Boy	Well Armed
2007
Invasor	Premium Tap	Bullish Luck
2006
Electrocutionist	Wilko	Magna Graduate
2005
Roses In May	Dynever	Choctaw Nation
2004
Pleasantly Perfect	Medaglia d'Oro	Victory Moon
2003
Moon Ballad	Harlan's Holiday	Nayef
2002
Street Cry	Sei Mi	Sakhee
2001
Captain Steve	To The Victory	Hightori

2000-1996
2000
Dubai Millennium	Behrens	Public Purse
1999
Almutawakel	Malek	Victory Gallop
1998
Silver Charm	Swain	Loup Sauvage
1997
Singspiel	Siphon	Sandpit
1996
Cigar	Soul Of The Matter	L'Carriere

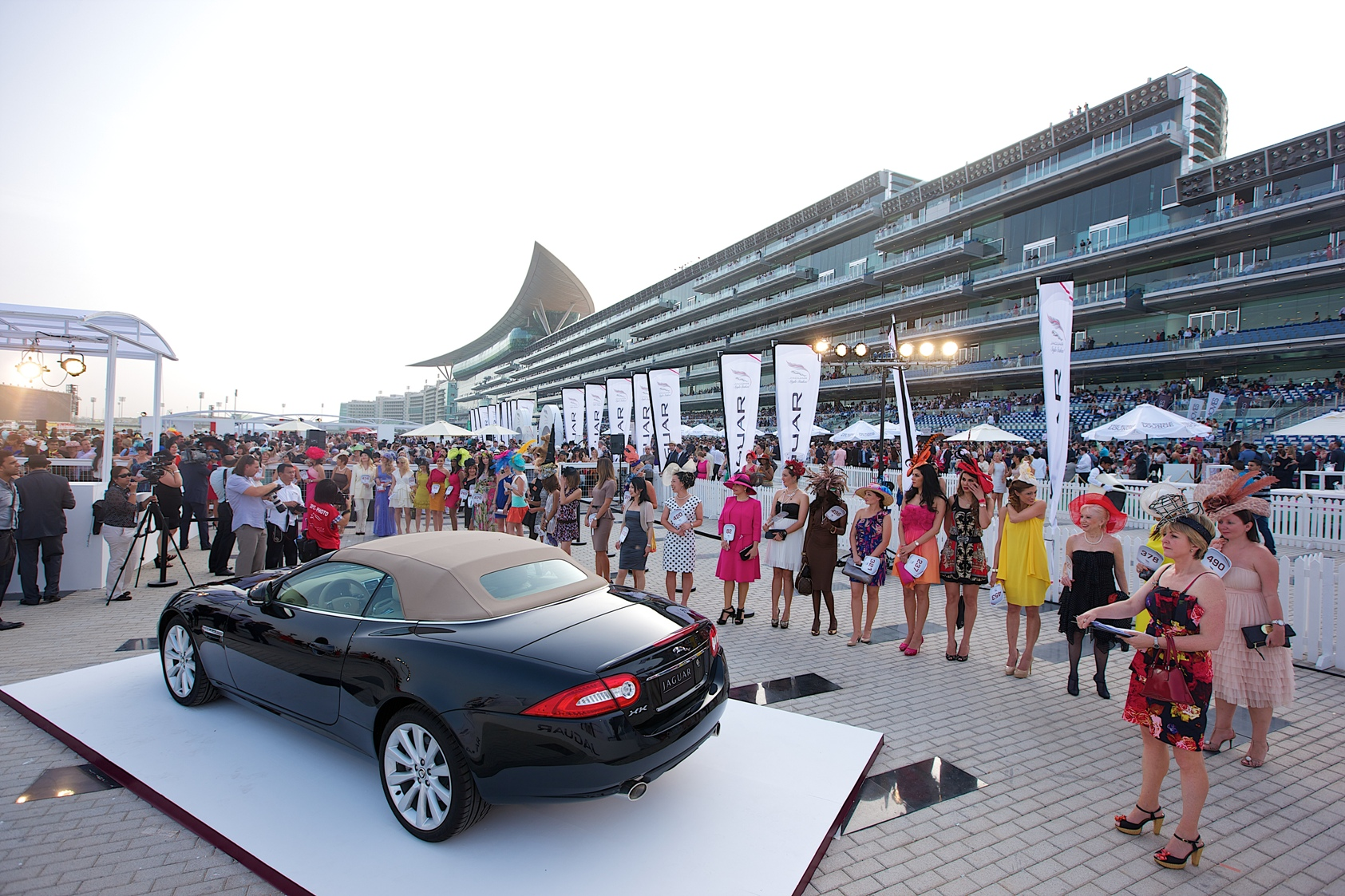
The Meydan grandstand

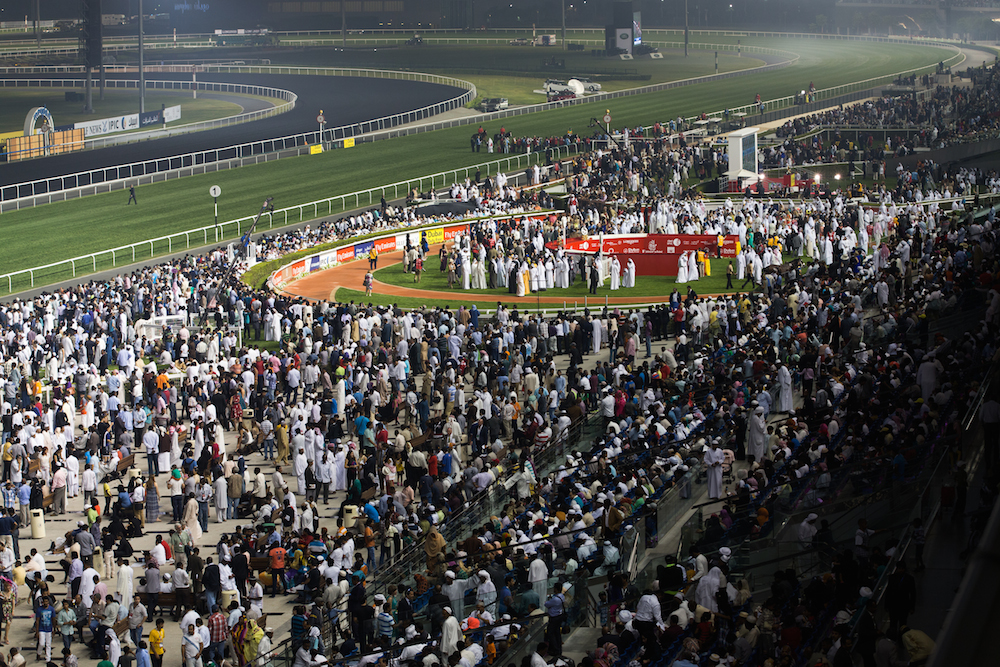
The parade ring during the Dubai World Cup meeting

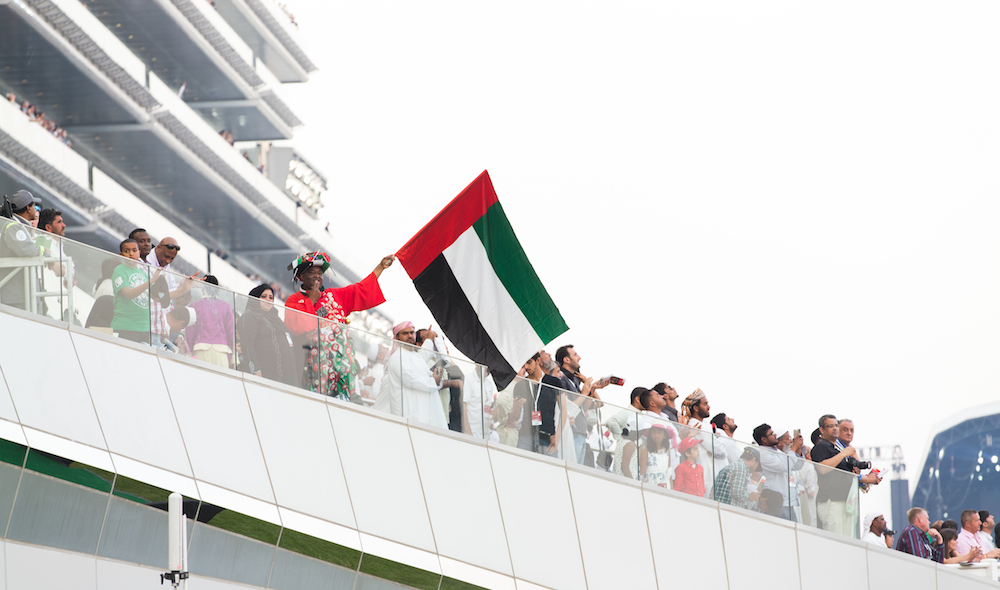
A UAE supporter at the Dubai World Cup

The Dubai World Cup (Arabic: كأس دبي العالمي) is a Thoroughbred horse race held annually since 1996 and contested at the Meydan Racecourse in Dubai, United Arab Emirates. The race is operated by Emirates Racing Authority (ERA) and carries a purse of US$12 million.

== History ==
The Dubai World Cup was created in 1996 by Sheikh Mohammed bin Rashid Al Maktoum, Vice President and Prime Minister of the UAE and Ruler of Dubai and the owner of Darley Stud & Godolphin Racing.

It is held on the last Saturday in March as the final race of the Dubai World Cup Night. It is a Group 1 flat race on dirt over a distance of 2,000 metres (about 10 furlongs). It is open for Northern Hemisphere Thoroughbred four-year-olds & up and for Southern Hemisphere Thoroughbred three-year-olds & up. Since its 2019 running, the race has carried a purse of $12 million, regaining its place as the world's richest horse race, a record held by the Pegasus World Cup in 2017 and 2018. It was held at Nad Al Sheba Racecourse before 2009. In 2010, the Dubai World Cup was first held at the new Meydan Racecourse on March 27, on all-weather surface known as Tapeta. However, it was held as dirt race again in 2015 due to the high maintenance cost and being an unpopular condition among American participants.

The race's first winner was the future United States Hall of Fame Thoroughbred Cigar, owned by Allen E. Paulson. A plaque honoring that horse hangs outside the barn of Bill Mott at Belmont Park.

In 2006 the Dubai World Cup was broadcast live on TVG Network and HRTV and taped later for showing on ABC. It was the first time that the race was shown on national TV in the United States.

The 2020 event was cancelled due to the COVID-19 pandemic. it was the 25th edition of the race and was scheduled to take place on 28 March 2020. Previous on March 12, it was announced that the race would go ahead as planned, but with no spectators in attendance, due to the COVID-19 pandemic. However, on March 22, it was announced that the race had been cancelled, and that the 25th anniversary celebrations would be postponed until the 2021 running.

== Records ==
Speed record:

- 2:01.61 (synthetic) - African Story (2014) since the race has been at Meydan Racecourse
- 2:01.38 (dirt) - Thunder Snow (2018) since Meydan was converted from synthetic to dirt
- 1:59.50 - Dubai Millennium (2000) at Nad Al Sheba Racecourse

Most wins:

- 2 - Thunder Snow (2018, 2019)

Most wins by an owner:

- 9 - Godolphin Racing (2000, 2002, 2003, 2006, 2012, 2014, 2018, 2019, 2021)

Most wins by a jockey:

- 4 - Jerry Bailey (1996, 1997, 2001, 2002)
- 4 - Frankie Dettori (2000, 2003, 2006, 2022)

Most wins by a trainer:

- 9 - Saeed bin Suroor (1999, 2000, 2002, 2003, 2006, 2014, 2015, 2018, 2019)

== Winners ==
Year	Winner _{(CB)}	Age	Jockey	Trainer	Owner	Time
1996	Cigar (USA)	6	Jerry Bailey (USA)	William I. Mott (USA)	Allen E. Paulson (USA)	2:03.84
1997	Singspiel (IRE)	5	Jerry Bailey (USA)	Michael Stoute (GB)	Sheikh Mohammed (UAE)	2:01.91
1998	Silver Charm (USA)	4	Gary Stevens (USA)	Bob Baffert (USA)	Bob & Beverly Lewis (USA)	2:04.29
1999	Almutawakel (GB)	4	Richard Hills (GB)	Saeed bin Suroor (UAE)	Hamdan Al Maktoum (UAE)	2:00.65
2000	Dubai Millennium (GB)	4	Frankie Dettori (ITA)	Saeed bin Suroor (UAE)	Godolphin Racing (UAE)	1:59.50
2001	Captain Steve (USA)	4	Jerry Bailey (USA)	Bob Baffert (USA)	Michael E. Pegram (USA)	2:00.47
2002	Street Cry (IRE)	4	Jerry Bailey (USA)	Saeed bin Suroor (UAE)	Godolphin Racing (UAE)	2:01.18
2003	Moon Ballad (IRE)	4	Frankie Dettori (ITA)	Saeed bin Suroor (UAE)	Godolphin Racing (UAE)	2:00.48
2004	Pleasantly Perfect (USA)	6	Alex Solis (PAN)	Richard Mandella (USA)	Diamond A Racing Corp. (USA)	2:00.24
2005	Roses in May (USA)	5	John Velazquez (PUR)	Dale L. Romans (USA)	Ken & Sarah Ramsey (USA)	2:02.17
2006	Electrocutionist (USA)	5	Frankie Dettori (ITA)	Saeed bin Suroor (UAE)	Godolphin Racing (UAE)	2:01.32
2007	Invasor (ARG)	5	Fernando Jara (PAN)	Kiaran McLaughlin (USA)	Hamdan Al Maktoum (UAE)	1:59.97
2008	Curlin (USA)	4	Robby Albarado (USA)	Steve Asmussen (USA)	Stonestreet Stables LLC (USA), Midnight Cry Stables (USA)	2:00.15
2009	Well Armed (USA)	6	Aaron Gryder (USA)	Eoin G. Harty (USA)	WinStar Farm LLC (USA)	2:01.01
2010	Glória de Campeão (BRA)	7	T. J. Pereira (BRA)	Pascal Bary (FRA)	Stud Estrela Energia (BRA)	2:03.83
2011	Victoire Pisa (JPN)	4	Mirco Demuro (ITA)	Katsuhiko Sumii (JPN)	Yoshimi Ichikawa (JPN)	2:05.94
2012	Monterosso (GB)	5	Mickael Barzalona (FRA)	Mahmood al Zarooni (UAE)	Godolphin Racing (UAE)	2:02.67
2013	Animal Kingdom (USA)	5	Joel Rosario (DOM)	Graham Motion (USA)	Arrowfield Stud (AUS), Team Valor Stable LLC (USA)	2:03.21
2014	African Story (GB)	7	Silvestre de Sousa (BRA)	Saeed bin Suroor (UAE)	Godolphin Racing (UAE)	2:01.61
2015	Prince Bishop (IRE)	8	William Buick (NOR)	Saeed bin Suroor (UAE)	Hamdan bin Mohammed Al Maktoum (UAE)	2:03.24
2016	California Chrome (USA)	5	Victor Espinoza (MEX)	Art Sherman (USA)	California Chrome LLC (USA)	2:01.83
2017	Arrogate (USA)	4	Mike E. Smith (USA)	Bob Baffert (USA)	Juddmonte Farms (KSA)	2:02.15
2018	Thunder Snow (IRE)	4	Christophe Soumillon (BEL)	Saeed bin Suroor (UAE)	Godolphin (UAE)	2:01.38
2019	Thunder Snow (IRE)	5	Christophe Soumillon (BEL)	Saeed bin Suroor (UAE)	Godolphin (UAE)	2:03.87
2020	Cancelled due to the COVID-19 pandemic.					
2021	Mystic Guide (USA)	4	Luis Saez (PAN)	Mike Stidham (USA)	Godolphin (UAE)	2:01.61
2022	Country Grammer (USA)	5	Frankie Dettori (ITA)	Bob Baffert (USA)	Zedan Racing Stables (KSA), WinStar Farm (USA) & Commonwealth T'Breds	2:04.97
2023	Ushba Tesoro (JPN)	6	Yuga Kawada (JPN)	Noboru Takagi (JPN)	Ryotokuji Kenji Holdings Co., Ltd. (JPN)	2:03.25
2024	Laurel River (USA)	6	Tadhg O'Shea (IRE)	Bhupat Seemar (UAE)	Juddmonte Farms (KSA)	2:02.31
2025	Hit Show (USA)	5	Florent Geroux (FRA)	Brad H. Cox (USA)	Wathnan Racing (QAT)	2:03.50
2026	Magnitude (USA)	4	Jose L. Ortiz (PUR)	Steven M. Asmussen (USA)	Winchell Thoroughbreds LLC (USA)	2:04.38

== Performances ==
- 2012 - Toni Braxton
- 2013 - Seal
- 2014 - Jennifer Lopez
- 2015 - Kylie Minogue
- 2016 - Janet Jackson
- 2017 - Sia with Maddie Ziegler
- 2018 - Flo Rida
- 2019 - Gwen Stefani
- 2022 - Becky Hill with Rudimental & Sigala DJ Sets

== See also ==
- Dubai World Cup Night
- List of United Arab Emirates horse races
