= Singspiel (horse) =

Irish-bred Thoroughbred racehorse

- Racing colours of Sheikh Mohammed
- Sire: In The Wings
- Grandsire: Sadler's Wells
- Dam: Glorious Song
- Damsire: Halo
- Sex: Stallion
- Foaled: 25 February 1992
- Country: Ireland
- Colour: Bay
- Breeder: Sheikh Mohammed
- Owner: Mohammed bin Rashid Al Maktoum
- Trainer: Michael Stoute
- Jockey: Lanfranco Dettori
- Record: 20: 9-8-0
- Earnings: $5,952,825

Major wins
- Gordon Richards Stakes (1996); Select Stakes (1996); Canadian International Stakes (1996); Japan Cup (1996); Dubai World Cup (1997); Coronation Cup (1997); International Stakes (1997)

Awards
- Eclipse Award for Outstanding Male Turf Horse (1996)

Honours
- Singspiel Stakes at Woodbine Race Track
- Last updated on 12 October 2006

Singspiel (25 February 1992 – 1 July 2010) was an Irish-bred Thoroughbred racehorse and sire best known for a series of wins in major international races in 1996 and 1997. In a racing career which lasted from September 1994 until August 1997 he won nine of his twenty races and finished second on eight occasions. After showing good, but unexceptional form in his first two seasons he emerged as a world class performer in 1996 when he won the Canadian International Stakes and Japan Cup and was named U.S. Champion Male Turf Horse. In the following season he added victories in the Dubai World Cup, Coronation Cup and International Stakes before his career was ended by injury. After his retirement from racing he had considerable success as a sire of winners before his death in 2010.

== Background ==
Singspiel was a small, dark-coated bay horse with a small white star bred in Ireland by his owner Sheikh Mohammed. He was sired by In the Wings, a son of Sadler's Wells whose wins included the Coronation Cup, the Grand Prix de Saint-Cloud and the Breeders' Cup Turf in America. At stud he also sired Winged Love (Irish Derby), Adlerflug (German Derby), Act One (Prix Lupin), Kutub (Singapore Gold Cup) and Mamool (Grosser Preis von Baden). Singspiel's dam was the Eclipse Award winner and Canadian Horse Racing Hall of Fame Glorious Song who also produced the successful racehorse and breeding stallion Rahy.

The colt was sent into training with Michael Stoute at the Freemason Lodge stables at Newmarket, Suffolk.

== Racing career ==
=== 1994: two-year-old season ===
Singspiel began his racing career at Leicester Racecourse on 6 September 1994, when he finished fifth in a maiden race over seven furlongs. Two weeks later he recorded his first victory when he was made the 4/6 favourite for the Marford Maiden Stakes at Chester Racecourse and won from seven opponents. On 8 October he ran in the Hyperion Stakes at Ascot Racecourse. Singspiel proved no match for the year's outstanding two-year-old Celtic Swing, who beat him by eight lengths, but he finished ten lengths clear of the other runners.

=== 1995: three-year-old season ===
As a three-year-old in 1995 Singspiel ran consistently but won only once from six races. He began his season by running second by a neck to Pentire in the Sandown Classic Trial and then finished fourth to Luso when favourite for the Chester Vase. He then finished second to Valanour in the Grand Prix de Paris and to Halling in the Eclipse Stakes, beaten a neck on each occasion. He was beaten a short head by Pentire in the Great Voltigeur Stakes before winning the Troy Stakes at Doncaster Racecourse in September.

=== 1996: four-year-old season ===
Singspiel began his third season on 27 April at Sandown Park Racecourse, when he defeated his stable companion Pilsudski by three lengths in the Gordon Richards Stakes. He was then beaten a neck by Swain in the Coronation Cup at Epsom Downs Racecourse in June and finished second to Posidonas in the Princess of Wales's Stakes at Newmarket Racecourse in July.

In September Singspiel won the Select Stakes over ten furlongs at Goodwood Racecourse from three opponents and then began to race outside Europe. On 29 September he was made favourite for the Canadian International Stakes at Woodbine Racecourse and won by two lengths from the local champion Chief Bearhart under a "hands and heels" ride from Gary Stevens. A month later he returned to Woodbine for the thirteenth running of the Breeders' Cup Turf. He finished second to Pilsudski, ahead of a strong field including Swain, Shantou, Awad, Dushyantor and Chief Bearhart. In November, Singspiel was sent to Tokyo Racecourse to contest the Japan Cup. Ridden by Frankie Dettori he won a closely contested finish by a nose from the Japanese filly Fabulous La Fouine with the Prix de l'Arc de Triomphe winner Helissio in third.

In January 1997, Singspiel won the Eclipse Award for Outstanding Male Turf Horse ahead of Fastness and Diplomatic Jet.

=== 1997: five-year-old season ===
In early 1997, Singspiel was sent to the United Arab Emirates where he was trained for the second running of the Dubai World Cup on 3 April. Racing on dirt for the first time, Sheikh Mohammed's horse was ridden by the American jockey Jerry Bailey who had won the inaugural running of the race on Cigar. After an eventful race, in which two horses fell, Singspiel claimed the £1.5 million prize, beating the Santa Anita Handicap winner Siphon by one and a quarter lengths. The beaten horses included Formal Gold who went on to defeat Skip Away in the Woodward Stakes. Bailey said that "with Singspiel's attitude, I knew I could take on anything", while Stoute described the win as the horse's "crowning moment". On his return to England was an easy winner of the Coronation Cup, beating Dushyantor by five lengths. In July he finished fourth behind Swain, Pilsudski and Helissio in the King George VI and Queen Elizabeth Stakes at Ascot Racecourse. Sinspiel's final race was the International Stakes at York on 19 August in which his three rivals were the outstanding filly Bosra Sham, The Derby winner Benny the Dip and the Irish Derby winner Desert King. Ridden by Dettori, Singspiel took the lead in the straight and stayed on "gamely" to win by one and a half lengths from Desert King.

Singspiel was being prepared for a second attempt at the Breeders' Cup Turf at Hollywood Park when he sustained a condylar fracture of his right front leg and was retired from racing.

== Stud career ==
Singspiel was retired after the 1997 season and was sent to Sheikh Mohammed's Dalham Hall Stud near Newmarket in England to stand at stud. He was "shuttled" to stand in Australia in 2001 but the experiment was not repeated after the stallion responded poorly to air travel.

=== Major winners ===
c = colt, f = filly, g = gelding

Foaled	Name	Sex	Major Wins
1999	Moon Ballad	c	Dubai World Cup
1999	Asakusa Den'en	c	Yasuda Kinen
2000	Papineau	g	Ascot Gold Cup
2003	Lateral	c	Gran Criterium
2003	Lahudood	f	Flower Bowl Invitational Stakes, Breeders' Cup Filly & Mare Turf
2003	Confidential Lady	f	Prix de Diane
2004	Eastern Anthem	c	Dubai Sheema Classic
2004	Folk Opera	f	E. P. Taylor Stakes
2005	Dar Re Mi	f	Pretty Polly Stakes, Yorkshire Oaks, Dubai Sheema Classic
2008	Irving	g	Fighting Fifth Hurdle
2009	Torok	c	Anafartalar Stakes
2010	Solow	g	Dubai Turf, Prix d'Ispahan, Queen Anne Stakes, Sussex Stakes, Queen Elizabeth II Stakes

Singspiel was euthanised on 1 July 2010 at Newmarket Equine Hospital due to laminitis following an illness. Sheikh Mohammed's bloodstock advisor John Ferguson described him as "an outstandingly tough racehorse" who would be "sadly missed".

== Pedigree ==
Pedigree of Singspiel (IRE), bay stallion, 1992
Sire In The Wings (GB) 1986	Sadler's Wells (USA); 1981	Northern Dancer	Nearctic
Sire In The Wings (GB) 1986	Sadler's Wells (USA); 1981	Northern Dancer	Natalma
Sire In The Wings (GB) 1986	Sadler's Wells (USA); 1981	Fairy Bridge	Bold Reason
Sire In The Wings (GB) 1986	Sadler's Wells (USA); 1981	Fairy Bridge	Special
Sire In The Wings (GB) 1986	High Hawk (IRE); 1980	Shirley Heights	Mill Reef
Sire In The Wings (GB) 1986	High Hawk (IRE); 1980	Shirley Heights	Hardiemma
Sire In The Wings (GB) 1986	High Hawk (IRE); 1980	Sunbittern	Sea Hawk
Sire In The Wings (GB) 1986	High Hawk (IRE); 1980	Sunbittern	Pantoufle
Dam Glorious Song (CAN) 1976	Halo (USA); 1969	Hail To Reason	Turn-To
Dam Glorious Song (CAN) 1976	Halo (USA); 1969	Hail To Reason	Nothirdchance
Dam Glorious Song (CAN) 1976	Halo (USA); 1969	Cosmah	Cosmic Bomb
Dam Glorious Song (CAN) 1976	Halo (USA); 1969	Cosmah	Almahmoud
Dam Glorious Song (CAN) 1976	Ballade (USA); 1972	Herbager	Vandale
Dam Glorious Song (CAN) 1976	Ballade (USA); 1972	Herbager	Flagette
Dam Glorious Song (CAN) 1976	Ballade (USA); 1972	Miss Swapsco	Cohoes
Dam Glorious Song (CAN) 1976	Ballade (USA); 1972	Miss Swapsco	Soaring (Family: 12-c)
