= Almutawakel =

British-bred thoroughbred racehorse

- Sire: Machiavellian
- Grandsire: Mr. Prospector
- Dam: Elfaslah
- Damsire: Green Desert
- Sex: Stallion
- Foaled: 19 January 1995
- Country: Great Britain
- Colour: Bay
- Breeder: Shadwell Estates
- Owner: Hamdan bin Rashid Al Maktoum
- Trainer: Saeed bin Suroor
- Record: 19-4-4-1
- Earnings: $3,643,021

Major wins
- Prix Jean Prat (1998); Dubai World Cup (1999)

Almutawakel (foaled in 1995 in Great Britain, died in 2007) was a British thoroughbred racehorse sired by Machiavellian and the Irish stakes-winning Green Desert mare, Elfaslah.

== Racing career ==
Almutawakel's most prominent victory came in the 1999 Dubai World Cup. Going into the race at 44-1 and considered a heavy underdog, Almutawakel held his own and, with jockey Richard Hills at the helm, won the race by ¾ lengths. He beat out several prominent horses, such as Malek, Silver Charm, Daylami and Victory Gallop, winning the $3 million first place prize in the process. At the time, it was the first Dubai World Cup win for Sheikh Hamdan, who has since produced another winner, Invasor. He was also the first of seven wins at the Dubai World Cup for Godolphin Racing.

Prior to winning the Dubai World Cup, Almutawakel won the 1998 Prix Jean Prat at Chantilly. He also finished as the runner up in the 1998 Grand Prix de Paris. Almutawakel finished his racing career in the United States. In 2000, trained by Mark Hennig, he finished second in the Woodward Stakes and the Oaklawn Handicap and third in the Jockey Club Gold Cup. Almutawakel did not win a race after his first-place finish at the 1999 Dubai World Cup.

== Stud career ==
Almutawakel finished his career with a 4-4-1 in 19 career starts. Overall, he accumulated $3,643,021 in earnings. In 2007, after failing to respond to treatment for chronic arthritis, Almutawakel was euthanized in Ireland at Sheikh Hamdan's Derrinstown Stud. At the time his death, Almutawakel sired eight stakes winners for a grand total of $5,765,852 in earnings.

== Pedigree ==
Pedigree of Almutawakel (GB), bay stallion, 1995
Sire Machiavellian (USA) 1987	Mr. Prospector (USA); 1970	Raise A Native	Native Dancer
Sire Machiavellian (USA) 1987	Mr. Prospector (USA); 1970	Raise A Native	Raise You
Sire Machiavellian (USA) 1987	Mr. Prospector (USA); 1970	Gold Digger	Nashua
Sire Machiavellian (USA) 1987	Mr. Prospector (USA); 1970	Gold Digger	Sequence
Sire Machiavellian (USA) 1987	Coup de Folie (USA); 1982	Halo	Hail To Reason
Sire Machiavellian (USA) 1987	Coup de Folie (USA); 1982	Halo	Cosmah
Sire Machiavellian (USA) 1987	Coup de Folie (USA); 1982	Raise The Standard	Hoist The Flag
Sire Machiavellian (USA) 1987	Coup de Folie (USA); 1982	Raise The Standard	Natalma
Dam Elfaslah (IRE) 1988	Green Desert (USA); 1983	Danzig	Northern Dancer
Dam Elfaslah (IRE) 1988	Green Desert (USA); 1983	Danzig	Pas de Nom
Dam Elfaslah (IRE) 1988	Green Desert (USA); 1983	Foreign Courier	Sir Ivor
Dam Elfaslah (IRE) 1988	Green Desert (USA); 1983	Foreign Courier	Courtly Dee
Dam Elfaslah (IRE) 1988	Fair of the Furze (IRE); 1982	Ela-Mana-Mou	Pitcairn
Dam Elfaslah (IRE) 1988	Fair of the Furze (IRE); 1982	Ela-Mana-Mou	Rose Bertin
Dam Elfaslah (IRE) 1988	Fair of the Furze (IRE); 1982	Autocratic	Tyrant
Dam Elfaslah (IRE) 1988	Fair of the Furze (IRE); 1982	Autocratic	Flight Table (Family: 16-g)
