= Richard E. Mandella =

American horse trainer

Richard Mandella
Personal information
- Born: November 5, 1950 (age 75) Altadena, California
- Occupation: Trainer

Horse racing career
- Sport: Horse racing
- Career wins: 1,750+ (ongoing)

Major racing wins
- Bing Crosby Handicap (1978, 1994); Longacres Mile Handicap (1978); Hollywood Turf Cup Stakes (1982, 1999, 2006); Ancient Title Stakes (1990); Beverly D. Stakes (1990); Hawthorne Handicap (1992); Railbird Stakes; (1992, 1996, 1998, 2009); Santa Anita Oaks (1992, 2013); Clement L. Hirsch Turf Championship Stakes; (1993, 1994, 2002, 2006); Eddie Read Handicap (1993, 2001); Frank E. Kilroe Mile Handicap; (1993, 1997, 2003); Hollywood Futurity (1994, 2007); Strub Stakes (1995, 1999, 2005); Turf Classic Stakes (1995); United Nations Stakes (1995, 1996); Hollywood Gold Cup (1996, 1997); John C. Mabee Handicap (1996); Pacific Classic Stakes; (1996, 1997, 2004, 2015); Oaklawn Handicap (1997, 2002); Santa Anita Handicap (1997, 1998, 2005); Pimlico Special (1997); Ballerina Stakes (1998); Carter Handicap (1998); Metropolitan Handicap (1998); Donn Handicap (1999); Haskell Invitational Handicap (2000); Arcadia Handicap (2001); Goodwood Stakes (2002, 2003, 2005); Hollywood Derby (2002); Del Mar Futurity (2003, 2006); Arlington Million (2006); Robert B. Lewis Stakes (2008); Thunder Road Handicap (2009); Clement L. Hirsch Handicap (2015); Zenyatta Stakes; (2013, 2014, 2015, 2017); Breeders' Cup wins: Breeders' Cup Juvenile Fillies; (1993, 2003, 2012) Breeders' Cup Turf (1993, 2003); Breeders' Cup Classic (2003); Breeders' Cup Juvenile (2003); Breeders' Cup Distaff (2013, 2016); International wins: Dubai World Cup (2004)

Honors
- National Museum of Racing and Hall of Fame (2001)

Significant horses
- Action This Day, Beholder, Dare and Go, Gentlemen, Halfbridled, Johar, Kotashaan, Malek, Omaha Beach, Phone Chatter, Phone Trick, Pleasantly Perfect, Rock Hard Ten; Sandpit, The Tin Man, Siphon

Richard Eugene Mandella (born November 5, 1950, in Altadena, California), is a Thoroughbred horse trainer and a member of the U.S. Racing Hall of Fame.

Mandella's father, a blacksmith, introduced him to horses at an early age and while still in high school he began starting and training horses at a nearby ranch. He spent a year in New York as assistant to Lefty Nickerson and then took a job with Texas horseman Roger Braugh in 1974.

Two years later, Mandella returned to California and opened his own stable. His wins began almost immediately with Bad 'n Big and continued with Phone Trick, Dare and Go, and Pleasantly Perfect. Between 1996 and 1998, Mandella won six straight million dollar races in Southern California with Dare and Go, Siphon, Gentlemen, and Malek. He has started six horses in the Kentucky Derby.

Mandella was inducted into the U.S. Racing Hall of Fame in 2001, and in 2003 he had four winners in the Breeders' Cup: Pleasantly Perfect, Johar, Halfbridled, and Action This Day.

In 2006, Mandella wrote the introduction to Santa Anita Morning Rhapsody, by photographer-author Karen S. Davis, a book documenting morning thoroughbred racetrack training. "Most people who enjoy racing don't realize how special these early hours are, watching ... the relationship between horse and man," he wrote.

In 2019, he ended his 13-year drought for stakes races outside of California. After remaining winless outside of his home state since winning the Arlington Million in 2006, Mandella captured the Rebel Stakes and Arkansas Derby with Omaha Beach.

Mandella lives in Bradbury, California, with his wife Randi, son Gary (also a trainer), and daughter Andrea.
