= Nad Al Sheba Racecourse =

Racecourse in Dubai, United Arab Emirates

Coordinates: 25°9′43.02″N 55°18′37.82″E

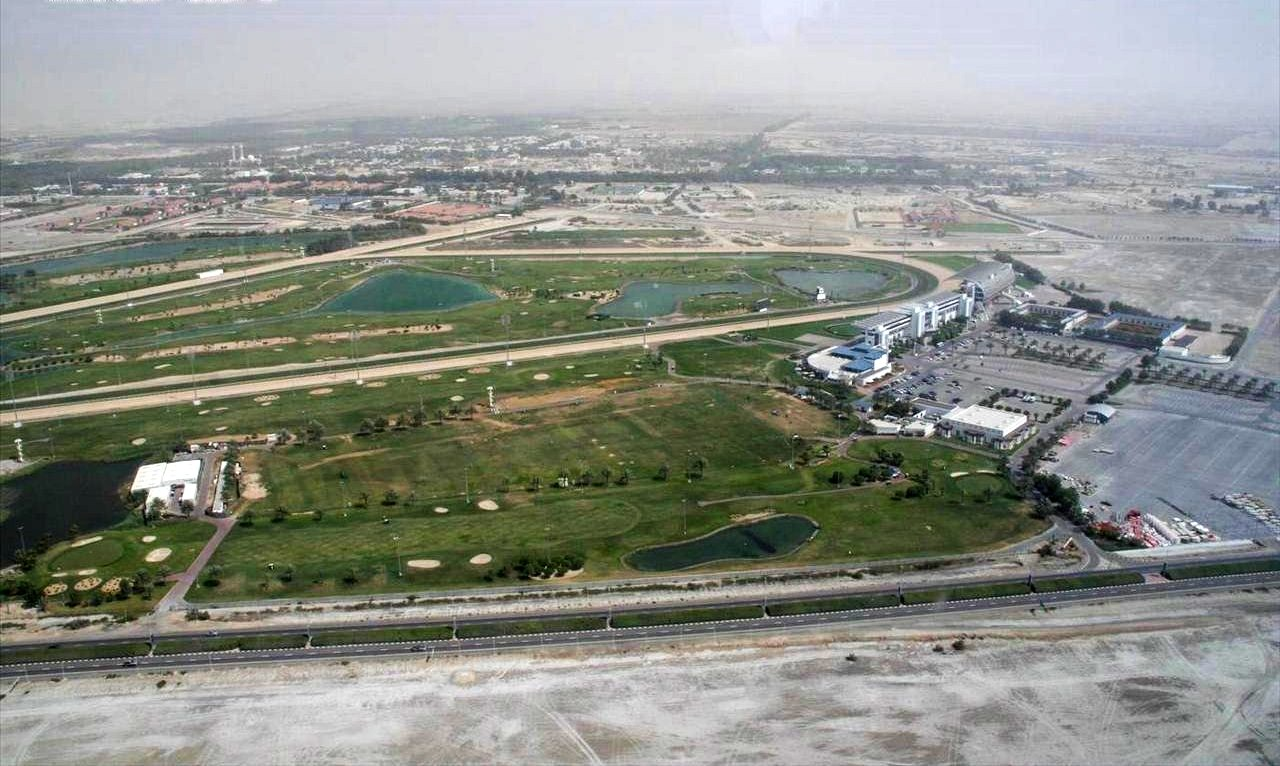
- Nad Al Sheba as seen from the air on 1 May 2007
- Interactive map of Nad Al Sheba Racecourse
- Location: Dubai
- Owned by: Dubai Racing Club
- Date opened: 1986
- Date closed: 2009
- Course type: Flat
- Notable races: Dubai World Cup

Nad Al Sheba Racecourse was a Thoroughbred horse racing facility in Dubai, United Arab Emirates opened in 1986. It had a 2,200 m left-handed dirt race track and a left-handed turf course of the same distance. It operated from November through March and featured the Dubai International Racing Carnival and its Dubai World Cup Night.

Nad Al Sheba Racecourse was demolished in 2009 following hosting the Dubai World Cup race, being replaced by Meydan Racecourse on the same site.

== History ==
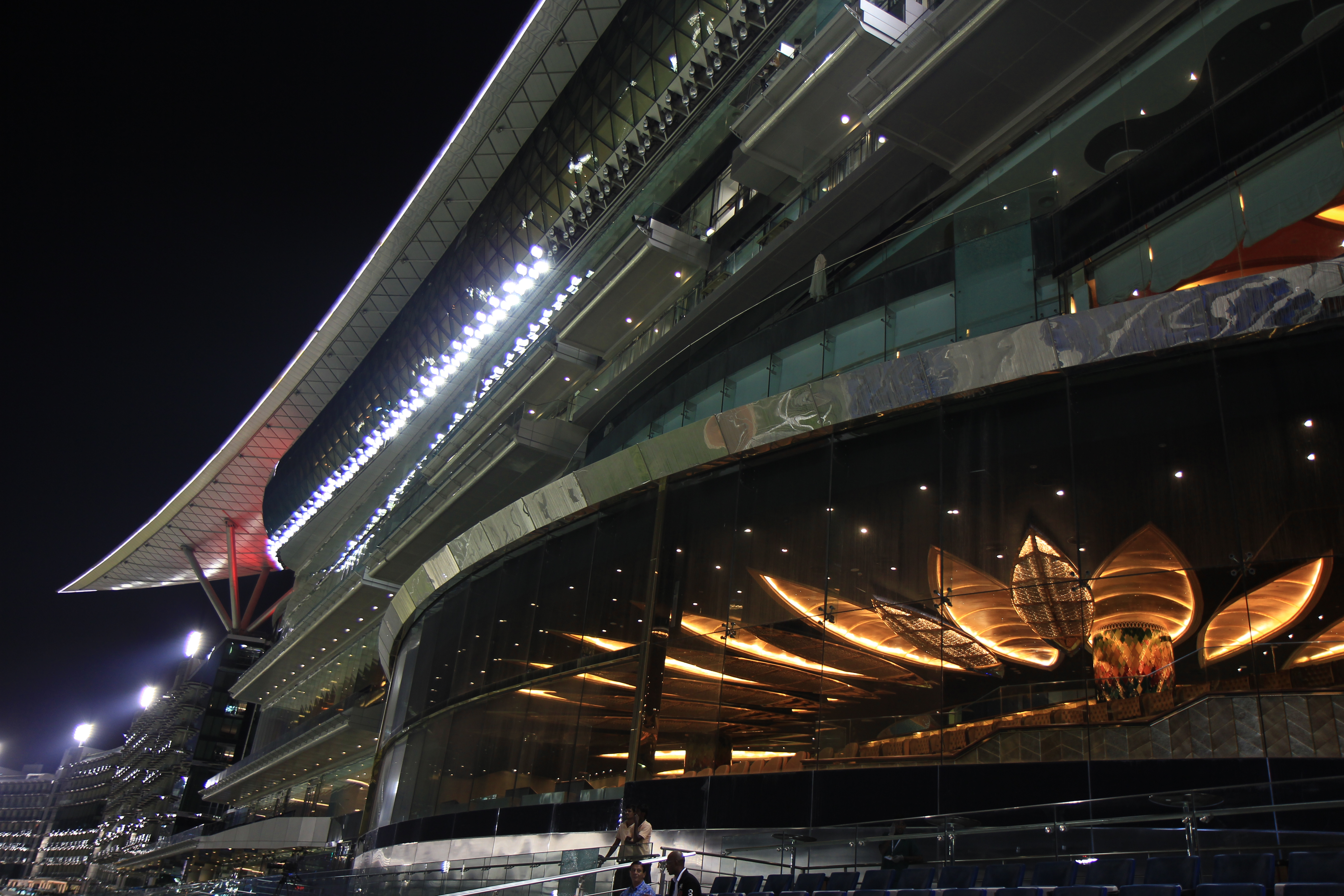
Meydan Racecourse, Nad Al Sheba, Dubai

Horse racing began in Dubai as early as 1981, and in 1986 Nad Al Sheba Racecourse was formally opened. The course also featured a golf course in the centre.

In 1992, Sheikh Mohammed bin Rashid Al Maktoum formed the Dubai Racing Club to increase the popularity of the sport in the city, and later in 1993 the Dubai Racing Club hosted the inaugural Dubai International Jockeys Challenge at Nad Al Sheba. In 1996, the Dubai World Cup was created with the horses competing for a prize of $4million. This was a significant prize purse for the era. The first Dubai World Cup was won by Cigar. Today the race day is worth a total prize purse in excess of $30million.

In 2000, the Godolphin owned Dubai Millennium won the world cup race with a record time of 1.59.50. In 2001, the Millennium Grandstand was opened. In 2007, it was announced that Meydan Racecourse would replace Nad Al Sheba. For the following two years, the new grandstands were visible under construction. Following the 2009 Dubai World Cup, Nad Al Sheba racecourse was demolished and now sits as part of the Meydan Racecourse facility.

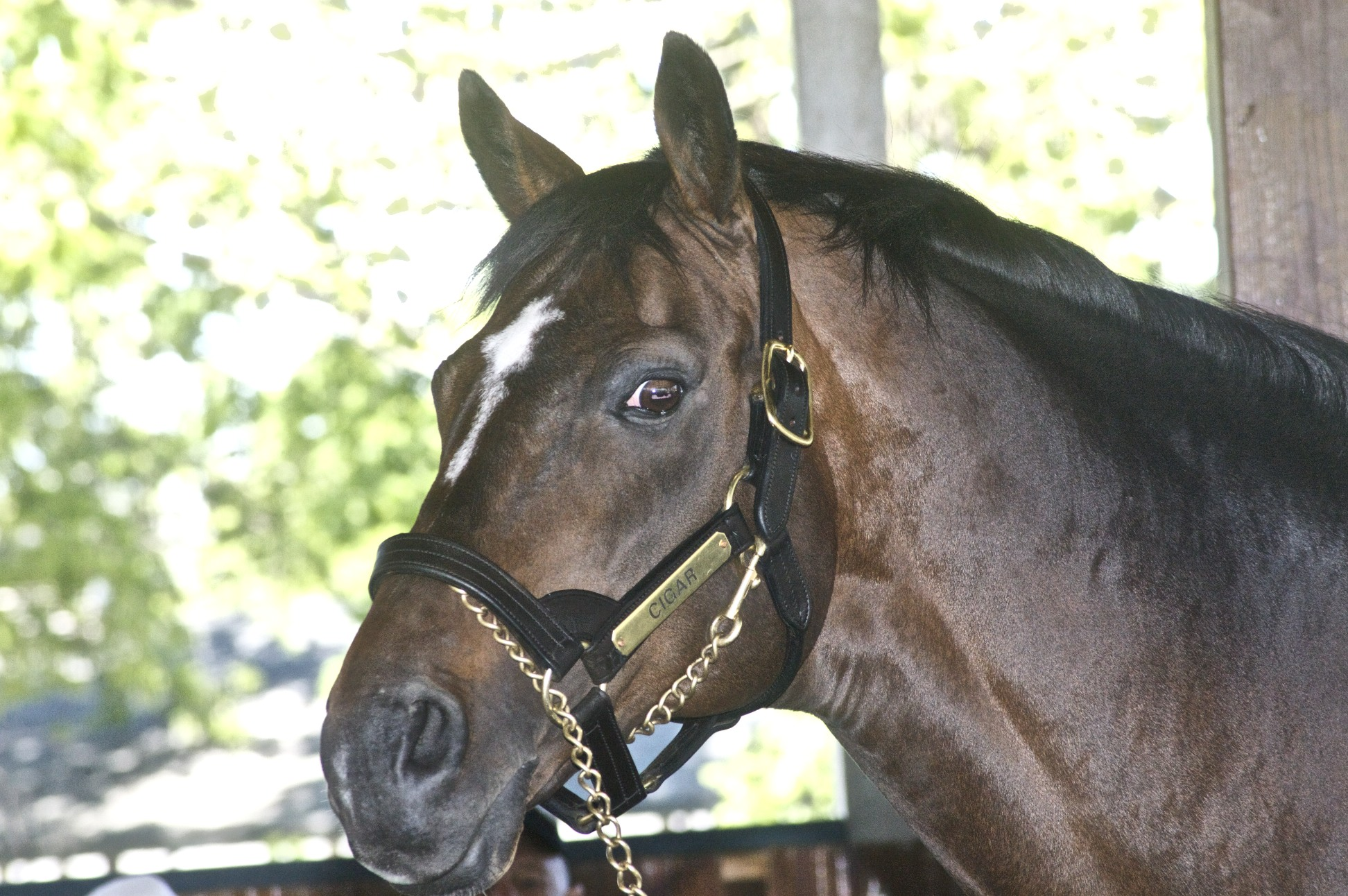
Cigar - the winner of the first Dubai World Cup race at Nad Al Sheba

The last winner at Nad Al Sheba was Well Armed.

== Group 1 Races ==
Race Name	Type	Surface	Distance
Dubai World Cup	Flat	Dirt	1m 2f
Dubai Sheema Classic	Flat	Turf	1m 4f
Dubai Turf	Flat	Turf	1m 194yds
Dubai Golden Shaheen	Flat	Dirt	6f

== Records ==
At the time of closure, the following records were held:

- Top Jockey - Frankie Dettori (132 wins)
- Top Trainer - Saeed Bin Suroor (213 wins)
- Top Owner - Godolphin (142 wins)

== Non Racing Events ==
Nad Al Sheba featured a golf club, which was designed in 1993 by Karl Litten. It was an 18 hole links style course, 6503 yards in length and had a par of 71. The copurse was closed in May 2007 to make way for the Meydan Racecourse development. At the time it had around 1200 members.

Two major concerts took place at Nad Al Sheba. On February 14, 2004 Whitney Houston performed as part of her Prior to Soul Divas Tour. In April 2006, Robbie Williams performed a concert at Nad Al Sheba as part of his Close Encounters World Tour.
