= Saudi Cup Night =

Series of horse races in Riyadh, Saudi Arabia

Saudi Cup Night is a series of eight thoroughbred horse races and one Purebred Arabian race held annually at King Abdulaziz Racetrack in Riyadh, Saudi Arabia. It was first established in 2020.

Run under the auspices of the Saudi Arabia Jockey Club, the event currently offers purses totalling US$33.5 million (as of 2024) and is the single richest day of Thoroughbred racing in the world. The Saudi Cup Night includes the following races:

- Jockey Club Local Handicap (Local bred, locally trained horses only)
- Obaiya Arabian Classic GI (for purebred Arabians)
- Saudi International Handicap 90–110
- Saudi Derby GIII
- Riyadh Dirt Sprint GII
- 1351 Turf Sprint GII
- Neom Turf Cup GI
- Red Sea Turf Handicap GII
- Saudi Cup GI

The festival is accompanied by cultural events in partnership with the Ministry of Culture, Saudi heritage fashion expert Dr. Laila Albassam, and illustrator Norah Sahman – who co-developed the Saudi Cup Dress Code. Attendees dress in styles inspired by the heritage costumes worn across the Kingdom. The event also offers traditional foods, live musical concerts, art shows, and performances from various parts of Saudi Arabia.

Due to Ramadan restriction, 2026 & 2027 edition are moved to mid February.

== History ==
=== 2020 ===
The first edition of the Saudi Cup Night was first held on February 29, 2020, with the following races: $800,000 Samba Saudi Derby, $1.5 million Saudi Cup Sprint, $2.5 million Longines Turf Handicap, $1 million Mohamed Yousuf Naghi Motors Cup, $1 million stc 1351 Turf Sprint, $20 million Saudi Cup won by Maximum Security.

=== 2021 ===
The second edition was held on February 20, 2021. All of the races from 2020 were renewed but some were renamed and purses increased which were the following: $1.5 million Saudi Derby, $1.5 million Riyadh Dirt Sprint, $2.5 million Red Sea Turf, $1 million Neom Cup Turf. Mishriff won the Saudi Cup in this meeting, becoming the first European-bred, European-trained horse to win the race.

=== 2022 ===
The third edition saw the first time a locally trained horse, Emblem Road, win the Saudi Cup. The following races were internationally rated by the International Federation of Horseracing Authorities: Saudi Derby, Riyadh Dirt Sprint, 1351 Turf Sprint, Neom Turf Cup, Red Sea Turf Handicap, were all rated Grade 3; while the main race, the Saudi Cup, was given the rating of Grade 1. Prize money was also increased to $1.5 million for Neom Turf Cup and 1351 Turf Sprint. This edition saw a new Guinness World Record being set, with the most expensive single-horse race being held with prize money exceeding 75 million Saudi riyals.

=== 2023 ===
The fourth edition saw the Japanese winning their first Saudi Cup title with Panthalassa. This edition saw a locally trained horse, Commissioner King, win the Saudi Derby for the first time.

=== 2024 ===
The fifth edition saw the promotion of Neom Cup Turf and 1351 Turf Sprint to Grade 2, increasing the prize money to $2 million. Senor Buscador won the Saudi Cup, setting a new record time of 1:49.50.

=== 2025 ===
The sixth edition saw the Japanese enjoying many wins, with Shin Emperor, Ascoli Piceno, and Byzantine Dream each winning the Neom Turf Cup, 1351 Turf Sprint, and the Red Sea Turf Handicap respectively, before Forever Young winning the Japanese their second Saudi Cup win after chasing down and overtaking Hong Kong challenger Romantic Warrior on the final stretch.

=== 2026 ===
The seventh edition will see the second promotion of the Neom Cup Turf in two years, now to Grade 1, increasing the prize to $3 million.

== See also ==
- Horses in Saudi Arabia
