= 2022 Saudi Cup =

Third running of the Saudi Cup horse race

- Saudi Cup
- Location: King Abdulaziz Racetrack; Riyadh, Saudi Arabia
- Date: 26 February 2022
- Distance: 1,800 metres (about 9 furlongs)
- Winning horse: Emblem Road
- Winning time: 1:50.52
- Jockey: Wigberto Ramos
- Trainer: Mitab Almulawah
- Owner: Prince Saud bin Salman Abdulaziz
- Conditions: Fast
- Surface: Dirt

The 2022 Saudi Cup was a horse race that took place at King Abdulaziz Racetrack in Riyadh on 26 February 2022. It was the third running of the race, and the first after it was promoted to Group 1 status. The total prize money for the race was $20 million, with the winner receiving $10 million, making it the world's most valuable horse race at the time of running.

The race was won by outsider Emblem Road, ridden by Panamanian jockey Wigberto Ramos and trained locally in Saudi Arabia by Mitab Almulawah.

== Race ==
=== Entries ===
A maximum field of 14 runners was declared for the race, including 2021 Saudi Cup winner Mishriff. Other notable entries included Kentucky Derby winner Mandaloun, Champions Cup winner T O Keynes, Woodward Stakes winner Art Collector, Breeders' Cup Distaff winner Marche Lorraine, and Champion Stakes winner Sealiway.

=== Result ===
Placed horses

1: Emblem Road

2: Country Grammer

3: Midnight Bourbon

Position	Margin	Horse	Jockey	Trainer	Prize
1		Emblem Road	Wigberto Ramos	Mitab Almulawah	$10,000,000
2	½	Country Grammer	Flavien Prat	Bob Baffert	$3,500,000
3	1½	Midnight Bourbon	Joel Rosario	Steve Asmussen	$2,000,000
4	3	Making Miracles	Alexis Moreno	Mitab Almulawah	$1,500,000
5	1¼	Aero Trem	Vagner Leal	Antonio Pereira	$1,000,000
6	6½	Marche Lorraine	Christophe Soumillon	Yoshito Yahagi	$600,000
7	¾	Secret Ambition	Adrie de Vries	Bhupat Seemar	$500,000
8	1	T O Keynes	Kohei Matsuyama	Daisuke Takayanagi	$400,000
9	4¼	Mandaloun	Florent Geroux	Brad H. Cox	$300,000
10	¾	Magny Cours	Mickael Barzalona	André Fabre	$200,000
11	hd	Real World	Frankie Dettori	Saeed bin Suroor	
12	½	Art Collector	Luis Saez	William I. Mott	
13	dist	Sealiway	Ryan Moore	Francis-Henri Graffard	
14	dist	Mishriff	David Egan	John & Thady Gosden	
