= 2023 Saudi Cup =

Fourth running of the Saudi Cup horse race

- Saudi Cup
- Location: King Abdulaziz Racetrack; Riyadh, Saudi Arabia
- Date: 25 February 2023
- Distance: 1,800 metres (about 9 furlongs)
- Winning horse: Panthalassa
- Winning time: 1:50.79
- Jockey: Yutaka Yoshida
- Trainer: Yoshito Yahagi
- Owner: Hiroo Race Co., Ltd.
- Conditions: Fast
- Surface: Dirt

The 2023 Saudi Cup was a horse race that took place at King Abdulaziz Racetrack in Riyadh on 25 February 2023. It was the fourth running of the race, and the second after it was promoted to Group 1 status. The total prize money for the race was $20 million, with the winner receiving $10 million.

The race was won by Panthalassa, ridden by Japanese jockey Yutaka Yoshida.

== Race ==
=== Entries ===
A maximum field of 13 runners was declared for the race, including 2022 Saudi Cup winner Emblem Road. Other notable entries included the 2022 Malibu Stakes winner Taiba.

=== Result ===
Placed horses

1: Panthalassa

2: Country Grammer

3: Cafe Pharoah

Position	Margin	Horse	Jockey	Trainer	Prize
1		Panthalassa	Yutaka Yoshida	Yoshito Yahagi	$10,000,000
2	¾	Country Grammer	Frankie Dettori	Bob Baffert	$3,500,000
3	½	Cafe Pharoah	João Moreira	Noriyuki Hori	$2,000,000
4	hd	Geoglyph	Christophe Lemaire	Tetsuya Kimura	$1,500,000
5	1	Crown Pride	Damian Lane	Koichi Shintani	$1,000,000
6	1¾	Emblem Road	Alexis Moreno	Moutaib Almulawah	$600,000
7	3¼	Jun Light Bolt	Ryan Moore	Yasuo Tomomichi	$500,000
8	hd	Taiba	Mike E. Smith	Bob Baffert	$400,000
9	nk	Remorse	Tadhg O'Shea	B Seemar	$300,000
10	4	Lagertha Rhyme	Ricardo Ferreira	Naif Almandeel	$200,000
11	6	Vin De Garde	Mickael Barzalona	Hideaki Fujiwara	
12	6	Sunset Flash	A Alsarhani	Naif Almandeel	
13	5½	Scotland Yard	Victor Gutierrez	Moutaib Almulawah	

== See also ==
- 2023 Dubai World Cup
