= Mostahdaf =

British-bred Thoroughbred racehorse

- Racing colours of Hamdan Al Maktoum
- Sire: Frankel
- Grandsire: Galileo
- Dam: Handassa
- Damsire: Dubawi
- Sex: Stallion
- Foaled: 4 May 2018
- Country: Ireland
- Colour: Dark Bay
- Breeder: Shadwell Stud
- Owner: Shadwell Stud
- Trainer: John Gosden and Thady Gosden
- Record: 17:10-2-0
- Earnings: $3,040,193

Major wins
- Darley Stakes (2021); Gordon Richards Stakes (2022); September Stakes (2022); Neom Turf Cup (2023); Prince of Wales's Stakes (2023); Juddmonte International Stakes (2023)

Awards
- Cartier Champion Older Horse (2023)
- Last updated on 1 June 2026

Mostahdaf (foaled 4 May 2018) is retired thoroughbred racehorse. In 2023, he won the Neom Turf Cup, the Prince of Wales's Stakes at Royal Ascot, and the International Stakes. Also the 2023 Cartier Champion Older Horse.

== Background ==
Mostahdaf was bred and owned by Shadwell Stud. He was trained by John & Thady Gosden. Sired by the Champion racehorse Frankel out of mare Handassa.
Mostahdaf did not race as a two-year-old but quickly built a formidable record, won five of his first six starts at three-year-old included the Group 3 race Darley Stakes. 2023 was his successful year, won 3 out of 5 races, including the Group 3 Neom Turf Cup and back-to-back Group 1 win at Prince of Wales's Stakes & Juddmonte International Stakes and championed as 2023 Cartier Champion Older Horse.

== Statistics ==
The following racing form is based on information available on racingpost.com.

Date	Distance	Race	Class	Course	Field	Finish	Time (Note: Official time of winning horse. The time written in grey doesn't belong to Mostahdaf.)	Winning (Losing) Margin	Winner (2nd place)	Jockey
2021– three-year-old season
16 Mar	1,400 meters	Bombardier Novice Stakes	AWC5	Newcastle	13	1st	1m 27.47s	4 1/2 lengths	(Ego Trip)	Robert Havlin
05 Apr	1,600 meters	Conditions Stakes	AWC2	Kempton	5	1st	1m 38.15s	1/2 lengths	(Imperial Sands)	Robert Havlin
20 May	1,600 meters	Heron Stakes	Listed	Sandown	7	1st	1m 50.29s	1/2 lengths	(Highland Avenue)	Jim Crowley
15 Jun	1,600 meters	St James's Palace Stakes	GI	Ascot	13	12th	1m 37.40s	(17 1/4 lengths)	Poetic Flare	Jim Crowley
15 Sep	1,600 meters	Fortune Stakes	Listed	Sandown	7	1st	1m 47.24s	1/2 lengths	(Escobar)	Jim Crowley
09 Oct	1,800 meters	Darley Stakes	GIII	Newmarket	10	1st	1m 52.03s	1 3/4 lengths	(Bedouin's Story)	Jim Crowley
2022– four-year-old season
22 Apr	2,000 meters	Gordon Richards Stakes	GIII	Sandown	3	1st	2m 12.59s	1 1/2 lengths	(Foxes Tales)	Jim Crowley
26 May	2,000 meters	Brigadier Gerard Stakes	GIII	Sandown	5	2nd	2m 8.10s	(5 lengths)	Bay Bridge	Jim Crowley
18 Jun	2,400 meters	Hardwicke Stakes	GII	Ascot	7	2nd	2m 30.07s	(3 1/4 lengths)	Broome	Jim Crowley
07 Jul	2,400 meters	Princess of Wales's Stakes	GII	Newmarket	6	6th	2m 28.91s	(13 1/4 lengths)	Yibir	Jim Crowley
03 Sep	2,400 meters	September Stakes	GIII	Kempton	8	1st	2m 34.44s	2 3/4 lengths	(Dubai Honour)	Dane O'Neill
03 Oct	2,400 meters	Prix de l'Arc de Triomphe	GI	Longchamp	20	20th	2m 35.71s	(43 lengths)	Alpinista	Jim Crowley
2023– five-year-old season
25 Feb	2,100 meters	Neom Turf Cup	GIII	Riyadh	10	1st	2m 6.23s	7 lengths	(Dubai Honour)	Jim Crowley
25 Mar	2,400 meters	Dubai Sheema Classic	GI	Meydan	10	4th	2m 25.65s	(7 lengths)	Equinox	Jim Crowley
21 Jun	2,000 meters	Prince of Wales's Stakes	GI	Ascot	6	1st	2m 5.95s	4 lengths	(Luxembourg)	Jim Crowley
23 Aug	2,000 meters	International Stakes	GI	York	4	1st	2m 6.40s	1 lengths	(Nashwa)	Frankie Dettori
04 Nov	2,400 meters	Breeders' Cup Turf	GI	Santa Anita	11	8th	2m 24.30s	(6 lengths)	Auguste Rodin	Jim Crowley
