= Elite Power =

American Thoroughbred Racehorse

- Sire: Curlin
- Grandsire: Smart Strike
- Dam: Broadway's Alibi
- Damsire: Vindication
- Sex: Colt
- Foaled: February 7, 2018
- Country: United States
- Colour: Chestnut
- Owner: Juddmonte
- Trainer: William I. Mott
- Record: 13: 9-1-1
- Earnings: US$3,775,711

Major wins
- Vosburgh Stakes (2022); Riyadh Dirt Sprint (2023); True North Stakes (2023); Alfred G. Vanderbilt Handicap (2023); Breeders' Cup; Breeders' Cup Sprint (2022, 2023)

Awards
- American Champion Sprint Horse (2022, 2023)

Honours
- Grade III Elite Power Stakes at Aqueduct Racetrack (2025– )
- Last updated on 18 November 2025

Elite Power (foaled February 7, 2018) is a retired Champion American Thoroughbred racehorse who the Grade I Breeders' Cup Sprint at Keeneland, and the Grade II Vosburgh Stakes in 2022. Elite Power was awarded an Eclipse Award as American Champion Sprint Horse in 2022 and in 2023. In 2023 Elite Power repeated winning the Breeders' Cup Sprint at Santa Anita Park.

== Background ==
Elite Power is a chestnut colt that was bred in Kentucky by Alpha Delta Stables. His sire is Curlin, the 2007 and 2008 American Horse of the Year and stands at Hill 'n' Dale Farms and his dam is Broadway's Alibi was a stakes winner a multiple graded stakes winner who finished second, beaten less than a length, to Believe You Can in the 2012 Kentucky Oaks. The following year Alpha Delta purchased her for $2.15 million at the Keeneland November sale of breeding stock.

Elite Power was purchased by Juddmonte Farms for US$900,000 at the 2019 Keeneland September yearling sale.

Elite Power was trained by U.S. Racing Hall of Fame trainer William I. Mott.

On October 24, 2023, Juddmonte Farms announced that after the Breeders' Cup Sprint of that year (of which he ultimately won), the horse will be retired to stud for a service fee of US$50,000.

After a successful campaign in 2023 Elite Power was awarded an Eclipse Award as the U.S. Champion Sprint Horse for the second time.

== Statistics ==
Date	Distance	Race	Grade	Track	Odds	Field	Finish	Winning Time	Winning (Losing) Margin	Jockey	Ref
2021 – Three-year-old season
Sep 25, 2021	6 furlongs	Maiden Special Weight		Churchill Downs	8.30	8	6	1:08.68	(14 3/4 lengths)	Martin Garcia	
Nov 24, 2021	1 mile	Maiden Special Weight		Churchill Downs	5.00	11	4	1:35.26	(3 3/4 lengths)	Joel Rosario	
2022 – Four-year-old season
May 7, 2022	6 furlongs	Maiden Special Weight		Churchill Downs	7.90	11	3	1:08.71	(4 3/4 lengths)	Joel Rosario	
Jun 5, 2022	7 furlongs	Maiden Special Weight		Churchill Downs	3.00	11	1	1:21.06	9 lengths	James Graham	
Jun 30, 2022	1 mile	Allowance		Churchill Downs	0.60*	9	1	1:34.19	3 1/4 lengths	James Graham	
Sep 3, 2022	6 furlongs	Allowance		Saratoga	1.10*	9	1	1:09.06	3 1/2 lengths	Joel Rosario	
Oct 8, 2022	7 furlongs	Vosburgh Stakes	II	Aqueduct	0.50*	5	1	1:23.98	5 3/4 lengths	Irad Ortiz Jr.	
Nov 5, 2022	6 furlongs	Breeders' Cup Sprint	I	Keeneland	5.55	11	1	1:09.11	1 1/4 lengths	Irad Ortiz Jr.	
2023 – Five-year-old season
Feb 25, 2023	1200 metres	Riyadh Dirt Sprint	III	King Abdulaziz Racetrack	N/A (Note: Wagering is not allowed in Saudi Arabia. In British wagering, Elite Power was the 7/4 favorite.)	9	1	1:11.01	3 1/4 lengths	Frankie Dettori	
Jun 10, 2023	6 1/2 furlongs	True North Stakes	II	Belmont Park	0.75*	6	1	1:15.65	1 3/4 lengths	Irad Ortiz Jr.	
Jul 29, 2023	6 furlongs	Alfred G. Vanderbilt Handicap	I	Saratoga	1.10*	7	1	1:09.22	head	Irad Ortiz Jr.	
Aug 26, 2023	7 furlongs	Forego Stakes	I	Saratoga	0.75*	5	2	1:21.53	(1 3/4 lengths)	Irad Ortiz Jr.	
Nov 4, 2023	6 furlongs	Breeders' Cup Sprint	I	Santa Anita	1.70*	8	1	1:08.34	1 1/2 lengths	Irad Ortiz Jr.	

Notes:
An (*) asterisk after the odds means Elite Power was the post-time favorite.

== Pedigree ==
Pedigree of Elite Power, chestnut colt, 7 February 2018
Sire Curlin (2004)	Smart Strike (1992)	Mr. Prospector (1970)	Raise A Native (1961)
Sire Curlin (2004)	Smart Strike (1992)	Mr. Prospector (1970)	Gold Digger (1962)
Sire Curlin (2004)	Smart Strike (1992)	Classy 'n Smart (1981)	Smarten (1976)
Sire Curlin (2004)	Smart Strike (1992)	Classy 'n Smart (1981)	No Class (CAN) (1974)
Sire Curlin (2004)	Sherriff's Deputy (1994)	Deputy Minister (CAN) (1979)	Vice Regent (CAN) (1967)
Sire Curlin (2004)	Sherriff's Deputy (1994)	Deputy Minister (CAN) (1979)	Mint Copy (CAN) (1970)
Sire Curlin (2004)	Sherriff's Deputy (1994)	Barbarika (1985)	Bates Motel (1979)
Sire Curlin (2004)	Sherriff's Deputy (1994)	Barbarika (1985)	War Exchange(1972)
Dam Broadway's Alibi (2009)	Vindication (2000)	Seattle Slew (1974)	Bold Reasoning (1968)
Dam Broadway's Alibi (2009)	Vindication (2000)	Seattle Slew (1974)	My Charmer (1969)
Dam Broadway's Alibi (2009)	Vindication (2000)	Strawberry Reason (1992)	Strawberry Road (AUS) (1979)
Dam Broadway's Alibi (2009)	Vindication (2000)	Strawberry Reason (1992)	Pretty Reason (1971)
Dam Broadway's Alibi (2009)	Broadway Gold (2002)	Seeking The Gold (1985)	Mr. Prospector (1970)
Dam Broadway's Alibi (2009)	Broadway Gold (2002)	Seeking The Gold (1985)	Con Game (1974)
Dam Broadway's Alibi (2009)	Broadway Gold (2002)	Miss Doolittle (1998)	Storm Cat (1983)
Dam Broadway's Alibi (2009)	Broadway Gold (2002)	Miss Doolittle (1998)	Eliza (1990) (family 37)
