= 2023 Dubai World Cup =

Horse race

- Dubai World Cup
- Location: Meydan Racecourse; Dubai, United Arab Emirates
- Date: 25 March 2023
- Distance: 2,000 metres (about 10 furlongs)
- Surface: Dirt

The 2023 Dubai World Cup was a horse race run at Meydan Racecourse in Dubai on 25 March 2023. It was the 27th running of the race. The total prize money for the race is $12 million, with the winner receiving $7.2 million.

== Result ==
Position	Margin	Horse	Jockey	Trainer	Prize
1		Ushba Tesoro	Yuga Kawada	Noboru Takagi	
2	2¾	Algiers	James Doyle	Simon & Ed Crisford	
3	sh	Emblem Road	Adel Al Furaydi	Ahmad Abdulwahid	
4	¼	T O Keynes	Oisin Murphy	Daisuke Takayanagi	
5	4	Crown Pride	Damian Lane	Koichi Shintani	
6	1½	Bendoog	Christophe Soumillon	Bhupat Seemar	
7	4¾	Country Grammer	Lanfranco Dettori	Bob Baffert	
8	1¾	Salute The Soldier	Adrie de Vries	Fawzi Nass	
9	3¾	Remorse	Tadhg O'Shea	Bhupat Seemar	
10	2¼	Panthalassa	Yutaka Yoshida	Yoshito Yahagi	
11	10¼	Geoglyph	Christophe Lemaire	Tetsuya Kimura	
12	26	Cafe Pharoah	João Moreira	Noriyuki Hori	
13	½	Vela Azul	Cristian Demuro	Kunihiko Watanabe	
14	½	Super Corinto	Hector Isaac Berrios	Amador Sanchez	
15	23	Jun Light Bolt	Ryan Moore	Yasuo Tomomichi	

== See also ==
- 2023 Saudi Cup
