= Mkfancy =

French-bred racehorse

- Racing silks of Abdullah Al Maddah
- Sire: Makfi
- Grandsire: Dubawi
- Dam: Fancy Green
- Damsire: Muhtathir
- Sex: Stallion
- Foaled: 28 January 2017
- Country: France
- Colour: Bay
- Breeder: Marbat LLC
- Owner: Abdullah Al Maddah
- Trainer: Pia Brandt
- Record: 7: 2-1-1
- Earnings: £155,437

Major wins
- Critérium de Saint-Cloud (2019)

Mkfancy (foaled 28 January 2017) is a French Thoroughbred racehorse. He was one of the best French juveniles of 2019 when he won two of his three races including the Group 1 Critérium de Saint-Cloud.

== Background ==
Mkfancy is a bay stallion with no white markings bred in France by Marbat LLC, the breeding company of his owner Abdullah Al Maddah. He was sent into training with the Swedish-born Pia Brandt at Chantilly in France.

He was from the sixth crop of foals sired by Makfi, who won the 2000 Guineas and the Prix Jacques Le Marois in 2010. Makfi's other foals have included Make Believe in Europe and the top-class Australasian winners Marky Mark (Manawatu Sires Produce Stakes), Sofia Rose (Australian Oaks) and Bonneval (Underwood Stakes).

Mkfancy's dam Fancy Green showed little racing ability, finishing second on her debut but running unplaced in three subsequent starts. She was a great-granddaughter of the British broodmare Martingale (foaled 1975, and a half-sister to Madelia) who produced the Group 1 winners Mersey (Prix Royal Oak) and Muncie (Prix Saint-Alary).

== Racing career ==
=== 2019: two-year-old season ===
Mkfancy made his debut in an event for previously unraced juveniles over 1600 metres at Longchamp Racecourse on 1 September when he was ridden by Theo Bachelot. Starting at odds of 13/1 in an eleven-runner field he came home third behind Victor Ludorum and Twist, beaten five and a quarter lengths from Twist by the winner. Maxime Guyon took the ride when the colt contested a maiden race on very soft ground at Saint-Cloud Racecourse 26 days later and recorded his first success as he won by three lengths from thirteen opponents at odds of 3.1/1.

Bachelot was back in the saddle when Mkfancy was stepped up in class and distance for the Group 1 Critérium de Saint-Cloud over 2000 metres on heavy ground on 26 October. He started the 5.3/1 third favourite behind The Summit (third in the Prix de Condé), while the other six runners included Mythical, Arthur's Kingdom and Celtic High King from Ireland and Sound of Cannons and Via de Vega from England. With no previous Group or Listed winners in the field the race appeared to be a sub-standard one by Group 1 standards. Mkfancy led from the start, fought off a challenge from Mythical 300 metres from the finish and kept on well in the closing stages to win by three lengths from Arthur's Kingdom. After the race Pia Brandt said "He's homebred, and it's a great feeling. We thought there was going to be a stronger pace, but he did all the work himself and Theo had confidence in the horse".

In the official rating of European two-year-olds for 2019, Mkfancy given a rating of 112, making him the third-best French juvenile behind Earthlight and Victor Ludorum.

=== 2020: three-year-old season ===
Mkfancy began his second campaign in the Listed Prix Maurice Caillault over 1800 metres on the synthetic Polytrack surface at Saint-Cloud on 9 March in which he finished second of the six runners, beaten a length by the favourite Waltham. Racing in France was then disrupted by the COVID-19 pandemic and Mkfancy did not reappear until 6 June when he contested the 2200 metre Prix Greffulhe which was run that year at Lyon-Parilly Racecourse. He started joint-favourite but after leading for most of the way he weakened badly after being overtaken and bumped 200 metres from the finish and came home last of the twelve runners. After a break of more than three months he returned to the track on 23 September and finished fifth behind Algiers in the Listed Prix Turenne over 2400 metres at Saint-Cloud.

== Pedigree ==
Pedigree of Mkfancy (FR), bay colt, 2017
Sire Makfi (GB) 2007	Dubawi (IRE); 2002	Dubai Millennium (GB)	Seeking The Gold (USA)
Sire Makfi (GB) 2007	Dubawi (IRE); 2002	Dubai Millennium (GB)	Colorado Dancer (IRE)
Sire Makfi (GB) 2007	Dubawi (IRE); 2002	Zomaradah (GB)	Deploy
Sire Makfi (GB) 2007	Dubawi (IRE); 2002	Zomaradah (GB)	Jawaher (IRE)
Sire Makfi (GB) 2007	Dhelaal (GB); 2002	Green Desert (USA)	Danzig
Sire Makfi (GB) 2007	Dhelaal (GB); 2002	Green Desert (USA)	Foreign Courier
Sire Makfi (GB) 2007	Dhelaal (GB); 2002	Irish Valley (USA)	Irish River (FR)
Sire Makfi (GB) 2007	Dhelaal (GB); 2002	Irish Valley (USA)	Green Valley (FR)
Dam Fancy Green (FR) 2010	Muhtathir (GB); 1995	Elmaamul (USA)	Diesis (GB)
Dam Fancy Green (FR) 2010	Muhtathir (GB); 1995	Elmaamul (USA)	Modena
Dam Fancy Green (FR) 2010	Muhtathir (GB); 1995	Majmu (USA)	Al Nasr (FR)
Dam Fancy Green (FR) 2010	Muhtathir (GB); 1995	Majmu (USA)	Affirmative Fable
Dam Fancy Green (FR) 2010	Fancy Stone (IRE); 2005	Rainbow Quest (USA)	Blushing Groom (FR)
Dam Fancy Green (FR) 2010	Fancy Stone (IRE); 2005	Rainbow Quest (USA)	I Will Follow
Dam Fancy Green (FR) 2010	Fancy Stone (IRE); 2005	Mountain Spirit	Royal Academy (USA)
Dam Fancy Green (FR) 2010	Fancy Stone (IRE); 2005	Mountain Spirit	Martingale (GB) (Family: 1-p)
