= Vela Azul =

Japanese-bred Thoroughbred racehorse

Vela Azul ヴェラアズール
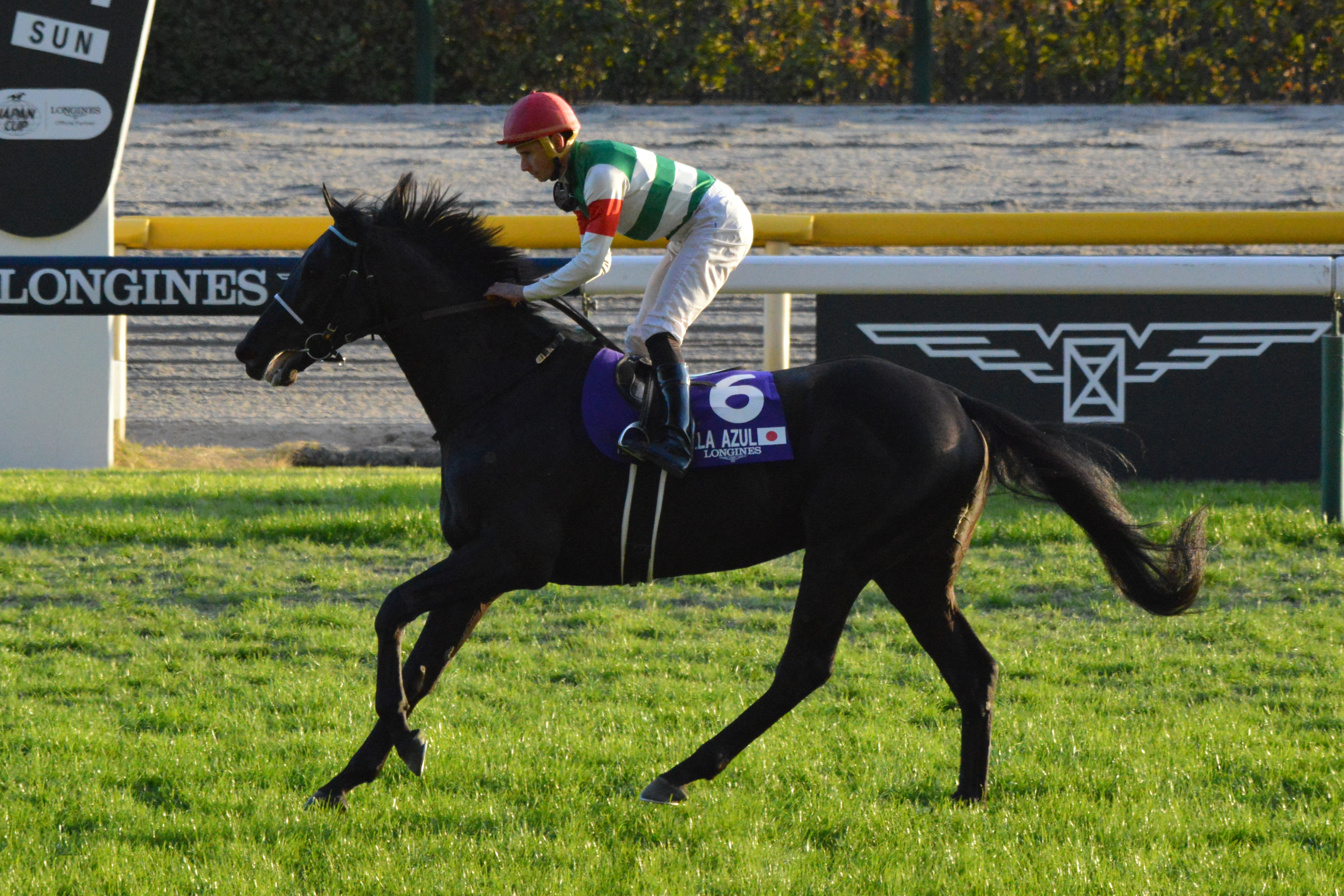
- Vela Azul at the 2022 Japan Cup
- Breed: Thoroughbred
- Sire: Eishin Flash
- Grandsire: King's Best
- Dam: Vela Blanca
- Damsire: Kurofune
- Sex: Colt
- Foaled: 19 January 2017 (age 9)
- Country: Japan
- Color: Black
- Breeder: Shadai Corporation Shiraoi Farm
- Owner: Carrot Farm
- Racing colours
- Trainer: Kunihiko Watanabe
- Jockey: Ryan Moore
- Record: 27:6-4-5
- Earnings: 549,680,000 JPY

Major wins
- Kyoto Daishoten (2022); Japan Cup (2022)
- Last updated on November 10, 2025

Vela Azul (ヴェラアズール, foaled January 19, 2017) is a retired Japanese thoroughbred racehorse.

The horse's name is Spanish for "blue sail", and was derived from his dam's name.

== Racing career ==
=== Up to 4 year old season (2021) ===
The horse underwent surgery at age one to remove bone fragments from his left fetlock, and suffered from osselet on his left forearm at age two. As a result, the horse was not entered into any races until March 20 of 2020, where he finished 2nd at a 1800m long debut race held on the dirt course of the Hanshin Racecourse, with Yuichi Fukunaga as his jockey. According to the horse's trainer, Kunihiko Watanabe, Vela Azul was entered in to dirt races initially due to concerns of his legs as he had at one point weighed nearly 600 kilograms. After several starts, Vela Azul won his first race on June 28, an 1800 m long dirt race at Hanshin with Damian Lane as his jockey. He was able to win his second race at an allowance race on January 10, 2021, held at Chukyo Racecourse. After this win however, he was unable to win any more races for the rest of the 2021 season.

=== 2022: 5 year old season ===
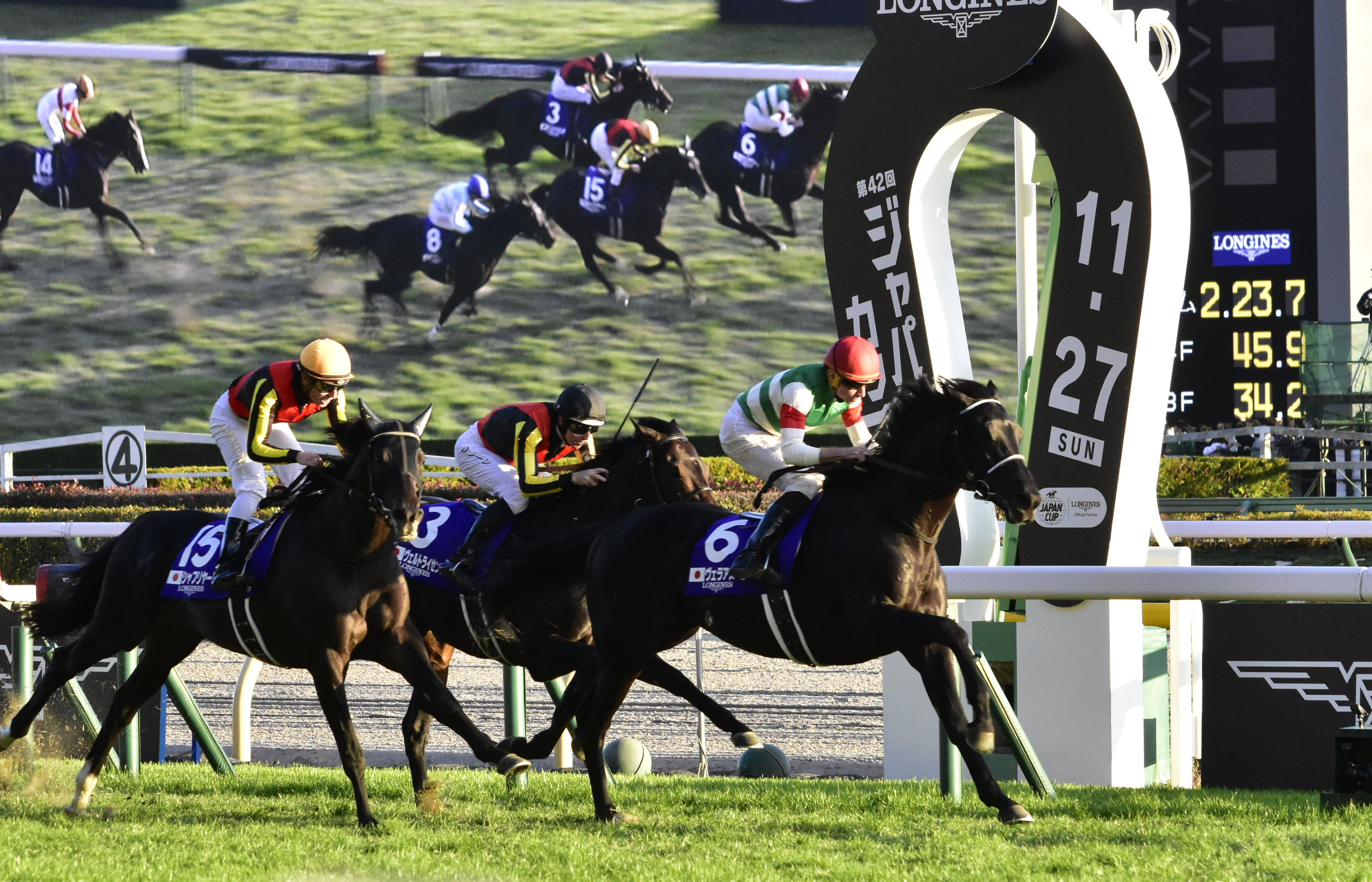
Vela Azul in the 2022 Japan Cup

Watanabe had talks with Carrot Farm that he wished to send the horse to a turf race, but "he lost a good timing to send the horse to such race as the horse did pretty well at dirt races", by which point the horse had already turned 5 years old. He was initially set to start the season in the Yahagigawa Tokubetsu (Dirt 1800m) on March 19, but 36 horses had registered to run in the race, meaning the horse would be barred from running due to there being too many horses. Because of this, and with the horse's condition improving, the horse was entered in to a turf race for the first time, which was the Awaji Tokubetsu (Turf 2600m) held the same day. The horse won the race, which also happened to be his first win in 14 months. Following this, the horse was sent to turf races. After finishing third on the Sunshine Stakes (2500m) and Ryokufu Stakes (2400m), the horse won the June Stakes held over a course of 2400m at Tokyo Racecourse.

After a 4 months break, the horse was entered in to his first graded race with Kohei Matsuyama, the Kyoto Daishoten, held on October 10. The race started with Unicorn Lion taking the lead, with the horse running from behind the pack as Boccherini, Aristoteles, and Win Mighty trailing the runner. As the pack compacted around the 4th corner, Matsuyama whipped to urge the horse to push up, and the horse took the lead, winning the race with a 2 and a half length lead and covering the last three furlongs in 33.2 seconds. This marked the horse's first grade race victory.

On November 27, the horse was entered in to the Japan Cup with Ryan Moore as his jockey. The race was seen as a three-way race between the Derby and Dubai Sheema Classic winner Shahryar, Danon Beluga, who finished the Tenno Sho (Autumn) the month before at 3rd place, Kyoto Daishoten-winner. The race, while light on Japanese trained horses due to Titleholder and Do Deuce competing in the Prix de l'Arc de Triomphe as well as Tenno Sho (Autumn) winner Equinox heading straight to the Arima Kinen, saw most of the betting being placed on Japanese trained horses.

The race started with Fukushima Kinen winner Unicorn Lion taking the lead and the rest of the horses trailing the runner, where Vela Azul was placed in the middle. At around the halfway point Uberleben started to advance, and by the 4th corner Danon Beluga and Shahryar started to pursue, but Vela Azul himself was still in the pack. At around the final 300m mark the horse managed to cut through an opening in the pack, pushing himself up to take the lead against Weltreisende and Sharyar, finishing with a 3/4 length lead against the latter. After Shahryar and Weltreisende, Daring Tact and Danon Beluga followed. This marked the 17th consecutive year that a horse trained in Japan won the Japan Cup, and a third consecutive win for the horse. This victory also marked the first Grade I victory for both the horse, trainer Watanabe, and for any given Eishin Flash progeny.

The horse was later sent to the Arima Kinen, but finished 10th behind Equinox.

=== 2023: 6 year old season ===
Vela Azul started his 6 year old season abroad with the Dubai World Cup, but finished at 13th place. After returning to Japan, the horse was entered in to the Takarazuka Kinen, but finished 8th. After a summer break, he was entered in to the Kyoto Daishoten once again but finished 7th. The horse was then entered in to the Japan Cup, with Ryan Moore initially planned to ride him like last year. However, as Moore returned to England following an unrelated injury at a race in Kyoto resulted in Hollie Doyle assuming the role of jockey. As her husband, Tom Marquand, was also due to ride Studley in the same race, this became the first instance a married couple rode in the same Grade I race in JRA history. The horse finished 7th behind Equinox.

Following the Japan Cup, the horse was sent to pasture to recuperate at Northern Farm Shigaraki in Shiga Prefecture, where a swelling in the left forearm was noted. The horse was given an ultrasound test, where the horse was diagnosed with tendinitis. As the horse was diagnosed that it would take at least a year before the horse could be raced again, it was announced that the horse will be retired from racing on December 6. It was also announced that, following his retirement, Vela Azul would stand stud at the Yushun Stallion Station in Niikappu, Hokkaido.

== Racing form ==
The following form is based on information available on JBIS Search, netkeiba.com, and Total Performance Data.

Date	Track	Race	Grade	Distance (Condition)	Entry	HN	Odds (Favored)	Finish	Time	Margins	Jockey	Winner (Runner-up)
2020 – three-year-old season
Mar 20	Hanshin	3YO Debut		1,800 m (Fast)	16	3	17.6 (5)	2nd	1:56.1	0.4	Yuichi Fukunaga	Regal Manner
Apr 11	Hanshin	3YO Maiden		1,800 m (Fast)	16	16	1.8 (1)	2nd	1:54.7	0.3	Yuichi Fukunaga	Encore Press
May 31	Kyoto	3YO Maiden		1,800 m (Fast)	16	7	1.6 (1)	2nd	1:54.1	0.4	Hideaki Miyuki	Kanekome Noboru
Jun 13	Hanshin	3YO Maiden		1,800 m (Muddy)	16	14	2.7 (2)	3rd	1:52.1	0.3	Yuichi Fukunaga	Meisho Kazusa
Jun 28	Hanshin	3YO Maiden		1,800 m (Good)	16	5	1.6 (1)	1st	1:53.8	-0.2	Damian Lane	(Kool Shine)
Nov 23	Hanshin	3YO Allowance	1 Win	2,000 m (Fast)	10	1	5.5 (2)	4th	2:08.7	0.3	Yuichi Fukunaga	Lord Session
Dec 19	Hanshin	3YO Allowance	1 Win	2,000 m (Fast)	11	9	2.6 (1)	2nd	2:08.4	0.2	Yuichi Fukunaga	Verdite
2021 – four-year-old
Jan	Chukyo	3YO Allowance	1 Win	1,900 m (Fast)	14	3	2.9 (2)	1st	2:01.3	-0.7	Yuichi Fukunaga	(Meisho Kojo)
Mar 20	Chukyo	Yahagigawa Tokubetsu	2 Wins	1,800 m (Fast)	16	11	2.8 (1)	10th	1:55.0	1.3	Yuichi Fukunaga	Danon Glister
Apr 10	Niigata	Fukushima Chuo TV Hai	2 Wins	1,800 m (Fast)	14	2	4.9 (3)	13th	1:54.4	2.0	Katsuma Sameshima	Vehement
Jun 13	Tokyo	Hachioji Tokubetsu	2 Wins	2,100 m (Fast)	16	2	15.7 (6)	3rd	2:11.4	0.6	Christophe Lemaire	Rikisan Daio
Jun 27	Hanshin	Ribbon Sho	2 Wins	2,100 m (Fast)	13	1	4.6 (2)	4th	1:52.4	0.5	Christophe Lemaire	Giuditta
Oct 30	Tokyo	Isezaki Tokubetsu	2 Wins	2,100 m (Fast)	14	12	5.8 (3)	9th	2:12.7	1.6	Christophe Lemaire	Vaisravana
Nov 27	Hanshin	3YO+ Allowance	2 Wins	1,800 m (Fast)	16	9	31.3 (8)	6th	1:54.3	1.1	Katsuma Sameshima	Whole Shebang
Dec 18	Hanshin	Ako Tokubetsu	2 Wins	1,800 m (Sloppy)	14	7	19.4 (4)	3rd	1:52.2	0.1	Fuma Matsuwaka	Narita Forte
2022 – five-year-old
Jan 9	Chukyo	Nobi Tokubetsu	2 Wins	1,800 m (Fast)	15	6	26.2 (7)	7th	1:54.3	1.1	Fuma Matsuwaka	Repun Kamuy
Mar 19	Hanshin	Awaji Tokubetsu	2 Wins	2,600 m (Good)	9	1	7.9 (4)	1st	2:38.4	-0.1	Mirai Iwata	(Prairie Dream)
Apr 17	Nakayama	Sunshine Stakes	3 Wins	2,500 m (Firm)	13	7	5.3 (3)	3rd	2:33.2	0.4	Mirai Iwata	Paradise Reef
May 14	Tokyo	Ryokufu Stakes	3 Wins	2,400 m (Firm)	12	11	6.0 (4)	3rd	2:24.4	0.1	Keita Tosaki	Albillla
Jun 11	Tokyo	June Stakes	3 Wins	2,400 m (Firm)	15	9	2.5 (1)	1st	2:25.7	-0.3	Christophe Lemaire	(Breakup)
Oct 10	Hanshin	Kyoto Daishoten	2	2,400 m (Good)	14	10	7.4 (2)	1st	2:24.3	-0.4	Kohei Matsuyama	(Boccherini)
Nov 27	Tokyo	Japan Cup	1	2,400 m (Firm)	18	6	4.5 (3)	1st	2:23.7	-0.1	Ryan Moore	(Shahryar)
Dec 25	Nakayama	Arima Kinen	1	2,500 m (Firm)	16	6	10.4 (4)	10th	2:34.1	1.7	Kohei Matsuyama	Equinox
2023 – six-year-old
Mar 25	Meydan	Dubai World Cup	1	2,000 m (Fast)	15	15	-	13th	2:13.87	10.62	Cristian Demuro	Ushba Tesoro
Jun 25	Hanshin	Takarazuka Kinen	1	2,200 m (Firm)	17	8	42.1 (9)	8th	2:11.9	0.7	Kohei Matsuyama	Equinox
Oct 9	Kyoto	Kyoto Daishoten	2	2,400 m (Soft)	14	2	8.2 (6)	7th	2:25.7	0.4	Kohei Matsuyama	Pradaria
Nov 26	Tokyo	Japan Cup	1	2,400 m (Firm)	18	9	99.7 (9)	7th	2:23.3	1.5	Hollie Doyle	Equinox

Legend:
Turf Dirt

== Stud career ==
Vela Azul stood stud at the Yushun Stallion Station for two seasons, covering a total of 29 mares. However, he retired from stud duty in late 2025 and became a riding horse at the Northern Horse Park.

== Pedigree ==
Pedigree of Vela Azul
Sire Eishin Flash 2007 d.bay	King's Best; 1997 bay	Kingmambo	Mr. Prospector
Sire Eishin Flash 2007 d.bay	King's Best; 1997 bay	Kingmambo	Miesque
Sire Eishin Flash 2007 d.bay	King's Best; 1997 bay	Allegretta	Lombard
Sire Eishin Flash 2007 d.bay	King's Best; 1997 bay	Allegretta	Anatevka
Sire Eishin Flash 2007 d.bay	Moonlady; 1997 d.bay	Platini	Surumu
Sire Eishin Flash 2007 d.bay	Moonlady; 1997 d.bay	Platini	Prairie Darling
Sire Eishin Flash 2007 d.bay	Moonlady; 1997 d.bay	Midnight Fever	Sure Blade
Sire Eishin Flash 2007 d.bay	Moonlady; 1997 d.bay	Midnight Fever	Majoritat
Dam Vela Blanca 2007 gray	Kurofune; 1998 gray	French Deputy	Deputy Minister
Dam Vela Blanca 2007 gray	Kurofune; 1998 gray	French Deputy	Mitterand
Dam Vela Blanca 2007 gray	Kurofune; 1998 gray	Blue Avenue	Classic Go Go
Dam Vela Blanca 2007 gray	Kurofune; 1998 gray	Blue Avenue	Eliza Blue
Dam Vela Blanca 2007 gray	Admire Sunday; 1995 bay	Sunday Silence	Halo
Dam Vela Blanca 2007 gray	Admire Sunday; 1995 bay	Sunday Silence	Wishing Well
Dam Vela Blanca 2007 gray	Admire Sunday; 1995 bay	Moon Indigo	El Gran Senor
Dam Vela Blanca 2007 gray	Admire Sunday; 1995 bay	Moon Indigo	Madelia
