= Make Believe (horse) =

British-bred Thoroughbred racehorse

- Racing silks of Prince A A Faisal
- Sire: Makfi
- Grandsire: Dubawi
- Dam: Rosie's Posy
- Damsire: Suave Dancer
- Sex: Colt
- Foaled: 19 February 2012
- Country: United Kingdom
- Colour: Bay
- Breeder: Aston Mullins Stud
- Owner: Prince A A Faisal
- Trainer: André Fabre
- Record: 7: 4-1-0
- Earnings: £462,855

Major wins
- Poule d'Essai des Poulains (2015); Prix de la Forêt (2015)

Make Believe (foaled 19 February 2012) is a British-bred, French-trained Thoroughbred racehorse. After winning both his races as a two-year-old he developed into a top-class performer in 2015, recording Group One victories in the Poule d'Essai des Poulains and the Prix de la Forêt.

== Background ==
Make Believe is a bay colt with a small white star and two white socks bred in the United Kingdom by the Buckinghamshire-based Aston Mullins Stud. He was from the first crop of foals sired by Makfi, who won the 2000 Guineas and the Prix Jacques Le Marois in 2010. Make Believe's dam Rosie's Posy was a moderate racehorse who won one minor race from six starts, but was descended from the influential broodmare Crystal Palace, the ancestor of many major winners including Royal Palace, Light Cavalry, Fairy Footsteps and Desert Prince. Before foaling Make Believe, Rosie's Posy had produced Dubawi Heights, whose wins included the Gamely Stakes and the Yellow Ribbon Stakes.

Make Believe was consigned as a foal to the Tattersalls sale in November 2012 and was bought for 180,000 guineas by the bloodstock agent Hugo Merry. He entered the ownership of Prince A A Faisal and was sent into training with André Fabre at Chantilly.

== Racing career ==
=== 2014: two-year-old season ===
Make Believe began his racing career in a maiden race over 1500 metres at Deauville Racecourse on 23 October and started the 7/10 favourite against ten opponents. Ridden by Maxime Guyon he led from the start and won by one and a half lengths from Sinfonietta. On heavy ground at Saint-Cloud Racecourse on 18 November he started 1/2 favourite for the Prix Tanerko over the same distance, and won "comfortably" by two and a half lengths from Lugana.

=== 2015: three-year-old season ===
On his three-year-old debut, Make Believe was ridden by Pierre-Charles Boudot and started favourite for the Grade Three Prix Djebel over 1400 metres at Maisons-Laffitte Racecourse on 2 April. After racing in second place he took the lead 400 metres from the finish but was caught in the final stride and beaten a head by the Freddy Head-trained Ride Like The Wind. Olivier Peslier took over the ride when make believe was one of eighteen colt to contest the Poule d'Essai des Poulains over 1600 metres at Longchamp Racecourse. He was made the 5/1 second favourite behind the Aidan O'Brien-trained Highland Reel with the Prix de Fontainebleau runner-up Karar next in the betting. Few of the others were given any serious chance, but the more fancied outsiders included Muhaarar from England and the Fabre stable's second runner New Bay. Peslier sent the colt into the lead from the start and set a steady pace before accelerating clear of the field 400 metres from the finish. He never looked in any danger of defeat and won by three lengths from New Bay with Mr Owen and Karar in third and fourth. Explaining his choice of tactics, Peslier said "He is a horse who is the ideal type to try and make all and I didn't hestitate in trying to do so. He broke well and although he was a little bit keen early I managed to settle him quite quickly. When you get on a roll like that you don't want to stop them and he finished very well".

In June Make Believe was sent to England for the St James's Palace Stakes over one mile at Royal Ascot and started second favourite behind Gleneagles. After pulling hard against Peslier's attempts to restrain him he faded quickly in the last quarter mile and finished last of the five runners, more than twelve lengths behind the winning favourite. Commenting on the performance some time later, Faisal's racing advisor Ted Voute said "He ran a bit flat at Ascot and Andre has always said he is a delicate horse and that we need to look after him. We possibly ran him back too quick after the French Guineas and we'll let the horse tell us when he is ready for a run".

Make Believe was off the racecourse for three and a half months before returning on 4 October when he was matched against older horses for the first time in the Prix de la Forêt over 1400 metres at Longchamp. The three-year-old British gelding Limato started favourite after an impressive win in the Park Stakes with Make Believe next in the betting on 9/2. The other runners included Taniyar (Prix du Pin), Toormore, Gordon Lord Byron (winner of the race in 2012), Custom Cut (Boomerang Stakes), G Force (Haydock Sprint Cup) and Ride Like The Wind. After tracking the leaders, Peslier switched his mount to the outside to make his challenge 400 metres out. Make Believe accelerated into the lead, opened up a clear advantage and won by one and a quarter lengths from the fast-finishing Limato. Toormore got the best of a five-horse blanket finish for third place.

On his final start of the season, Make Believe was sent to the United States to contest the Breeders' Cup Mile at Keeneland on 31 October. He was made the 2.7/1 favourite in a field which also included Esoterique and Karakontie. He started slowly and never looked likely to win, finishing fifth of the twelve runners behind Tepin.

== Stud record ==
In 2016, Make Believe was retired from racing to stand as a breeding stallion at the Ballylinch Stud in Ireland.

=== Notable progeny ===
c = colt, f = filly, g = gelding

Foaled	Name	Sex	Major wins
2017	Mishriff	c	Prix du Jockey Club, Saudi Cup, Dubai Sheema Classic, International Stakes
2021	Royal Supremacy	g	The Metropolitan
2021	Sajir	c	Prix Maurice de Gheest

== Pedigree ==
Pedigree of Make Believe (GB), bay colt, 2012
Sire Makfi (GB) 2007	Dubawi (IRE); 2002	Dubai Millennium (GB)	Seeking The Gold (USA)
Sire Makfi (GB) 2007	Dubawi (IRE); 2002	Dubai Millennium (GB)	Colorado Dancer (IRE)
Sire Makfi (GB) 2007	Dubawi (IRE); 2002	Zomaradah (GB)	Deploy
Sire Makfi (GB) 2007	Dubawi (IRE); 2002	Zomaradah (GB)	Jawaher (IRE)
Sire Makfi (GB) 2007	Dhelaal (GB); 2002	Green Desert (USA)	Danzig
Sire Makfi (GB) 2007	Dhelaal (GB); 2002	Green Desert (USA)	Foreign Courier
Sire Makfi (GB) 2007	Dhelaal (GB); 2002	Irish Valley (USA)	Irish River (FR)
Sire Makfi (GB) 2007	Dhelaal (GB); 2002	Irish Valley (USA)	Green Valley (FR)
Dam Rosie's Posy (IRE) 1999	Suave Dancer (USA); 1988	Green Dancer	Nijinsky (CAN)
Dam Rosie's Posy (IRE) 1999	Suave Dancer (USA); 1988	Green Dancer	Green Valley (FR)
Dam Rosie's Posy (IRE) 1999	Suave Dancer (USA); 1988	Suavite	Alleged
Dam Rosie's Posy (IRE) 1999	Suave Dancer (USA); 1988	Suavite	Guinevere's Folly
Dam Rosie's Posy (IRE) 1999	My Branch (GB); 1993	Distant Relative (IRE)	Habitat (USA)
Dam Rosie's Posy (IRE) 1999	My Branch (GB); 1993	Distant Relative (IRE)	Royal Sister
Dam Rosie's Posy (IRE) 1999	My Branch (GB); 1993	Pay The Bank	High Top (IRE)
Dam Rosie's Posy (IRE) 1999	My Branch (GB); 1993	Pay The Bank	Zebra Grass (Family 1-s)

- Make Believe is inbred 4 × 4 to Green Valley, meaning that this mare appears twice in the fourth generation of his pedigree.
