= Emblem Road =

- Sire: Quality Road
- Dam: Venturini
- Damsire: Bernardini
- Sex: Gelding
- Foaled: April 20, 2018
- Country: United States
- Colour: Dark brown
- Breeder: Brushy Hill LLC
- Owner: Prince Saud Bin Salman Abdulaziz
- Trainer: Mitab Almulawah
- Record: 13 (8-1-2)
- Earnings: $12,021,492

Major wins
- Saudi Cup (2022)

Emblem Road (foaled April 20, 2018), is an American-bred Thoroughbred racehorse.

He won the 2022 Saudi Cup under Panamanian jockey Wigberto S. Ramos as an 80-1 outsider. He ran in the 2023 Saudi Cup but lost to Panthalassa. He also ran in the 2023 Dubai World Cup but this time finished third behind Ushba Tesoro.

== Pedigree ==
Pedigree of Emblem Road
Sire Quality Road 2006 b.	Elusive Quality; 1993 b.	Gone West	Mr. Prospector
Sire Quality Road 2006 b.	Elusive Quality; 1993 b.	Gone West	Secrettame
Sire Quality Road 2006 b.	Elusive Quality; 1993 b.	Touch of Greatness	Hero's Honor
Sire Quality Road 2006 b.	Elusive Quality; 1993 b.	Touch of Greatness	Ivory Wand
Sire Quality Road 2006 b.	Kobla; 1995 ch.	Strawberry Road	Whiskey Road
Sire Quality Road 2006 b.	Kobla; 1995 ch.	Strawberry Road	Giftisa
Sire Quality Road 2006 b.	Kobla; 1995 ch.	Winglet	Alydar
Sire Quality Road 2006 b.	Kobla; 1995 ch.	Winglet	Highest Trump
Dam Venturini 2012 b.	Bernadini; 2003 b.	A. P. Indy	Seattle Slew
Dam Venturini 2012 b.	Bernadini; 2003 b.	A. P. Indy	Weekend Surprise
Dam Venturini 2012 b.	Bernadini; 2003 b.	Cara Rafaela	Quiet American
Dam Venturini 2012 b.	Bernadini; 2003 b.	Cara Rafaela	Oil Fable
Dam Venturini 2012 b.	Ventura; 2004 dk. b.	Chester House	Mr. Prospector
Dam Venturini 2012 b.	Ventura; 2004 dk. b.	Chester House	Toussaud
Dam Venturini 2012 b.	Ventura; 2004 dk. b.	Estala	Be My Guest
Dam Venturini 2012 b.	Ventura; 2004 dk. b.	Estala	Roupala
