= Jane Chapple-Hyam =

British racehorse trainer (born 1966)

Jane Chapple-Hyam (born October 1966) is an Australian-British racehorse trainer based in Newmarket. She trains horses to run on the flat and saddled her first Group 1 winner in September 2021.

== Background ==
Chapple-Hyam was born Jane Peacock in Melbourne, Australia. Her parents were Susan Rossiter and politician Andrew Peacock. Chapple-Hyam was involved with racing from an early age; her father was the owner of Leilani, winner of the 1974 Caulfield Cup. She attended Geelong Grammar School and did work experience with trainer Colin Hayes. Her parents divorced in 1977 and in 1978 her mother married the British businessman and thoroughbred owner Robert Sangster. Their horse Beldale Ball won the Melbourne Cup in 1980.

Chapple Hyam spent holidays with her mother and stepfather in England and at the age of 17 did a course in stud management at the National Stud in Newmarket. While working at her stepfather's Manton House stables near Marlborough, Wiltshire, she met her future husband Peter Chapple-Hyam.

== Career as a trainer ==
In 2005, with her marriage over, Chapple-Hyam moved to Newmarket and took out a licence to train on her own account. Her first major success came in 2006 when 100/1 outsider Mudawin, ridden by John Egan, won the Ebor Handicap at York. Her first Group race success came in October 2010, when Klammer, ridden by Jamie Spencer, won the Horris Hill Stakes at Newbury. In 2012 Chapple-Hyam acquired the six-year-old Mull of Killough, who went on to win three Group 3 races at Newmarket: the 2012 Darley Stakes and the 2013 and 2014 Earl of Sefton Stakes. He also ran in Group 1 races in Singapore, US and Australia and a Group 2 race in Dubai, without being able to repeat the success he had on his home turf. There were more Group 3 successes with Energia Davos and Saffron Beach before the trainer landed her first Group 1 victory when Saffron Beach, ridden by William Buick, won the 2021 Sun Chariot Stakes at Newmarket, beating favourite Mother Earth by three lengths. "It's fantastic to finally have our first Group 1 winner and especially for it to be at our local track. That is some compensation for being beaten in the 1,000 Guineas..." she said, referring to the fact that Saffron Beach had come second to Mother Earth in the 1,000 Guineas.

== Major wins ==
(United Kingdom) Great Britain

- July Cup - (1) - Mill Stream (2024)
- Sun Chariot Stakes - (1) - Saffron Beach (2022)

France

- Prix Rothschild - (1) - Saffron Beach (2022)
