= Neom Turf Cup =

Thoroughbred horse race

- Class: Group 1
- Location: Riyadh, Saudi Arabia
- Inaugurated: 2020
- Race type: Thoroughbred - Flat racing

Race information
- Distance: 2,100 meters
- Surface: Turf
- Track: King Abdulaziz Racetrack
- Weight: thesaudicup.com.sa/en
- Purse: $3,000,000; 1st: $1,800,000

Neom Turf Cup is an international horse race held at King Abdulaziz Racetrack in Riyadh, Saudi Arabia.

== Race details ==
The race was founded by the Saudi Arabia Jockey Club in 2020. It is currently run at 2,100 meters on turf, only open to three-year-old thoroughbreds and above, with a prize money of US$3 million. Currently run as an undercard race on the Saudi Cup Night.

Originally founded as the listed Mohamed Yousuf Naghi Motors Cup in 2020, it was promoted to international grade 3 in 2022, grade 2 in 2024, and eventually grade 1 in 2026.

== Winners ==
Year	Winner	Age	Jockey	Trainer	Owner	Time
2020	Port Lions	5	Adrie de Vries	Fawzi Abdulla	Victorious Racing	2:11.41
2021	True Self	8	Hollie Doyle	Willie Mullins	Three Mile House Partnership & Oti True Self Syndicate	2:10.57
2022	Authority	5	Christophe Lemaire	Tetsuya Kimura	Silk Racing	2:06.72
2023	Mostahdaf	5	Jim Crowley	John Gosden	Shadwell Estate Company Ltd	2:06.23
2024	Spirit Dancer	7	Oisin Orr	Richard Fahey	Done Ferguson Mason	2:07.10
2025	Shin Emperor	4	Ryusei Sakai	Yoshito Yahagi	Susumu Fujita	2:07.74
2026	Royal Champion	8	Oisin Murphy	Karl Burke	Sheikh Mohammed Obaid	2:06.22
