= Riyadh Dirt Sprint =

Thoroughbred Horse Race in Saudi Arabia

- Class: Grade 2
- Location: Riyadh, Saudi Arabia
- Inaugurated: 2020
- Race type: Thoroughbred – Flat racing
- Website: https://jcsa.sa/en/saudi-cup/

Race information
- Distance: 1,200 meters
- Surface: Dirt
- Track: King Abdulaziz Racetrack
- Qualification: Three-year-old and above
- Weight: NH 3-y-o: 52 kg, SH 3-y-o: 58 kg, 4-y-0 + 59.5 kg If there are no NH-bred: SH 3-y-0 55.5 kg, 4-y-o + 57 kg Filly & mare allowance: 2 kg
- Purse: $2,000,000

Riyadh Dirt Sprint (Arabic: كأس الرياض للسرعة) is an international horse race held at King Abdulaziz Racetrack in Riyadh, Saudi Arabia.

== Race details ==
The race was founded by the Saudi Arabia Jockey Club in 2020. It is currently run at 1,200 meters on dirt, only open to three-year-old thoroughbreds and above, with a prize money of US$1.5 million. The prize money has been increased to $2,000,000 for 2025.

Currently run as an undercard race on the Saudi Cup Night.

Horses trained overseas must have finished in the top 4 in a graded or listed race in an International Federation of Horseracing Authorities Part I country. Alternatively, horses must have a rating of 100 or higher (96 or higher for fillies or mares) in their home country at the time of registration.

== History ==
- 2020 – Race was founded under the name "Saudia Sprint".
- 2021 – Race name was changed to "Riyadh Dirt Sprint".
- 2022 – IFHA promotes the race to international grade 3.

== Winners ==
Year	Winner	Foaled	Trained	Owned	Age	Jockey	Trainer	Owner	Time
2020	New York Central	United States	Saudi Arabia	Saudi Arabia	5	Irad Ortiz Jr.	Fahad Saad	Faisal bin Khaled bin Abdulaziz	1:11.68
2021	Copano Kicking	United States	Japan	Japan	6	William Buick	Akira Murayama	Sachiaki Kobayashi	1:10.66
2022	Dancing Prince	Japan	Japan	Japan	6	Christophe Lemaire	Keisuke Miyata	Chizu Yoshida	1:10.26
2023	Elite Power	United States	United States	Saudi Arabia	5	Frankie Dettori	William I. Mott	Juddmonte	1:11.01
2024	Remake	Japan	Japan	Japan	5	Yuga Kawada	Koichi Shintani	Koji Maeda	1:10.42
2025	Straight No Chaser	United States	United States	United States	6	John R. Velazquez	Dan Blacker	My Racehorse	1:11.159
2026	Imagination	United States	United States	United States	5	Flavien Prat	Bob Baffert	SF Racing LLC, Starlight Racing	1:12.00

- Record Time: 1:10.26 – Dancing Prince

== See also ==
- Horses in Saudi Arabia

== Bibliography ==
- Racing Post:
  - 2020, 2021, 2022, 2023, 2024, 2025, 2026
