= Darley Stakes =

Flat horse race in Britain

- Class: Group 3
- Location: Rowley Mile; Newmarket, England
- Inaugurated: 1987
- Race type: Flat / Thoroughbred
- Website: Newmarket

Race information
- Distance: 1m 1f (1,811 metres)
- Surface: Turf
- Track: Straight
- Qualification: Three-years-old and up
- Weight: 9 st 1 lb (3yo); 9 st 5 lb (4yo+); Allowances; 3 lb for fillies and mares Penalties; 7 lb for Group 1 winners * 5 lb for Group 2 winners * 3 lb for Group 3 winners * * after 31 March
- Purse: £85,000 (2025); 1st: £45,368

Darley Stakes
2026
Humidity	The Lost King	High Stock

Previous years
2025
Damysus	Gladius	First Conquest
2024
Lead Artist	Liberty Lane	Peace Man
2023
Highland Avenue	Silver Sword	Raadobarg
2022
Alflaila	Ottoman Fleet	Royal Fleet
2021
Mostahdaf	Bedouin's Story	Finest Sound

2020-2011
2020
Lady Wannabe	Dream Castle	Epic Hero
2019
Feliciana De Vega	Indeed	Prince Eiji
2018
Euginio	Forest Ranger	Gabr
2017
Monarchs Glen	Robin Of Navan	Spark Plug
2016
Muffri'Ha	Carry On Deryck	Johannes Vermeer
2015
Energia Davos	Sovereign Debt	Mutakayyef
2014
Berkshire	Mutakayyef	Air Pilot
2013
Highland Knight	Tales Of Grimm	Chapter Seven
2012
Mull Of Killough	Saigon	Stipulate
2011
Bubble Chic	Dux Scholar	Questioning

2010-2001
2010
Tazeez	Steele Tango	Mastery
2009
Steele Tango	Glass Harmonium	Palavicini
2008
Charlie Farnsbarns	Bankable	Kirklees
2007
Windsor Knot	Mashaahed	Blue Ksar
2006
Stage Gift	Windsor Knot	Bahia Breeze
2005
Enforcer	Mullins Bay	St Andrews
2004
Autumn Glory	Sights On Gold	Babodana
2003
Far Lane	Pawn Broker	Checkit
2002
Golden Silca	Masterful	Beauchamp Pilot
2001
Right Wing	Smirk	Lagudin

2000-1991
2000
Albarahin	Summer View	Duck Row
1999
Indian Lodge	Maidaan	Silk St John
1998
Haami	Mudeer	Illusion
1997
Fahris	Amid Albadu	Proper Blue
1996
Tarawa	Nijo	Forest Buck
1995
Restructure	Lap Of Luxury	Wijara
1994
Desert Shot	Mistle Cat	Mellottie
1993
Wharf	Amazing Feat	Soviet Line
1992
Mellottie	Rainbow Corner	Calling Collect
1991
Susurration	Heart Of Darkness	Military Fashion

1990-1988
1990
Raj Waki	Theatrical Charmer	Tabdea
1989
Princess Accord	Sabotage	Light Of Morn
1988
Media Starguest	Organza	Alwuhush

The Darley Stakes is a Group 3 flat horse race in Great Britain open to horses aged three years or older. It is run on the Rowley Mile at Newmarket over a distance of 1 mile and 1 furlong (1,811 metres), and it is scheduled to take place each year in October.

== History ==
The event was established in 1987, but the inaugural running was abandoned because of high winds and structural damage. For a period the race held Listed status, and it was promoted to Group 3 level in 2003.

The Darley Stakes was formerly staged during Newmarket's Champions' Meeting in mid-October. It became part of a new fixture called Future Champions Day in 2011.

== Records ==
Most successful horse:

- no horse has won this race more than once

Leading jockey (4 wins):

- Richard Hills – Fahris (1997), Haami (1998), Albarahin (2000), Tazeez (2010)

Leading trainer (6 wins): (includes jointly trained)

- John Gosden – Susurration (1991), Tazeez (2010), Monarchs Glen (2017), Mostahdaf (2021), Lead Artist (2024), Damysus (2025)

== Winners ==
Year	Winner	Age	Jockey	Trainer	Time
1987	Abandoned due to high winds and structural damage
1988	Media Starguest	4	Ray Cochrane	Luca Cumani	1:55.67
1989	Princess Accord	3	Frankie Dettori	Luca Cumani	1:50.70
1990	Raj Waki	3	Ray Cochrane	Guy Harwood	1:53.22
1991	Susurration	4	Willie Carson	John Gosden	1:48.35
1992	Mellottie	7	John Lowe	Mary Reveley	1:48.62
1993	Wharf	3	Pat Eddery	Henry Cecil	1:53.15
1994	Desert Shot	4	Frankie Dettori	Michael Stoute	1:50.63
1995	Restructure	3	Paul Eddery	Julie Cecil	1:50.23
1996	Tarawa	4	Richard Hughes	Neville Callaghan	1:51.91
1997	Fahris	3	Richard Hills	Ben Hanbury	1:55.43
1998	Haami	3	Richard Hills	John Dunlop	1:50.54
1999 (Note: The 1999 running took place on Newmarket's July Course over 1 mile and 110 yards)	Indian Lodge	3	Kieren Fallon	Amanda Perrett	1:47.40
2000	Albarahin	5	Richard Hills	Marcus Tregoning	1:53.87
2001	Right Wing	7	Pat Eddery	John Dunlop	1:57.44
2002	Golden Silca	6	Ted Durcan	Mick Channon	1:50.52
2003	Far Lane	4	Richard Hughes	Barry Hills	1:51.60
2004	Autumn Glory	4	Steve Drowne	Geoff Wragg	1:54.96
2005	Enforcer	3	Martin Dwyer	Willie Muir	1:53.38
2006	Stage Gift	3	Ryan Moore	Sir Michael Stoute	1:53.69
2007	Windsor Knot	5	Ted Durcan	Saeed bin Suroor	1:52.38
2008	Charlie Farnsbarns	4	Ryan Moore	Brian Meehan	1:47.78
2009	Steele Tango	4	Liam Keniry	Roger Teal	1:49.55
2010	Tazeez	6	Richard Hills	John Gosden	1:49.74
2011	Bubble Chic	3	Olivier Peslier	Giuseppe Botti	1:50.85
2012	Mull of Killough	6	Joseph O'Brien	Jane Chapple-Hyam	1:51.37
2013	Highland Knight	6	David Probert	Andrew Balding	1.51.21
2014	Berkshire	3	Jim Crowley	Paul Cole	1:53.40
2015	Energia Davos	7	Jamie Spencer	Jane Chapple-Hyam	1:51.76
2016	Muffri'Ha	4	Pat Cosgrave	William Haggas	1:51.71
2017	Monarchs Glen	3	Frankie Dettori	John Gosden	1:51.71
2018	Forest Ranger (Note: Euginio passed the post first but was disqualified after a BHA enquiry)	4	Tony Hamilton	Richard Fahey	1:50.78
2019	Feliciana De Vega	3	Harry Bentley	Ralph Beckett	1:54.38
2020	Lady Wannabe	4	Jamie Spencer	Fozzy Stack	1:53.65
2021	Mostahdaf	3	Jim Crowley	John & Thady Gosden	1:52.03
2022	Alflaila	3	Jim Crowley	Owen Burrows	1:48.16
2023	Highland Avenue	5	William Buick	Charlie Appleby	1:50.35
2024	Lead Artist	3	Kieran Shoemark	John & Thady Gosden	1:52.40
2025	Damysus	3	James Doyle	John & Thady Gosden	1:48.12
2026	Humidity	3	James Doyle	Andrew Balding	1:48.12

== See also ==
- Horse racing in Great Britain
- List of British flat horse races
