= Saudi Cup =

- Class: Group 1
- Location: Riyadh, Saudi Arabia
- Inaugurated: 2020
- Race type: Thoroughbred - Flat racing

Race information
- Distance: 1,800 meters
- Surface: Dirt and Turf
- Track: King Abdulaziz Racetrack
- Weight: thesaudicup.com.sa/en
- Purse: $20,000,000; 1st:$10,000,000

Saudi Cup
2026
Forever Young	Nysos	Tumbarumba

Previous years
2025
Forever Young	Romantic Warrior	Ushba Tesoro
2024
Senor Buscador	Ushba Tesoro	Saudi Crown
2023
Panthalassa	Country Grammer	Cafe Pharoah
2022
Emblem Road	Country Grammer	Midnight Bourbon
2021
Mishriff	Charlatan	Great Scot
2020
Maximum Security	Midnight Bisou	Benbatl

The Saudi Cup (Arabic: كأس السعودية) is an international horse race held annually at the end of February at King Abdulaziz Racetrack in Riyadh, Saudi Arabia. It is the richest horse race ever held, with a $20 million purse. It is the main highlight race of the Saudi Cup Night, is a series of eight thoroughbred horse races and one Purebred Arabian race.

== Race details ==
The race is notable for its 20 million dollar purse, which makes it the most lucrative event in horse racing.

The race is held four weeks after the $3 million Pegasus World Cup at Gulfstream Park, Florida, and four weeks before the $12 million Dubai World Cup at Meydan Racecourse, Dubai, making it possible for horses in those races to compete.

In 2021, the Pegasus World Cup in the United States and the Champions Cup in Japan were "Win and You're In" qualifiers for the Saudi Cup.

The International Federation of Horseracing Authorities' Grading and Race Planning Advisory Committee assigned Group 1 status to the Saudi Cup before its third running, scheduled for February 2022.

The festival is accompanied by cultural events in partnership with the Ministry of Culture, Saudi heritage fashion expert Dr. Laila Albassam, and illustrator Norah Sahman – who co-developed the Saudi Cup Dress Code. Attendees dress in styles inspired by the heritage costumes worn across the Kingdom. The event also offers traditional foods, live musical concerts, art shows, and performances from various parts of Saudi Arabia.

== History ==
=== 2020 ===
The first edition of the race was held on February 29, 2020. It was won by an American horse, Maximum Security, ridden by Luis Saez. The Jockey Club of Saudi Arabia announced two months later that it would withhold Maximum Security's purse money pending an investigation, following the indictment of trainer Jason Servis in the United States. Nearly four years after the inaugural race, in January 2024 the Jockey Club formally recommended Maximum Security's disqualification. The Jockey Club claimed that Servis, who was convicted in December 2022 by pleading guilty to two charges related to drug misbranding and adulteration, committed "substantial breaches of the rules." The matter was referred to the Stewards' Committee, which will conduct a hearing into the matter at a later date.

=== 2021 ===
The second edition of the Saudi Cup was held on Saturday, 20 February 2021, at the King Abdulaziz Racetrack in Riyadh.

Prince Mohammed bin Salman (on behalf of The Custodian of the Two Holy Mosques King Salman bin Abdulaziz) crowned horse owner Prince Abdulrahman bin Abdullah Al-Faisal after his horse Mishriff won the race. He also congratulated its trainer, John Gosden, and jockey, David Egan, who received a figurine of a horse and a jockey’s helmet, respectively.

The race, which is the richest horse race in the world with a total prize money worth $30.5 million, attracts top horses, trainers, and jockeys from across the globe. A total of 77 horses took part from 13 countries with the winner taking home a grand prize of $20 million.

The participating field included Maximum Security, Benbatl, Midnight Bisou, Mucho Gusto, and Tacitus under the supervision of world-renowned trainers like American Bob Baffert, Briton John Gosden, American Steven Asmussen, and his compatriot Brad Cox, as well as local trainers Abdullah bin Mishriff and Shaleh Alodhiaani.

=== 2022 ===
In the third edition of the Saudi Cup, Crown Prince Mohammed bin Salman bin Abdulaziz crowned Prince Saud bin Salman, owner of Emblem Road, with the race title at the King Abdulaziz Racetrack in Riyadh.

This edition saw a new Guinness World Record being set, with the most expensive single-horse race being held with prize money exceeding 75 million Saudi riyals.

The remaining races on the final day were won by the horse Authority, owned by Silk Racing Co. Ltd. in the first race; the second race by the horse Songline, owned by Sunday Racing Ltd.; the third race by the horse Stay Foolish, owned by Shadai Race Horse Co. Ltd.; the fourth race by the horse Ann Alawaan owned by King Abdullah bin Abdulaziz’s sons; the fifth race by the horse Hadi De Carrere owned by Khalifa Al Kuwari; the sixth race by the horse Pinehurst owned by Madaket Stables and Starlight Racing; and the seventh race by the horse Dancing Prince owned by Chizu Yoshida.

=== 2023 ===
In the fourth edition of the Saudi Cup, Crown Prince Mohammed bin Salman crowned Hiroo Race Co., the Japanese owner of the horse Panthalassa, the race winner and Saudi Cup champion, receiving $10 million.

The following horses occupied positions two to six in the $20 million race: Country Grammar, Cafe Pharoah, Geoglyph, Crown Pride, and Emblem Road.

The total prize money for the fourth edition that was held under the slogan We Race the World totaled $35 million.

=== 2024 ===
In the fifth edition of the Saudi Cup, Crown Prince Mohammed bin Salman crowned Sharaf Al Hariri, owner of the horse Senor Buscador, for winning the race that was held on 24 February 2024 at King Abdulaziz Racetrack in Riyadh while also receiving a cash prize of $20 million.

This edition of the Saudi Cup Night prize money totaled at $37.6 million.

=== 2025 ===
In the sixth edition of the Saudi Cup, Crown Prince Mohammed bin Salman crowned Susumu Fujita, the Japanese owner of the horse Forever Young, for winning the race that was held on 22 February 2025, receiving the cash prize of $20 million after beating Romantic Warrior by a neck in a stretch duel.

This edition of the Saudi Cup Night prize money totaled at $38.1 million.

=== 2026 ===
In the seventh edition of the Saudi Cup, the reigning champion Forever Young defeated Nysos to secure back-to-back wins in the Saudi Cup and the winning prize of $10 million. Jockey Ryusei Sakai gave much praise to Forever Young, stating: "I didn't think he would lose. So, I believed in him and rode him with confidence... No matter how he wins, he does it strongly."

This edition of the Saudi Cup Night prize money totaled at $35.5 million.

== Records ==
Speed record:

- 1:49.099 – Forever Young (2025)

Most wins by a trainer:

- 3 – Yoshito Yahagi (2023, 2025, 2026)

Most wins by a Jockey:

- 2 – Ryusei Sakai (2025, 2026)

Most wins by a horse:

- 2 – Forever Young (2025, 2026)

== Winners ==
Year	Winner	Age	Jockey	Trainer	Owner	Time	Ref
2026	Forever Young (JPN)	5	Ryusei Sakai (JPN)	Yoshito Yahagi (JPN)	Susumu Fujita (JPN)	1:51.027	
2025	Forever Young (JPN)	4	Ryusei Sakai (JPN)	Yoshito Yahagi (JPN)	Susumu Fujita (JPN)	1:49.099	
2024	Senor Buscador (USA)	6	Junior Alvarado (VEN)	Todd W. Fincher (USA)	Joe R. Peacock Jr. (USA) & Sharaf Al Hariri (KSA) (Note: Joe R. Peacock had signed a two-race lease (Saudi Cup and Dubai World Cup) with Saudi businessman Sharaf Mohammed S. Al-Hariri in February 2024)	1:49.50	
2023	Panthalassa (JPN)	6	Yutaka Yoshida (JPN)	Yoshito Yahagi (JPN)	Hiroo Race Co., Ltd. (JPN)	1:50.80	
2022	Emblem Road (USA)	4	Wigberto S. Ramos (PAN)	Mitab Almulawah (KSA)	Prince Saud Bin Salman Abdulaziz (KSA)	1:50.53	
2021	Mishriff (IRE)	4	David Egan (IRE)	John Gosden (GB)	Prince Abdul Rahman al Faisal (KSA)	1:49.59	
2020	Midnight Bisou (USA) (Note: In 2020 Maximum Security crossed the line first, but was disqualified following an investigation into trainer Jason Servis by the Jockey Club of Saudi Arabia that concluded in August 2024.)	5	Mike E. Smith (USA)	Steven M. Asmussen (USA)	Bloom Racing Stable LLC (USA), Madaket Stables (USA) & Allen Racing LLC (USA)	1:50.59	

== See also ==
- Horses in Saudi Arabia
