= Makfi =

British-bred Thoroughbred racehorse

- Racing silks of Mathieu Offenstadt
- Sire: Dubawi
- Grandsire: Dubai Millennium
- Dam: Dhelaal
- Damsire: Green Desert
- Sex: Stallion
- Foaled: 4 March 2007
- Country: Great Britain
- Colour: Bay
- Breeder: Shadwell Estate Company Ltd
- Owner: Mathieu Offenstadt
- Trainer: Mikel Delzangles
- Record: 6: 4–0–0
- Earnings: £584,723

Major wins
- Prix Djebel (2010); 2000 Guineas (2010); Prix Jacques Le Marois (2010)

Makfi (foaled 4 March 2007) is a British-bred, French-trained Thoroughbred racehorse and sire. In 2010 he won the 2000 Guineas and Prix Jacques Le Marois.

== Background ==
Makfi's sire is Irish 2,000 Guineas and Prix Jacques Le Marois winner Dubawi. Makfi was one of Dubawi's first crop of foals, which also included Poet's Voice and Monterosso. Makfi's dam, Dhelaal, is a daughter of Green Desert and a half-sister of the Cartier Champion Two-year-old Colt Alhaarth. As a granddaughter of the broodmare Green Valley, Dhelaal was also closely related to Green Dancer, Solemia and Authorized. He went into training with Marcus Tregoning in England and was owned by his breeder Hamdan Al Maktoum. He was sold as an unraced two-year-old at the Tattersall's Horses in Training Sale in October 2009 at Newmarket.He was transferred to France and trained by Mikel Delzangles and owned by Mathieu Offenstadt.

== Racing career ==
Makfi made his first start in 2009, winning a five-runner race at Fontainebleau. This was his only start as a two-year-old and was next seen easily winning the Prix Djebel in April 2010. He then started the 2000 Guineas at Newmarket as a 33/1 outsider. In the race jockey Christophe Lemaire held Makfi up towards the rear of the field. He made progress thought the field with two furlongs left to run and overtook leading Dick Turpin inside the final furlong. He went on to with the race by 1¼ lengths from Dick Turpin, with Canford Cliffs a further ½ length back in third place. The pre-race favourite St Nicholas Abbey finished in sixth place.

Makfi followed his 2000 Guineas success with a disappointing run in the St James's Palace Stakes at Royal Ascot, where he finished in seventh behind winner Canford Cliffs. He then faced seven rivals, including Goldikova and Paco Boy, in the Prix Jacques Le Marois. He took the lead with half a furlong to run and ran on to win by 2½ lengths from 4/6 favourite Goldikova, with Paco Boy just behind her in third. Makfi returned to Ascot for his final race, the Queen Elizabeth II Stakes. He started as the even money favourite, but could only finish in fifth place, about three lengths behind winner Poet's Voice.

== Assessment ==
Makfi was officially rated as the joint third best horse in the world in 2010, with a rating of 128. The only horses rated higher were Harbinger and Blame, making Makfi the top miler in the world that year.

== Stud career ==
After being treated for ringworm in October 2010 Makfi was retired to Tweenhills Stud in Gloucestershire. His 2012 fee was £25,000 and it remained the same for 2013.

Makfi's first crop of foals included the Poule d'Essai des Poulains winner Make Believe.

In late 2014 he transferred to the Haras de Bonneval in France for the 2015 covering season as part of a deal involving the Aga Khan and Qatar Bloodstock.

He was also shuttled to stand in New Zealand during the Southern hemisphere breeding season. He stood at Westbury Stud from 2011 to 2016 and his name was used when they sponsored a Group 1 race, the Makfi Challenge Stakes. His best progeny in New Zealand was Bonneval, winner of three Group 1 races (two in Australia) and the New Zealand Horse of the Year in both the 2017 and 2018 seasons.

=== Notable progeny ===
c = colt, f = filly, g = gelding, m = mare

Foaled	Name	Sex	Major wins
2012	Make Believe	c	2015 Poule d'Essai des Poulains; 2015 Prix de la Forêt
2012	Marky Mark	g	2015 Manawatu Sires Produce Stakes
2012	Sofia Rosa	f	2016 Australian Oaks (ATC)
2013	Bonneval (NZ)	f / m	2017 & 2018 New Zealand Horse of the Year; 2017 Sir Tristram Fillies Classic, Lowland Stakes, New Zealand Oaks, Australian Oaks (ATC), Feehan Stakes, Underwood Stakes
2017	Mkfancy	c	2019 Critérium de Saint-Cloud

== Pedigree ==
Pedigree of Makfi (GB), bay stallion, 2007
Sire Dubawi (IRE) 2002	Dubai Millennium (GB); 1996	Seeking the Gold	Mr. Prospector
Sire Dubawi (IRE) 2002	Dubai Millennium (GB); 1996	Seeking the Gold	Con Game
Sire Dubawi (IRE) 2002	Dubai Millennium (GB); 1996	Colorado Dancer	Shareef Dancer
Sire Dubawi (IRE) 2002	Dubai Millennium (GB); 1996	Colorado Dancer	Fall Aspen
Sire Dubawi (IRE) 2002	Zomaradah (GB); 1995	Deploy	Shirley Heights
Sire Dubawi (IRE) 2002	Zomaradah (GB); 1995	Deploy	Slightly Dangerous
Sire Dubawi (IRE) 2002	Zomaradah (GB); 1995	Jawaher	Dancing Brave
Sire Dubawi (IRE) 2002	Zomaradah (GB); 1995	Jawaher	High Tern
Dam Dhelaal (GB) 2002	Green Desert (USA); 1983	Danzig	Northern Dancer
Dam Dhelaal (GB) 2002	Green Desert (USA); 1983	Danzig	Pas de Nom
Dam Dhelaal (GB) 2002	Green Desert (USA); 1983	Foreign Courier	Sir Ivor
Dam Dhelaal (GB) 2002	Green Desert (USA); 1983	Foreign Courier	Courtly Dee
Dam Dhelaal (GB) 2002	Irish Valley (USA); 1982	Irish River	Riverman
Dam Dhelaal (GB) 2002	Irish Valley (USA); 1982	Irish River	Irish Star
Dam Dhelaal (GB) 2002	Irish Valley (USA); 1982	Green Valley	Val de Loir
Dam Dhelaal (GB) 2002	Irish Valley (USA); 1982	Green Valley	Sly Pola (Family: 16-c)
