= David Egan (jockey) =

Irish jockey (born 1999)

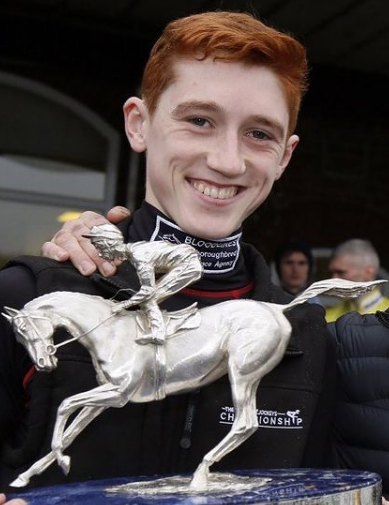
- David Egan in 2020

Personal information
- Born: 19 June 1999 (age 26) Kildare, Leinster, Ireland
- Occupation: Jockey

Horse racing career
- Sport: Horse racing

Major racing wins
- Irish St. Leger (2023); St Leger Stakes (2022); International Stakes (2021); Dubai Sheema Classic (2021); Saudi Cup (2021)

Significant horses
- Mishriff, Eldar Eldarov, Power Blue, Arizona Blaze

David Egan (born 19 June 1999) is an Irish jockey who is based in Britain and competes in flat racing. He was British champion apprentice in 2017. From 2019 to 2022 he was retained by owner Prince Faisal, for whom he won the 2021 Saudi Cup on Mishriff. Since July 2022 he has ridden freelance, and achieved two Classic victories on the Roger Varian trained Eldar Eldarov.

== Background ==
Egan was born in Kildare, Ireland. He comes from a racing background. His father John is a jockey, his mother Sandra Hughes trained the 2015 Irish Grand National winner Thunder And Roses, his grandfather is Irish trainer Dessie Hughes and his uncle is British champion jockey, Richard Hughes. His sister Alexandra Egan also became a jockey, having her first ride as an apprentice in July 2024. Egan rode out for his grandfather from the age of 13 and took part in pony racing. He also rode out for flat trainer Willie McCreery.

== Career ==
Having lived with his mother on The Curragh, Egan moved to Newmarket to join his father in 2015. He completed a four-week course at the British Racing School and was then apprenticed to trainer Roger Varian. In 2017, his second year as an apprentice jockey, he was champion apprentice jockey. Egan secured his first victory in a Group race on 2 August 2018, the day after he turned professional, when the Varian-trained Pilaster won the Group 2 Lillie Langtry Stakes at Goodwood. His first race in a Classic came in May 2019 when he rode favourite Qabala into third place in the 1000 Guineas Stakes. Egan's father rode outsider Garrel Glen into twelfth place in the same race. In June 2019 he had his first victory at Royal Ascot, when the Varian-trained Daahyeh won the Albany Stakes.

Having signed a retainer with owner Prince Faisal, Egan rode the John Gosden-trained Mishriff to his maiden victory at Nottingham in November 2019. In February 2021 the pair won the Saudi Cup at Riyadh, Saudi Arabia, before going on to win the Dubai Sheema Classic at Meydan Racecourse, Dubai, in March 2021. After coming third in the Coral Eclipse Stakes and second in the King George VI and Queen Elizabeth Stakes, the partnership secured their first British Group 1 victory in the International Stakes at York on 18 August 2021. On 2 July 2022 Mishriff was narrowly beaten into second place by Vadeni in the Eclipse Stakes at Sandown Park. It was to be Egan's last ride on Mishriff, as later that month his association with Prince Faisal came to an end.

Egan had his second Royal Ascot winner in 2022, when the Varian-trained Eldar Eldarov won the Queen's Vase. Eldar Eldarov then provided Egan with his first British classic success, winning the St Leger Stakes at Doncaster on 11 September 2022. In September 2023 Egan rode his first winner in Ireland when Eldar Eldarov beat favourite Kyprios to win the Irish St. Leger at the Curragh. In December 2023 he signed a two-contract to ride as first jockey for Kia Joorabchian's Amo Racing. The partnership made a successful start to the turf season when Egan won the Lincoln Handicap on 33/1 outsider Mr Professor on 23 March 2024.

During the 2024 and 2025 seasons, Egan won three Group races on Arizona Blaze, owned by Amo and trained by Adrian Murray. In May 2024, they took the Group 3 Marble Hill Stakes for two-year-olds at the Curragh. The following season, they won the Group 3 Prix Sigy at Chantilly before being narrowly beaten into second place in the Group 1 Commonwealth Cup at Royal Ascot. In July 2025, they won the Group 2 Sapphire Stakes at the Curragh.

== Major wins ==
United Kingdom

- International Stakes - (1) - Mishriff (2021)
- St Leger Stakes - (1) - Eldar Eldarov (2022)

(Republic of Ireland) Ireland

- Flying Five Stakes - (1) - Arizona Blaze (2025)
- Irish St. Leger - (1) - Eldar Eldarov (2023)
- Phoenix Stakes - (1) - Power Blue (2025)

(United Arab Emirates) UAE

- Dubai Sheema Classic - (1) - Mishriff (2021)
