= Fukushima Kinen =

Fukushima Kinen 福島記念
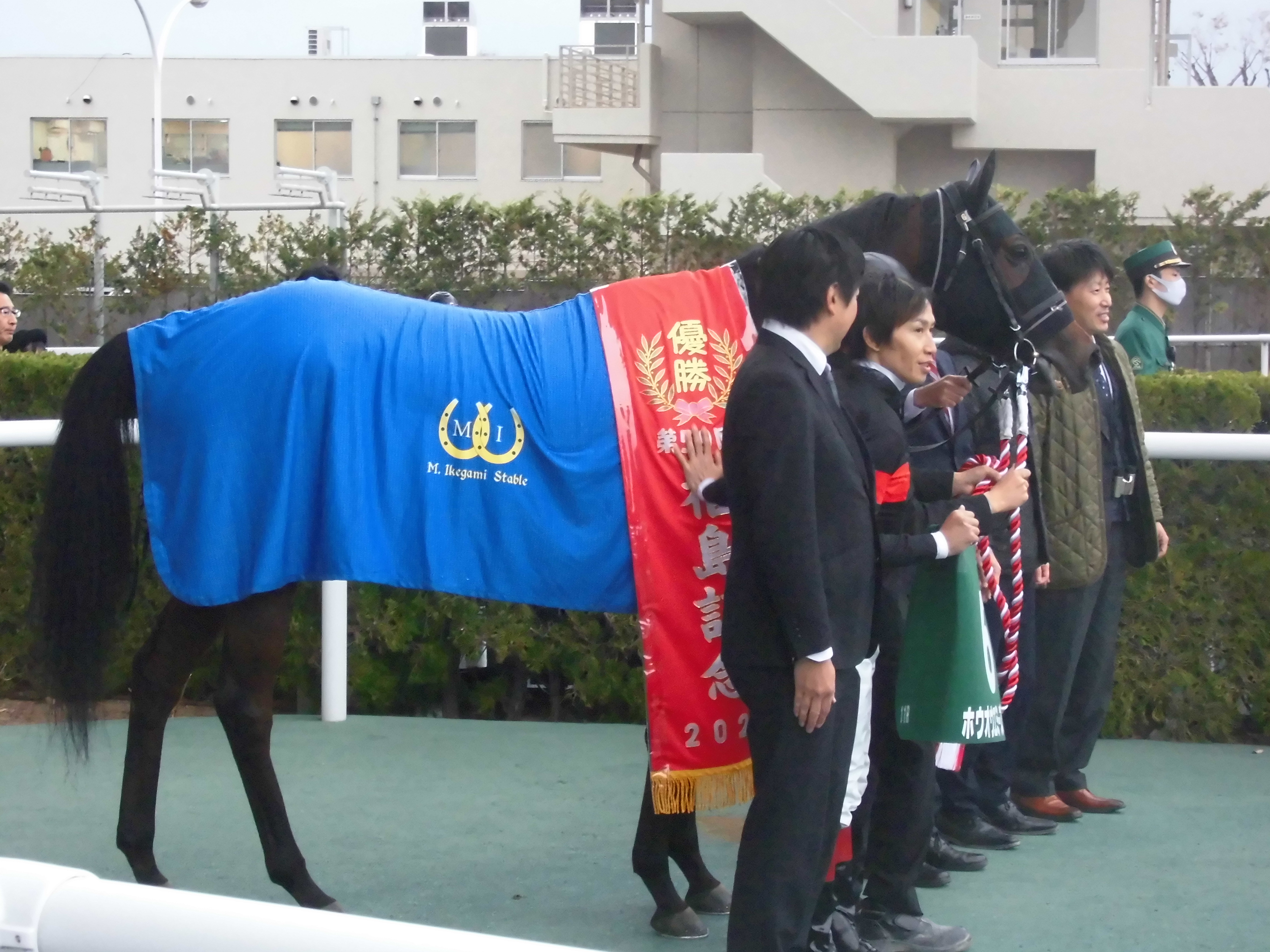
- 2023 Fukushima Kinen winner Ho O Emmy's
- Class: Grade 3
- Location: Fukushima Racecourse
- Inaugurated: 1965
- Race type: Thoroughbred Flat racing

Race information
- Distance: 2000 metres
- Surface: Turf
- Track: Right-handed
- Qualification: 3-y-o+
- Weight: Handicap
- Purse: ¥ 92,980,000 (as of 2025): 1st: ¥ 43,000,000; 2nd: ¥ 17,000,000; 3rd: ¥ 11,000,000

The Fukushima Kinen (Japanese 福島記念) is a Japanese Grade 3 horse race for Thoroughbreds aged three and over, run in November over a distance of 2000 metres on turf at Fukushima Racecourse.

It was first run in 1965 and has held Grade 3 status since 1984. The race was run at Niigata Racecourse in 1995, 1996 and 2011.

== Winners since 2000 ==
Nishino Tiamo winning the 2025 Fukushima Kinen

Year	Winner	Age	Jockey	Trainer	Owner	Time
2000	Going Suzuka	7	Junichi Serizawa	Mitsuru Hashida	Keiji Nagai	2:04.1
2001	Miyagi Rodrigo	7	Naohiro Onishi	Keiji Takaichi	Mitsuhiro Sugawara	1:59.0
2002	Win Blaze	5	Hatsuhiro Kowata	Yoshitada Munakata	Win	2:01.2
2003	Meisho Domenica	6	Hatsuhiro Kowata	Shigetada Takahashi	Yoshio Matsumoto	1:58.6
2004	Safety Emperor	5	Kodai Hasegawa	Yukiharu Ono	Minoru Ikeda	2:00.3
2005	Grass Bomber	5	Masaki Katsuura	Mitsuhiro Ogata	Hanzawa	2:01.2
2006	San Valentin	5	Hiroki Goto	Shozo Sasaki	Katsumi Yoshida	2:03.9
2007	Arco Senora	3	Eiji Nakadate	Shigenori Hatakeyama	Masakatsu Nakamura	2:00.6
2008	Manhattan Sky	4	Junichi Serizawa	Hidekazu Asami	Hidaka Breeders Union	2:00.1
2009	Sunny Sunday	3	Hayato Yoshida	Yoshiaki Tanihara	Moriyasu Miyazaki	1:58.6
2010	Dance In The More	8	Kyosuke Maruta	Ikuo Aizawa	Iwao Kinami	1:58.9
2011	Admire Cosmos	4	Hiroyuki Uemura	Mitsuru Hashida	Riichi Kondo	1:59.1
2012	Daiwa Falcon	5	Haruhiko Kawasu	Hiroyuki Uehara	Keizo Oshiro	1:59.5
2013	Daiwa Falcon	6	Haruhiko Kawasu	Hiroyuki Uehara	Keizo Oshiro	1:57.3
2014	Mitra	6	Mickael Barzalona	Kiyoshi Hagiwara	Katsumi Yoshida	1:58.1
2015	Yamakatsu Ace	3	Akihide Tsumura	Kaneo Ikezoe	Kazuo Yamada	2:02.5
2016	Maltese Apogee	4	Tomoharu Bushizawa	Masahiro Horii	Nagako Fujita	2:00.8
2017	Win Bright	3	Masami Matsuoka	Yoshihiro Hatakeyama	Win	2:00.2
2018	Stiffelio	4	Genki Maruyama	Hidetaka Otonashi	Shadai Race Horse	1:58.3
2019	Crescendo Love	5	Hiroyuki Uchida	Toru Hayashi	Hiroo Race	1:59.5
2020	Bio Spark	5	Kenichi Ikezoe	Tamio Hamada	Naoya Miyata	1:59.6
2021	Panthalassa	4	Yuji Hishida	Yoshito Yahagi	Hiroo Race	1:59.2
2022	Unicorn Lion	6	Yusaku Kokubun	Yoshito Yahagi	Lion Race Horse	2:00.2
2023	Ho O Emmy's	6	Hironobu Tanabe	Masakazu Ikegami	Yoshihisa Ozasa	2:00.9
2024	Arata	7	Takuya Ono	Yusuke Wada	Takamitsu Murata	2:00.7
2025	Nishino Ti Amo	4	Akihide Tsumura	Yuki Uehara	Shigeyuki Nishiyama	1:59.9
2026	Maglia Iridata	4	Keita Tosaki	Hiroyasu Tanaka	Sunday Racing	2:03.2

== Earlier winners ==
- 1965 - Wisteria
- 1966 - Theftway
- 1967 - Native Runner
- 1968 - Haku Sensho
- 1969 - Suijin
- 1970 - Suijin
- 1971 - Dash Ryu
- 1972 - Kikuno Happy
- 1973 - Okazakijo
- 1974 - Noboru Toko
- 1975 - Czar Turf
- 1976 - Western Bird
- 1977 - Diamante
- 1978 - Schlander
- 1979 - Funny Bird; My Elf (dead heat)
- 1980 - Hawaiian Image
- 1981 - Fuji Madonna
- 1982 - Neo Keystone
- 1983 - Sweet Carson
- 1984 - Suzu Parade
- 1985 - Blacksky
- 1986 - Running Free
- 1987 - Mr Brandy
- 1988 - Lake Black
- 1989 - Mr Brandy
- 1990 - Hashino Kenshiro
- 1991 - Yagura Stella
- 1992 - Arashi
- 1993 - Pegasus
- 1994 - Silk Greyish
- 1995 - Meiner Bridge
- 1996 - Maillot Jaune
- 1997 - T M Oarashi
- 1998 - Over The Wall
- 1999 - Port Brians

== See also ==
- Horse racing in Japan
- List of Japanese flat horse races
