= Mishriff =

Irish-bred, British-trained Thoroughbred racehorse

- Racing silks of A A Faisal
- Sire: Make Believe
- Grandsire: Makfi
- Dam: Contradict
- Damsire: Ravens Pass
- Sex: Stallion
- Foaled: 1 April 2017
- Country: Ireland
- Colour: Bay
- Breeder: Nawara Stud Limited
- Owner: Prince Abdul Rahman al Faisal (King Faisal's Grandson)
- Trainer: John Gosden; John & Thady Gosden (from 2021 summer)
- Record: 18: 7-4-3
- Earnings: £11,677,544

Major wins
- Newmarket Stakes (2020); Prix du Jockey Club (2020); Prix Guillaume d'Ornano (2020); Saudi Cup (2021); Dubai Sheema Classic (2021); International Stakes (2021); Timeform rating: 131
- Last updated on 8 November 2022

Mishriff (foaled 1 April 2017) is an Irish-bred, British-trained Thoroughbred racehorse. After showing some promise when winning one minor race as a two-year-old in 2019 he emerged as a top-class middle-distance performer in the following year, recording victories in the Newmarket Stakes, Prix du Jockey Club and Prix Guillaume d'Ornano. In the spring of 2021 he was campaigned internationally and won the second running of the Saudi Cup on dirt and the Dubai Sheema Classic on turf. On returning to Europe he was placed in both the Eclipse Stakes and the King George VI and Queen Elizabeth Stakes before winning the International Stakes. As of August 2022 he has earned the equivalent of over £11 million pounds in prize money.

== Background ==
Mishriff is a bay stallion with no white markings bred in Ireland by Nawara Stud Limited, the breeding operation of his owner Prince A A Faisal. He was sent into training with John Gosden at Clarehaven Stables in Newmarket, Suffolk.

He was from the first crop of foals sired by Make Believe who won the Poule d'Essai des Poulains and Prix de la Forêt in 2015. Mishriff's dam Contradict showed modest racing ability, winning one minor race from nine attempts. Her dam Acts of Grace was a half-sister to Invincible Spirit.

== Racing career ==
=== 2019: two-year-old season ===
Mishriff made his racecourse debut in a novice race (for horses with no more than two previous wins) over seven furlongs on heavy ground at Yarmouth Racecourse on 14 October in which he was ridden by Rob Havlin. Starting the 5/2 second favourite he started slowly before making steady progress in the latter stages to finish fourth of the ten runners behind Society Lion, beaten four lengths by the winner. Frankie Dettori took the ride when Mishriff started 7/4 favourite for a similar event over one mile at Newbury Racecourse eleven days later and came home third behind Acquitted and Waleydd. On his final start of the season the colt started 5/6 favourite for a maiden race over one mile at Nottingham Racecourse on 6 November. Ridden by David Egan he tracked the leaders before taking the lead two furlongs from the finish and pulled clear of his opponents to win "easily" by ten lengths.

=== 2020: three-year-old season ===
For his first run of 2020 Mishriff was sent to Saudi Arabia to contest the Saudi Derby over 1600 metres on dirt at Riyadh on 29 February. With Egan in the saddle he went off at odds of 16/1 and recovered from a poor start to finish second of the thirteen runners, two and a quarter lengths behind the Japanese-trained winner Full Flat. The 2020 flat racing season in England and Ireland was disrupted by the COVID-19 pandemic and Mishriff did not make his reappearance after his trip to Arabia until 6 June when he contested the Newmarket Stakes over ten furlongs at Newmarket Racecourse. He went off at odds of 10/1 and was regarded as the stable's second string behind the more highly regarded Waldkonig. After tracking the leaders in the early stages, Egan sent his mount into the lead three furlongs from the finish and Mishriff quickly opened up a clear advantage to win by four lengths from Volkan Star. After the race Gosden commented "It is rather what I expected really. Mishriff had a run in Saudi Arabia and was a fitter horse. He enjoyed the ground and the trip, the track is perfect and he has been training well at home".

On 5 July Mishriff was sent to France and started at odds of 7.5/1 for the Group 1 Prix du Jockey Club over 2000 metres at Chantilly Racecourse. Owing to the quarantine restrictions, which meant that Egan would have been required to self-isolate after returning to Britain, Gosden opted to employ the locally based jockey Ioritz Mendizabal who had previously won the race on Vision d'Etat in 2008. The other fifteen runners included Victor Ludorum, Gold Trip (Prix Greffulhe), Pao Alto (Prix La Force), The Summit (Prix de Fontainebleau), Ecrivain (Prix des Chênes), Chachnak (Prix de Guiche), Ocean Antlantique (Prix de Suresnes), Pisanello (Prix Omnium II) and Fort Myers (Star Appeal Stakes). After racing just behind the leaders, Mishriff was switched to the outside to obtain a clear run in the straight. He produced a strong late charge to take the lead in the last 100 metres and won "readily" by one and three quarter lengths from The Summit. Gosden commented "He's got a good attitude and I thought his last 100 meters were his best of the whole race... On pedigree you'd think he'd stay at this trip but he didn't look like he was stopping either" while Mendizabal said "I was told that he carries his head quite low and I just needed to gather him together halfway up the home straight, but when he picked up, he had it won in two strides... he must be a real crack."

In August Mishriff returned to France for the Group 2 Prix Guillaume d'Ornano over 2000 metres on heavy ground at Deauville Racecourse and started the odds-on favourite against three opponents namely Victor Ludorum, The Summit and Dream Works (winner of the Listed Prix Ridgway). Ridden by Dettori he took the lead 400 metres from the finish and drew away in the closing stages to win in "impressive" fashion by four and a half lengths. Dettori commented "He's a horse that likes soft ground. He finished his race strong in the Jockey Club, so I said 'come and catch me if you can'... I made sure it was a true test and he came out on top. It's nice proving he is a very good horse... So far so good, he’s done nothing wrong."

Mishriff ended his season in the Champion Stakes at Ascot Racecourse on 17 October. He started the 4/1 second choice in the betting but after tracking the leader he faded badly in the straight and came home eighth of the ten runners behind Addeybb.

In the 2020 World's Best Racehorse Rankings, Mishriff was rated on 120, making him the equal 40th best racehorse in the world.

=== 2021: four-year-old season ===
==== Spring ====
As in the previous year, Mishriff began his 2021 campaign at Riyadh when he contested the second running of the Saudi Cup and went off the 8/1 third choice in the betting behind the American-trained contenders Knicks Go and Charlatan (Arkansas Derby, Malibu Stakes). The best fancied of the other eleven runners were Tacitus and Chuwa Wizard (Champions Cup). After tracking the leaders he turned into the straight in third place behind Charlatan and Knicks Go before staying on strongly in the straight to overhaul Charlatan in the closing stages and winning by a length. After the race Egan said "He jumped very well, probably the best he's ever jumped, I squeezed him along for the first 50 yards and I was actually surprised how well he was going... Around the crest of the bend, when we started turning, was the only kind of worrying time. When they started quickening, I wasn't sure if I was going to get him back rolling again. But once we got going into the straight, I always knew I was going to mow them down".

At Meydan Racecourse in Dubai on 27 March Mishriff returned to the turf for the 2400 metres Dubai Sheema Classic and went off the 4/1 third favourite behind the Irish colt Mogul and the Japanese mare Chrono Genesis with the best fancied of the other six runners being Walton Street (Dubai City of Gold), Loves Only You and Channel Maker (Sword Dancer Stakes). After being restrained by Egan in the early stages Mishriff produced a sustained run on the outside in the straight and prevailed in a close finish, beating Chrono Genesis by a neck with Loves Only You a neck away in third place. John Gosden's son Thady, who had just gone into a training partnership with his father, commented "Over a mile and a half for the first time, if you try to send him to the lead to get him up there, there’s a pretty significant risk you’re going to end up setting him alight – and the race would be over before it really started. So David obviously made the correct decision to drop him in and switch him off and strike when he did. He’s a very versatile horse, and a brilliant and tough horse as well – and he definitely wasn’t for beating today".

==== Summer ====
On his first run of the season in Europe, Mishriff contested the Eclipse Stakes over ten furlongs on good-to-soft ground at Sandown Park on 3 July. After settling in second place he took the lead approaching the last quarter mile but was soon overtaken and finished third of the four runners behind St Mark's Basilica and Addeybb. Three weeks later Mishriff moved back up in distance for the King George VI and Queen Elizabeth Stakes over one and a half miles at Ascot Racecourse. He raced at the rear of the field before moving up on the outside to make a strong challenge in the straight but was unable to overhaul the three-year-old Adayar and was beaten into second place.

At York Racecourse on 18 August Mishriff started the 9/4 favourite for the 50th running of the International Stakes over ten and a half furlongs, with his six opponents including Love, Alcohol Free, Mac Swiney, Mohaafeth (Hampton Court Stakes), Alenquer (King Edward VII Stakes) and Juan Elcano (Wolferton Stakes). He raced in third place as Mac Swiney set the pace before moving up to take the lead three furlongs from the finish and drew right away in the closing stages to win in "impressive" style by six lengths from Alenquer. David Egan commented "I couldn't believe how well I was travelling approaching the three-pole. I had it in the back of my mind how well he stays the mile and a quarter on a flat track. I got him in a nice rhythm, relaxed, that was the key and we were in the exact spot we wanted to be. It couldn't have gone better and I was in awe how far clear he was passing the line. He's a real champion and I think he's only getting better."

== Pedigree ==
Pedigree of Mishriff (IRE), bay colt, 2017
Sire Make Believe (GB) 2012	Makfi (GB); 2007	Dubawi (IRE)	Dubai Millennium (GB)
Sire Make Believe (GB) 2012	Makfi (GB); 2007	Dubawi (IRE)	Zomaradah (GB)
Sire Make Believe (GB) 2012	Makfi (GB); 2007	Dhelaal	Green Desert (USA)
Sire Make Believe (GB) 2012	Makfi (GB); 2007	Dhelaal	Irish Valley (USA)
Sire Make Believe (GB) 2012	Rosie's Posy (IRE); 1999	Suave Dancer (USA)	Green Dancer
Sire Make Believe (GB) 2012	Rosie's Posy (IRE); 1999	Suave Dancer (USA)	Suavite
Sire Make Believe (GB) 2012	Rosie's Posy (IRE); 1999	My Branch (GB)	Distant Relative (IRE)
Sire Make Believe (GB) 2012	Rosie's Posy (IRE); 1999	My Branch (GB)	Pay The Bank
Dam Contradict (GB) 2010	Raven's Pass (USA); 2005	Elusive Quality	Gone West
Dam Contradict (GB) 2010	Raven's Pass (USA); 2005	Elusive Quality	Touch of Greatness
Dam Contradict (GB) 2010	Raven's Pass (USA); 2005	Ascutney	Lord At War (ARG)
Dam Contradict (GB) 2010	Raven's Pass (USA); 2005	Ascutney	Right Word
Dam Contradict (GB) 2010	Acts of Grace (USA); 2003	Bahri	Riverman
Dam Contradict (GB) 2010	Acts of Grace (USA); 2003	Bahri	Wasnah
Dam Contradict (GB) 2010	Acts of Grace (USA); 2003	Rafha (GB)	Kris
Dam Contradict (GB) 2010	Acts of Grace (USA); 2003	Rafha (GB)	Eljazzi (IRE) (Family 7-a)
