= Panthalassa (horse) =

Japanese thoroughbred racehorse

Panthalassa パンサラッサ
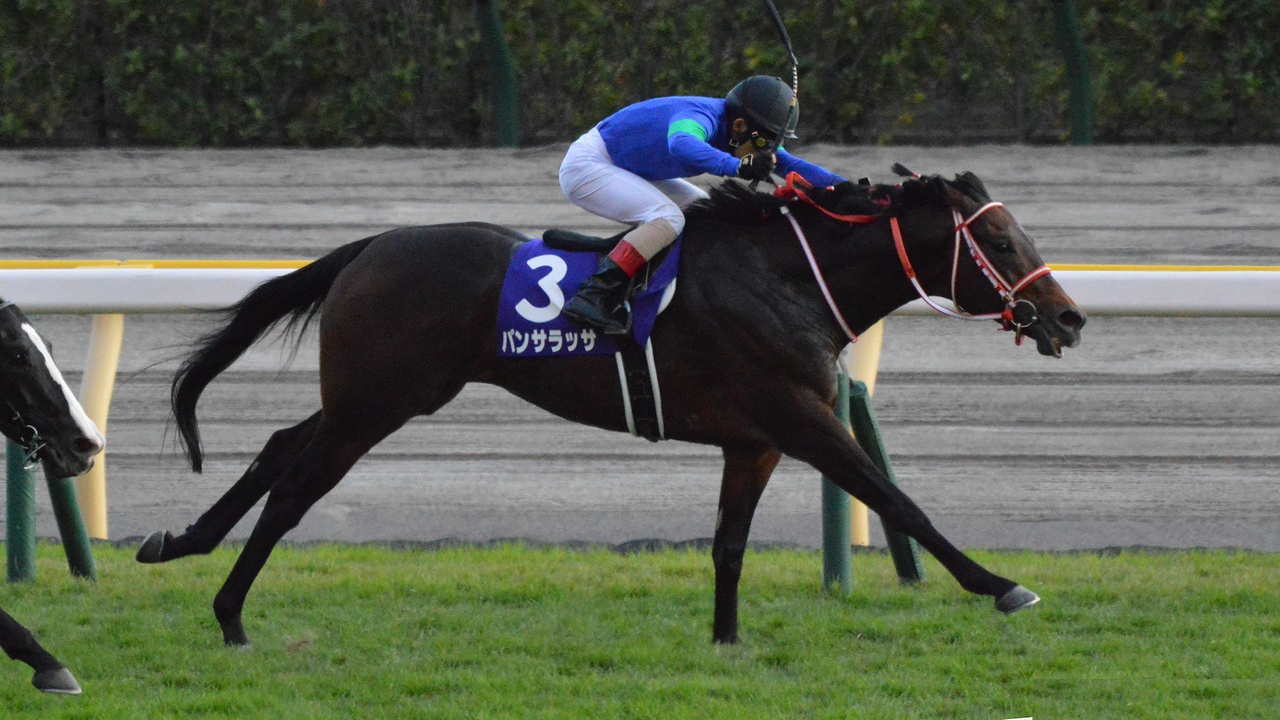
- Panthalassa at the 2022 Autumn Tenno Sho
- Sire: Lord Kanaloa
- Grandsire: King Kamehameha
- Dam: Miss Pemberley
- Damsire: Montjeu
- Sex: Stallion
- Foaled: February 1, 2017 (age 9)
- Country: Japan
- Colour: Bay
- Breeder: Hidenori Kimura
- Owner: Hiroo Race Co. Ltd.
- Racing colours
- Trainer: Yoshito Yahagi
- Jockey: Yutaka Yoshida
- Record: 27: 7-6-0
- Earnings: 1,844,663,200 JPY; Japan：301,700,000 JPY; Abroad：1,542,963,200 JPY （UAE）1,950,000 USD （SAU）10,000,000 USD

Major wins
- Fukushima Kinen (2021); Nakayama Kinen (2022); Dubai Turf (2022); Saudi Cup (2023)
- Last updated on November 26, 2023

Panthalassa (Japanese: パンサラッサ, Hepburn: Pansarassa; Chinese: 本初之海; foaled March 1, 2017) is a retired Japanese race horse whose main victories include the 2022 Dubai Turf and the 2023 Saudi Cup .

The name of the horse comes from the prehistoric superocean that surrounded Pangea, derived from his sire's name, which is from a God of the seas. Panthalassa is the first Japanese trained-horse to win the Saudi Cup, which has the largest purse in the world.

== Racing career ==
=== 2019: Two-year old season ===
Panthalassa made his debut with Ryusei Sakai as his jockey at a mile-long maiden race held at the Hanshin Racecourse on September 21, where he came in 6th place behind Lotus Land. After coming in 2nd place at another maiden race at Hanshin behind Akai Ito, his first victory came at a 2000-meter long maiden race held at the Kyoto Racecourse on October 12. Panthalassa would race his first group race at the end of the year at the Hopeful Stakes, but wound up finishing at 6th place behind Contrail, who was from the same stable.

=== 2020: Three-year old season ===
Panthalassa started his three-year-old season with the Wakagoma Stakes, finishing 4th. He then ran 9th in the Yayoi Sho Deep Impact Kinen. Panthalassa clinched his 2nd victory on June 20 in an allowance race held at the Hanshin Race Course and came in 2nd at the Radio Nikkei Sho two weeks later. In autumn, the horse entered the Kobe Shimbun Hai and again lost to Contrail in 12th place. Panthalassa then lost three other listed races. He finished the season by running in his first dirt race at the Shiwasu Stakes, where he was favored but came in 11th.

=== 2021: Four-year old season ===
Panthalassa returned to the turf with his first race being the Kammonkyo Stakes on February 7, where he came in 2nd by a neck behind World Winds. He then entered the Nakayama Kinen but finished 7th and was scratched from the Yomiuri Milers Cup after he was seen limping.

On October 17, he scored his first victory in over a year at the October Stakes (Tokyo, 2000m turf) with Yutaka Yoshida as his jockey, who took a front-running approach in this race. Four weeks later on November 14, Panthalassa was sent to the Fukushima Kinen (Fukushima, 2000m turf), this time with Yuji Hishida as his jockey. He started the race as the front runner, setting the pace of 57.3 seconds for the first 1000 meters, and kept the lead until finishing the race with a four-length gap, marking his first win in a group race. His victory coincided with the Queen Elizabeth II Cup, where Akai Ito, the same horse that beat him in his second race, won.

=== 2022: Five-year old season ===
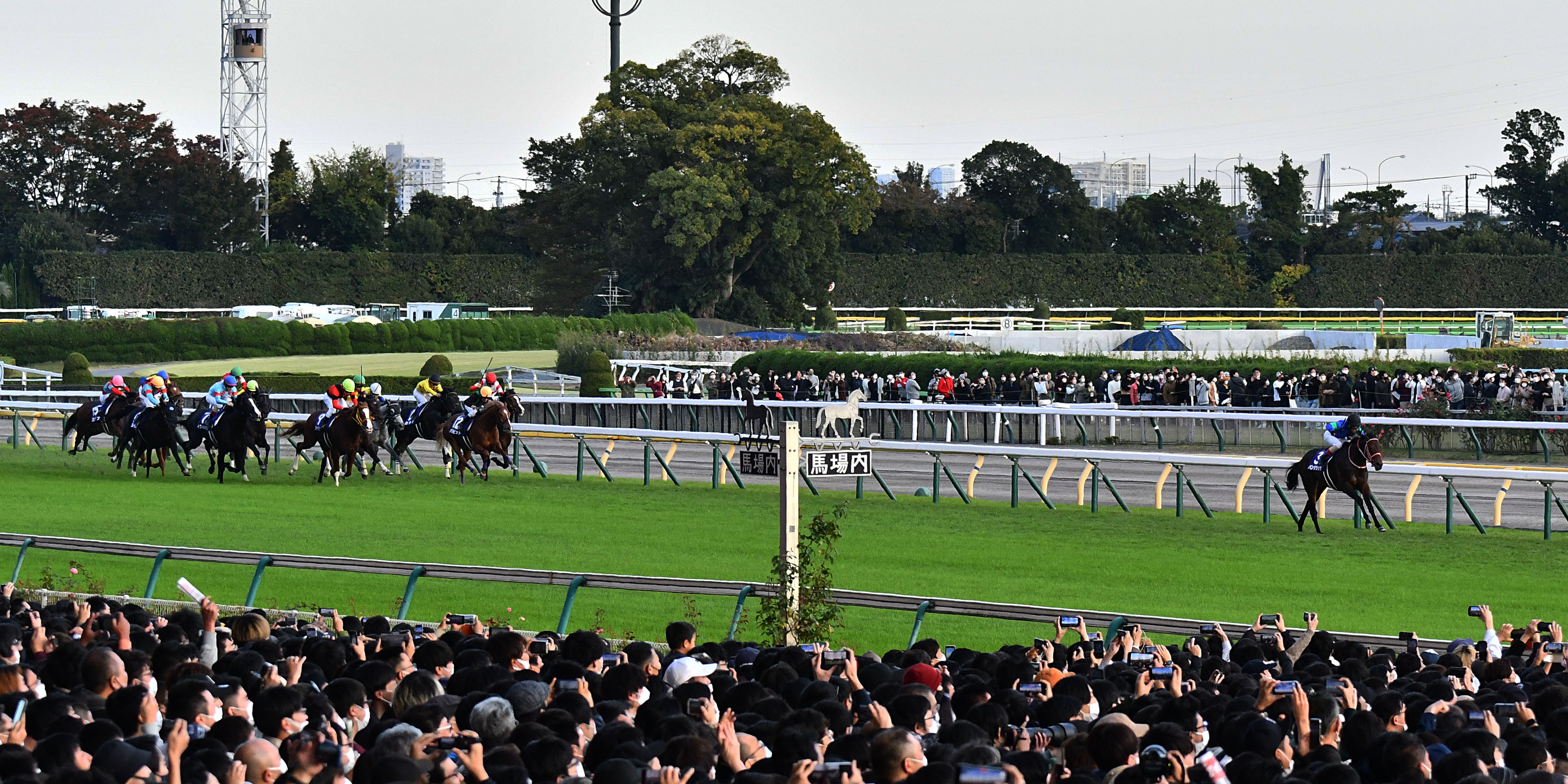
Panthalassa running the home stretch of the Autumn Tenno Sho

For his first race of the season, Panthalassa again entered the Nakayama Kinen. He was the 2nd most favored, and after again taking the lead from the start and setting a pace of 57.6s/1000m, he kept the lead to the finish line, marking his second group victory.

Panthalassa then was sent to his first race abroad to Dubai, where he entered the Dubai Turf. He started well and kept a length lead until the final stretch, where Lord North closed the gap. The race ended with the two horses and Vin de Garde finishing at almost the same time. In a photo finish, Panthalassa and Lord North were both declared the winner, giving Panthalassa his first GI victory. This was also the first GI victory for the horse's owner, Hiroo Racing. For Panthalassa's jockey, Yutaka Yoshida, this was the first foreign GI title he won and his first GI title since the Mile Championship Nambu Hai in 2010 with Oro Meister. After the race, Yahagi commented that he was planning to send Panthalassa to the Prince of Wales's Stakes, as Lord North was also being planned to race there.

However, Panthalassa did not enter the British race and instead entered the Sapporo Kinen on August 21. This race saw the horse become the favorite over other contenders such as Jack d'Or, who had won that year's Kinko Sho in record time, as well as last year's winner Sodashi. Panthalassa could not take the lead at first and started the race in second but quickly took the lead by a narrow margin. Panthalassa attempted to widen the gap at the final stretch but was caught by Jack d'Or and finished second.

On October 26, Yoshito Yahagi announced that he had accepted the invitation to that year's Hong Kong Cup and that the horse would head to Sha Tin after the Tenno Sho.

Four days after the announcement was made, the horse competed in the Autumn edition of the Tenno Sho, held at the Tokyo Racecourse. Panthalassa, who was the 7th most favored, started from gate #3 and quickly took the lead. He covered the first 1000m in 57.4 seconds, the same time that Silence Suzuka made in his ill-fated, final race in 1998. He kept a wide lead of about 15 to 20 lengths even in the final stretch, only for Equinox, the favorite, to catch him at the final stretch as he covered the last 3 furlongs in 32.7 seconds, finishing second.

Panthalassa finished the season in the Hong Kong Cup as previously announced, running 10th.

=== 2023: Six-year old season ===
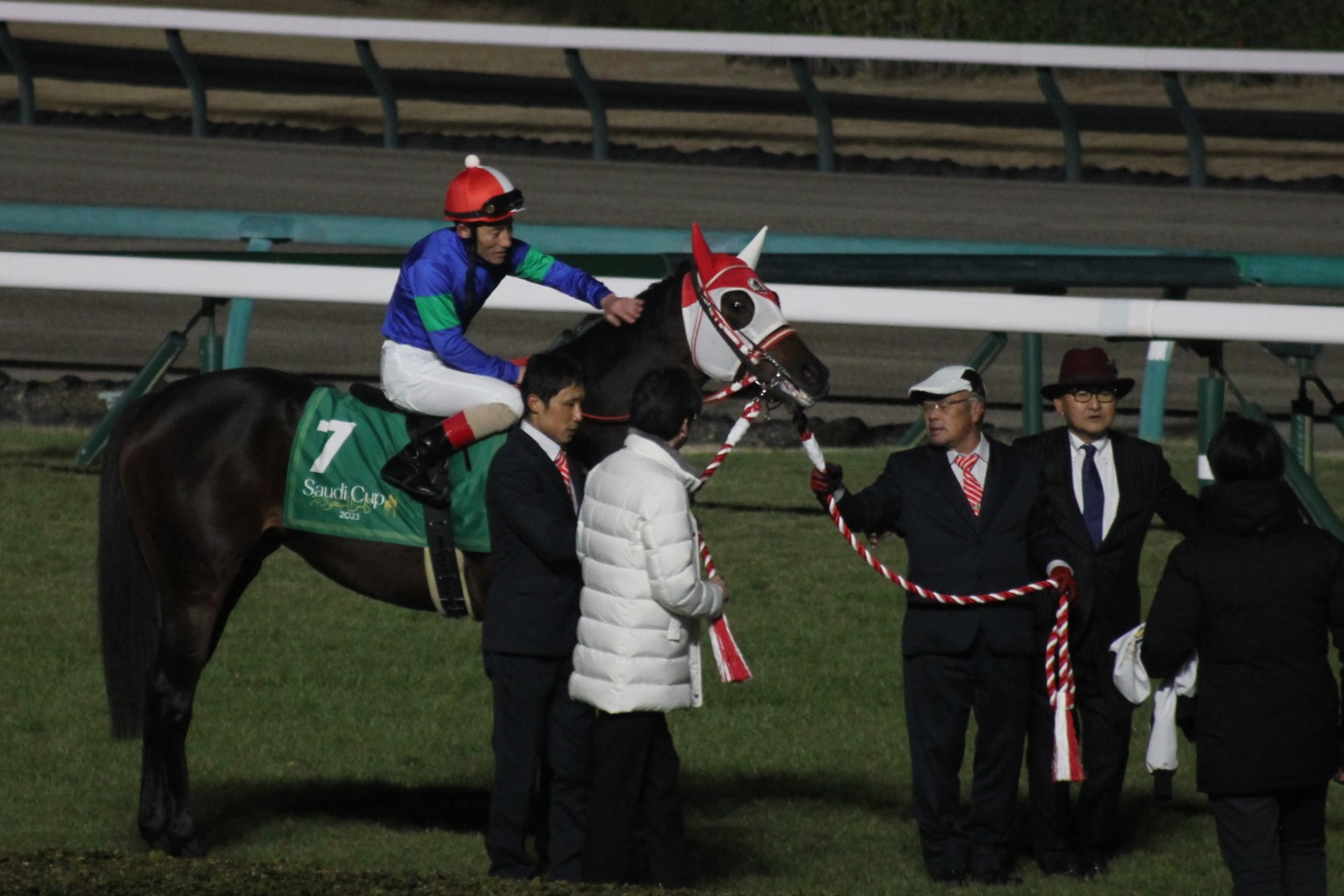
Panthalassa at his retirement ceremony

It was announced at the end of 2022 that the horse would be sent to the Saudi Cup as his next race, and the horse was entered as planned. This was the first dirt GI race for Panthalassa, but he broke well from the inside and took the lead. He ran the first 800 meters at a high pace of 45 seconds, but the other horses followed him closely as they entered the final stretch. The horse was struggling in the final furlong but persisted, winning by 3/4-lengths over Country Grammer, who was coming in from the outside. His victory marked the first Japanese-trained horse ever to win the Saudi Cup, earning him the US$10 million purse, which is the highest for any race in the world. This race also made Panthalassa the only Japanese horse to win both dirt and turf international GI races. (Note: There are many winners in turf GI races, but the only dirt GI race winner prior to Panthalassa was the 2021 Breeders' Cup Distaff winner Marche Lorraine.)

Panthalassa was then sent to the Dubai World Cup. However, he started from the furthest outside gate and was unable to take the lead from Remorse, resulting in the horse sinking into the pack by the fourth corner, finishing 10th.

It was then announced that the horse was going to be sent to the Sussex Stakes and later the International Stakes in the United Kingdom, but the plan was scrapped after he contracted desmitis.

Panthalassa returned to the turf for the Japan Cup on November 26. He took the lead and ran the first 1000 meters in 57.6 seconds and held a 20-length lead at one point but lost momentum and finished 12th. On the day after the Japan Cup, it was announced that that race was going to be Panthalassa's last race. Trainer Yoshito Yahagi commented, "The horse showed no problems after the race, but we had already planned to retire him by the end of this year, so perhaps this was a good stopping point. Otherwise there wouldn't be one if we want more and more. We learned a lot (from Panthalassa). We can never understand horses. He was very different from Contrail (the winner of 5 GI races including the Japanese Triple Crown, also trained by Yahagi) who is the same age as him, but we never thought he'd go this far".

A retirement ceremony was planned to be held on December 23 at Nakayama Racecourse, but was postponed to January 8 of the following year after the horse became sick. On January 8, the retirement ceremony of Panthalassa was held after all races at Nakayama Racecourse concluded.

== Racing statistics ==
The following statistics is based on information listed on JBIS search, netkeiba.com, Hong Kong Jockey Club, Sakab Jockey Club, Racing Post, the Emirates Racing Authority, and Total Performance Data as of November 26, 2023. All odds are written in the Japanese style.

Date	Racecourse	Name	Group	Track and Distance	Entry	PP	Odds (Favored)	Finished	Time	Jockey	Winner (2nd Place)
2019.9.21	Hanshin	Maiden race		Turf 1600m	15	13	7.0（4th）	6th	1:38.0	Ryusei Sakai	Lotus Land
9.28	Hanshin	Maiden Race		Turf 2000m	7	1	16.4（4th）	2nd	2:02.6	Ryusei Sakai	Akai Ito
10.12	Kyoto	Maiden Race		Turf 2000m	12	8	5.4（2nd）	1st	2:08.4	Ryusei Sakai	(Satono Venus)
12.7	Hanshin	Erica Sho		Turf 2000m	11	8	13.2（6th）	6th	2:01.2	Kenichi Ikezoe	Hygge
12.28	Nakayama	Hopeful Stakes	GI	Turf 2000m	13	9	173.4（12th）	6th	2:02.7	Ryusei Sakai	Contrail
2020. 1.26	Kyoto	Wakagoma Stakes		Turf 2000m	6	6	8.2（5th）	4th	2:02.9	Ryusei Sakai	Kevin
3.8	Nakayama	Yayoi Sho Deep impact Kinen	GII	Turf 2000m	11	3	16.3（5th）	9th	2:04.1	Ryusei Sakai	Satono Flag
6.20	Hanshin	3YO+ Allowance (1 win)	Allowance	Turf 2000m	12	8	6.2（3rd）	1st	2:00.0	Kouhei Matsuyama	(Deep King)
7.5	Fukushima	Radio Nikkei Sho	GIII	Turf 1800m	12	11	15.8（7th）	2nd	1:48.1	Kousei Miura	Babbitt
9.27	Chukyo	Kobe Shimbun Hai	GII	Turf 2200m	18	10	67.9（10th）	12th	2:13.9	Ryusei Sakai	Contrail
10.18	Tokyo	October Stakes	L	Turf 2000m	16	14	6.9（4th）	2nd	1:59.6	Yusuke Fujioka	Territorial
11.21	Hanshin	Andromeda Stakes	L	Turf 2000m	15	8	6.4（3rd）	4th	1:59.3	Ryusei Sakai	Admire Virgo
12.12	Nakayama	Shiwasu Stakes	L	Dirt 1800m	16	8	4.6（1st）	11th	1:53.6	Keita Tosaki	Taiki Ferveur
2021.2.7	Kokura	Kammonkyo Stakes	OP	Turf 2000m	11	8	4.0（3rd）	2nd	2:00.5	Yuji Hishida	World Winds
2.28	Nakayama	Nakayama Kinen	GII	Turf 1800m	14	12	27.4（9th）	7th	1:45.7	Kousei Miura	Hishi Iguazu
4.25	Hanshin	Yomiuri Milers Cup	GII	Turf 1600m	15	3		DSQ		Ryusei Sakai	Cadence Call
10.17	Tokyo	October Stakes	L	Turf 2000m	18	2	10.9（5th）	1st	2:00.0	Yutaka Yoshida	(Precious Blue)
11.14	Fukushima	Fukushima Kinen	GIII	Turf 2000m	16	8	9.0（5th）	1st	1:59.2	Yuji Hishida	(Humidor)
12.26	Nakayama	Arima Kinen	GI	Turf 2500m	16	2	45.5（8th）	13th	2:34.4	Yuji Hishida	Efforia
2022.2.27	Nakayama	Nakayama Kinen	GII	Turf 1800m	16	5	4.4（2nd）	1st	1:46.4	Yutaka Yoshida	（Karate）
3.26	Meydan	Dubai Turf	G1	Turf 1800m	14	11	4.5（2nd）	1st	1:45.77	Yutaka Yoshida	Lord North (dh)
6.26	Hanshin	Takarazuka Kinen	GI	Turf 2000m	17	11	10.2（6th）	8th	2:10.8	Yutaka Yoshida	Titleholder
8.21	Sapporo	Sapporo Kinen	GII	Turf 2000m	16	3	3.3（2nd）	2nd	2:01.2	Yutaka Yoshida	Jack d'Or
10.30	Tokyo	Tenno Sho (Autumn)	GI	Turf 2000m	15	3	22.8（7th）	2nd	1:57.6	Yutaka Yoshida	Equinox
12.11	Sha Tin	Hong Kong Cup	G1	Turf 2000m	12	1	5.8（3rd）	10th	2:01.98	Yutaka Yoshida	Romantic Warrior
2023.2.25	KAA	Saudi Cup	G1	Dirt 1800m	13	7	17.0（6th）	1st	1:50.80	Yutaka Yoshida	(Country Grammer)
3.25	Meydan	Dubai World Cup	G1	Dirt 2000m	15	9	5.7（2nd）	10th	2:07.20	Yutaka Yoshida	Ushba Tesoro
11.26	Tokyo	Japan Cup	GI	Turf 2400m	18	8	46.4（7th）	12th	2:24.0	Yutaka Yoshida	Equinox

== Stud career ==
Since 2024, Panthalassa is standing stud at the Arrow Stud in Shinhidaka, Hokkaido, with a service fee of 3,000,000JPY in 2024. In addition, he is also a shuttle stallion where he stands stud at the Yulong Stud located at Mangalore, Victoria during the Summer season.

== Pedigree ==
- "*" indicates that the horse was brought to Japan

Pedigree of Panthalassa
Sire Lord Kanaloa 2008 b.	King Kamehameha; 2001 b.	Kingmambo	Mr. Prospector
Sire Lord Kanaloa 2008 b.	King Kamehameha; 2001 b.	Kingmambo	Miesque
Sire Lord Kanaloa 2008 b.	King Kamehameha; 2001 b.	*Manfath	*Last Tycoon
Sire Lord Kanaloa 2008 b.	King Kamehameha; 2001 b.	*Manfath	Pilot Bird
Sire Lord Kanaloa 2008 b.	Lady Blossom; 1996 b.	Storm Cat	Storm Bird
Sire Lord Kanaloa 2008 b.	Lady Blossom; 1996 b.	Storm Cat	Terlingua
Sire Lord Kanaloa 2008 b.	Lady Blossom; 1996 b.	*Saratoga Dew	Cormorant
Sire Lord Kanaloa 2008 b.	Lady Blossom; 1996 b.	*Saratoga Dew	Super Luna
Dam *Miss Pemberley 2002 b.	Montjeu; 1996 b.	Sadler's Wells	Northern Dancer
Dam *Miss Pemberley 2002 b.	Montjeu; 1996 b.	Sadler's Wells	Fairy Bridge
Dam *Miss Pemberley 2002 b.	Montjeu; 1996 b.	Floripedes	Top Ville
Dam *Miss Pemberley 2002 b.	Montjeu; 1996 b.	Floripedes	Toute Cy
Dam *Miss Pemberley 2002 b.	Stitching; 1992 b.	*High Estate	Shirley Heights
Dam *Miss Pemberley 2002 b.	Stitching; 1992 b.	*High Estate	Regal Beauty
Dam *Miss Pemberley 2002 b.	Stitching; 1992 b.	Itching	Thatching
Dam *Miss Pemberley 2002 b.	Stitching; 1992 b.	Itching	Alligatrix
