= King Abdulaziz Racetrack =

Horse racing venue in Riyadh, Saudi Arabia

Coordinates: 24.985861°N 46.785194°E

- Interactive map of King Abdulaziz Racetrack
- Location: Riyadh, Saudi Arabia
- Date opened: January 2003
- Course type: Flat
- Notable races: Saudi Cup

King Abdulaziz Racetrack, officially named King Abdul Aziz Equestrian Square (Arabic: ميدان الملك عبد العزيز للفروسية) is a horse racing venue in Riyadh in Saudi Arabia. The current track opened in January 2003. The richest thoroughbred horse race, the Saudi Cup, is held at the track.

== History ==
The first horse racing venue in Saudi Arabia was built in 1965 in the Marat district in Riyadh. The track was too small for arranging international races, and was eventually moved to Riyadh Janadria, under the supervision of Abdullah bin Abdul Aziz, the heir apparent of Saudi Arabia at the time. The new track was completed in January 2003, and was officially named King Abdul Aziz Equestrian Square. It is also the largest horse racing venue in Saudi Arabia.

Races are held at the track from September to April.

== The track ==
The venue's main track is a 2000-meter dirt track, with a width of 24 meters. The races are run counter-clockwise. In January 2020, an 1800-meter turf track was added to the venue.

== Races ==
Since 2020, the track's biggest race is the Saudi Cup, which qualifies as the richest thoroughbred horse race in the world, with a $20 million purse.

=== Group 1 ===
- Saudi Cup - dirt 1,800m
- Neom Turf Cup - turf 2,100m

=== Group 2 ===
- Red Sea Turf Handicap - turf 3,000m
- Riyadh Dirt Sprint - dirt 1,200m
- 1351 Turf Sprint - turf 1,351m

=== Group 3 ===
- Saudi Derby - dirt 1,600m 3yo

=== other races ===
- Saudi International Handicap - turf 2,100m, for non International Cataloguing Standards Committee part I countries and regions
- International Jockey Challenge Cup - jockeys competition

== See also ==
- Horses in Saudi Arabia
