= 1998 in sports =

The following events happened in world sport in the year 1998.

== Alpine skiing ==
- Alpine Skiing World Cup
  - Men's overall season champion: Hermann Maier, Austria
  - Women's overall season champion: Katja Seizinger, Germany

== American football ==
- Super Bowl XXXII – the Denver Broncos (AFC) won 31–24 over the Green Bay Packers (NFC)
  - Location: San Diego Stadium
  - Attendance: 68,912
  - MVP: Terrell Davis, RB (Denver)
- Rose Bowl (1997 season):
  - The Michigan Wolverines won 21–16 over the Washington State Cougars to win the AP Poll national championship
  - The Orange Bowl was the original venue for the championship game, but the Big Ten Conference was not a part of the Bowl Alliance, so the game instead featured the #2 Nebraska Cornhuskers and the #3 Tennessee Volunteers
- January 13 – ABC and ESPN negotiate a $1.15 billion per season contract to keep Monday Night Football.
- December 13 – The Baltimore Ravens and Minnesota Vikings return an NFL record 3 kickoff returns for touchdowns.

== Artistic gymnastics ==
- 1998 Summer Goodwill Games - held in New York City, United States
  - Mixed pairs champions: China (Ling Jie, Huang Xu)
  - Women's all-around champion: Dominique Moceanu, United States
  - Women's vault champion: Vanessa Atler, United States
  - Women's uneven bars champion: Svetlana Khorkina, Russian Federation
  - Women's balance beam champion: Kristen Maloney, United States
  - Women's floor exercise champion: Vanessa Atler, United States
  - Men's all-around champion: Ivan Ivankov, Belarus
  - Men's vault champion: Sergei Fedorchenko, Kazakhstan
  - Men's floor exercise champion: Alexei Nemov, Russian Federation
  - Men's parallel bars champion: Huang Xu, China
  - Men's pommel horse champion: Nikolai Kryukov, Russian Federation
  - Men's still rings champion: Chris Lamorte, United States
  - Men's horizontal bar champion: Ivan Ivankov, Belarus
- 1998 European Gymnastics Championships - held in Saint Petersburg, Russia
  - Women's team champions: Romania
  - Women's all-around champion: Svetlana Khorkina, Russian Federation
  - Women's vault champion: Adrienn Varga, Hungary
  - Women's uneven bars champion:Svetlana Khorkina, Russian Federation
  - Women's balance beam champion: Evgenia Kuznetsova, Russian Federation
  - Women's floor exercise champion: (tied) Corina Ungureanu, Romania / Svetlana Khorkina, Russian Federation
  - Men's team champions: France
  - Men's all-around champion: Alexei Bondarenko, Russian Federation
  - Men's vault champion: Ioannis Melissanidis, Greece
  - Men's floor exercise champion: Alexei Nemov, Russian Federation
  - Men's still rings champion: Szilveszter Csollány, Hungary
  - Men's parallel bars champion: Alexei Bondarenko, Russian Federation
  - Men's horizontal bar champion: Jesús Carballo, Spain
  - Men's pommel horse champion: Éric Poujade, France

== Association football ==
- FIFA World Cup - France beat Brazil 3–0 to win the World Cup for the first time
- Champions League – Real Madrid C.F. beat Juventus FC 1–0
- UEFA Cup – F.C. Internazionale Milano beat S.S. Lazio 3–0
- Copa Libertadores – CR Vasco da Gama beat Barcelona Sporting Club 4–1 (Agg.)
- Ecuador - Ecuadorian Serie A Champions: Liga Deportiva Universitaria de Quito

== Athletics ==
- August – 1998 European Championships in Athletics held at Budapest
- September – 1998 Commonwealth Games held at Kuala Lumpur
- December – 1998 Asian Games held at Bangkok

== Australian rules football ==
- Australian Football League
  - The Adelaide Crows win the 102nd AFL premiership and second premiership in a row by 35 points (Adelaide Crows 15.15 (105) d North Melbourne 8.22 (70))
  - Brownlow Medal awarded to Robert Harvey (St Kilda)

== Baseball ==
- The National League expands adding the Arizona Diamondbacks, and the American League expands adding the Tampa Bay Devil Rays.
- The Milwaukee Brewers move from the American League to the National League.
- Mark McGwire and Sammy Sosa each chase the home run record set previously by Roger Maris in 1961. Both men end up breaking the record; McGwire with 70 and Sosa with 66.
- Rookie 20-year-old Kerry Wood strikes out 20 Houston Astros to tie the major league single game strikeout record
- Cal Ripken Jr. ends his consecutive game streak at 2,632 in Baltimore against the New York Yankees. It was the first time he wasn't in the lineup since 1982.
- World Series – New York Yankees win 4 games to 0 over the San Diego Padres. The Series MVP is Scott Brosius, New York

== Basketball ==
- July 1 – The NBA locked out its players and the season was put on hold for the next 6½ months and the season began under a 50–game schedule.
- NCAA Men's Basketball Championship –
  - Kentucky wins 78–69 over Utah
- NBA Finals –
  - Chicago Bulls win 4 games to 2 over the Utah Jazz, to complete their second three–peat of the decade.
- WNBA Finals –
  - Houston Comets win two games to one over the Phoenix Mercury to repeat as champions.
- FIBA World Championship
  - Yugoslavia World Champion
- National Basketball League (Australia) Finals:
  - Adelaide 36ers defeated the South East Melbourne Magic 2–0 in the best–of–three final series.

== Boxing ==
- May 17 to May 24 – 32nd European Amateur Boxing Championships held at Minsk, Belarus
- June 27 – Shane Mosley stopped Wilfrido Ruiz in the 5th round to retain the IBF Lightweight Championship

== Canadian football ==
- Grey Cup – Calgary Stampeders win 26–24 over the Hamilton Tiger-Cats
- Vanier Cup – Saskatchewan Huskies win 24–17 over the Concordia Stingers

== Curling ==
- Curling makes its Winter Olympics debut:
  - Men's Gold: Switzerland wins 9–3 over Canada
  - Women's Gold: Canada wins 7–5 over Denmark

== Cycling ==
- Giro d'Italia won by Marco Pantani of Italy
- Tour de France – Marco Pantani of Italy
- UCI Road World Championships – Men's road race – Oskar Camenzind of Switzerland

== Dogsled racing ==
- Iditarod Trail Sled Dog Race Champion
  - Jeff King wins with lead dogs: Red & Rocket

== Field hockey ==
- Men's World Cup: Netherlands
- Men's Commonwealth Games: Australia
- Men's Champions Trophy: Netherlands
- Women's World Cup: Australia
- Women's Commonwealth Games: Australia

== Figure skating ==
- World Figure Skating Championships –
  - Men's champion: Alexei Yagudin, Russia
  - Ladies' champion: Michelle Kwan, United States
  - Pairs' champions: Elena Berezhnaya / Anton Sikharulidze, Russia
  - Ice dancing champions: Anjelika Krylova / Oleg Ovsyannikov, Russia

== Floorball ==
- Men's World Floorball Championships
  - Champion: Sweden
- European Cup
  - Men's champion: Warberg IC
  - Women's champion: Högdalens AIS

== Gaelic Athletic Association ==
- Camogie
  - All–Ireland Camogie Champion: Cork
  - National Camogie League: Cork
- Gaelic football
  - All-Ireland Senior Football Championship – Galway 1–14 died Kiladre 1–10
  - National Football League – Offaly 0–9 died Derry 0–7
- Ladies' Gaelic football
  - All–Ireland Senior Football Champion: Waterford
  - National Football League: Waterford
- Hurling
  - All-Ireland Senior Hurling Championship – Offaly 2–16 died Kilkenny 1–13
  - National Hurling League – Cork 2–14 beat Waterford 0–13

== Golf ==
Men's professional

- Masters Tournament – Mark O'Meara
- U.S. Open – Lee Janzen
- British Open – Mark O'Meara
- PGA Championship – Vijay Singh
- PGA Tour money leader – David Duval – $2,591,031
- PGA Tour Player of the Year – Mark O'Meara
- PGA Tour Rookie of the Year – Steve Flesch
- Senior PGA Tour money leader – Hale Irwin – $2,861,945

Men's amateur

- British Amateur – Sergio García
- U.S. Amateur – Hank Kuehne
- European Amateur – Paddy Gribben

Women's professional

- Nabisco Dinah Shore – Pat Hurst
- LPGA Championship – Se Ri Pak
- U.S. Women's Open – Se Ri Pak
- Classique du Maurier – Brandie Burton
- LPGA Tour money leader – Annika Sörenstam – $1,092,748
- The Solheim Cup is retained by the United States team who beat the European team 16 to 12.

== Handball ==
- Men's European Championship: Sweden
- Women's European Championship: Norway

== Harness racing ==
- North America Cup – Straight Path
- United States Pacing Triple Crown races –
  1. Cane Pace – Shady Character
  2. Little Brown Jug – Shady Character
  3. Messenger Stakes – Fit For Life
- United States Trotting Triple Crown races –
  1. Hambletonian – Muscles Yankee
  2. Yonkers Trot – Muscles Yankee
  3. Kentucky Futurity – Trade Balance
- Australian Inter Dominion Harness Racing Championship –
  - Pacers: Our Sir Vancelot
  - Trotters: Buster Hanover

== Horse racing ==
Steeplechases

- Cheltenham Gold Cup – Cool Dawn
- Grand National – Earth Summit

Flat races

- Australia – Melbourne Cup – Jezabeel
- Canada – Queen's Plate – Archers Bay
- Dubai – Dubai World Cup won by Silver Charm
- France – Prix de l'Arc de Triomphe – Sagamix
- Ireland – Irish Derby Stakes – Dream Well
- Japan – Japan Cup won by El Condor Pasa
- English Triple Crown races:
  1. 2,000 Guineas Stakes – King of Kings
  2. The Derby – High-Rise
  3. St. Leger Stakes – Nedawi
- United States Triple Crown races:
  1. Kentucky Derby – Real Quiet
  2. Preakness Stakes – Real Quiet
  3. Belmont Stakes – Victory Gallop
- Breeders' Cup World Thoroughbred Championships:
  1. Breeders' Cup Classic – Awesome Again
  2. Breeders' Cup Distaff – Escena
  3. Breeders' Cup Juvenile – Answer Lively
  4. Breeders' Cup Juvenile Fillies – Silverbulletday
  5. Breeders' Cup Mile – Da Hoss
  6. Breeders' Cup Sprint – Reraise
  7. Breeders' Cup Turf – Buck's Boy

== Ice hockey ==
- For the first time, professional players from the National Hockey League participate in the Winter Olympics. And also for the first time in Olympic history, women took part in ice hockey.
- Women's Gold – United States won 3–1 over Canada
- Men's Gold – Czech Republic won 1–0 over Russia
- Art Ross Trophy as the NHL's leading scorer during the regular season: Jaromír Jágr, Pittsburgh Penguins
- Hart Memorial Trophy – for the NHL's Most Valuable Player: Dominik Hašek – Buffalo Sabres
- Stanley Cup – Detroit Red Wings defeated the Washington Capitals 4 games to 0.
- World Hockey Championship
  - Men's champion: Sweden defeated Finland
  - Junior Men's champion: Russia defeated Canada

== Lacrosse ==
- The 8th World Lacrosse Championship is held in Baltimore, Maryland. The United States win, and Canada is the runner–up.
- The Philadelphia Wings sweep the Baltimore Thunder in the best of three series held to determine the winner of the Champion's Cup.
- The Brampton Excelsiors win the Mann Cup.
- The Clarington Green Gaels win the Founders Cup.
- The Burnaby Lakers win the Minto Cup.

== Mixed martial arts ==
The following is a list of major noteworthy MMA events during 1998 in chronological order.

Date	Event	Alternate Name/s	Location	Attendance	PPV Buyrate	Notes
March 13	UFC 16: Battle in the Bayou	—N/a	(United States) New Orleans, Louisiana, US	4,600	—N/a	This event featured the first ever UFC lightweight tournament. As well as a middleweight championship bout. And a heavyweight and middleweight superfights.
March 15	Pride 2	—N/a	Yokohama, Japan	—N/a	—N/a	Event featured six MMA bouts and two kickboxing bouts.
May 15	UFC 17: Redemption	—N/a	(United States) Mobile, Alabama, US	—N/a	—N/a	This event was the last UFC event aside from UFC 23, to feature the "tournament" style format. This event featured a four-man middleweight tournament. As well as three heavyweight superfights.
June 24	Pride 3	—N/a	Tokyo, Japan	—N/a	—N/a	—N/a
October 11	Pride 4	—N/a	Tokyo, Japan	—N/a	—N/a	—N/a
October 16	UFC Brazil: Ultimate Brazil	UFC 17.5	São Paulo, Brazil	—N/a	—N/a	This event caused controversy due to the fact that the Brazilian flag was wrongly represented on the promotional material.

== Rugby league ==
- 1998 NRL season
  - 1998 NRL grand final
- Super League III
  - 1998 Super League Grand Final
- 1998 State of Origin series
- 1998 New Zealand season
  - 1998 New Zealand tour of Great Britain

== Rugby union ==
- 104th Five Nations Championship series is won by France who complete the Grand Slam
- Tri Nations series is won by South Africa for the first time, with a clean sweep of victories. South Africa goes on to equal New Zealand's all-time record of 17 consecutive test victories.

== Snooker ==
- World Snooker Championship – John Higgins beats Ken Doherty 18–12 to win his first world title
- World rankings – John Higgins becomes world number one for 1998/99

== Swimming ==
- Eighth FINA World Championships, held in Perth, Australia (January 8 – 17)
- Second European SC Championships, held in Sheffield, United Kingdom (December 11 – December 13)
- December 1 – American swimmer Jenny Thompson breaks her own world record in the women's 100m butterfly (short course): 56:90
- December 13 – Mark Foster twice breaks the world record in the men's 50m freestyle (short course) during the European SC Championships in Sheffield, clocking 21.31 eventually.

== Tennis ==
Grand Slam in tennis men's results:

- Australian Open – Petr Korda
- French Open – Carlos Moyá
- Wimbledon championships – Pete Sampras
- U.S. Open – Patrick Rafter

Grand Slam in tennis women's results:

- Australian Open – Martina Hingis
- French Open – Arantxa Sánchez Vicario
- Wimbledon championships – Jana Novotná
- U.S. Open – Lindsay Davenport
- Davis Cup – Sweden wins 4–1 over Italy in world tennis.

== Volleyball ==
- Men's World Championship: Italy
- Women's World Championship: Cuba

== Water polo ==
- Men's World Championship: Spain
- Women's World Championship: Italy

== Weightlifting ==
- The 1998 World Weightlifting Championships were held in Lahti, Finland from November 7 to November 15.

== Multi-sport events ==
- 1998 Winter Olympics held in Nagano, Japan
  - Germany wins the most medals (29), and the most gold medals (12)
- Asian Games held in Bangkok, Thailand
- 1998 Commonwealth Games held in Kuala Lumpur, Malaysia
- Central American and Caribbean Games held in Maracaibo, Venezuela
- Summer Goodwill Games held in New York City, United States

== Awards ==
- Associated Press Male Athlete of the Year – Mark McGwire, Major League Baseball
- Associated Press Female Athlete of the Year – Se Ri Pak, LPGA golf
