= Saratoga Springs (horse) =

Canadian-bred Thoroughbred racehorse

- Sire: El Gran Senor
- Grandsire: Northern Dancer
- Dam: Population
- Damsire: General Assembly
- Sex: Stallion
- Foaled: 21 January 1995
- Country: Canada
- Colour: Chestnut
- Breeder: Huntington Stud Farm, Inc
- Owner: Michael Tabor & Sue Magnier; Godolphin
- Trainer: Aidan O'Brien; Saeed bin Suroor; Bob Baffert
- Record: 16: 5-1-3
- Earnings: £254,661

Major wins
- Acomb Stakes (1997); Beresford Stakes (1997); Racing Post Trophy (1997); Dante Stakes (1998)

Saratoga Springs (21 January 1995 – after 2004) was a Canadian-bred Thoroughbred racehorse and sire. He was sent to race in Europe and was one of the best two-year-olds of his generation in 1997 when he won four of his seven races including the Acomb Stakes, the Beresford Stakes and the Racing Post Trophy. In the following year he won the Dante Stakes but was beaten when favourite for the Prix du Jockey Club and ran unplaced in The Derby and the Irish Derby. He later raced in the United Arab Emirates and the United States but never won again. He later stood as a breeding stallion in Ireland and Australia with little success.

== Background ==
Saratoga Springs was a chestnut horse with a narrow white blaze bred in Ontario by Huntington Stud Farm. He was from the tenth crop of foals sired by El Gran Senor, an outstanding performer in Europe where his wins included the Dewhurst Stakes, 2000 Guineas and Irish Derby. El Gran Senor was not a prolific stallion but sired several other major winners including Rodrigo de Triano, Al Hareb, Belmez and Lit de Justice. Saratoga Springs' dam Population was an unraced, British-bred daughter of General Assembly and Prudent Girl who was a half-sister to Hethersett.

In July 1996, the yearling colt was offered for sale at Keeneland and was bought for $825,000 by the bloodstock agent Dermot "Demi" O'Byrne acting on behalf of John Magnier's Coolmore Stud organisation. Saratoga Springs was sent to Europe and entered training with Aidan O'Brien at Ballydoyle. Like many Coolmore horses, the details of the colt's ownership changed from race to race. He was usually described as being owned by Michael Tabor whilst on other occasions he ran for the partnership of Tabor and Susan Magnier.

== Racing career ==
=== 1997: two-year-old season ===
On his racecourse debut, Saratoga Springs started the 4/6 favourite for a six furlong maiden race at the Curragh Racecourse on 29 June. Ridden by Christy Roche he looked outpaced at half way but finished strongly and just failed to win, beaten a short head in a three-way photo finish by Two-Twenty-Two and Natalis who dead-heated for first. Two weeks later, the colt started 4/7 favourite for a similar event over seven furlongs at Gowran Park and recorded his first success, going clear of his opponents in the final furlong before being eased down by Roche to win by three quarters of a length from the John Oxx-trained filly Absoluta. On 26 July at the Curragh Saratoga Springs started odds-on favourite for a minor stakes race over seven furlongs in which he was ridden by Seamie Heffernan. After leading from the start he was tackled by the filly Tarascon in the last quarter mile and came out second best after a prolonged struggle, going down by half a length to his rival. The colt was then sent to England to contest the Acomb Stakes at York Racecourse on 19 August when he was equipped with a visor for the first time. Ridden by Mick Kinane he was among the leaders from the start, took the lead two furlongs out and drew away in the closing stages to win by five lengths from Chester House and the Godolphin runner Mutawwaj who dead-heated for second. The other beaten horses included Teapot Row and La-Faah who went on to win the Royal Lodge Stakes and the Horris Hill Stakes respectively.

Saratoga Springs made his second visit to Britain when he was one of five colts to contest the Group Two Champagne Stakes at Doncaster Racecourse on 12 September. He started the 5/2 second choice in the betting behind the Henry Cecil-trained Daggers Drawn, the winner of the Richmond Stakes. Ridden again by Kinane, he tracked the leaders but looked somewhat outpaced in the closing stages and was beaten into third place behind Daggers Drawn and Docksider. On 18 October Saratoga Springs was matched against six opponents in the Group Three Beresford Stakes over one mile at the Curragh and started 7/4 favourite ahead of the Jim Bolger-trained Sabre Mountain. He raced in second before Roche sent him into the lead in last quarter mile and he stayed on well to win by four lengths from Hanzanar. On his final appearance of the year, Saratoga Springs was ridden by Kinane when he ran in the Racing Post Trophy at Doncaster on 25 October. The 7/2 favourite was the Michael Stoute-trained Kilimnjaro with Saratoga Springs next in the betting on 9/2 alongside the previously undefeated Mudeer whilst the other five runners included Little Indian (winner of the Solario Stakes) and Mountain Song (third in the National Stakes). Saratoga Springs tracked the leaders Mountain Song set the pace before giving way to Craigsteel three furlongs out. The Canadian colt overtook Craigsteel approaching the final furlong and held off the strong late challenge of Mudeer to win by a short head with Mutamam a length away in third place. Mutamam's jockey Richard Hills lodged an objection against the first two finishers, but the result remained unaltered. After the race O'Brien said "All Saratoga does is eat and sleep. He's so laid back".

=== 1998: three-year-old season ===
Saratoga Springs made his three-year-old debut in the Dante Stakes (a major trial race for The Derby) over ten and a half furlongs at York on 13 May. He was ridden by Kinane and started the 4/1 third favourite behind Border Arrow, who had finished third to the O'Brien-trained King of Kings in the 2000 Guineas and the previously undefeated Dr Fong, whilst the other three runners were City Honours, Teapot Row and Greenlander. He was restrained at the rear of the field at Teapot Row set the pace before making a forward move early in the straight. He took the lead inside the final furlong and got the better of City Honours and Border Arrow to win by half a length and three quarters of a length. Eighteen days after his win at York, Saratoga Springs was sent to France and started the 2.7/1 favourite for the Prix du Jockey Club over 2400 metres at Chantilly Racecourse. After being held up by Kinane he made steady progress in the straight without ever looking likely to win and finished fourth behind Dream Well, Croco Rouge and Sestino. In the Derby a week later he was the least fancied of the three O'Brien runners and started a 20/1 outsider in a fifteen-runner field. Ridden by Willie Ryan he reached seventh place early in the straight but tired in the closing stages and finished tenth behind High-Rise who won by a short head and two and a half lengths from City Honours and Border Arrow. Walter Swinburn took the ride when the colt started 8/1 third favourite for the Irish Derby at the Curragh on 28 June. After racing in fifth place he could make no progress in the straight and finished sixth behind Dream Well.

=== 1999: four-year-old season ===
In the autumn of 1998 Saratoga Springs was acquired for an undisclosed by Sheikh Mohammed's Godolphin stable and was sent to Dubai where he was trained by Saeed bin Suroor, with the Dubai World Cup as his target. On his first start for his new trainer he was ridden by Jerry Bailey when he contested the Dubai Turf Classic at Nad Al Sheba Racecourse on 28 March. He made no impression as he finished tailed off last of the eleven runners behind Fruits of Love. The colt was then transferred to the United States where Bob Baffert took over as his trainer. He finished third in an allowance race at Ellis Park Race Course in September but finished unplaced in his three subsequent starts, ending his racing career by finishing sixth in an allowance at Hollywood Park Racetrack on 5 December.

== Stud record ==
At the end of his racing career Saratoga Springs was retired to become a breeding stallion. He was based at the Haras Du Mezeray in France and was also shuttled to stand in Australia but had little success in either location. His last foals were born in 2005.

== Pedigree ==
Pedigree of Saratoga Springs, chestnut stallion, 1995
Sire El Gran Senor (USA) 1981	Northern Dancer (CAN); 1961	Nearctic	Nearco
Sire El Gran Senor (USA) 1981	Northern Dancer (CAN); 1961	Nearctic	Lady Angela
Sire El Gran Senor (USA) 1981	Northern Dancer (CAN); 1961	Natalma	Native Dancer
Sire El Gran Senor (USA) 1981	Northern Dancer (CAN); 1961	Natalma	Almahmoud
Sire El Gran Senor (USA) 1981	Sex Appeal (USA); 1970	Buckpasser	Tom Fool
Sire El Gran Senor (USA) 1981	Sex Appeal (USA); 1970	Buckpasser	Busanda
Sire El Gran Senor (USA) 1981	Sex Appeal (USA); 1970	Best In Show	Traffic Judge
Sire El Gran Senor (USA) 1981	Sex Appeal (USA); 1970	Best In Show	Stolen Hour
Dam Population (IRE) 1986	General Assembly (USA); 1976	Secretariat	Bold Ruler
Dam Population (IRE) 1986	General Assembly (USA); 1976	Secretariat	Somethingroyal
Dam Population (IRE) 1986	General Assembly (USA); 1976	Exclusive Dancer	Native Dancer
Dam Population (IRE) 1986	General Assembly (USA); 1976	Exclusive Dancer	Exclusive
Dam Population (IRE) 1986	Prudent Girl (GB); 1968	Primera	My Babu
Dam Population (IRE) 1986	Prudent Girl (GB); 1968	Primera	Pirette
Dam Population (IRE) 1986	Prudent Girl (GB); 1968	Bride Elect	Big Game
Dam Population (IRE) 1986	Prudent Girl (GB); 1968	Bride Elect	Netherton Maid (Family:21-a)
