= 1998 Preakness Stakes =

123rd running of the Preakness Stakes

123rd Preakness Stakes
- The Preakness Stakes
- "The Middle Jewel of the Triple Crown" "The Run for the Black-Eyed Susans"
- Location: Pimlico Race Course, Baltimore, Maryland, United States
- Date: May 16, 1998
- Winning horse: Real Quiet
- Jockey: Kent Desormeaux
- Trainer: Bob Baffert
- Conditions: Fast
- Surface: Dirt

The 1998 Preakness Stakes was the 123rd running of the Preakness Stakes thoroughbred horse race. The race took place on May 16, 1998, and was televised in the United States on the ABC television network. Real Quiet, who was jockeyed by Kent Desormeaux, won the race by two and one quarter lengths over runner-up Victory Gallop. Approximate post time was 5:29 p.m. Eastern Time. The race was run over a fast track in a final time of 1:54-3/5. The Maryland Jockey Club reported total attendance of 103,269, this is recorded as second highest on the list of American thoroughbred racing top attended events for North America in 1998.

== Payout ==
The 123rd Preakness Stakes Payout Schedule

| Program Number | Horse Name | Win | Place | Show |
|---|---|---|---|---|
| 11 | Real Quiet | US$7.00 | $3.60 | $3.00 |
| 10 | Victory Gallop | - | $3.20 | $2.80 |
| 3 | Classic Cat | - | - | $4.80 |

- $2 Exacta: (11–10) paid $14.80
- $2 Trifecta: (11–10–3) paid $97.40
- $1 Superfecta: (11–10–3–8) paid $270.80

== The full chart ==
| Finish position | Margin (lengths) | Post position | Horse name | Jockey | Trainer | Owner | Post time odds | Purse earnings |
|---|---|---|---|---|---|---|---|---|
| 1st | 0 | 11 | Real Quiet | Kent Desormeaux | Bob Baffert | Michael E. Pegram | 2.50-1 | $650,000 |
| 2nd | 2-1/4 | 10 | Victory Gallop | Gary Stevens | W. Elliott Walden | Prestonwood Farm | 2.00-1 favorite | $200,000 |
| 3rd | 3 | 3 | Classic Cat | Robby Albarado | David C. Cross Jr. | Gary M. Garber | 12.30-1 | $100,000 |
| 4th | 6 3/4 | 7 | Hot Wells | Edgar Prado | Thomas M. Amoss | So What's Nu Stable | 25.20-1 | $50,000 |
| 5th | 7 | 2 | Black Cash | Shane Sellers | Richard E. Dutrow | Stronach Stables | 7.10-1 | |
| 6th | 7-1/4 | 1 | Spartan Cat | Rick Wilson | D. Wayne Lukas | Marathon Farm | 98.80-1 | |
| 7th | 17 | 6 | Baquero | Pat Day | D. Wayne Lukas | Robert B. Lewis | 14.60-1 | |
| 8th | 24-1/4 | 5 | Basic Trainee | Cornelio Velásquez | Jorge E. Romero | Luis Gambotto | 63.80-1 | |
| 9th | 24 1/2 | 4 | Cape Town | Jerry Bailey | D. Wayne Lukas | Overbrook Farm | 2.90-1 | |
| 10th | 29 1/2 | 8 | Silver's Prospect | Frank G. Douglas | Jean L. Rofe | Robert G. Sowder | 98.00-1 | |
| 11th | scr | scr | Coronado's Quest | Mike E. Smith | Claude R. McGaughey III | Stuart S. Janney III | scr | |

- Winning Breeder: Little Hill Farm; (KY)
- Final Time: 1:54 3/5
- Track Condition: Fast
- Total Attendance: 103,269

== See also ==
- 1998 Kentucky Derby
