= 1998 Belmont Stakes =

American horse race

130th Belmont Stakes
- Belmont Stakes
- Location: Belmont Park; Elmont, New York, U.S.
- Date: June 6, 1998
- Distance: 1 1/2 mi (12 furlongs; 2,414 m)
- Winning horse: Victory Gallop
- Winning time: 2:29.16
- Final odds: 4.50 (to 1)
- Jockey: Gary Stevens
- Trainer: W. Elliott Walden
- Owner: Prestonwood Farm
- Conditions: Fast
- Surface: Dirt

The 1998 Belmont Stakes was the 130th running of the Belmont Stakes and the 94th time that the event took place at Belmont Park in Elmont, New York.

Victory Gallop, ridden by jockey Gary Stevens and trained by W. Elliott Walden won the race by a nose over favorite Real Quiet. Victory Gallop's win prevented Real Quiet from winning the Triple Crown that year.

== Full results ==
Finish	PP	Horse	Jockey	Trainer	Owner	Final Odds	Winnings
1	9	Victory Gallop	Gary Stevens	W. Elliott Walden	Prestonwood Farm	4.50	$600,000
2	7	Real Quiet	Kent Desormeaux	Bob Baffert	Michael E. Pegram	0.80	$200,000
3	1	Thomas Jo	Chris_McCarron	Jimmy Jerkens	Earle I. Mack	28.50	$110,000
4	4	Parade Ground	Pat Day	Neil J. Howard	Lane's End Farm	20.40	$60,000
5	8	Raffie's Majesty	Jorge F. Chavez	H. James Bond	Henry H. Prieger	13.90	$30,000
6	3	Chilito	Robbie Davis	H. Graham Motion	Lazy Lane Farms LLC	85.75	
7	11	Grand Slam	Jerry Bailey	D. Wayne Lukas	Robert C. Baker	7.20	
8	5	Classic Cat	John R. Velazquez	David C. Cross Jr.	Gary M. Garber	10.40	
9	6	Limit Out	Jean-Luc Samyn	H. Allen Jerkens	Joseph V. Shields Jr.	20.90	
10	10	Yarrow Brae	Mike E. Smith	D. Wayne Lukas	Michael Tabor	32.25	
11	2	Basic Trainee	Joe Bravo	Jorge E. Romero	Luis A. Gambotto & Enrique Ocejo	113.25	

- Winning Breeder: Tall Oaks Farm (Ivan Dalos) (ON)
