= 1998 Epsom Derby =

- Location: Epsom Downs Racecourse
- Date: 6 June 1998
- Winning horse: High-Rise
- Starting price: 20/1
- Jockey: Olivier Peslier
- Trainer: Luca Cumani
- Owner: Mohammed Obaid al Maktoum

Epsom Derby 1998
1-2-3
High-Rise	City Honours	Border Arrow

Also Ran
4-5-6
Sunshine Street	Greek Dance	The Glow-Worm
7-8-9
Sadian	Second Empire	Cape Verdi
10-11-12
Saratoga Springs	Gulland	Courteous
13-14-15
Mutamam	Haami	King Of Kings

The 1998 Epsom Derby was a horse race which took place at Epsom Downs on Saturday 6 June 1998. It was the 219th running of the Derby, and it was won by High-Rise. The winner was ridden by Olivier Peslier and trained by Luca Cumani. The pre-race favourite Cape Verdi finished ninth.

== Race details ==
- Sponsor: Vodafone
- Winner's prize money: £598,690
- Going: Good
- Number of runners: 15
- Winner's time: 2m 33.88s

== Full result ==
	*	Horse	Jockey	Trainer ^{†}	SP
1		High-Rise	Olivier Peslier	Luca Cumani	20/1
2	hd	City Honours	John Reid	Saeed bin Suroor	12/1
3	2½	Border Arrow	Ray Cochrane	Ian Balding	25/1
4	hd	Sunshine Street	Johnny Murtagh	Noel Meade (IRE)	150/1
5	3	Greek Dance	Walter Swinburn	Michael Stoute	5/1
6	1	The Glow-Worm	Darryll Holland	Barry Hills	20/1
7	2½	Sadian	Kieren Fallon	Henry Cecil	25/1
8	shd	Second Empire	Michael Kinane	Aidan O'Brien (IRE)	9/2
9	2½	Cape Verdi (filly)	Frankie Dettori	Saeed bin Suroor	11/4 fav
10	2	Saratoga Springs	Willie Ryan	Aidan O'Brien (IRE)	20/1
11	7	Gulland	Michael Hills	Geoff Wragg	12/1
12	½	Courteous	Richard Quinn	Paul Cole	14/1
13	2½	Mutamam	Michael Roberts	Alec Stewart	50/1
14	6	Haami	Richard Hills	John Dunlop	20/1
15	7	King of Kings	Pat Eddery	Aidan O'Brien (IRE)	11/2

* The distances between the horses are shown in lengths or shorter. shd = short-head; hd = head.
† Trainers are based in Great Britain unless indicated.

== Winner's details ==
Further details of the winner, High-Rise:

- Foaled: 3 May 1995, in Ireland
- Sire: High Estate; Dam: High Tern (High Line)
- Owner: Mohammed Obaid Al Maktoum
- Breeder: Mohammed Obaid Al Maktoum
- Rating in 1998 International Classifications: 129

== Form analysis ==
=== Two-year-old races ===
Notable runs by the future Derby participants as two-year-olds in 1997.

- City Honours – 4th Washington Singer Stakes, 3rd Royal Lodge Stakes
- Second Empire – 1st Prix des Chênes, 1st Grand Critérium
- Cape Verdi – 2nd Chesham Stakes, 1st Lowther Stakes, 4th Cheveley Park Stakes
- Saratoga Springs – 1st Acomb Stakes, 3rd Champagne Stakes, 1st Beresford Stakes, 1st Racing Post Trophy
- Gulland – 1st Silver Tankard Stakes
- Mutamam – 3rd Racing Post Trophy
- Haami – 3rd Solario Stakes, 1st Somerville Tattersall Stakes
- King of Kings – 1st Railway Stakes, 2nd Anglesey Stakes, 1st Tyros Stakes, 1st National Stakes

=== The road to Epsom ===
Early-season appearances in 1998 and trial races prior to running in the Derby.

- High-Rise – 1st Lingfield Derby Trial
- City Honours – 2nd Dante Stakes
- Border Arrow – 1st Feilden Stakes, 3rd 2,000 Guineas, 3rd Dante Stakes
- Sunshine Street – 2nd Derrinstown Stud Derby Trial
- Greek Dance – 1st Glasgow Stakes
- The Glow-Worm – 1st Blue Riband Trial Stakes, 2nd Chester Vase
- Sadian – 2nd Lingfield Derby Trial
- Second Empire – 3rd Irish 2,000 Guineas
- Cape Verdi – 1st 1,000 Guineas
- Saratoga Springs – 1st Dante Stakes, 4th Prix du Jockey Club
- Gulland – 2nd Craven Stakes, 1st Chester Vase
- Courteous – 1st Sandown Classic Trial
- Mutamam – 2nd Predominate Stakes
- Haami – 5th 2,000 Guineas
- King of Kings – 1st 2,000 Guineas

=== Subsequent Group 1 wins ===
Group 1 / Grade I victories after running in the Derby.

- Sunshine Street – San Juan Capistrano Handicap (2000)
- Greek Dance – Bayerisches Zuchtrennen (2000)
- Mutamam – Canadian International Stakes (2001)

== Subsequent breeding careers ==
Leading progeny of participants in the 1998 Epsom Derby.

=== Sires of Group/Grade One winners ===
King Of Kings (15th) Stood in Australia, America, Switzerland and South Africa

- Reigning To Win - 1st T.J. Smith Stakes (2006)
- Ike's Dream - 1st Queen of the Turf Stakes (2005)
- King's Chapel - 1st New Zealand 2000 Guineas (2003)
- Arlette - Dam of Alexandros (2nd Lockinge Stakes 2009)

=== Sires of National Hunt horses ===
Second Empire (8th) - Later exported to South Africa

- Auroras Encore - 1st Grand National 2013
- Somersby - 1st Clarence House Chase 2012
- Strangely Brown - 1st Prix Alain du Breil 2005

Sunshine Street (4th)

- Ely Brown - 1st Towton Novices' Chase 2014

=== Other Stallions ===
City Honours (2nd) - Miley Shah - 1st Grade 3 Hurdle 2012
High-Rise (1st) - Sired winners in Japan before standing in Ireland to sire jumps winners
Greek Dance (5th) - Stood in Germany before retiring due to severe fertility problems
Sadian (7th) - Exported to Saudi Arabia
Saratoga Springs (10th) - Minor flat and jumps winners
Gulland (11th) - Minor jumps winners and flat placed horse
Courteous (12th) - Minor flat and jumps winners
Mutamam (13th) - Minor flat winners - Exported to Italy
Haami (14th) - Exported to Cyprus

=== Broodmare ===
Cape Verdi (9th)

- Nabucco - Won ten races - listed wins on flat and over hurdles
- Benandonner - Thirteen wins on flat including at Shergar Cup
- Thoura - Won thrice at three before suffering fatal injury
