= Saratoga Springs (disambiguation) =

Saratoga Springs is a city in Saratoga, upstate New York.

Saratoga Springs may also refer to:

- Saratoga Springs, California
- Saratoga Springs, Utah
- Saratoga Springs, Nebraska, a former town and now a neighborhood of Omaha
- Disney's Saratoga Springs Resort & Spa, a resort hotel at Walt Disney World in Florida
- Saratoga Springs (Death Valley), an oasis in California
- Saratoga Springs (horse), a thoroughbred racehorse
