= Favorite Trick =

American-bred Thoroughbred racehorse

- Sire: Phone Trick
- Grandsire: Clever Trick
- Dam: Evil Elaine
- Damsire: Medieval Man
- Sex: Stallion
- Foaled: 1995
- Country: United States
- Color: Dark Bay
- Breeder: Max and Sylvia Wood
- Owner: Joseph LaCombe
- Trainer: Patrick B. Byrne; William I. Mott (at age 3)
- Record: 16: 12-0-1
- Earnings: $1,726,793

Major wins
- Hopeful Stakes (1997); Kentucky Breeders' Cup Stakes (1997); Bashford Manor Stakes (1997); Saratoga Special Stakes (1997); Breeders' Futurity Stakes (1997); Swale Stakes (1998); Long Branch Breeders' Cup Stakes (1998); Jim Dandy Stakes (1998); Keeneland Breeders' Cup Mile Stakes (1998) Breeders' Cup wins: Breeders' Cup Juvenile (1997)

Awards
- U.S. Champion 2-Yr-Old Colt (1997); United States Horse of the Year (1997)
- Last updated on March 30, 2021

Favorite Trick (April 20, 1995 – June 6, 2006) was an American Thoroughbred racehorse who in 1997 became the first 2-year-old in twenty-five years to be voted United States Horse of the Year.

Bred at Wintergreen Farm in Midway, Kentucky by Max Wood and his wife, Sylvia, Favorite Trick was out of the mare Evil Elaine. His sire was the successful sprint horse Phone Trick, who retired with a record of nine wins and a second in ten career starts. A descendant of the great Nearco through both his sire and dam, Favorite Trick was selected by trainer Patrick B. Byrne at an auction in February 1997 as a purchase for Joseph LaCombe. Lacombe had previously owned several horses in partnership with others.

== Undefeated Horse of the Year ==
Trained by Byrne and ridden by Pat Day in all his races, at age two Favorite Trick went undefeated in eight starts. He scored victories in major races such as the Hopeful Stakes and Breeders Futurity. He then capped off his year with a win in the Breeders' Cup Juvenile after avoiding a near-collision on the first turn. He ran away from the field to win by five increasing lengths while setting a Breeders' Cup Juvenile record of 1:41.47.

Favorite Trick's performances in 1997 earned him the Eclipse Award for Outstanding 2-Year-Old Male Horse, and he became the first two-year-old since Secretariat in 1972 to be voted the Eclipse Award for Horse of the Year. Going into the 1998 racing season, many people made comparisons between the horses. Like Secretariat, Favorite Trick was the winterbook favorite for May's Kentucky Derby. However, some turf writers and other racing people noted that Favorite Trick had not clocked any remarkably fast times and that six of his wins had been at distances between 5 and 7 furlongs (3,300 and 4,600 ft; 1,000 and 1,400 m), with both the Breeders Futurity and the Breeders' Cup Juvenile at 8.5 furlongs (5,600 ft; 1,700 m). Since he was a son of a sprint sire, some believed that it remained to be seen if Favorite Trick could compete at the longer distances of the American Classic Races.

== Three-year-old racing season ==
For 1998, Favorite Trick's conditioning was taken over by Bill Mott after Patrick Byrne accepted an offer to take over the stable of prominent Canadian horseman Frank Stronach. Under Mott, Favorite Trick opened his 3-year-old season with a win in the 7-furlong (4,600 ft; 1,400 m) Swale Stakes at Florida's Gulfstream Park but in the Arkansas Derby, his first attempt at 9 furlongs (5,900 ft; 1,800 m), he tired near the end and suffered his first defeat, winding up third behind winner Victory Gallop.

By the time parimutuel betting closed for the May 2, 1998, Kentucky Derby, Favorite Trick was the second choice behind the John R. Gaines colt Indian Charlie and slightly favored over the third choice, Overbrook Farm's Florida Derby winner, Cape Town. Starting from post position seven in the Derby, Favorite Trick moved up to fourth by the half-mile (4 furlong) pole but fell back to wind up eighth in the fifteen-horse field behind the winning 8:1 outsider Real Quiet.

Not raced in the Preakness or Belmont Stakes, Favorite Trick did not go back to the track until July 19, when he won the 8.5-furlong (5,600 ft; 1,700 m) Long Branch Breeders' Cup Stakes at Monmouth Park. He followed that victory with an August 9 win in the 9-furlong (5,900 ft; 1,800 m) Jim Dandy Stakes at Saratoga Race Course, then after a fifth place on the same track in the Grade II King's Bishop Stakes, he was sent to Keeneland Race Course, where in October he won the important Keeneland Breeders' Cup Mile Stakes. Favorite Trick's victory led to him being made the betting favorite in November's Breeders' Cup Mile at Churchill Downs, where he finished eighth in a field of fourteen to winner Da Hoss.

== Career as a sire ==
Following his Breeders' Cup loss, Favorite Trick was retired to stud duty at Walmac International near Lexington, Kentucky. He later stood at Cloverleaf Farms II in Ocala, Florida and finally at JEH Stallion Station near Hondo, New Mexico, where he and five other horses died in a barn fire on June 6, 2006. A modestly successful sire of both Thoroughbreds and American Quarter Horses, Favorite Trick sired 16 stakes winners.

Pedigree of Favorite Trick
| Sire Phone Trick | Clever Trick | Icecapade | Nearctic |
| Sire Phone Trick | Clever Trick | Icecapade | Shenanigans |
| Sire Phone Trick | Clever Trick | Kankakee Miss | Better Bee |
| Sire Phone Trick | Clever Trick | Kankakee Miss | Golden Beach |
| Sire Phone Trick | Over The Phone | Finnegan | Royal Charger |
| Sire Phone Trick | Over The Phone | Finnegan | Last Wave |
| Sire Phone Trick | Over The Phone | Prattle | Mr. Busher |
| Sire Phone Trick | Over The Phone | Prattle | Tsumani |
| Dam Evil Elaine | Medieval Man | Noholme | Star Kingdom |
| Dam Evil Elaine | Medieval Man | Noholme | Oceana |
| Dam Evil Elaine | Medieval Man | Peaceful Sky | Tim Tam |
| Dam Evil Elaine | Medieval Man | Peaceful Sky | Curly Sky |
| Dam Evil Elaine | Distinctive Elaine | Distinctive | Never Bend |
| Dam Evil Elaine | Distinctive Elaine | Distinctive | Precious Lady |
| Dam Evil Elaine | Distinctive Elaine | Jackie Dare | Prince Dare |
| Dam Evil Elaine | Distinctive Elaine | Jackie Dare | Jacoenda |
