= Mohammed bin Obaid Al Maktoum =

Sheikh Mohammed bin Obaid Al Maktoum (died 29 December 2025) was a member of the ruling family of Dubai and a major figure in thoroughbred racing. He was the breeder of Dubawi, through his mare Zomaradah, and the owner of multiple Group 1 winners, including the 1998 Epsom Derby winner High-Rise and Without A Fight, the winner of the 2023 Melbourne Cup.

He died unexpectedly on December 29, 2025 in Dubai.
