= Kent Desormeaux =

American jockey (born 1970)

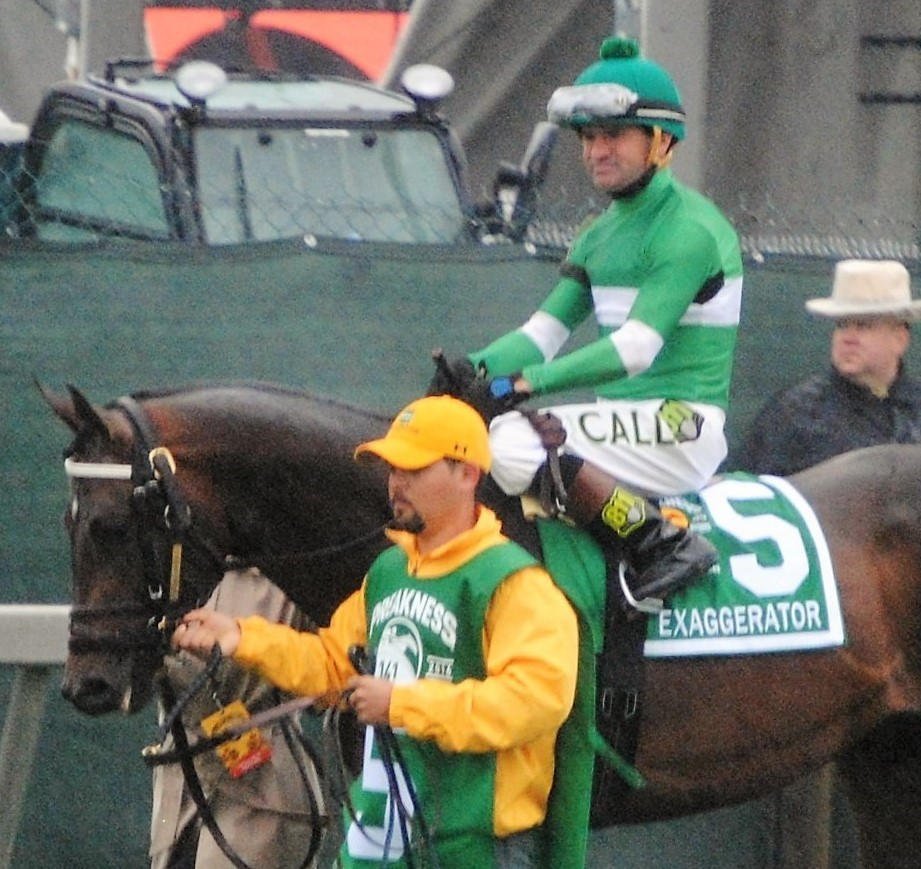
- Kent Desormeaux on Exaggerator prior to the 2016 Preakness

Personal information
- Born: February 27, 1970 (age 56) Maurice, Louisiana, United States
- Occupation: Jockey

Horse racing career
- Sport: Horse racing
- Career wins: 6,172+ (ongoing)

Major racing wins
- American Classics wins: Kentucky Derby (1998, 2000, 2008); Preakness Stakes (1998, 2008, 2016); Belmont Stakes (2009) Breeders' Cup wins: Breeders' Cup Turf (1993); Breeders' Cup Sprint (1995, 2017); Breeders' Cup Dirt Mile (2007); Breeders' Cup Distaff (2010); Breeders' Cup Juvenile (2014) Grade 1 Stakes wins: San Juan Capistrano Handicap (1990, 1993, 1999); Turf Classic Stakes (1990); Pacific Classic Stakes (1992); Santa Anita Handicap (1992, 2002, 2023); Santa Anita Oaks (1992, 1994, 1998); Beverly D. Stakes (1992, 2008, 2009); Awesome Again Stakes (1992, 1993, 1995, 2001); Eddie Read Handicap (1993, 2000); Triple Bend Invitational Handicap (1993); Gamely Stakes (1993, 1995, 1996, 1998, 2000, 2002); Los Alamitos Futurity (1994, 1997, 2006); Mother Goose Stakes (1994); Malibu Stakes (1995, 1996, 2001); Del Mar Futurity (1995, 1998); La Troienne Stakes (1995, 2010); Santa Anita Derby (1997, 2016); Woodward Stakes (1997, 2006); Starlet Stakes (1997, 1998, 2004); Del Mar Debutante Stakes (1997, 1998); Carter Handicap (1998); Oak Leaf Stakes (1998); Donn Handicap (1999); Arkansas Derby (1999); Spinster Stakes (1999, 2008, 2009); Wood Memorial Stakes (2000); Stephen Foster Handicap (2000); Del Mar Oaks (2002); Secretariat Stakes (2002, 2009, 2010); Maker's Mark Mile Stakes (2002, 2009); Jenny Wiley Stakes (2002); Frank E. Kilroe Mile Handicap (2002, 2006, 2016); La Brea Stakes (2003); American Oaks (2004, 2009); Arlington Million (2004); Queen Elizabeth II Challenge Cup Stakes (2004); Metropolitan Handicap (2005); Test Stakes (2005); Clark Handicap (2006); Florida Derby (2008); Haskell Invitational Handicap (2008); Travers Stakes (2009); Jockey Club Gold Cup (2009); Madison Stakes (2010); Ashland Stakes (2010); Breeders' Futurity Stakes (2011); Blue Grass Stakes (2012); Matriarch Stakes (2015); International race wins: Yushun Himba (Japanese Oaks) (2001); Queen's Plate (1998, 2003); Woodbine Mile (1998, 2003)

Racing awards
- Outstanding Apprentice Jockey (1987); Eclipse Award for Outstanding Jockey (1989, 1992); United States Champion Jockey by wins (1987, 1988, 1989); United States Champion Jockey by earnings (1992); George Woolf Memorial Jockey Award (1993); JRA Award for Best Jockey (winning average) (2001)

Honours
- United States' Racing Hall of Fame (2004)

Significant horses
- Best Pal, Big Brown, Exaggerator, Free House, Fusaichi Pegasus, Kotashaan, Real Quiet, Summer Bird, Sweetnorthernsaint, Unrivaled Belle
- Updated on June 9, 2016

Kent Jason Desormeaux (born February 27, 1970) is an American thoroughbred horse racing Hall of Fame jockey who holds the U.S. record for most races won in a single year with 598 wins in 1989. He has won the Kentucky Derby and Preakness Stakes three times each, and the Belmont Stakes once. Aboard Real Quiet, he lost the 1998 Triple Crown by a nose.

== Background ==
From a Cajun family, Desormeaux grew up in a rural farming area located a few miles outside Maurice, Louisiana and attended North Vermilion High School. His brother, J. Keith Desormeaux, older by three years, is a race horse trainer. Desormeaux was a member of the local 4-H club, and was first exposed to race-riding at age 12. "The bush tracks were all around us, and our dad decided he might want to delve into horse racing and bought a bush track Acadiana Downs," explained his brother. "We lived in an agricultural area but we weren't farmers. Even before we got into racing, we all had horses to ride growing up."

== 1986–1997: Early success ==
Desormeaux was sixteen years old when he began working as an apprentice jockey at the Evangeline Downs racetrack in Lafayette, Louisiana. On July 13, 1986, he rode Miss Tavern to his first career victory. He won his first career stakes race on December 13 of that year, riding Godbey in the Maryland City Handicap at Laurel Park Racecourse. For 1986, he had 55 wins from 525 starts.

"I think as an apprentice I was probably cheating. It's kind of like the guy that comes in from Panama and has already been riding for three or four years. As all my Cajun brethren have, we have a head start. It's what launched my career. I showed up in Maryland with added skills."

— Kent Desormeaux, 2004

His success led him to move north to compete on the Maryland racing circuit, where his winning record earned him the Eclipse Award for Outstanding Apprentice Jockey in 1987. While racing in Maryland from 1987 to 1989, Desormeaux won more races than any other jockey in North America. He is one of only four jockeys to have won three national titles in a row. In 1987, he had 450 wins from 2,207 starts with earnings of $5.1 million. In 1988, he improved to 474 wins from 1,897 starts and earnings of $6.3 million. He got his first mount in the Kentucky Derby in 1988, finishing 16th.

In 1989 Desormeaux won his third jockey title, and set an American record for most wins in a year with 598; the previous record had been 546. The record still stands. That year, Desormeaux competed in 2,312 races, earning $9.1 million. He also won the Eclipse Award for Outstanding Jockey. He became the third jockey to win the Eclipse Award in both the apprentice and overall categories, Chris McCarron and Steve Cauthen being the others.

In 1990, he moved to the highly competitive southern California circuit. He later explained, "If I wanted to be in the Kentucky Derby or Breeders' Cup, I had to make a change." Desormeaux would soon win his first major stakes race, the San Juan Capistrano Invitational, then a Grade 1 race at Santa Anita with a purse of $500,000. As a result of the move, Desormeaux's number of wins declined to 220 in 1990, a 60% decrease from 1989. His earnings were less affected, totaling $7.1 million in 1990, a 22% decrease from the year before, a result of the higher purses generally available in California. In 1992, Desormeaux became the regular rider of Best Pal, who put together a string of four graded stakes wins, including the Santa Anita Handicap. He would later call Best Pal his favorite horse to ride. "Best Pal may not have been the fastest horse I ever rode...but what that horse was, was push button."

On December 11, 1992, at Hollywood Park, Desormeaux was thrown when the horse he was riding, Judge Hammer, shied during the stretch drive. He was then kicked in the head by a trailing horse, resulting in multiple skull fractures and a permanent hearing deficit. Prior to the fall, Desormeaux had been on pace to break José A. Santos' then-current earnings record of $14.8 million. Desormeaux fell just short with earnings of $14.1 million, but still won the national earnings title. He also received his second Eclipse Award for Outstanding Jockey.

On January 23, Desormeaux picked up the mount on Kotashaan. They proceeded to win five Grade 1 races together, culminating in the 1993 Breeders' Cup Turf. At the end of the year his peers voted him the prestigious George Woolf Memorial Jockey Award. One of Desormeaux's infamous moments came when riding Kotashaan in the Japan Cup of 1993. They were about to overtake the leader in the closing stages when Desormeaux sat up on the horse, having misjudged the finish line. The mistake cost roughly $1 million in prize money.

In 1995, Desormeaux, aged 25, became the youngest rider to amass 3,000 victories. That year, he scored his second Breeders' Cup title when he beat the "boys" in the Breeders' Cup Sprint with the filly Desert Stormer. In 1997, at age 27, he was the youngest jockey to surpass $100 million in career earnings.

During the mid-nineties, Desormeaux gradually gained a reputation of not listening to trainers. "There is no doubt that I was on top of the world", Desormeaux said. "No one needed to tell me how to ride a horse. I became very irresponsible with rides. I was immature in a number of situations. I wasn't professional. I didn't pay attention to trainer's instructions, and I wasn't persevering to the wire." He never stopped competing, but his win percentage dropped from 23% in 1992 (364 wins in 1,594 starts) to 17% in 1996 (182 wins in 1,053 starts).

== 1998–2009: Quest for the Triple Crown ==
Although he had a great deal of success early in his career, it wasn't until 1998 that he made an impact on the Triple Crown trail. That year, Desormeaux rode Real Quiet to victory in the 1998 Kentucky Derby. "My whole life and career flashed through my mind," he said. "To win the Kentucky Derby -- after having been on top of the world and then falling off the face of the Earth—it was like I was wide-awake inside my most fantastic dream."

He followed this with a victory in the Preakness Stakes. However, Desormeaux lost his bid to win the Triple Crown when Victory Gallop beat Real Quiet by a nose in the final stride in the Belmont Stakes. "It hurts that I'll live in infamy. Who wants to be known for the closest ever to almost win the Triple Crown?" Later that year, he went on to ride the Canadian 3-year-old champion colt Archers Bay to victory in the Queen's Plate, becoming the first jockey since Bill Hartack in 1964 to complete the Kentucky Derby/Queen's Plate double in the same year.

In 2000, Desormeaux won his second Kentucky Derby aboard Fusaichi Pegasus. The two combined to take the Wood Memorial Stakes and Jerome Handicap. "Probably the most talented horse I rode (was) Fusaichi Pegasus," he said in 2004. "What an amazing, amazing, animal that horse was." In 2001, Desormeaux decided to ride in Japan for 10 weeks During this stint, he became the first foreign jockey to win a Classic race in Japan when he rode Lady Pastel to victory in the Yushun Himba (Japanese Oaks).

In 2002, Desormeaux had a good year, ranked tenth by total earnings, capped by his second win in the Santa Anita Handicap on Milwaukee Brew. His ranking then dropped to 31st in 2003. In 2004, he won only 104 races, though his earnings were boosted by his first victory in the Arlington Million. He changed his agent, then shuttled between Japan and America in 2005 for several months. By the end of 2005, he'd accumulated 75 North American wins plus 50 wins in Japan. Although he had no grade 1 wins that year, he did guide Zenno Rob Roy to third place in both the Takarazuka Kinen and Japan Cup. On his return, he again changed agents and in 2006 "moved tack" to the east coast.

In 2008, Desormeaux won his third Kentucky Derby aboard Big Brown who won easily by just under five lengths. Two weeks later, Desormeaux rode Big Brown to victory in the Preakness Stakes at Pimlico Race Course, this time winning by just over five lengths while in hand. With a Triple Crown on the line, Big Brown was made the heavy 3-10 favorite in the Belmont Stakes. Unfortunately, Big Brown broke poorly and was rank for the first quarter mile. He finally settled, but had no response when Desormeaux asked him to run. Desormeaux eased Big Brown after the colt tired at the quarter pole. It was an inexplicably poor performance by a colt who went on to win the Haskell Invitational and Monmouth Park Stakes. Desormeaux received a good deal of criticism for his ride, though some praised him for protecting the colt from potential injury.

He scored his 5,000th career victory on July 27, 2008, by guiding Bella Attrice to victory in the 7th race at Saratoga Race Course. In 2009, Desormeaux won the Belmont Stakes for the first time when he rode Summer Bird to victory, followed by wins in the Travers Stakes and Jockey Club Gold Cup. Desormeaux commented after the latter win, "He's trying to be the best horse I've ever ridden. He was awesome today." The wins would earn the colt the Eclipse Award for Outstanding Three-Year-Old Colt.

== 2010–present ==
In 2010, Desormeaux teamed up with the filly Unrivaled Belle to score an upset win over Rachel Alexandra in the La Troienne Stakes. Later that year, Unrivaled Belle gave Desormeaux his fifth Breeders' Cup win when she upset Blind Luck in the Breeders' Cup Distaff.

On August 31, 2011, Desormeaux was arrested when he tapped a NYRA security guard with his car at Saratoga Race Course. Charged with second degree reckless endangerment, he later pleaded guilty to a reduced charge of disorderly conduct. His opportunities continued to dry up, causing his rank by North American earnings to drop from 15th in 2010 to 99th in 2013. In 2014, he failed to crack the top 100 for the first time in his career.

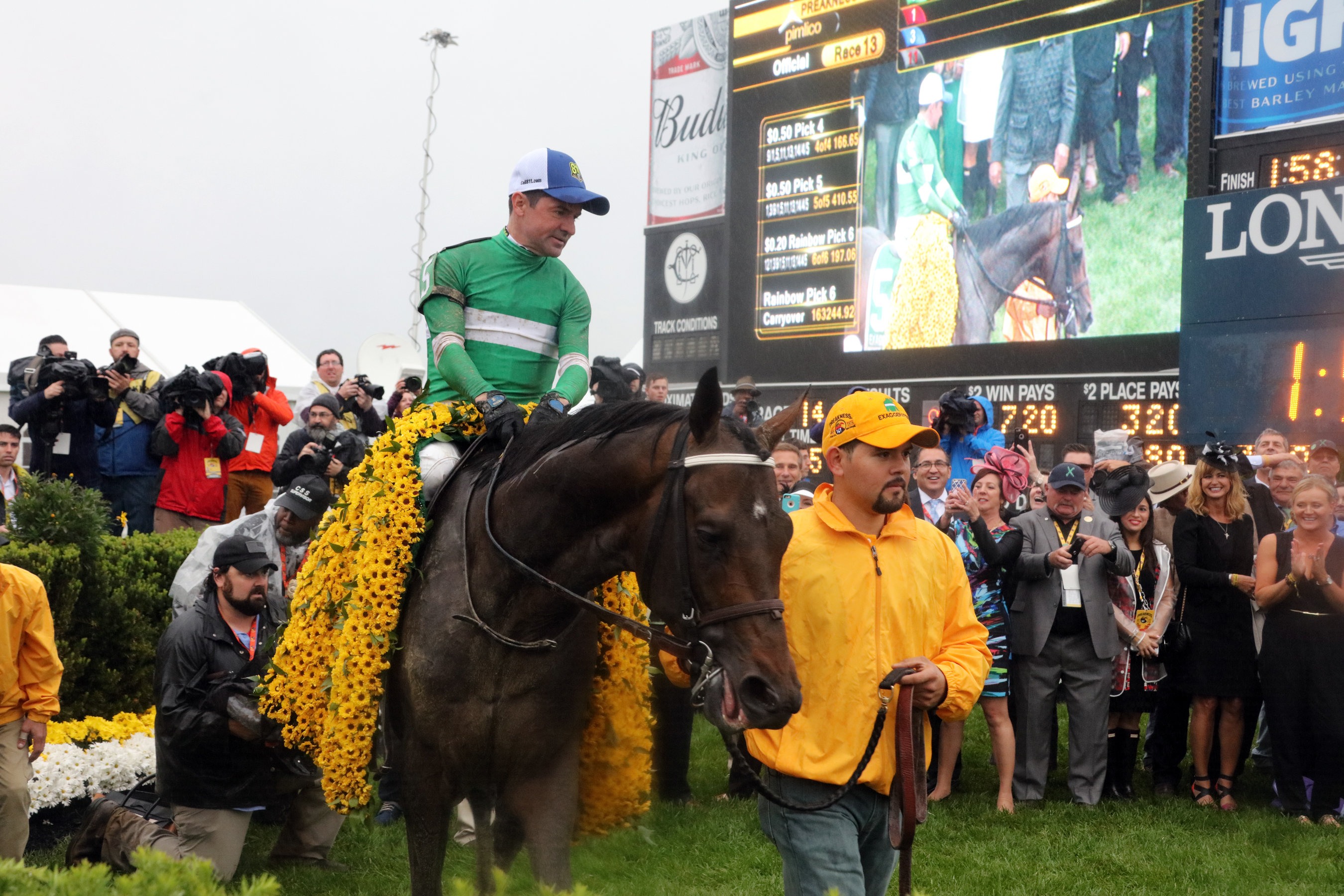
Desormeaux and Exaggerator in the Preakness winner's circle

In the summer of 2014, Keith Desormeaux helped bring Kent back into the limelight by offering the ride on a promising colt named Texas Red. Although Texas Red was third behind American Pharoah when the two met in the FrontRunner Stakes, Texas Red would win the Breeders' Cup Juvenile when American Pharoah was withdrawn due to injury. It was Keith's first Breeders' Cup win and Kent's fifth, and the first time brothers had combined to win a Breeders' Cup race. Unfortunately, Texas Red missed most of the 2015 racing season due to injury. When he finally did get his second chance at American Pharoah in the Travers Stakes, they both lost to Keen Ice, a colt that had previously been Desormeaux's mount.

The brothers next teamed up with another colt, Exaggerator. After an encouraging two-year-old campaign in 2015, Desormeaux rode the colt to an impressive come-from-behind victory in the 2016 Santa Anita Derby that made the colt the second betting choice for the 2016 Kentucky Derby. The Desormeaux brothers finished second at the Derby, but would celebrate victory together on May 21 when Exaggerator won the 2016 Preakness Stakes. Desormeaux credited his early years riding the Maryland circuit with giving him a crucial edge at Pimlico: "With these turns you want to paint the fence. We did, they didn't and—not for nothing—knowledge is power."

Following a drinking binge the night of his Preakness win, Desormeaux decided to address his alcohol issues. He said, "I hit bottom… I had a blackout. That's enough." With the encouragement of his wife and brother, on May 31, 2016, he checked himself into an alcohol rehabilitation program at Cirque Lodge in Sundance, Utah. After a stay of eight days, he flew to New York to prepare for the 2016 Belmont Stakes, accompanied by a coach who assisted him in maintaining sobriety. Exaggerator did not respond when asked to run in the homestretch and finished eleventh. Kent's brother, Keith, did not blame the jockey, but noted the horse had run all three legs of the Triple Crown series and had struggled with the Belmont track.

Desormeaux reached a milestone only 18 others in North America have met on Jan. 27, 2019 at Santa Anita Park, when he rode X S Gold to victory to secure his 6,000th win. As of his 6000th win, he climbed to no. 16 on the all-time wins list and no. 6 in mount earnings.

== Honors ==
In 2004, Kent Desormeaux was inducted into the National Museum of Racing and Hall of Fame. He has earned three Eclipse Awards, as outstanding apprentice jockey in 1987, and then as outstanding jockey in 1989 and 1992.

== Triple Crown summary ==
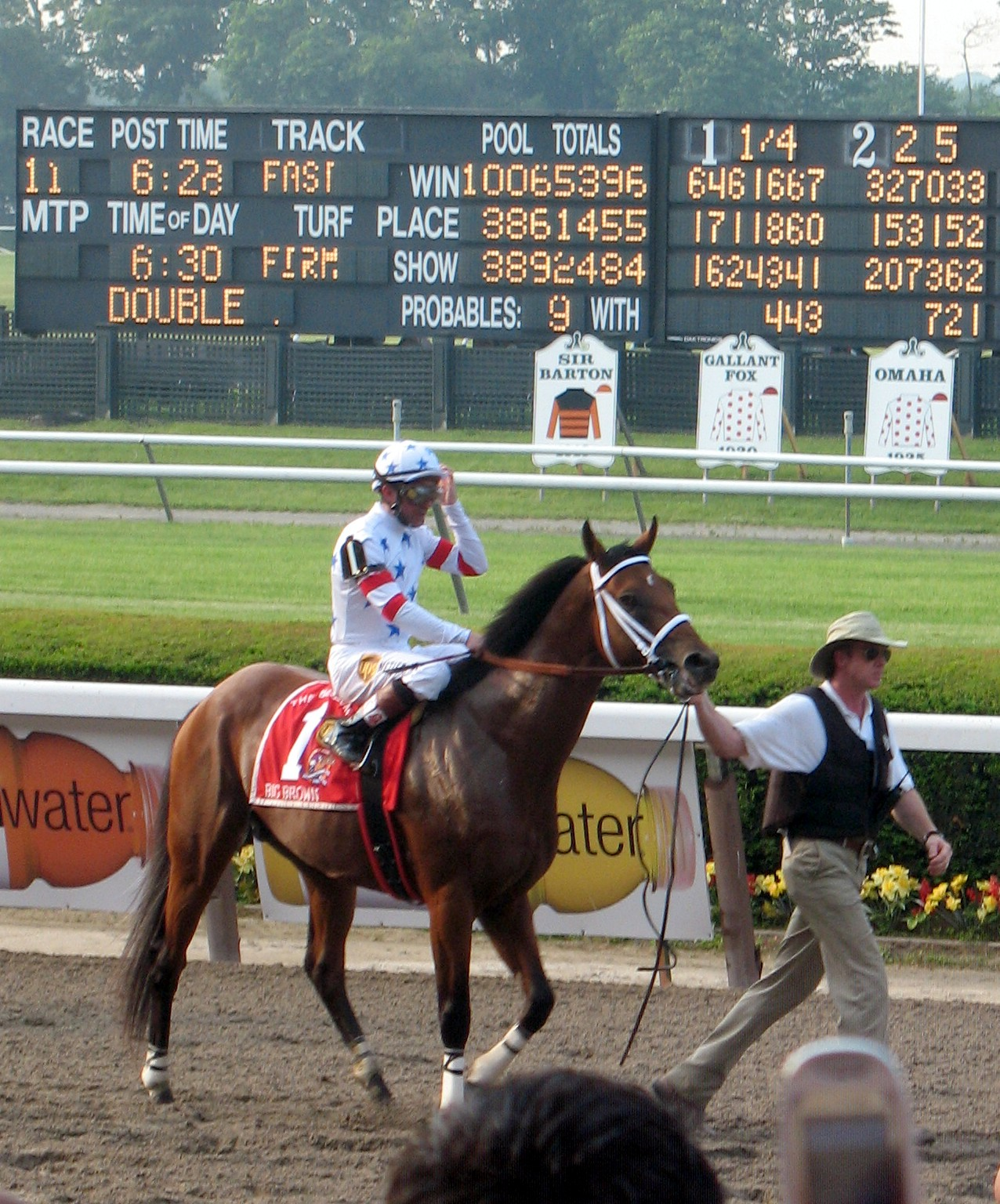
Desormeaux and Big Brown head into the gate for the 2008 Belmont Stakes.

- 7 wins, 6 seconds, 5 thirds

Kentucky Derby highlights:

- Won on: Real Quiet (1998), Fusaichi Pegasus (2000), Big Brown (2008)
- Second on: Exaggerator (2016)
- Third on: Pleasant Tap (1990), Imperialism (2004), Paddy O' Prado (2010), Dullahan (2012)

Preakness Stakes highlights:

- Won on: Real Quiet (1998), Big Brown (2008), Exaggerator (2016)
- Second on: Free House (1997), Fusaichi Pegasus (2000), Sweetnorthernsaint (2006)

Belmont Stakes highlights:

- Won on: Summer Bird (2009)
- Second on: Real Quiet (1998), Medaglia d'Oro (2002)
- Third on: Free House (1997), Keen Ice (2015)

== Year-end charts ==
Chart (2000–present)	Rank by earnings
National Earnings List for Jockeys 2000	4
National Earnings List for Jockeys 2001	25
National Earnings List for Jockeys 2002	10
National Earnings List for Jockeys 2003	31
National Earnings List for Jockeys 2004	15
National Earnings List for Jockeys 2005	46
National Earnings List for Jockeys 2006	17
National Earnings List for Jockeys 2007	11
National Earnings List for Jockeys 2008	3
National Earnings List for Jockeys 2009	4
National Earnings List for Jockeys 2010	15
National Earnings List for Jockeys 2011	52
National Earnings List for Jockeys 2012	99
National Earnings List for Jockeys 2013	142
National Earnings List for Jockeys 2014	25
National Earnings List for Jockeys 2015	24
National Earnings List for Jockeys 2016	17
National Earnings List for Jockeys 2017	22
National Earnings List for Jockeys 2018	38
National Earnings List for Jockeys 2019	113
National Earnings List for Jockeys 2020	278
National Earnings List for Jockeys 2021	61

Ranked by North American earnings
