= Sunny's Halo =

Canadian-bred Thoroughbred racehorse

- Sire: Halo
- Grandsire: Hail To Reason
- Dam: Mostly Sunny
- Damsire: Sunny
- Sex: Stallion
- Foaled: 1980
- Country: Canada
- Colour: Chestnut
- Breeder: David J. Foster
- Owner: David J. Foster
- Trainer: David C. Cross Jr.
- Record: 20: 9-3-2
- Earnings: $1,247,791

Major wins
- Colin Stakes (1982); Grey Stakes (1982); Coronation Futurity Stakes (1982); Swynford Stakes (1982); Rebel Stakes (1983); Arkansas Derby (1983); Super Derby (1983) American Classic Race wins: Kentucky Derby (1983)

Awards
- Canadian Champion 2-Yr-Old Colt (1982); Special Sovereign Award (1983)

Honours
- Canadian Horse Racing Hall of Fame (1986); Sunny's Halo Stakes at Woodbine Racetrack; Sunny's Halo Way in Bullard, Texas; Interred - Kentucky Derby Museum at Churchill Downs
- Last updated on October 5, 2006

Sunny's Halo (February 11, 1980 – June 3, 2003) was a Thoroughbred racehorse who won the 1983 Kentucky Derby. In 1986, Sunny's Halo was inducted into the Canadian Horse Racing Hall of Fame.

== Background ==
Foaled at Oshawa, Ontario, Sunny's Halo was owned and bred by Toronto stockbroker David J. Foster. He was trained by David Cross Jr.

== Racing career ==
The horse won 7 of 11 races at age two but stress fractures in both front shins ended his season earlier than planned. Nonetheless, his performance earned him a 1982 Sovereign Award. In an attempt to heal the ankle problem, he was one of the first horses to be treated at the equine indoor swimming pool designed and built in the early 1970s by Jesse Reynolds. His Getaway Farm was known as the finest location for layups and Thoroughbred therapy. It was located in King Ontario Canada north of Woodbine race track.

At age three, Sunny's Halo won the Arkansas Derby with jockey Eddie Delahoussaye aboard. The duo captured the Kentucky Derby against a very strong field that included future U.S. Racing Hall of Fame inductee Slew o' Gold. It marked the first time in history that an Arkansas Derby winner won the Kentucky Derby. After the race, he developed a rash and a return of the sore ankle affected his performance. The colt finished sixth in the Preakness Stakes and 4th in the Arlington Classic. Unable to compete in the June 26, 1983 Queen's Plate, he was back on the track in good health in the fall. In October he equaled the Louisiana Downs track record for 1¼ miles in winning the Super Derby by 12 lengths. He was scheduled to compete for the final time in November's Meadowlands Cup but the recurring ankle problem ended his career.

== Stud record ==
Syndicated for $7.5 million, Sunny's Halo was retired to stand at stud at Domino Stud in Lexington, Kentucky. He eventually went to a Texas breeding farm where he became that state's all-time leading sire by progeny earnings.

Sunny's Halo died in 2003 and was buried at the Double S Thoroughbred Farm in Bullard, Texas, where he last stood at stud. However, in July 2006, his remains were exhumed and returned to Louisville, Kentucky, to be re-interred at the Kentucky Derby Museum at Churchill Downs. His leading progeny include Race the Wild Wind (Santa Maria Handicap), Irgun (Wood Memorial) and Dispersal (Woodward Handicap).

== Pedigree ==
Pedigree of Sunny's Halo
Sire Halo	Hail To Reason	Turn-To	Royal Charger
Sire Halo	Hail To Reason	Turn-To	Source Sucree
Sire Halo	Hail To Reason	Nothirdchance	Blue Swords
Sire Halo	Hail To Reason	Nothirdchance	Galla Colors
Sire Halo	Cosmah	Cosmic Bomb	Pharamond
Sire Halo	Cosmah	Cosmic Bomb	Banish Fear
Sire Halo	Cosmah	Almahmoud	Mahmoud
Sire Halo	Cosmah	Almahmoud	Arbitrator
Dam Mostly Sunny	Sunny	Princequillo	Prince Rose
Dam Mostly Sunny	Sunny	Princequillo	Cosquila
Dam Mostly Sunny	Sunny	Sunshine Nell	Sun Again
Dam Mostly Sunny	Sunny	Sunshine Nell	Nellie Flag
Dam Mostly Sunny	Doily	Daumier	Niccolo Dellarca
Dam Mostly Sunny	Doily	Daumier	Donatella
Dam Mostly Sunny	Doily	Lecount	Count Fleet
Dam Mostly Sunny	Doily	Lecount	Lenore
