= Dr Fong =

American-bred Thoroughbred racehorse

- Sire: Kris S
- Grandsire: Roberto
- Dam: Spring Flight
- Damsire: Miswaki
- Sex: Stallion
- Foaled: 6 April 1995
- Country: United States
- Colour: Chestnut
- Breeder: Prestonwood Farm Inc
- Owner: The Thoroughbred Corp.
- Trainer: Henry Cecil; Neil Drysdale
- Record: 15: 5-2-0
- Earnings: £384,169

Major wins
- Autumn Stakes (1997); Newmarket Stakes (1998); St James's Palace Stakes (1998); Prix Eugène Adam (1998)

Awards
- Top-rated British three-year-old (1998)

Dr Fong (6 April 1995 – 25 August 2022) was an American-bred Thoroughbred racehorse and sire. He was foaled in Kentucky but sold as a yearling to race in Europe where he was trained in England by Henry Cecil. He won both his races as a two-year-old including the Autumn Stakes and emerged as a potentially top-class performer in the following spring with a win in the Newmarket Stakes. After finishing fourth in the Dante Stakes and third in the Prix Jean Prat he recorded his biggest victory when defeating Desert Prince in the St James's Palace Stakes. He went on to win the Prix Eugène Adam in France but was beaten by Desert Prince in the Queen Elizabeth II Stakes. Dr Fong was sent to race in the United States but failed to reproduce his best form and did not win again. Since his retirement from racing he has stood as a breeding stallion in Britain, France and Turkey and has sired several major winners.

== Background ==
Dr Fong was a chestnut horse with a white blaze and a white sock on his left hind leg bred in Kentucky by Prestonwood Farm Inc. He was sired by Kris S, who made little impact as a racehorse but sired the winners of more than 20 Group One/Grade I races, including Symboli Kris S, Brocco and Kris Kin. Dr Fong's dam Spring Flight won eight times when racing in the United States between 1989 and 1992, recording her best win in the Senorita Stakes. Apart from Dr Fong, she produced Lucky Story who won the Vintage Stakes and the Champagne Stakes in 2003

In July 1996, the yearling was consigned by Taylor Made Sales Agency to the Keeneland sale and was bought for $425,000 by Bluegrass Bloodstock. He then entered the ownership of Ahmed Salman's The Thoroughbred Corp. and was sent to Europe to be trained by Henry Cecil at Newmarket, Suffolk. He was ridden in his European races by Kieren Fallon.

== Racing career ==
=== 1997: two-year-old season ===
Dr Fong made his racecourse debut in a seven furlong maiden race at Newbury Racecourse on 18 September 1997. Starting at odds of 8/1 in a seventeen-runner field he took the lead inside the final furlong and won by half a length from the favourite Distant Mirage. In his only other race of the year he started 9/4 second favourite for the Listed Autumn Stakes over one mile at Ascot Racecourse in October. After being restrained by Fallon in the early stages he made his challenge down the centre of the straight, took the lead a furlong out and won by half a length from the filly Equity Princess with a twelve length gap back to the other two runners. After the race, Cecil commented that the colt who was being described as a "future star" would improve from the race, but would not run again that year.

=== 1998: three-year-old season ===
On 1 May Dr Fong made his three-year-old debut in the ten furlong Newmarket Stakes. Starting the 11/4 favourite against five opponents he pulled hard against Fallon's attempts to restrain him but maintained his unbeaten record, taking the lead a furlong out and winning by half a length from the Barry Hills-trained Sensory. Following his victory, he became regarded as a serious contender for The Derby with very good "vibes" reportedly coming from the Henry Cecil stable. Twelve days later he ran in one of the most important Derby trials, the Group Two Dante Stakes at York Racecourse and started 3/1 second favourite behind Border Arrow who had finished third in the 2000 Guineas. He briefly took the lead two furlongs out but faded in the closing stages and finished fourth behind Saratoga Springs, City Honours and Border Arrow. City Honours and Border Arrow went on to finish second and third behind High-Rise in the Derby. Dr Fong bypassed the Derby and reappeared in the Prix Jean Prat at Chantilly Racecourse on 31 May. He started the 1.3/1 favourite and finished strongly, but in a five-horse "blanket finish" he finished third, beaten a neck and a nose by Almutawakel and Gold Away.

Dr Fong was brought back in distance for the 153rd running of the St James's Palace Stakes over one mile at Royal Ascot on 16 June. The 2/1 favourite was the Peter Chapple-Hyam trained Victory Note who had won the Poule d'Essai des Poulains on his last start with Dr Fong next in the betting on 4/1 alongside the Irish 2000 Guineas winner Desert Prince. The best of the other five runners appeared to be Fa-Eq (runner up in the Irish Guineas) and the Duke of Devonshire's Duck Row. Fallon restrained the colt towards the rear as Desert Prince set the pace, before making his challenge on the outside in the straight. He caught Desert Prince in the final strides and won by a neck, with a gap of three and a half lengths back to Duck Row in third place. After the race Cecil commented "Kieren was a bit upset about his ride in France and thinks he should have won. But I was very pleased with him here- he showed what a great jockey he is". In July Dr Fong ran in France again when he carried top weight of 130 pounds in the Prix Eugène Adam over 2000 metres at Maisons-Laffitte Racecourse, with his main opponent appearing to be the Prix Noailles winner Special Quest. He took the lead 200 metres out but hung to the left as he tired in the closing stages and prevailed by only a nose from the Pascal Bary-trained Aware.

On his final European start, Dr Fong faced Desert Prince again in the Queen Elizabeth II Stakes over one mile at Ascot on 26 September. Before the race, Cecil reported that the colt was in very good form but said that his optimum trip was probably nine furlongs. He stayed on well in the last quarter mile but could not match the pace of his rival and was beaten half a length with the other beaten horses included Among Men (Sussex Stakes), Muhtathir (Celebration Mile), Cape Cross, Second Empire (Grand Critérium) and Almushtarak (Sandown Mile).

In the autumn on 1998 the colt was sent to the United States to be trained by Neil Drysdale. He ran twice in California, with Kent Desormeaux taking the ride on both occasions. He finished second in the Oak Tree Derby at Santa Anita Park on 1 November and fifth when favourite for the Grade One Hollywood Derby four weeks later.

=== 1999: four-year-old season ===
In 1999 Dr Fong remained in the United States where he ran four times without winning. His best effort of the season came on his debut when he was tried on dirt for the first time and finished second in the Strub Stakes. He went on to finish fourth in the Santa Anita Handicap, the Oaklawn Handicap and the American Handicap. Dr Fong was then moved to the stable of John C. Kimmel but made only one more appearance. Returning to turf, he started favourite for the Grade III Fourstardave Handicap at Saratoga Race Course in August but ran poorly and finished eighth of the eleven runners.

== Assessment ==
In the International Classification, published in January 1999, Dr Fong was rated the best British three-year-old colt of 1998, and the second best of his age and sex in Europe one pound behind Desert Prince.

== Stud record ==
After he retired from racing, Dr Fong returned to England and became a breeding stallion from 2000 until 2004 at Lord Hartington's Side Hill Stud in Newmarket. At the same time, he also shuttled back and forth to Widden Stud in Australia for half of his years there between 2000 and 2002. Then, he was transferred to stand in at the Highclere Stud from 2005 until 2009. He moved to Haras du Thenney in Normandy where he stood for four years from 2010 until 2013 before being sold and for another stud duty in Turkey between 2014 and 2019. He died on 25 August 2022.

His best winners have included Shamdinan (Secretariat Stakes), Ask for the Moon (Prix Saint-Alary), Aoife Alainn (Premio Lydia Tesio), Testa Rossi (Miss Grillo Stakes), Celimene (Prix Penelope), Diamond Dove (Preis der Winterkönigin) and Beatrice (Schwarzgold-Rennen).

== Pedigree ==
Pedigree of Dr Fong (USA), chestnut stallion, 1995
Sire Kris S. (USA) 1977	Roberto (USA); 1969	Hail To Reason	Turn-To
Sire Kris S. (USA) 1977	Roberto (USA); 1969	Hail To Reason	Nothirdchance
Sire Kris S. (USA) 1977	Roberto (USA); 1969	Bramalea	Nashua
Sire Kris S. (USA) 1977	Roberto (USA); 1969	Bramalea	Rarelea
Sire Kris S. (USA) 1977	Sharp Queen (USA); 1965	Princequillo	Prince Rose
Sire Kris S. (USA) 1977	Sharp Queen (USA); 1965	Princequillo	Cosquilla
Sire Kris S. (USA) 1977	Sharp Queen (USA); 1965	Bridgework	Occupy
Sire Kris S. (USA) 1977	Sharp Queen (USA); 1965	Bridgework	Feale Bridge
Dam Spring Flight (USA) 1987	Miswaki USA; 1978	Mr. Prospector	Raise a Native
Dam Spring Flight (USA) 1987	Miswaki USA; 1978	Mr. Prospector	Gold Digger
Dam Spring Flight (USA) 1987	Miswaki USA; 1978	Hopespringseternal	Buckpasser
Dam Spring Flight (USA) 1987	Miswaki USA; 1978	Hopespringseternal	Rose Bower
Dam Spring Flight (USA) 1987	Coco La Investment (USA); 1975	Coco la Terreur	Nearctic
Dam Spring Flight (USA) 1987	Coco La Investment (USA); 1975	Coco la Terreur	Ciboulette
Dam Spring Flight (USA) 1987	Coco La Investment (USA); 1975	Great Investment	Saidam
Dam Spring Flight (USA) 1987	Coco La Investment (USA); 1975	Great Investment	Modern (Family: 6-a)
