= 1998 Kentucky Derby =

Horse race

124th Kentucky Derby
- Kentucky Derby
- Location: Churchill Downs
- Date: May 2, 1998
- Winning horse: Real Quiet
- Jockey: Kent Desormeaux
- Trainer: Bob Baffert
- Owner: Mike Pegram
- Conditions: Fast
- Surface: Dirt
- Attendance: 143,215

The 1998 Kentucky Derby was the 124th running of the Kentucky Derby, run by three-year-old Thoroughbreds at a distance of 1+^{1}/_{4} miles (10 furlongs; 2,012 metres). The 1998 race took place on May 2, 1998, with 143,215 people in attendance.

== Payout ==
The 124th Kentucky Derby Payout Schedule

Program Number	Horse Name	Win	Place	Show
2	Real Quiet	$ 18.80	$8.80	$5.80
12	Victory Gallop	-	$13.00	$7.60
7	Indian Charlie	-	-	$4.20

- $2 Exacta: (2-12) Paid $291.80
- $2 Trifecta: (2-12-7) Paid $1,221.00
- $1 Superfecta: (2-12-7-3) Paid $3,007.40

== Full results ==
Finished	Post	Horse	Jockey	Trainer	Owner	Time / behind
1st	3	Real Quiet	Kent Desormeaux	Bob Baffert	Mike Pegram	2:02.38
2nd	13	Victory Gallop	Alex Solis	W. Elliott Walden	Prestonwood Farm, Inc.	
3rd	8	Indian Charlie	Gary Stevens	Bob Baffert	Hal Earnhardt & John R. Gaines Racing LLC	
4th	4	Halory Hunter	Corey Nakatani	Nick Zito	Celtic Pride Stable	
5th	11	Cape Town	Jerry D. Bailey	D. Wayne Lukas	Overbrook Farm	
6th	10	Parade Ground	Shane Sellers	Neil J. Howard	W. S. Farish III & Stephen Hilbert	
7th	6	Hanuman Highway	David Flores	Kathy Walsh	Budget Stable	
8th	7	Favorite Trick	Pat Day	William I. Mott	Joseph LaCombe	
9th	1	Nationalore	Goncalino Almeida	Myung Kwon Cho	Myung Kwon Cho	
10th	14	Old Trieste	Robby Albarado	Mike Puype	Cobra Farms, Inc.	
11th	5	Chilito	Gary Boulanger	H. Graham Motion	Lazy Lane Farms, Inc.	
12th	15	Robinwould	Earlie Fires	Jerry Calvin	Dee & William Davenport	
13th	12	Artax	Chris McCarron	Randy Bradshaw	Paraneck Stable	
14th	9	Rock and Roll	Francisco Torres	William I. Mott	Jenny Craig & Madeleine Paulson	
15th	2	Basic Trainee	John Velazquez	Jorge Romero	Luis A. Gambotto & Enrique Ocejo	
