= David C. Cross Jr. =

Canadian-American horse trainer (1935–2019)

David Cross
Personal information
- Born: December 19, 1935
- Died: May 29, 2019 (aged 83) Lexington, Kentucky, U.S.

Horse racing career
- Sport: Horse racing
- Career wins: 3,229

Major racing wins
- Bison City Stakes (1974); Fury Stakes (1974); Woodstock Stakes (1975); Marine Stakes (1975); Dominion Day Stakes (1976); Display Stakes (1979); Autumn Stakes (1981); Colin Stakes (1982); Grey Stakes (1982); Coronation Futurity Stakes (1982); Swynford Stakes (1982); Rebel Stakes (1983, 1991); Arkansas Derby (1983); Super Derby (1983); CTBA Marian Stakes (1994); La Cañada Stakes (1995); Rushaway Stakes (1996); Bay Meadows Lassie Stakes (1997); Bustles & Bows Stakes (1997); Lexington Stakes (1998); Ohio Derby (1998); Remington Park Derby (1998) U.S. Triple Crown series: Kentucky Derby (1983)

Honors
- Canadian Horse Racing Hall of Fame (2006)

Significant horses
- Sunny's Halo, Big Destiny, Classic Cat, Decent Davey, Snow Game, Quintana

David C. Cross Jr. (December 19, 1935 - May 29, 2019) was a Canadian-born Canadian Horse Racing Hall of Fame trainer of Thoroughbred racehorses who race-conditioned the Canadian-bred colt Sunny's Halo to wins in the 1983 Kentucky Derby, Arkansas Derby and Super Derby.

David Cross was raised in the Victoria and Vancouver, British Columbia areas and saddled his first winner in 1957 at Longacres racetrack.

He made his second appearance in the Kentucky Derby in 1991, finishing sixth with Quintana. In his only other Triple Crown appearance, for owner Gary Garber he trained Classic Cat to a third-place finish in the 1998 Preakness Stakes.

David Cross retired in 2000 but returned to training Thorughbreds in 2004 before retiring permanently on July 23, 2012, saddling his last runner that day at Fort Erie Race Track.
