= Cape Verdi =

Irish-bred Thoroughbred racehorse

- Racing silks of Robert Sangster; Maktoum Al Maktoum & Godolphin
- Sire: Caerleon
- Grandsire: Nijinsky
- Dam: Afrique Bleu Azur
- Damsire: Sagace
- Sex: Mare
- Foaled: 3 February 1995
- Died: 20 September 2013
- Country: Ireland
- Colour: Bay
- Breeder: Swettenham Stud
- Owner: Robert Sangster; Maktoum Al Maktoum; Godolphin
- Trainer: Peter Chapple-Hyam; Saeed bin Suroor
- Record: 8: 3-1-1
- Earnings: £195,930

Major wins
- Lowther Stakes (1997); 1000 Guineas (1998)

Awards
- European Champion Three-Year-Old Filly (1998)
- Last updated on August 25, 2007

Cape Verdi is a retired, Irish-bred Thoroughbred racehorse. She was trained in England and Dubai during a racing career which consisted of eight races between May 1997 and July 1999. In 1998 she won the 1000 Guineas by five lengths and was the beaten favourite in The Derby. She was named the European Champion Three-Year-Old Filly at the 1998 Cartier Racing Awards. Cape Verdi was retired after two unsuccessful races as a four-year-old in 1999.

== Background ==
Cape Verdi, a dark-coated bay filly, was bred in Ireland by her owner, Robert Sangster's Swettenham Stud. Her sire, Caerleon, won the Prix du Jockey Club and the Benson & Hedges Gold Cup in 1983 and went on to become an "excellent" stallion, siring the winners of more than 700 races including Generous, Marienbard and Warrsan. Her dam Afrique Bleu Azur finished last on her only racecourse appearance, but was well bred, being a sister of the Breeders' Cup Classic winner Arcangues.

Cape Verdi was first sent into training with Peter Chapple-Hyam at Manton, Wiltshire. After her third race she was bought by Maktoum Al Maktoum and at the end of her first season her ownership was transferred to the Maktoum family's Godolphin organisation. She was then moved to the stable of Saeed bin Suroor, spending her winters in Dubai before returning to race in England in summer.

Her name was reported to be an accidental misspelling of Cape Verde.

== Racing career ==
=== 1997: two-year-old season ===
Cape Verdi began her career in a maiden race at the Guineas meeting at Newmarket in May for which she was made odds-on favourite. She started slowly but was soon racing with the leaders before taking the lead a furlong out and winning by two lengths from the colt Trans Island, a future Group Race winner. Cape Verdi again took on colts in her second race when sent to Royal Ascot for the Chesham Stakes. She was held up in the early stages by John Reid before moving easily through to contest the lead in the last quarter mile. In the closing stages, the colt Central Park (a future double Group One winner) ran on more strongly and beat the filly by one and a half lengths.

Cape Verdi was off the course for two months before running in the Lowther Stakes at York in which she was matched against the Princess Margaret Stakes winner Embassy. Reid once again held the filly up before challenging in the final quarter mile. Cape Verdi ran on strongly to catch Embassy in the final strides and win by a short head. The result was not decisive; Embassy had been carrying three pounds more than Cape Verdi, and appeared to have been given an easy race by Pat Eddery. Cape Verdi was however, made 11/8 favourite when the two fillies met again in the Group One Cheveley Park Stakes at Newmarket in October. The race was her last for Chapple-Hyam's stable as she had been bought by Maktoum Al Maktoum and was about to join the Godolphin team. Cape Verdi was held up as usual, but when Reid asked her to quicken she failed to respond, finishing a well-beaten fourth behind Embassy.

Embassy and Cape Verdi were sent to Godolphin's winter base in Dubai as the first and second favourites for the 1000 Guineas.

=== 1998: three-year-old season ===
In Dubai Cape Verdi seemed to flourish, and after a "sparkling" performances in a private trial race she supplanted Embassy as favourite for the Guineas.

Cape Verdi returned from Dubai in May 1998 and was sent straight to the 1000 Guineas without a prep race. Cape Verdi was made 100/30 joint favourite and produced the best performance of her career. Ridden for the first time by Frankie Dettori, she moved up to take the lead a furlong out before "surging" clear and winning by a growing margin of five lengths from the Irish-trained Shahtoush. The Independent described the performance as an "arrogant dismissal" of the opposition while Dettori was enthusiastic: "I've never known a horse like her and she's amazing for a filly". Bookmakers responded by offering her at 2/1 for the Oaks but within days were reporting significant support for the filly in the betting for the Derby.

After weeks of speculation it was announced on 28 May that Cape Verdi's owners would pay a £75,000 supplementary fee to run her in be the Derby, a race which no filly had won since Fifinella in 1916 and which only two fillies attempted in the previous fifty years. Confidence and interest in the filly grew, and she was made favourite for the race. Her position looked even stronger when Shahtoush won the Oaks on the day before the Derby. On the day of the race itself she headed the betting at 11/4, ahead of the Irish colts Second Empire (Grand Critérium) and King of Kings (2000 Guineas), becoming the first filly to start favourite for the race since Sceptre in 1902. She was held up in the early stages, but after being bumped and hampered by bigger, stronger opponents she made no impression in the straight and finished ninth of the fifteen runners, twelve lengths behind the winner High-Rise.

Cape Verdi was expected to return in the Sussex Stakes at Goodwood but a hairline fracture of the hind pastern, sustained in training, ruled her out for the rest of the season.

=== 1999: four-year-old season ===
It was more than a year after her run in the Derby that Cape Verdi reappeared in the Group Two Falmouth Stakes at Newmarket in July. Given the length of her absence her performance in finishing third to the French-trained Ronda after leading until the final furlong was promising one.

Cape Verdi started 7/2 second favourite for the Group One Nassau Stakes at Glorious Goodwood, but ran poorly, weakening in the closing stages and finishing last of the eight runners. Saeed bin Suroor was unable to give an immediate explanation for her performance.

Three weeks after her final race it was announced that Cape Verdi would be retired to Sheikh Mohammed's Gainsborough Stud.

== Assessment ==
At the 1999 Cartier Racing Awards Cape Verdi was named European Champion Three-Year-Old Filly, despite winning only one race that year. She was also the highest rated European three-year-old filly in the official International Classification with a rating of 120.

She was assessed at a peak figure of 126 by Timeform.

The "Cape Verdi" is a Group Two race named in the filly's honour run in January at Meydan Racecourse in Dubai.

== Stud career ==
Cape Verdi has been bred to many leading stallions including Gone West, Dubai Millennium and Elusive Quality but has yet to produce a top class racehorse. She has produced minor winners in Benandonner and Salsa Verdi, both sired by Giant's Causeway and Nabucco, a stakes winner in England during 2013.

- 2002 Dubai Opera (USA) : Bay filly, foaled 5 March, by Dubai Millennium (GB) – Unraced, dam of winners Rebel Song (IRE)(2009, by Refuse To Bend <IRE>) and Grigolo (2012, by Shamardal <USA>)
- 2003 Benandonner (USA) : Chesnut colt (gelded), foaled 21 March, by Giant's Causeway (USA) – won 13 races and £148,883 from 117 starts in Britain 2006–15
- 2004 Salsa Verdi (USA) : Bay filly, foaled 17 April, by Giant's Causeway (USA) – won once and placed twice from 3 races in England 2007
- 2005 Paracel (USA) : Bay filly, foaled 8 May, by Gone West (USA) – won in France, dam of multiple winner I'm Back (IRE) by Exceed And Excel (AUS)
- 2009 Nabucco (GB) : Bay colt, foaled 10 March, by Dansili (GB) – won 4 races including LR James Seymour Stakes, Newmarket in England 2012/13
- 2010 Thouwra (IRE) : Bay colt, foaled 28 March, by Pivotal (GB) – won 3 races and second six times from 11 starts in England 2012–13
- 2011 Tarrafal (IRE) : Bay colt, foaled 19 April, by Shamardal (USA) – placed four times from 9 starts in Britain 2014

== Pedigree ==
Pedigree of Cape Verdi (IRE), bay mare, 1995
Sire Caerleon (USA) 1980	Nijinsky (CAN); 1967	Northern Dancer	Nearctic
Sire Caerleon (USA) 1980	Nijinsky (CAN); 1967	Northern Dancer	Natalma
Sire Caerleon (USA) 1980	Nijinsky (CAN); 1967	Flaming Page	Bull Page
Sire Caerleon (USA) 1980	Nijinsky (CAN); 1967	Flaming Page	Flaring Top
Sire Caerleon (USA) 1980	Foreseer; 1969	Round Table	Princequillo
Sire Caerleon (USA) 1980	Foreseer; 1969	Round Table	Knight's Daughter
Sire Caerleon (USA) 1980	Foreseer; 1969	Regal Gleam	Hail To Reason
Sire Caerleon (USA) 1980	Foreseer; 1969	Regal Gleam	Miz Carol
Dam Afrique Bleu Azur (USA) 1987	Sagace; 1980	Luthier	Klairon
Dam Afrique Bleu Azur (USA) 1987	Sagace; 1980	Luthier	Flute Enchantee
Dam Afrique Bleu Azur (USA) 1987	Sagace; 1980	Seneca	Chaparral
Dam Afrique Bleu Azur (USA) 1987	Sagace; 1980	Seneca	Schonbrunn
Dam Afrique Bleu Azur (USA) 1987	Albertine; 1981	Irish River	Riverman
Dam Afrique Bleu Azur (USA) 1987	Albertine; 1981	Irish River	Irish Star
Dam Afrique Bleu Azur (USA) 1987	Albertine; 1981	Almyre	Wild Risk
Dam Afrique Bleu Azur (USA) 1987	Albertine; 1981	Almyre	Ad Gloriam (Family: 8-f)
