= Nationalore =

American Thoroughbred racehorse

- Breed: Thoroughbred
- Sire: Video Ranger
- Grandsire: Cox's Ridge
- Dam: Romantic Jet
- Damsire: Tri Jet
- Sex: Gelding
- Foaled: 1995
- Died: July 12, 2000
- Country: United States
- Breeder: Myung Kwon Cho
- Owner: Myung Kwon Cho
- Trainer: Myung Kwon Cho
- Earnings: $318,227

Nationalore (1995–2000) was a black thoroughbred gelding who contended the 1998 Kentucky Derby, despite having won none of his previous fifteen races, a record number at the time. He broke down during a race in 2000 and was euthanized. In his career, he finished in second or third place fourteen times. Nationalore was racing's richest maiden (non-winning horse), with earnings of $318,227.

Nationalore was by Video Ranger (fourth in the 1990 Kentucky Derby) out of Romantic Jet. He was trained and bred by his owner, Myung Kwon Cho.

As a two-year-old, he ran ten races, finishing second twice. That year, his fourth race in 34 days, and his most lucrative result, was third place in the Grade I Breeders' Cup Juvenile, which earned him $120,000.

As a three-year-old, he was entered into the Kentucky Derby with career earnings of $283,767 from 15 races. Although Nationalore had won no races when he entered the Derby, he had earned more money than seven other starters in the race. Before the race, his assistant trainer, Rafael Martinez, said that Nationalore was better suited to distances longer than those in the races he had been running, and the Derby, being a quarter-mile longer, would suit him better. Nationalore went on to finish ninth from a field of 15 runners.

Nationalore was five years old when he was euthanized on 12 July 2000 after falling in a race at Hollywood Park and fracturing his shoulder. His final race was his 26th start.
