= High-Rise (horse) =

Irish-bred Thoroughbred racehorse

- Racing colours of Obaid Al Maktoum
- Sire: High Estate
- Grandsire: Shirley Heights
- Dam: High Tern
- Damsire: High Line
- Sex: Stallion
- Foaled: 1995
- Country: Ireland
- Colour: Bay
- Breeder: Mohammed Obaid Al Maktoum
- Owner: Mohammed Obaid al Maktoum; Godolphin Racing
- Trainer: Luca Cumani (1997–98); Saeed bin Suroor (1999–2000); Kiaran McLaughlin (2000)
- Record: 13: 5-2-2
- Earnings: £1,209,785

Major wins
- Lingfield Derby Trial (1998); Epsom Derby (1998); Dubai City of Gold (2000)
- Last updated on August 24, 2007

High-Rise (3 May 1995 – 13 June 2012) was a Thoroughbred race horse and sire, bred in Ireland, but trained in the United Kingdom, Dubai and the United States. He is best known as the winner of the Derby in 1998.

== Background ==
High-Rise was a bay horse bred in Ireland by his owner Mohammed Obaid Al Maktoum a cousin of Sheikh Mohammed.

He was the best offspring of his sire, High Estate the Champion European two-year-old of 1988. His dam, High Tern was a minor winner, and a sister of High Hawk, a top-class stayer (Premio Roma) who produced the Breeders' Cup Turf winner In The Wings.

High-Rise was first sent into training with Luca Cumani at Newmarket, Suffolk.

== Racing career ==
=== 1997: two-year-old season ===
High-Rise made his racecourse debut at the very end of the 1997 British flat-racing season, when he was entered in an eighteen-runner maiden race at Doncaster. He ran prominently, but after looking outpaced in the straight, he produced a strong late to lead close to the finish and win by a short head.

=== 1998: three-year-old season ===
==== Spring ====
High-Rise began his three-year-old season with a run in a minor stakes event at Pontefract. Starting the 2/1 favourite he was moved up to take the lead a furlong from the finish and quickly went clear of the field. His jockey, Jason Weaver, eased the colt down in the closing stages as he recorded a three and a half length win.

He was then moved up in class for the Group Three Lingfield Derby Trial. As its name suggests, this race is often an important indicator of Derby form, and had produced several winners of the Epsom race, including Kahyasi, trained by Luca Cumani ten years previously. Ridden by Frankie Dettori High-Rise took the lead two furlongs out and ran on strongly under pressure to win by a neck from Sadian. After the race, Cumani described High-Rise as "a very nice horse" with "a real turn of foot", but seemed undecided about running him in the Derby.

==== Summer ====
The favourite for the 1998 Derby was the filly Cape Verdi, winner of the 1,000 Guineas, who was ridden by Frankie Dettori. Her main danger was expected to come from the Ballydoyle colts Second Empire and King of Kings, with High-Rise being largely ignored as a 20/1 outsider, despite being the only unbeaten horse in the field. Ridden by Olivier Peslier, High-Rise was held up in the early stages and was still towards the rear as the field turned into the straight, led by the 150/1 outsider Sunshine Street. From two furlongs out, High-Rise began to make rapid progress, catching Sunshine Street to take the lead a furlong from the finish. The only challenger was Cape Verdi's stable companion, City Honours, who was produced with a strong run along the inside by John Reid. The two colts raced alongside each other in the closing strides and reached the line almost together, with High-Rise, under a strong ride from Peslier, winning by a head. Peslier, who was cautioned by the stewards for his frequent use of the whip, praised the colt's speed and courage: "He absolutely flew... he's a fighter".

Plans to run High-Rise against the Prix du Jockey-Club winner Dream Well in the Irish Derby, which would have involved paying a £75,000 supplementary fee, were abandoned after Cumani decided that the horse needed more time to recover between races.

High-Rise did not run again till late July, when he was made 11/4 favourite for the King George VI and Queen Elizabeth Stakes at Ascot He raced more prominently than at Epsom and produced a sustained run in the straight, despite hanging to the left under pressure, and finished second, a length behind Swain. Although he had been defeated, it was arguably his best performance, as he finished ahead of notable horses such as Royal Anthem, Daylami and Silver Patriarch.

Following the race, High-Rise's connections announced that the colt would stay in training as a four-year-old.

==== Autumn ====
In October, he made his only other appearance of the season, when he started 4/1 for the Prix de l'Arc de Triomphe on soft ground at Longchamp. Ridden by Mick Kinane he stayed on strongly after being unable to find a clear run in the closing stages and finished seventh, beaten three lengths, behind Sagamix.

The horse was being prepared for the Breeders' Cup Turf when it was announced that he would be sent to Saeed bin Suroor to be prepared for the following year's Dubai World Cup. Cumani described the decision as "a bit of a shock"

=== 1999: four-year-old season ===
Before the start of the 1999 season, High-Rise was transferred to the ownership of Godolphin Racing. Although he was believed to be one of Godolphin's best hopes for the Dubai World Cup, and was described as being in "cracking form" prior to the race he ran very disappointingly, finishing tailed off last of the eight runners behind Almutawakel.

High-Rise was then off the course for almost six months. On his reappearance, he ran a promising race in the Arc Trial at Newbury finishing three quarters of a length second to Fantastic Light, with the two finishing nine lengths clear of the other runners. At Newmarket a month later he finished sixth, beaten three lengths the Champion Stakes, finishing strongly after being blocked and losing his place in a rough race.

High-Rise's intended target for the end of the season was the Breeders' Cup Turf, but when nineteen runners were entered for the fourteen runner race, he was named only third reserve, and his connections re-routed him to the Japan Cup. The change in plan proved profitable as High-Rise earned £268,000 in the Tokyo race, in which he finished third behind Special Week and Indigenous, ahead of notable performers such as Montjeu, Borgia and Stay Gold.

=== 2000: five-year-old season ===
High-Rise returned to Dubai in the winter of 1999/2000. In February, he recorded his first win since the Derby when he took the Dubai City of Gold "comfortably" by two and a half lengths. The performance was described by one trade paper as a "brilliant return to form." A month later he finished third of sixteen runners to Fantastic Light in the Dubai Sheema Classic, but returned from the race with an ankle injury which kept him off the racecourse for the next ten weeks.

Before his next race High-Rise's ownership was transferred back to Mohammed Obaid Al Maktoum and the horse was moved to the stable of Kiaran McLaughlin in New York. He made only one start for his new trainer, finishing last of the eight runners behind Manndar in the Manhattan Handicap at Belmont Park.

Following this race it was announced that High-Rise had fractured a sesamoid bone and would not race again. He was then retired to stud.

== Race record ==
Date	Race	Dist (f)	Course	Class	Prize (£K)	Odds	Runners	Placing	Margin	Time	Jockey	Trainer
7 November 1997	EBF Cooperative Bank Maiden Stakes	7	Doncaster	M	3	8/1	18	1	Short head	1:31.42	Royston Ffrench	Luca Cumani
21 April 1998	Buttercross Limited Stakes	10	Pontefract		5	2/1	8	1	3.5	2:21.10	Jason Weaver	Luca Cumani
9 May 1998	EBF Hedgehope Maiden Stakes	12	Lingfield	3	31	15/8	6	1	Neck	2:24.80	Frankie Dettori	Luca Cumani
6 June 1998	Derby	12	Epsom	1	598	20/1	15	1	Head	2:33.88	Olivier Peslier	Luca Cumani
25 July 1998	King George VI & Queen Elizabeth Stakes	12	Ascot	1	354	11/4	8	2	1	2:29.06	Olivier Peslier	Luca Cumani
4 October 1998	Prix de l'Arc de Triomphe	12	Longchamp	1	404	4/1	14	7	3.25	2:34.50	Michael Kinane	Luca Cumani
28 March 1999	Dubai World Cup	10	Nad Al Sheba	1	10		8	8	45		Frankie Dettori	Saeed bin Suroor
19 September 1999	Arc Trial	11	Newbury	L	28	10/11	6	2	0.75	2:21.51	Olivier Peslier	Saeed bin Suroor
16 October 1999	Champion Stakes	10	Newmarket Rowley	1	228	5/1	13	6	3	2:05.57	Olivier Peslier	Saeed bin Suroor
28 November 1999	Japan Cup	12	Tokyo	1	1071	19/1	15	3	1.5	2:25.50	Frankie Dettori	Saeed bin Suroor
24 February 2000	Dubai City of Gold	12	Nad Al Sheba	L	34		7	1	2.5		Frankie Dettori	Saeed bin Suroor
25 March 2000	Dubai Sheema Classic	12	Nad Al Sheba	3	731		16	3	5		Frankie Dettori	Saeed bin Suroor
10 June 2000	Manhattan Handicap	10	Belmont Park	1	146	3/1	9	8	19.5	1:59.61	John R. Velazquez	Kiaran McLaughlin

== Assessment and honours ==
In the 1998 International Classification (the forerunner of the World Thoroughbred Racehorse Rankings) High-Rise was given a rating of 127, equal to Real Quiet, Victory Gallop and Dr Fong and one pound below the top-rated three-year-old Desert Prince.

High-Rise was given a peak Timeform rating of 130 In their book A Century of Champions, John Randall and Tony Morris rated High-Rise as an "inferior" Derby winner.

Since 1999, Pontefract Racecourse, where High-Rise won on his three-year-old debut, have staged a race named in his honour.

== Stud career ==
High-Rise stood as a stallion in Japan for the Darley organisation at the Lex Company stud, Shizunai at an initial fee of £8,000.

High-Rise returned to Ireland in 2004, to stand at the Park House Stud, County Carlow at a stud fee of €1,500. He was marketed as a National Hunt stallion.

== Pedigree ==
Pedigree of High-Rise (IRE), bay stallion, 1995
Sire High Estate (IRE) 1986	Shirley Heights; 1975	Mill Reef	Never Bend
Sire High Estate (IRE) 1986	Shirley Heights; 1975	Mill Reef	Milan Mill
Sire High Estate (IRE) 1986	Shirley Heights; 1975	Hardiemma	Hardicanute
Sire High Estate (IRE) 1986	Shirley Heights; 1975	Hardiemma	Grand Cross
Sire High Estate (IRE) 1986	Regal Beauty; 1981	Princely Native	Raise a Native
Sire High Estate (IRE) 1986	Regal Beauty; 1981	Princely Native	Charlo
Sire High Estate (IRE) 1986	Regal Beauty; 1981	Dennis Belle	Crafty Admiral
Sire High Estate (IRE) 1986	Regal Beauty; 1981	Dennis Belle	Evasion
Dam High Tern (IRE) 1982	High Line; 1966	High Hat	Hyperion
Dam High Tern (IRE) 1982	High Line; 1966	High Hat	Madonna
Dam High Tern (IRE) 1982	High Line; 1966	Time Call	Chanteur
Dam High Tern (IRE) 1982	High Line; 1966	Time Call	Aleria
Dam High Tern (IRE) 1982	Sunbittern; 1970	Sea Hawk	Herbager
Dam High Tern (IRE) 1982	Sunbittern; 1970	Sea Hawk	Sea Nymph
Dam High Tern (IRE) 1982	Sunbittern; 1970	Pantoufle	Panaslipper
Dam High Tern (IRE) 1982	Sunbittern; 1970	Pantoufle	Etoile de France (Family: 9-a)
