= King of Kings (horse) =

Irish-bred Thoroughbred racehorse

- Racing colours of Susan Magnier, carried by King of Kings in the 2000 Guineas
- Sire: Sadler's Wells
- Grandsire: Northern Dancer
- Dam: Zummerudd
- Damsire: Habitat
- Sex: Stallion
- Foaled: 27 February 1995
- Country: Ireland
- Colour: Bay
- Breeder: J. T. Jones & Ron Con Ltd
- Owner: Susan Magnier & Michael Tabor
- Trainer: Aidan O'Brien
- Record: 7:5-1-0
- Earnings: £324,270

Major wins
- Railway Stakes (1997); Tyros Stakes (1997); National Stakes (1997); 2000 Guineas (1998)

King of Kings (27 February 1995 – 23 February 2015) was an Irish Thoroughbred racehorse and sire. In a career that lasted from May 1997 to June 1998 he ran seven times and won five races. After establishing himself as one of the leading colts of his generation in Ireland as a two-year-old, when his wins included the Group One National Stakes, he recorded his most important win when he travelled to England to win the 2000 Guineas on his first start of 1998. After a disappointing run in The Derby he was retired to stud. He died in South Africa at the age of twenty.

== Background ==
King of Kings, a bay horse with a white star and three white feet was bred in Ireland by J. T. Jones & Ron Con Ltd. He was sired by the fourteen times Champion sire Sadler's Wells out of the mare Zummerudd. As a weanling, King of Kings was consigned by the Barronstown Stud to the Tattersalls sales in December 1995 where he was bought for 250,000 guineas by the bloodstock agent Dermot "Demi" O'Byrne on behalf of John Magnier's Coolmore organisation. Like many of Coolmore's horses, King of Kings' ownership details were altered from race to race: he was listed as the property of either Magnier's wife Susan, or a partnership of Susan Magnier and Michael Tabor.

== Racing career ==
=== 1997: two-year-old season ===
King of Kings raced five times at the Curragh as a two-year-old: in each race he was ridden by Christy Roche and started odds-on favourite. He began his career in a six furlong Maiden race in June, which he won by eight lengths at odds of 2/7. A month later he was moved up to Group Three class for the Railway Stakes over the same course and distance and won easily by a length from Danyross after taking the lead a furlong from the finish. He started 30/100 favourite for the Anglesey Stakes in July but was beaten a short-head by the filly Lady Alexander, having been "tenderly handled" by Roche in the closing stages. In August he was moved up in distance for the seven furlong Tyros Stakes in which he conceded weight to four opponents and won "comfortably" from the British-trained colt Sharp Play, despite drifting to the right in the closing stages. On his final start of the season, King of Kings ran in Ireland's most prestigious two-year-old race, the Group One National Stakes over one mile. Settled by Roche in the early stages, he was moved forward to take the lead a furlong from the finish and won by three quarters of a length from his stable companion Celtic Cavalier. He sustained a knee injury during the race and did not run again in 1997.

King of Kings had won four of his five races, but his performances had not lived up to his home reputation and his temperament had been questioned. There were also doubts about the value of his form – none of his rivals in the National Stakes had won a Group race – and he was not highly rated by the international handicappers. Roche, however, described King of Kings as "the best two-year-old I've ever ridden."

=== 1998: three-year-old season ===
On King of Kings' three-year-old debut he traveled away from the Curragh for the first time as he was sent to England for the 2000 Guineas at Newmarket on 2 May. The European Champion Two-Year-Old Xaar was made favourite at 10/11, with King of Kings, ridden by Mick Kinane the second choice in the betting on 7/2 and the Gran Criterium winner Lend a Hand the only other colt to be seriously supported at odds of 8/1. Kinane restrained King of Kings in the early stages as the running was made by Tamarisk before producing his mount with a sustained run down the centre of the course. Lend a Hand went to the front two furlongs from the finish but was immediately challenged by King of Kings who took the lead and ran on strongly to win by one and a quarter lengths. Border Arrow finished strongly to take third ahead of Xaar.

Following race O'Brien commented on the horse's growing maturity by saying that "he was a child last year, but is a man now". Addressing issues regarding the colt's attitude and style of racing, Kinane offered the opinion that "there is nothing wrong with his courage. He is just a bit of a showman."

King of Kings did not run again before The Derby on 6 June. Doubts about his stamina led to him being passed over by Kinane who rode his stable companion Second Empire. King of Kings was ridden by the veteran Pat Eddery and started the 11/2 third favourite behind the filly Cape Verdi and Second Empire. In the race King of Kings was never in contention and finished last of the fifteen runners behind High-Rise. He was subsequently found to be lame and examinations revealed a recurrence of his old knee injury. His retirement from racing was announced later that month.

== Assessment ==
Despite his successes as a two-year-old, King of Kings was not highly regarded by the International Classification published in January 1998. His rating of 111 place him sixteen pounds below the top-rated European colt Xaar and eight pounds behind his stable companion Second Empire, the winner of the Grand Critérium at Longchamp.

== Stud career ==
King of Kings was retired to stand as a stallion for his owners' Coolmore Stud organisation. He stood in Australia for one season and was then sent to the Ashford Stud at Versailles, Kentucky before returning to Australia in 2002. In November 2004 he was sold for an undisclosed sum to Gestut Sohrenhof in Switzerland. King of Kings was later sold to stand at the Somerset Stud at Mooi River in KwaZulu-Natal, South Africa. His most successful offspring have been the Australian-bred Group One winners King's Chapel and Reigning to Win.

King of Kings died of heart failure at the Fort Stud in South Africa on 23 February 2015. The stud's owner, Jill Fox said "I was very privileged to have had a horse like him in my care. He was super intelligent and loved his work when covering mares".

== Pedigree ==
Pedigree of King of Kings (IRE), bay stallion, 1995
Sire Sadler's Wells (USA) 1981	Northern Dancer; 1961	Nearctic	Nearco
Sire Sadler's Wells (USA) 1981	Northern Dancer; 1961	Nearctic	Lady Angela
Sire Sadler's Wells (USA) 1981	Northern Dancer; 1961	Natalma	Native Dancer
Sire Sadler's Wells (USA) 1981	Northern Dancer; 1961	Natalma	Almahmoud
Sire Sadler's Wells (USA) 1981	Fairy Bridge; 1975	Bold Reason	Hail to Reason
Sire Sadler's Wells (USA) 1981	Fairy Bridge; 1975	Bold Reason	Lalun
Sire Sadler's Wells (USA) 1981	Fairy Bridge; 1975	Special	Forli
Sire Sadler's Wells (USA) 1981	Fairy Bridge; 1975	Special	Thong
Dam Zummerudd (IRE) 1981	Habitat; 1966	Sir Gaylord	Turn-To
Dam Zummerudd (IRE) 1981	Habitat; 1966	Sir Gaylord	Somethingroyal
Dam Zummerudd (IRE) 1981	Habitat; 1966	Little Hut	Occupy
Dam Zummerudd (IRE) 1981	Habitat; 1966	Little Hut	Savage Beauty
Dam Zummerudd (IRE) 1981	Ampulla; 1974	Crowned Prince	Raise a Native
Dam Zummerudd (IRE) 1981	Ampulla; 1974	Crowned Prince	Gay Hostess
Dam Zummerudd (IRE) 1981	Ampulla; 1974	A. 1	Abernant
Dam Zummerudd (IRE) 1981	Ampulla; 1974	A. 1	Asti Spumante (Family:7)
