= Real Quiet =

American-bred Thoroughbred racehorse (1995–2010)

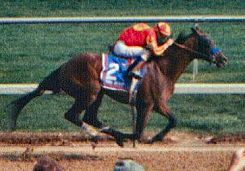
- Real Quiet at the 1998 Kentucky Derby
- Sire: Quiet American
- Grandsire: Fappiano
- Dam: Really Blue
- Damsire: Believe It
- Sex: Stallion
- Foaled: March 7, 1995
- Died: September 27, 2010 (aged 15)
- Country: United States
- Colour: Bay
- Breeder: Eduardo Gaviria
- Owner: Michael E. Pegram
- Trainer: Bob Baffert
- Record: 20: 6–5–6
- Earnings: $3,271,802

Major wins
- Hollywood Futurity (1997); Hollywood Gold Cup (1999); Pimlico Special (1999) American Triple Crown wins: Kentucky Derby (1998); Preakness Stakes (1998)

Awards
- U.S. Champion 3-Yr-Old Colt (1998)

Honours
- Real Quiet Stakes at Hollywood Park

Real Quiet (March 7, 1995 – September 27, 2010) was an American Champion Thoroughbred racehorse. He was nicknamed "The Fish" by his trainer due to his narrow frame. He is best remembered for winning the first two legs of American Triple Crown: the Kentucky Derby and the Preakness Stakes. He engaged in a contentious battle with Victory Gallop in all three Triple Crown races. His loss to Victory Gallop in the third leg, the Belmont Stakes, was the smallest margin of defeat ever, at only four inches.

He was bred by Eduardo Gaviria, a Colombian proprietor of two stud farms: one near Bogotá in Colombia and another, Little Hill Farm, in Ocala, Florida, where Real Quiet was foaled. Gaviria purchased mare Really Blue, in foal to Spend A Buck, at the 1990 Keeneland November sale for $37,000. Gaviria decided to breed Really Blue with Quiet American. The result was Real Quiet. However, the colt's crooked knees prompted Gaviria to sell him at a yearling auction to Michael E. Pegram for $17,000.

== Two-year-old season ==
Trained by Bob Baffert, racing as a two-year-old in 1997, Real Quiet started slowly, competing in seven races before getting his first win in a maiden special weight at Hollywood Park at 8 1/2 furlongs by three lengths. Later that season, he finished third in the $571,647 Indian Nations Futurity Cup at Santa Fe and third in the $200,000 Grade III Kentucky Jockey Club Stakes at Churchill Downs, losing to Cape Town. He finished the year with a score in the $1 million Hollywood Futurity at 8.5 furlongs, defeating Artax and Nationalore. He finished his two-year-old season with a record of 2–0–5 in nine starts with earnings of $381,122.

== Three-year-old season ==
Although still lightly regarded in a year with many quality three-year-olds competing, in 1998 Real Quiet was ridden to victory by jockey Kent Desormeaux in the Kentucky Derby. His Beyer Speed Figure recorded in the Hollywood Futurity was the highest Beyer rating of any two-year-old horse that went on to win the Derby. He then won the Preakness Stakes. In the Belmont Stakes, the third and final leg of the Triple Crown, Real Quiet lost when Victory Gallop beat him by a nose in the final stride of the race.

Before American Pharoah won the 2015 Triple Crown, no horse had come closer to taking the Triple Crown since Affirmed's victory in 1978. Kent Desormeaux was criticized for his jockeying in the Belmont Stakes. Many believed he moved out too fast at the start, causing Real Quiet to tire in the final strides of the course. For his performances in 1998, Real Quiet won the Eclipse Award for best three-year-old colt.

== Four-year-old season ==
As a four-year-old, Real Quiet won the Grade I Pimlico Special and the Grade I Hollywood Gold Cup. In the $600,000 Special, he was the second choice to Free House, who had won both of his Grade I starts coming into the race that year including the Santa Anita Handicap. They dueled down the home-stretch, with Gary Stevens driving Real Quiet forward and Chris McCarron trying to hold his thin lead aboard Free House. In the final strides, Real Quiet poked his nose in front to win one of the closest Specials ever. "I was afraid that Free House would get out front and steal it," Baffert said. "It looked as though Free House didn't want to give it up. But we were just lucky to get by him." Real Quiet ran the mile and three-sixteenths in 1:54 1/5, returned $5.80 for a $2 bet to win, and added $360,000 to a bankroll that passed $2.6 million.

He was the first horse in 50 years to win the Preakness Stakes and the Pimlico Special and is one of only five horses to accomplish that feat along with four Triple Crown winners: Citation, Whirlaway, Assault and War Admiral.

That summer, Real Quiet won the $1 million Grade I Hollywood Gold Cup, defeating Budroyale and Malek over ten furlongs in 1:59.67. He also placed third in the Grade II Massachusetts Handicap at Suffolk Downs, losing to Behrens and Running Stag. In addition, he finished second in the Grade III New Orleans Handicap and the Grade III Texas Mile Stakes. Real Quiet was considered to be a strong contender in the Breeders' Cup Classic and was entered in the Pacific Classic as a prep race. However, he was injured and unable to race for the rest of the year. He finished his four-year-old season as a millionaire with a record of 2–2–1 in five starts and annual earnings of $1,101,880.

== Retirement ==
As a 4-year-old, Real Quiet suffered a fractured splint bone in his right front leg. In his career, he hit the board in 17 of 20 starts and earned $3,271,802.

Real Quiet entered stud for a fee of $25,000 in 2000 at Vinery Kentucky near Lexington. George Hofmeister's Highland Farm had purchased the breeding rights to the horse the month before the Kentucky Derby. Hofmeister had bought majority interest in Vinery, owned by Ben P. Walden Jr. and his wife, Elaine.

Real Quiet later stood at Taylor Made Stallions in Kentucky and Pin Oak Lane Farm, then Penn Ridge, both in Pennsylvania. He also shuttled to Australia and Uruguay, taking advantage of the reversed breeding season observed in the southern hemisphere.

In 2005, he was relocated to Regal Heir Farms in Pennsylvania. He produced a prime runner in the Philippines named Real Spicy, who is owned by Hermie Esguerra. The horse was a strong contender for that country's own version of the 2005 Triple Crown Championship. Although Real Quiet's progeny have not been nearly as successful in the United States, he produced Pussycat Doll, who won the La Brea Stakes and the G1 Humana Distaff Handicap (defeating her stablemate Behaving Badly); No Place Like It, winner of the U.S.A Pine Oak Stakes; and Wonder Lady Ann L, winner of the 2006 Coaching Club American Oaks (G1) at Belmont Park. He also sired back-to-back Breeders' Cup Sprint winner Midnight Lute. Real Quiet died on September 27, 2010, from an injury he suffered after falling in his paddock at Penn Ridge Farms.

== Legacy ==
A street in unincorporated Prince William County, Virginia, intersecting a street named for fellow racehorse Sunday Silence, is named for him. However, it is misspelled as "Real Quite Ct."

== Pedigree ==
Pedigree of Real Quiet
Sire Quiet American bay 1986	Fappiano bay 1977	Mr. Prospector	Raise a Native
Sire Quiet American bay 1986	Fappiano bay 1977	Mr. Prospector	Gold Digger
Sire Quiet American bay 1986	Fappiano bay 1977	Killaloe	Dr. Fager
Sire Quiet American bay 1986	Fappiano bay 1977	Killaloe	Grand Splendor
Sire Quiet American bay 1986	Demure bay 1977	Dr. Fager	Rough'n Tumble
Sire Quiet American bay 1986	Demure bay 1977	Dr. Fager	Aspidistra
Sire Quiet American bay 1986	Demure bay 1977	Quiet Charm	Nearctic
Sire Quiet American bay 1986	Demure bay 1977	Quiet Charm	Cequillo
Dam Really Blue ch. 1983	Believe It ch. 1975	In Reality	Intentionally
Dam Really Blue ch. 1983	Believe It ch. 1975	In Reality	My Dear Girl
Dam Really Blue ch. 1983	Believe It ch. 1975	Breakfast Bell	Buckpasser
Dam Really Blue ch. 1983	Believe It ch. 1975	Breakfast Bell	Reveille
Dam Really Blue ch. 1983	Meadow Blue ch. 1975	Raise a Native	Native Dancer
Dam Really Blue ch. 1983	Meadow Blue ch. 1975	Raise a Native	Raise You
Dam Really Blue ch. 1983	Meadow Blue ch. 1975	Gay Hostess	Royal Charger
Dam Really Blue ch. 1983	Meadow Blue ch. 1975	Gay Hostess	Your Hostess

== See also ==
- List of racehorses
