= Victory Gallop =

Canadian-bred Thoroughbred racehorse

- Sire: Cryptoclearance
- Grandsire: Fappiano
- Dam: Victorious Lil
- Damsire: Vice Regent
- Sex: Stallion
- Foaled: May 30, 1995
- Country: Canada
- Colour: Bay
- Breeder: Tall Oaks Farm (Ivan Dalos)
- Owner: Prestonwood Farm
- Trainer: W. Elliott Walden
- Record: 17: 9-5-1
- Earnings: $3,505,895

Major wins
- Rebel Stakes (1998); Arkansas Derby (1998); Stephen Foster Handicap (1999); Whitney Handicap (1999) Triple Crown wins Belmont Stakes (1998)

Awards
- American Champion Older Male Horse (1999)

Honours
- Canadian Horse Racing Hall of Fame (2010)
- Last updated on May 22, 2010

Victory Gallop (foaled May 30, 1995, in Ontario, Canada) is a Canadian-bred Thoroughbred racehorse who won the 1998 Belmont Stakes to deny Real Quiet the Triple Crown, and was the 1999 Champion Older Dirt Male. Upon the death of 1997 Belmont Stakes winner Touch Gold on November 13, 2025, Victory Gallop became the oldest-living winner of the Belmont Stakes, as well as the last-surviving winner born in the 20th Century. He is six years older than the next-oldest winner Birdstone.

== Background ==
Bred by Ivan Dalos' Tall Oaks Farm, Victory Gallop was foaled later in the year than is common for most Northern Hemisphere Thoroughbreds. Sired by 1987 Florida Derby winner Cryptoclearance, who won 12 of 44 starts and earned $3,376,327 lifetime, he was out of the mare Victorious Lil. He was purchased by Prestonwood Farm of Versailles, Kentucky, owned by Houston, Texas oilmen Jack, Art, and J. R. Preston, who also owned and raced two-time Breeders' Cup Mile winner Da Hoss.

== Racing career ==
Racing at age two, Victory Gallop won two ungraded stakes races and was second in the important Laurel Futurity. The following year, in the lead-up to the American Classic Races for three-year-olds, he won the Rebel Stakes, then beat Favorite Trick in the Arkansas Derby. In the Kentucky Derby, he was running last behind fourteen other horses at the half mile pole, then made a powerful drive near the end of the homestretch to pass betting favorite Indian Charlie but ran out of track and finished second to winner Real Quiet. In the Preakness Stakes, he finished second again to Real Quiet, then won the longer Belmont Stakes by a few inches. From there, Victory Gallop finished second behind Coronado's Quest in the Haskell Invitational Handicap and the Travers Stakes.

Racing in 1999 at age four, Victory Gallop recorded his best year. In the spring, he traveled to Nad Al Sheba Racecourse in Dubai, where he finished third to Shadwell Racing 's Almutawakel in the 1999 Dubai World Cup. Back in the United States, he won the Stephen Foster and Whitney Handicaps. In August 1999, Victory Gallop "retired at the pinnacle of his career with a torn ligament in his left foreleg...[Victory Gallop] probably tore the suspensory ligament in his left foreleg near the finish line of his stirring duel with Behrens in the Whitney Handicap at Saratoga."

== Stud career ==
Retired to stand at stud at his owner's Prestonwood Farm, Victory Gallop ranked second among 2003's freshman sires. Through November 2006, he had sired sixteen individual stakes race winners.

In 2008, Victory Gallop was sold to The Jockey Club of Turkey.

== Honors and awards ==
Victory Gallop's performances won him the 1999 Eclipse Award for Outstanding Older Male Horse. In a poll published by the New York Times' About, Inc., he was the top vote getter for Most Impressive Performance of the Year for his win in the Stephen Foster Handicap.

Victory Gallop was inducted in the Canadian Horse Racing Hall of Fame in 2010.

== Pedigree ==
Pedigree of Victory Gallop (CAN), bay stallion, 1995
Sire Cryptoclearance (USA) 1984	Fappiano (USA); 1977	Mr Prospector	Raise A Native
Sire Cryptoclearance (USA) 1984	Fappiano (USA); 1977	Mr Prospector	Gold Digger
Sire Cryptoclearance (USA) 1984	Fappiano (USA); 1977	Killaloe	Dr Fager
Sire Cryptoclearance (USA) 1984	Fappiano (USA); 1977	Killaloe	Grand Splendor
Sire Cryptoclearance (USA) 1984	Naval Orange (USA); 1975	Hoist The Flag	Tom Rolfe
Sire Cryptoclearance (USA) 1984	Naval Orange (USA); 1975	Hoist The Flag	Wavy Navy
Sire Cryptoclearance (USA) 1984	Naval Orange (USA); 1975	Mock Orange	Dedicate
Sire Cryptoclearance (USA) 1984	Naval Orange (USA); 1975	Mock Orange	Alablue
Dam Victorious Lil (CAN) 1989	Vice Regent (CAN); 1967	Northern Dancer	Nearctic
Dam Victorious Lil (CAN) 1989	Vice Regent (CAN); 1967	Northern Dancer	Natalma
Dam Victorious Lil (CAN) 1989	Vice Regent (CAN); 1967	Victoria Regina	Menetrier
Dam Victorious Lil (CAN) 1989	Vice Regent (CAN); 1967	Victoria Regina	Victoriana
Dam Victorious Lil (CAN) 1989	Glass House (USA); 1979	Halo	Hail To Reason
Dam Victorious Lil (CAN) 1989	Glass House (USA); 1979	Halo	Cosmah
Dam Victorious Lil (CAN) 1989	Glass House (USA); 1979	Glass Collector	First Landing
Dam Victorious Lil (CAN) 1989	Glass House (USA); 1979	Glass Collector	Masked Kiss (Family: 12-b)
