= List of Umamusume: Pretty Derby characters =

The Japanese multimedia franchise Umamusume: Pretty Derby, created by Cygames, centers around the titular Umamusume (ウマ娘; horse girls), kemonomimi who replace horses in the series' fictional universe and compete in organized races as both racers and idols. The vast majority of Umamusume featured in the franchise are named after Japanese racehorses, with their names, designs, and characterization inspired by their real-life equivalents' careers and personalities. As of November 2026, there are 136 playable Umamusume in the Umamusume Pretty Derby mobile game, many of whom also appear in the anime and manga series, alongside numerous additional Umamusume and human characters who appear throughout the franchise.

The franchise depicts Umamusume as all-female cursorial humans with the physical traits and characteristics of horses, including horse tails, horse ears, increased strength, high metabolisms, and the ability to run as fast as 70 km/h (43 mph). Each Umamusume wears a ribbon or other accessory on one ear (or wears a hat that tilts toward one ear) that indicates their real-life namesake's gender; to the viewer's right (proper left ear) indicates it was a mare, while to the viewer's left (proper right ear) indicates it was a stallion. (Note: Fine Motion (voiced by Chinami Hashimoto) is the only Umamusume to have accessories in both ears referencing a real life condition and she identifies as a mare.)

== Anime characters ==
=== Umamusume: Pretty Derby ===
The following are main characters primarily from all three seasons of the Umamusume: Pretty Derby anime.

Horse name	Cast	Appearances	Description
Special Week (スペシャルウィーク, Supesharu Wīku)	Voiced by: Azumi Waki	Starting Gate!, Umayon, anime series (1st-3rd), BNW OVA, video game, Umayuru, Uma Musumeshi, Road to the Top, PisuPisu☆SupiSupi Golshi-chan, Beginning of a New Era (cameo)	The protagonist of Starting Gate!, the main anime's first season and the final chapter of Part 1 of the video game's main story, who is a young Umamusume raised in Hokkaido; she never met another Umamusume until she enrolled in Tracen. Her birth mother died shortly after she was born, and she was raised by her human mother to be the best Umamusume in Japan. She admires Silence Suzuka and strives to be like her. She has great stamina and speed, and she has an instinct on the track as to when to hold back and when to open up. Special Week also has a gluttonous appetite that extends to assuming that others love food as much as she does.
Silence Suzuka (サイレンススズカ, Sairensu Suzuka)	Voiced by: Marika Kōno	Starting Gate!, Umayon, anime series (1st-3rd), BNW OVA, video game, Umayuru, Uma Musumeshi, Beginning of a New Era (cameo)	The co-protagonist of the main anime's first season and the protagonist of Chapter 5 of Part 1 of the video game's main story. Silence Suzuka is an accomplished Umamusume and Special Week's roommate and teammate. Her racing, performance, and friendship inspire Special Week. Her goal is to run, as fast and as far as possible, ahead of any peers or challengers, and she believes that is what it means to be the best Umamusume. Later on in the anime, she goes to the United States.
Tokai Teio (トウカイテイオー, Tōkai Teiō)	Voiced by: Machico	Starting Gate!, Umayon, anime series (1st-3rd), BNW OVA, Cinderella Gray, video game, Umayuru, Uma Musumeshi, Road to the Top, PisuPisu☆SupiSupi Golshi-chan, Beginning of a New Era (cameo)	The protagonist of the anime's second season. Tokai Teio is a talented Umamusume on Team Spica who has a strong admiration for the Student Council President, Symboli Rudolf, and wishes to one day be as good as her. She becomes Mejiro McQueen's rival but suffers from repeated injuries.
Vodka (ウオッカ, Uokka)	Voiced by: Ayaka Ōhashi	Starting Gate!, Umayon, anime series (1st-3rd), BNW OVA, video game, Umayuru, Uma Musumeshi	A junior of Special Week and is one of the first three members to join Team Spica with her friend and rival Daiwa Scarlet and Gold Ship.
Daiwa Scarlet (ダイワスカーレット, Daiwa Sukāretto)	Voiced by: Chisa Kimura	Starting Gate!, Umayon, anime series (1st-3rd), BNW OVA, video game, Umayuru, Uma Musumeshi, Beginning of a New Era	A junior of Special Week who is Vodka's close friend and main rival. She first appeared in the anime in the first season, as a member of Team Spica.
Gold Ship (ゴールドシップ, Gōrudo Shippu)	Voiced by: Hitomi Ueda	Starting Gate!, Umayon, anime series (1st-3rd), BNW OVA, video game, Umayuru, Uma Musumeshi, PisuPisu☆SupiSupi Golshi-chan, Umayuru: Pretty Gray	The protagonist of PisuPisu☆SupiSupi Golshi-chan and is depicted as the owner of PAKA TUBE!, the official series YouTube channel. She is a mischievous, eccentric, and capricious Umamusume who is fond of playing pranks, especially on Mejiro McQueen, but she displays as a very skilled racer if the opportunity is presented. She first appeared in the anime in the first season, as a member of Team Spica.
Mejiro McQueen (メジロマックイーン, Mejiro Makkuīn)	Voiced by: Saori Ōnishi	Haru Urara, Do Your Best!, Starting Gate!, Umayon, anime series (1st-3rd), BNW OVA, Cinderella Gray, video game, Umayuru, Uma Musumeshi, PisuPisu☆SupiSupi Golshi-chan, Beginning of a New Era (cameo), Umayuru: Pretty Gray	The co-protagonist of the anime's second season and the protagonist for Chapter 1 of Part 1 of the video game's main story. She is a member of the prestigious Mejiro family. In the anime, she reluctantly joins Team Spica but later forms a close friendship with Tokai Teio. She may initially seem cold and blunt, but she actually cares for others and is willing to help them when needed.
Kitasan Black (キタサンブラック, Kitasan Burakku)	Voiced by: Hinaki Yano	Anime series (2nd-3rd), video game, Umayuru (cameo), Uma Musumeshi, Beginning of a New Era	The protagonist of the anime's third season. First appearing in the anime's second season, she is an Umamusume who is a fan of Tokai Teio and enrolls in Tracen to follow her footsteps. She shares a room with her childhood friend and rival Satono Diamond. In the third season, she joins Team Spica.
Trainer (トレーナー, Torēnā)	Voiced by: Kōji Okino	Anime series (1st-3rd), BNW OVA	Founder and trainer of Team Spica. He is known for his tendency to scout an Umamusume by examining their legs, only to be immediately kicked in the face. Despite his unorthodox tactics, he shows care for his team members, often listening to their struggles and assisting them wherever possible.
Hana Tōjō (東条ハナ, Tōjō Hana)	Voiced by: Megumi Toyoguchi	Anime series (1st-3rd), BNW OVA	Founder and trainer of Team Rigil, which is the main rival of Team Spica in the first season.
Symboli Rudolf (シンボリルドルフ, Shinbori Rudorufu)	Voiced by: Azusa Tadokoro	Haru Urara, Do Your Best!, Starting Gate!, Umayon, anime series (1st-3rd), BNW OVA, Cinderella Gray, video game, Umayuru, Uma Musumeshi, Star Blossom, Road to the Top, Beginning of a New Era (cameo)	The student council president of Tracen, who is a recipient of the prestigious Triple Crown. She first appeared in the anime's first season, as a member of Team Rigil.
Air Groove (エアグルーヴ, Ea Gurūvu)	Voiced by: Ruriko Aoki	Starting Gate!, Umayon, anime series (1st-3rd), BNW OVA, video game, Umayuru, Uma Musumeshi, Star Blossom, Beginning of a New Era (cameo)	The student council vice president of Tracen alongside Narita Brian. She is a close friend and rival of Silence Suzuka. She also takes good care of her childhood friend Duramente. She first appeared in the anime's first season, as a member of Team Rigil.
Hishi Amazon (ヒシアマゾン)	Voiced by: Yuiko Tatsumi	Starting Gate!, Umayon, anime series (1st-3rd), video game, Uma Musumeshi, Star Blossom, Beginning of a New Era (cameo)	The leader of the Miho dormitory. She is particular about face-off. She first appeared in the anime's first season, as a member of Team Rigil.
Grass Wonder (グラスワンダー, Gurasu Wandā)	Voiced by: Rena Maeda	Starting Gate!, Umayon, anime series (1st-3rd), video game, Umayuru, Uma Musumeshi, Beginning of a New Era (cameo)	An Umamusume hailing from the United States who is one of Special Week's friends. Initially unable to race following an injury, she recovers and proves herself as a formidable and skill racer. She first appeared in the anime's first season, as a member of Team Rigil.
El Condor Pasa (エルコンドルパサー, Eru Kondoru Pasā)	Voiced by: Minami Takahashi	Starting Gate!, Umayon, anime series (1st-3rd), video game, Umayuru, Uma Musumeshi, Beginning of a New Era (cameo)	An Umamusume hailing from the United States who received training abroad and aspires to compete in foreign races. She is one of Special Week's friends and views her as a rival. She first appeared in the anime's first season, as a member of Team Rigil. Her personality dramatically shifts whether she is wearing her luchador mask or not; with her mask on she is confident, passionate and energetic, while she is highly timid and meek with it off.
Maruzensky (マルゼンスキー, Maruzensukī)	Voiced by: Lynn	Haru Urara, Do Your Best!, Starting Gate!, Umayon, anime series (1st-3rd), Cinderella Gray, video game, Umayuru, Uma Musumeshi, Beginning of a New Era (cameo)	One of Symboli Rudolf's friends who is a caring senior to younger Umamusume, while also viewed as an esteemed racer. She first appeared in the anime in the first season, as a member of Team Rigil. A running gag in the franchise centers around her age and affinity for 1990s culture due to being based on one of the oldest horses added, as well as being out of touch with contemporary trends.
Taiki Shuttle (タイキシャトル, Taiki Shatoru)	Voiced by: Yuka Ōtsubo	Haru Urara, Do Your Best!, Umayon, anime series (1st-3rd), video game, Umayuru (cameo), Beginning of a New Era (cameo)	An Umamusume hailing from the United States who excels in mile races. She first appeared in the anime in the first season, as a member of Team Rigil.
Daring Tact (デアリングタクト, Dearingu Takuto)	Voiced by: Hina Yōmiya	Anime series (3rd), video game	A young Umamusume and recipient of the Triple Tiara. She first appeared in the anime in the third season, as a member of Team Rigil.
Misato Akasaka (赤坂美聡, Akasaka Misato)	Voiced by: Satomi Akesaka	Anime series (1st-3rd), BNW OVA, Cinderella Gray, video game (voice only), Star Blossom	The main race commentator for the Twinkle Series races.
Junko Hosoe (細江純子, Hosoe Junko)	Voiced by: Junko Hosoe	Anime series (1st-2nd), BNW OVA, video game (voice only)	Color commentator alongside Misato Akasaka during the first two seasons. The real Junko Hosoe is a former jockey and real-life horse racing commentator.
Seiun Sky (セイウンスカイ, Seiun Sukai)	Voiced by: Akari Kitō	Starting Gate!, Umayon, anime series (1st-3rd), BNW OVA, video game, Uma Musumeshi, Star Blossom, Road to the Top, Beginning of a New Era (cameo), Umayuru: Pretty Gray	One of Special Week's friends who has a loose and relaxed personality, though is much more skilled than she appears. She first appeared in the anime's first season, where she exhibits her strength as a rival to Special Week.
King Halo (キングヘイロー, Kingu Heirō)	Voiced by: Iori Saeki	Umayon, anime series (1st-3rd), video game, Umayuru, Uma Musumeshi, Road to the Top, Beginning of a New Era (cameo), Umayuru: Pretty Gray	One of Special Week's friends, who races with pride even with middling results. She first appeared in the anime's first season, where she exhibits her strength as a rival to Special Week. In Part 2 of the game's main story, she is a main character and a member of Team Ascella.
Haru Urara (ハルウララ)	Voiced by: Yukina Shuto	Haru Urara, Do Your Best!, Starting Gate!, Umayon, anime series (1st-3rd), BNW OVA, video game, Road to the Top, Beginning of a New Era (cameo)	The protagonist for manga Haru Urara, Do Your Best!. A friendly Umamusume, she displays endless enthusiasm for racing despite never placing well, endearing her to her friends.
Matikanefukukitaru (マチカネフクキタル, Machikane Fukukitaru)	Voiced by: Hiyori Nitta	Umayon, anime series (1st-3rd), BNW OVA, video game, Umayuru, Uma Musumeshi, Road to the Top, Beginning of a New Era (cameo)	A friend and rival of Silence Suzuka who also has a knack for fortune telling, which she uses to forecast the futures of several Umamusume who seek her knowledge. She has low self-esteem and credits her victories to luck or divine influence, mainly from a god she refers to as the great Shiraoki.
Mejiro Ryan (メジロライアン, Mejiro Raian)	Voiced by: Afumi Hashi	Starting Gate!, Umayon, anime series (1st-3rd), Cinderella Gray, video game, Uma Musumeshi, Beginning of a New Era (cameo)	A member of the prestigious Mejiro family, who deeply cares for fellow members and juniors Mejiro Dober and Mejiro Bright. A tomboy in appearance and demeanor who loves weight training, she secretly loves romance manga and wants to try looking more feminine, but is too shy to admit it.
Mejiro Palmer (メジロパーマー, Mejiro Pāmā)	Voiced by: Yuri Noguchi	Cinderella Gray, Anime series (2nd-3rd), video game, Uma Musumeshi, Star Blossom, Beginning of a New Era (cameo)	An Umamusume of the prestigious Mejiro family whose friendliness and tact attitude makes her popular with others, but she suffers from an inferiority complex towards the rest of her family. She is best friends with Daitaku Helios, whose usage of slang confuses her but picks up on and uses herself regardless.
Mejiro Dober (メジロドーベル, Mejiro Dōberu)	Voiced by: Hikari Kubota	Starting Gate!, anime series (1st-3rd), video game, Uma Musumeshi, Beginning of a New Era (cameo)	A member of the prestigious Mejiro family who is Mejiro Bright's sister and respects her senior Mejiro Ryan, she is a socially anxious, closeted shōjo manga artist beneath her cool exterior. Uniquely, she is the only trainee in the game whose interactions with the player trainer differ depending on their chosen gender, displaying enthusiasm and friendliness towards female trainers while exhibiting extreme shyness and some androphobia towards male trainers.
Broye (ブロワイエ, Burowaie)	Voiced by: Haruna Ikezawa	Anime series (1st), BNW OVA	A French Umamusume who defeats El Condor Pasa at the Prix de l'Arc de Triomphe before traveling to Japan to compete at the Japan Cup, only to be defeated by Special Week. She is based on the Irish-bred French racehorse Montjeu.
Biwa Hayahide (ビワハヤヒデ)	Voiced by: Yui Kondo	Starting Gate!, Umayon, anime series (1st-3rd), BNW OVA, video game, Uma Musumeshi, Star Blossom, Beginning of a New Era (cameo), Umayuru: Pretty Gray	The older sister of Narita Brian and a member of Team BNW, consisting of her friends Narita Taishin and Winning Ticket. Though she gives off the appearance of a cool and intelligent student, she loves bananas and is unusually self-conscious about the size of her head.
Narita Taishin (ナリタタイシン)	Voiced by: Keiko Watanabe	Starting Gate!, Umayon, BNW OVA, anime series (2nd-3rd), video game, Umayuru, Uma Musumeshi, Star Blossom, Road to the Top, Beginning of a New Era (cameo), Umayuru: Pretty Gray	A member of Team BNW, consisting of her friends Biwa Hayahide and Winning Ticket. Self-conscious of her height and the prior subject of teasing, she begins racing to win and prove those who doubt her.
Winning Ticket (ウイニングチケット, Uiningu Chiketto)	Voiced by: Yui Watanabe	Starting Gate!, Umayon, anime series (1st-3rd), BNW OVA, video game, Umayuru, Star Blossom, Beginning of a New Era (cameo), Umayuru: Pretty Gray	The protagonist for Chapter 3 of Part 1 of the video game's main story, who is a member of Team BNW, consisting of her friends Biwa Hayahide and Narita Taishin. She has a straightforward personality and holds a deep admiration and desire to race in the Japanese Derby, though she is emotionally sensitive and prone to crying frequently.
Rice Shower (ライスシャワー, Raisu Shawā)	Voiced by: Manaka Iwami	Umayon (manga only), BNW OVA, anime series (2nd-3rd), video game, Uma Musumeshi, Star Blossom, Road to the Top, PisuPisu☆SupiSupi Golshi-chan, Beginning of a New Era (cameo)	The protagonist for Chapter 2 of Part 1 of the video game's main story. She has a gloomy personality and frequently belittles herself. She is a skilled racer who aspires to win, though her victories come at the cost of denying her peers to achieve major milestones.
Mihono Bourbon (ミホノブルボン, Mihono Burubon)	Voiced by: Ikumi Hasegawa	Umayon (manga only), BNW OVA, anime series (2nd-3rd), video game, Umayuru (cameo), Uma Musumeshi, Road to the Top, PisuPisu☆SupiSupi Golshi-chan, Beginning of a New Era (cameo)	A friend and rival of Rice Shower whose robotic behavior earned her the nickname "Cyborg". Ironically, electronic devices she comes in contact with have a tendency to break down, resulting in her being banned from using the vending machines on campus and forcing her family to live an analog lifestyle.
Kuronuma (黒沼)	Voiced by: Takaya Kuroda	Anime series (2nd-3rd)	He is a trainer for Mihono Bourbon. A tough-looking man called Master by Mihono Bourbon.
Minamisaka (南坂)	Voiced by: Makoto Furukawa	Anime series (2nd-3rd)	He is a trainer for Team Canopus. Although he appears kind, he is also able to take strong measures at Twin Turbo's request.
Nice Nature (ナイスネイチャ, Naisu Neicha)	Voiced by: Kaori Maeda	Starting Gate!, Umayon, anime series (1st-3rd), video game, Uma Musumeshi, Star Blossom, Beginning of a New Era (cameo)	A friend and rival of Tokai Teio, who strives to win even after several third-place finishes. She is a member of Team Canopus in the second season. As a result of her racing records, she is cynical and pessimistic and shies away from high expectations. Despite this, she serves as a close friend and mentor to Kitasan Black in the third season.
Twin Turbo (ツインターボ, Tsuin Tābo)	Voiced by: Miharu Hanai	Anime series (2nd-3rd), video game, Umayuru, Uma Musumeshi, Star Blossom	A friend of Tokai Teio, and although she does not perform well because she runs at full power at any distance, she unilaterally sees Tokai Teio as a rival. She is a member of Team Canopus in the second season.
Ikuno Dictus (イクノディクタス, Ikuno Dikutasu)	Voiced by: Masumi Tazawa	Anime series (2nd-3rd), video game, Umayuru, Uma Musumeshi, Beginning of a New Era (cameo)	A friend and rival of Mejiro McQueen, who races analytically and is careful to not get injured. She is a member of Team Canopus in the second season.
Matikanetannhauser (マチカネタンホイザ, Machikane Tanhoiza)	Voiced by: Hikaru Tono	Anime series (2nd-3rd), video game, Umayuru, Uma Musumeshi, Star Blossom, Beginning of a New Era (cameo)	A rival of Rice Shower who is unlucky and often suffers injuries and nosebleeds, though she endears herself to her teammates. She is a member of Team Canopus in the second season.
Sounds of Earth (サウンズオブアース, Saunzu Obu Āsu)	Voiced by: Makiko	Anime series (3rd), video game	A friend and rival of Kitasan Black, who is flamboyant and artistic though she proves herself as a skilled racer. She is a member of Team Canopus in the third season.
Royce and Royce (ロイスアンドロイス, Roisu Ando Roisu)	Voiced by: Rui Tanabe	Anime series (3rd), video game, Uma Musumeshi, Star Blossom, Beginning of a New Era (cameo)	A member of Team Canopus in the third season, often seen supporting her fellow teammates.
Satono Diamond (サトノダイヤモンド, Satono Daiyamondo)	Voiced by: Hina Tachibana	Anime series (2nd-3rd), video game, Uma Musumeshi, Beginning of a New Era (cameo)	The co-protagonist for the anime's third season. First appearing in the anime's second season, she is an Umamusume who is a fan of Mejiro McQueen and enrolls in Tracen to follow her footsteps. She is childhood friends with Kitasan Black, who she engages in a friendly rivalry. She is also a member of the prestigious Satono family, and aspires to break her family's curse of never winning a Grade 1 race by becoming an acclaimed racer herself.
Satono Crown (サトノクラウン, Satono Kuraun)	Voiced by: Sayumi Suzushiro	Video game, anime series (special-3rd), Uma Musumeshi, Beginning of a New Era (cameo)	A friend and rival of Kitasan Black, who is a relative of Satono Diamond and a member of the Satono family.
Duramente (ドゥラメンテ, Duramente)	Voiced by: Akina	Video game, anime series (3rd), Uma Musumeshi	A rival of Kitasan Black, who won the Satsuki Shō and Japanese Derby. Initially not acknowledging Kitasan Black's skill as a racer, she eventually comes to respect it and befriend her.
Cheval Grand (シュヴァルグラン, Shuvaru Guran)	Voiced by: Yūko Natsuyoshi	Video game, anime series (special-3rd), Uma Musumeshi, Beginning of a New Era (cameo)	The middle child of the three V Sisters who is suffers from insecurity and lack of self-esteem when compared to her sisters Verxina and Vivlos and their achievements, as well as one of Kitasan Black's friends and rivals. She is highly withdrawn and struggles when speaking to others, but harbors talents not seen in either of her sisters.
Verxina (ヴィルシーナ, Virushīna)	Voiced by: Kaya Okuno	Video game, anime series (3rd), Uma Musumeshi	The eldest of the three V Sisters who seeks the "queen's throne", but feels overshadowed by others, particularly her arch-rival Gentildonna. While she gets annoyed or angered at the mere mention of the word "second", she is nonetheless determined to overcome her rival.
Vivlos (ヴィブロス, Viburosu)	Voiced by: Ayasa Itō	Video game, anime series (3rd), Uma Musumeshi	The youngest of the three V Sisters who lived her life spoiled and pampered by her family's wealth. She is a highly impish and flirtatious Umamusume whose goal is to live in and race in Dubai.

=== Road to the Top ===
The following are main characters primarily from the original net animation (ONA) Road to the Top. They also appear as secondary characters in Beginning of a New Era.

Horse name	Cast	Appearances	Description
Narita Top Road (ナリタトップロード, Narita Toppu Rōdo)	Voiced by: Kanna Nakamura	Uma Musumeshi, Road to the Top, Beginning of a New Era	The protagonist of Road to the Top. She is a class president, and a friend and rival of Admire Vega and T. M. Opera O. She aspires to win at the Triple Crown races with the help of her trainer Okita.
T. M. Opera O (テイエムオペラオー, Tei Emu Opera Ō)	Voiced by: Sora Tokui	Haru Urara, Do Your Best!, Starting Gate!, Umayon, anime series (1st-3rd), BNW OVA, Cinderella Gray (cameo), video game, Umayuru, Road to the Top, Beginning of a New Era	A friend and rival of Narita Top Road, Admire Vega, and Meisho Doto. She is theatrical and flamboyant, but she backs up her attitude with an overwhelming dominance in races, causing her to be referred as the "Conqueror of the Century's End". She would later return in Beginning of a New Era as the overarching antagonist and goal Jungle Pocket aims to surpass.
Admire Vega (アドマイヤベガ, Adomaiya Bega)	Voiced by: Hitomi Sasaki	BNW OVA, Uma Musumeshi, Road to the Top, Beginning of a New Era	A friend and rival of Narita Top Road and T. M. Opera O generation, who is trying to uphold the wishes of her stillborn twin sister by winning races.
Meisho Doto (メイショウドトウ, Meishō Dotō)	Voiced by: Misaki Watada	Umayon (manga only), anime series (1st-3rd), video game, Uma Musumeshi, Road to the Top, Beginning of a New Era	A close friend and rival of T. M. Opera O. She is clumsy and has low self-esteem, which are offset by her persistence to keep trying and change for the better.
Curren Chan (カレンチャン, Karen Chan)	Voiced by: Yū Sasahara	Starting Gate!, Umayon, anime series (3rd), video game, Uma Musumeshi, Road to the Top, Beginning of a New Era, Umayuru: Pretty Gray	The roommate and close friend of Admire Vega, who is a social media influencer pursuing "cuteness".
Okita (沖田)	Voiced by: Hiroshi Tsuchida	Road to the Top, Beginning of a New Era	He is the trainer of Narita Top Road. He was introduced to Narita Top Road by her father when she was a child.
Nana Izumimoto (泉本奈々, Izumimoto Nana)	Voiced by: Rina Honnizumi	Road to the Top, Beginning of a New Era	She is a race commentator in Road to the Top and Beginning of a New Era, replacing Misato Akasaka's role in the main anime and Cinderella Gray.
Yamamoto (山本)	Voiced by: Masahiro Yamamoto	Road to the Top, anime series (3rd), Beginning of a New Era	Color commentator alongside Misato Akasaka or Nana Izumimoto during Road to the Top, the third season, and Beginning of a New Era. He is a fictional version of former Chunichi Dragons pitcher Masahiro "Masa" Yamamoto.

=== Beginning of a New Era ===
The following are main characters primarily from the animated film Beginning of a New Era.

Horse name	Cast	Appearances	Description
Jungle Pocket (ジャングルポケット, Janguru Poketto)	Voiced by: Yuri Fujimoto	Video game, Uma Musumeshi, PisuPisu☆SupiSupi Golshi-chan, Beginning of a New Era	The protagonist of Beginning of a New Era. She is a friend and rival of Agnes Tachyon, Manhattan Cafe, and Dantsu Flame who enrolled in Tracen after seeing Fuji Kiseki race. She aspires to be the best Umamusume by besting the strongest of her generation, especially Agnes Tachyon and T. M. Opera O.
Agnes Tachyon (アグネスタキオン, Agunesu Takion)	Voiced by: Sumire Uesaka	Starting Gate!, Umayon, anime series (3rd), video game, Umayuru, Uma Musumeshi, Road to the Top, Beginning of a New Era	The co-protagonist of Beginning of a New Era. A friend and rival of Manhattan Cafe, Jungle Pocket, and Dantsu Flame who is an eccentric scientist focusing on Umamusume research. She displays unbridled skill during races as she bests her generation's racers, only to go on an early hiatus following an injury.
Manhattan Cafe (マンハッタンカフェ, Manhattan Kafe)	Voiced by: Yui Ogura	Umayon, BNW OVA, anime series (3rd), video game, Uma Musumeshi, Road to the Top, Beginning of a New Era	A friend and rival of Agnes Tachyon, Jungle Pocket, and Dantsu Flame who has an unseen ghost "friend" that she aims to surpass. Although mostly annoyed by Agnes Tachyon's antics, she reluctantly assists her in her endeavors.
Dantsu Flame (ダンツフレーム, Dantsu Furēmu)	Voiced by: Haruna Fukushima	Video game, Uma Musumeshi, Beginning of a New Era	A friend and rival of Agnes Tachyon, Jungle Pocket, and Manhattan Cafe who aims to reach the dominating level of skill of her peers and perseveres despite the overwhelming odds.
Fuji Kiseki (フジキセキ)	Voiced by: Eriko Matsui	Starting Gate!, Umayon, anime series (1st-3rd), BNW OVA, video game, Star Blossom, Beginning of a New Era	The leader of Rittō dormitory who is Jungle Pocket's friend and teammate under the trainer Tanabe. She is also a skilled racer who dominated her races, though she retired following an injury. She first appeared in the anime in the first season, as a member of Team Rigil.
Tanabe (タナベ)	Voiced by: Kenichi Ogata	Beginning of a New Era	He is the trainer of the team that Fuji Kiseki and Jungle Pocket belong to. After Fuji Kiseki retired, he quit being a trainer, but Fuji Kiseki introduced him to Jungle Pocket, and he returned to being a trainer.

== Manga characters ==
=== Cinderella Gray ===
The following are main characters primarily from the manga Cinderella Gray and its anime adaptation.

Horse name	Cast	Appearances	Description
Oguri Cap (オグリキャップ, Oguri Kyappu)	Voiced by: Tomoyo Takayanagi	Haru Urara, Do Your Best!, Starting Gate!, Umayon, anime series (1st-3rd), BNW OVA, Cinderella Gray, video game, Umayuru, Uma Musumeshi, Road to the Top, PisuPisu☆SupiSupi Golshi-chan, Beginning of a New Era (cameo), Umayuru: Pretty Gray	The protagonist of Cinderella Gray. She is an Umamusume who transfers from the regional racing scene in Kasamatsu to the national Twinkle Series and faces against the strongest of her generation, such as Tamamo Cross, Super Creek, and Inari One. Born with weak legs but nonetheless persevered, she gained the nickname "Gray Monster" for her powerful running abilities, but outside the racetrack she is socially awkward, literal-minded, and has an unusually voracious appetite, being frequently responsible for emptying cafeterias of their food. In the main story of the video game, she was a former member of Team Sirius and left the team when she retired.
Belno Light (ベルノライト, Beruno Raito)	Voiced by: Miyari Nemoto (web comic), Momoko Seto	Cinderella Gray	A student at Kasamatsu Tracen Academy who becomes Oguri Cap's best friend and joins her in Tokyo. While not as physically capable as other Umamusume, she uses her knowledge in sports science to assist Oguri Cap in her races. After Oguri Cap retires, she becomes a trainer herself. Belno Light is based on the racehorse Twin Bee (ツインビー, Tsuin Bī), who spent her entire career in Kasamatsu and won 10 out of 45 races. She is also inspired by Masau Minowa (三輪 勝, Minowa Masaru), a farrier who shoed Oguri Cap during the racehorse's career.
Jo Kitahara (北原穣, Kitahara Jō)	Voiced by: Shogo Nakamura (web comic), Katsuyuki Konishi (anime)	Cinderella Gray	A trainer at Kasamatsu Tracen Academy who scouts Oguri Cap and takes her and Belno Light under his wing. He is based on three people: Kōichi Oguri (the original owner of the real Oguri Cap), Katsumi Ando (Oguri Cap's jockey), and Masao Sugi (Oguri Cap's trainer in Kasamatsu).
Ginjirō Musaka (六平銀次郎, Musaka Ginjirō)	Voiced by: Hōchū Ōtsuka	Cinderella Gray	An elderly national trainer who is the mentor and uncle of Kitahara. Often nicknamed "Roppei" (六平（ろっぺい), he temporarily takes over as Oguri Cap's trainer upon her transfer from Kasamatsu to Tokyo. Musaka is based on Isō Sahashi, who took over the ownership of the real Oguri Cap as part of the racehorse's transfer from regional to the JRA nationals.
Fujimasa March (フジマサマーチ, Fujimasa Māchi)	Voiced by: Mariya Ise	Cinderella Gray	The top Umamusume student in Kasamatsu who becomes Oguri Cap's first rival. Following two defeats from Oguri Cap, Fujimasa March befriends her and respects her strength. She is based on the racehorse March Tosho (マーチトウショウ, Māchi Tōshō), who beat the real Oguri Cap in two out of seven races in 1987 and 1988. March Tosho continued to compete mainly on dirt tracks in Kochi until 1992.
Norn Ace (ノルンエース, Norunu Ēsu)	Voiced by: Ayano Shibuya	Cinderella Gray	A red-haired Umamusume student in Kasamatsu, who is part of a trio that initially bullied Oguri Cap. She eventually comes to respect and befriend Oguri Cap after seeing her overwhelming strength, and lends her assistance to teach her on Winning Concert performances.
Rudy Lemono (ルディレモーノ, Rudi Remōno)	Voiced by: Mai Nishikawa (web comic), Yō Taichi	Cinderella Gray	A blond-haired Umamusume student in Kasamatsu, who is part of a trio that initially bullied Oguri Cap but eventually befriended her.
Mini the Lady (ミニーザレディ, Minī za Redi)	Voiced by: Shiori Izawa	Cinderella Gray	A black-haired Umamusume student in Kasamatsu, who is part of a trio that initially bullied Oguri Cap but eventually befriended her.
Tamamo Cross (タマモクロス, Tamamo Kurosu)	Voiced by: Naomi Ōzora	Umayon, anime series (1st-3rd), Cinderella Gray, video game, Uma Musumeshi, PisuPisu☆SupiSupi Golshi-chan, Beginning of a New Era (cameo), Umayuru: Pretty Gray	A close friend of Oguri Cap who becomes her first major rival upon transferring to the Twinkle Series. She displays dominance within her generation of racers and is referred as the "White Lightning", becoming Oguri Cap's goal to surpass. Due to her impoverished background, she is highly frugal and takes every opportunity she can to save money, as well as having a lighter food intake than her peers. As part of a running gag, Super Creek treats her like a child and often pampers her due to her small stature and despite her protests.
Sakura Chiyono O (サクラチヨノオー, Sakura Chiyono Ō)	Voiced by: Ruriko Noguchi	Cinderella Gray, video game, Uma Musumeshi, Star Blossom, Beginning of a New Era (cameo)	A friend and rival of Mejiro Ardan and Yaeno Muteki and the protégé of Maruzensky who manages to win the Japanese Derby, only to be debilitated by an injury following the race. In Star Blossom, she is Sakura Laurel's teammate in Team Alkes and childhood friend alongside Sakura Bakushin O.
Mejiro Ardan (メジロアルダン, Mejiro Arudan)	Voiced by: Saya Aizawa	Cinderella Gray, video game, Uma Musumeshi, Star Blossom, Beginning of a New Era (cameo)	A friend and rival of Sakura Chiyono O and Yaeno Muteki who is a member of the prestigious Mejiro family, being the younger sister of Mejiro Ramonu. While she has a weak constitution and spends most of her time being hospitalized, she is highly skilled and aspires to be a legendary racer in spite of her illness.
Yaeno Muteki (ヤエノムテキ)	Voiced by: Ayumi Hinohara	Cinderella Gray, video game, Uma Musumeshi, Road to the Top, Beginning of a New Era (cameo)	A friend and rival of Sakura Chiyono O and Mejiro Ardan, who faces off against much of Oguri Cap's generation.
Super Creek (スーパークリーク, Sūpā Kurīku)	Voiced by: Kana Yūki	Umayon, anime series (1st-3rd), BNW OVA, Cinderella Gray, video game, Uma Musumeshi, Beginning of a New Era (cameo)	An Umamusume who is grouped with her friends and rivals Oguri Cap and Inari One as "The Three Strongest Eternals". Super Creek comes from a family of daycare workers and developed a maternal nature as a result. She enjoys coddling smaller Umamusume, particularly her roommate Narita Taishin and Tamamo Cross as well as her trainer Fumino Nase, but she often does so at her own expense to the point of exhaustion.
Dicta Striker (ディクタストライカ, Dikuta Sutoraika)	Voiced by: Yumiri Hanamori	Cinderella Gray	A classmate of Oguri Cap who desires to challenge and defeat Oguri at the track. She is based on the racehorse Soccer Boy (サッカーボーイ, Sakkā Bōi), who won six races in his 11-race career from 1987 to 1988. Dicta Striker is named after the French racehorse Dictus, Soccer Boy's sire.
Blacky Ale (ブラッキーエール, Burakī Ēru)	Voiced by: Nanako Mori	Cinderella Gray	A delinquent Umamusume who is Oguri Cap's classmate. She challenges Oguri Cap to a race, hoping to beat her and force her out of Tracen Academy, only to be humbled by Oguri Cap's strength. Blacky Ale is based on the racehorse Rugger Black (ラガーブラック, Ragā burakku).
Meikun Tsukasa (メイクンツカサ)	Voiced by: Mayuko Kazama	Cinderella Gray	Three students in Tokyo training under Musaka. They are assigned to partner running with Oguri Cap shortly after she enters Tracen Academy.
Kraft Univer (クラフトユニヴァ, Kurafuto Yuniva)	Voiced by: Takako Tanaka	Cinderella Gray	Three students in Tokyo training under Musaka. They are assigned to partner running with Oguri Cap shortly after she enters Tracen Academy.
God Hannibal (ゴッドハンニバル, Goddo Hanibaru)	Voiced by: Michiko Kaiden	Cinderella Gray	Three students in Tokyo training under Musaka. They are assigned to partner running with Oguri Cap shortly after she enters Tracen Academy.
Katsumi Komiyama (小宮山勝美, Komiyama Katsumi)	Voiced by: Ryoko Shiraishi	Cinderella Gray	Tamamo Cross' trainer, whom she has been supporting after Tamamo Cross' elderly trainer transferred his duties onto Komiyama.
Fumino Nase (奈瀬文乃, Nase Fumino)	Voiced by: Yū Shimamura	Cinderella Gray	Super Creek's trainer. A second-generation Umamusume trainer, Fumino is known as a prodigy due to the high success rate of her training style. Her trainee's maternal personality often embarrasses her during interviews.
Sensuke Fujii (藤井泉助, Fujii Sensuke)	Voiced by: Daisuke Takahashi	Cinderella Gray	A sports journalist who discovers Oguri Cap and sensationalizes her struggles of entering the Classics to muster support and direct attention.
Gold City (ゴールドシチー, Gōrudo Shichī)	Voiced by: Saki Kosaka	Umayon, BNW OVA, anime series (2nd), Cinderella Gray, video game, Uma Musumeshi, PisuPisu☆SupiSupi Golshi-chan, Beginning of a New Era (cameo)	An Umamusume who works as a hairdresser and model alongside being a skilled racer.
Sirius Symboli (シリウスシンボリ, Shiriusu Shinbori)	Voiced by: Fairouz Ai	Video game, Cinderella Gray, Umayuru, anime series (3rd), Uma Musumeshi, Star Blossom	A former childhood friend of Symboli Rudolf, who returns to Japan to race in the Twinkle Series after a tour in Europe. She first appeared in the anime in the third season, she was listed in the documents as one of the contenders for the Prix de l'Arc de Triomphe.
Akitsu Teio (アキツテイオー, Akitsu Teiō)	Voiced by: Nagisa Kujime	Cinderella Gray	An Umamusume who excels in mile-long tracks and is known for breaking speed records as a front runner, but is defeated by Tamamo Cross at the Takarazuka Kinen. She is based on the racehorse Nippo Teio (ニッポーテイオー, Nippo Teiō), who won eight races in his 21-race career from 1985 to 1988.
Obey Your Master (オベイユアマスター, Obei Yua Masutā)	Voiced by: Shizuka Ishigami	Cinderella Gray	An American Umamusume who competes at the Japan Cup after having no luck in the American circuit. She additionally conceals her original personality and skill level, which she unleashes to win the Japan Cup against Tamamo Cross. She is based on the American racehorse Pay the Butler, who won the 1988 Japan Cup.
Toni Bianca (トニビアンカ, Toni Bianka)	Voiced by: Yūko Kaida	Cinderella Gray	An accomplished Italian Umamusume who competes at the Japan Cup. She is based on the Irish-bred Italian racehorse Tony Bin.
Moonlight Lunacy (ムーンライトルナシー, Mūnraito Runashī)	Voiced by: Akira Sekine	Cinderella Gray	A British Umamusume who competes at the Japan Cup. She is based on the British racehorse Moon Madness.
Michelle My Baby (ミシェルマイベイビー, Misheru Mai Beibī)	Voiced by: Ayahi Takagaki	Cinderella Gray	An American Umamusume who competes at the Japan Cup. She is based on the American racehorse My Big Boy, who won 10 races in his 49-race career.
Ellerslie Pride (エラズリープライド, Erazurī Puraido)	Voiced by: Miyu Tomita	Cinderella Gray	A New Zealand Umamusume who competes at the Japan Cup. She is based on the New Zealand racehorse Bonecrusher and is named after Ellerslie Racecourse, where a bronze statue of Bonecrusher has a plaque that reads: "Bonecrusher: The Pride of Ellerslie".
Yamano Thousand (ヤマノサウザン, Yamano Sauzan)	Voiced by: Mutsumi Tamura	Cinderella Gray	An Umamusume student in Kasamatsu who defeats Fujimasa March at the Tokai Derby. Unlike the rest of the Kasamatsu community, she completely despises Oguri Cap and blames her for causing March to lose her competitive edge. March, however, proves her wrong by defeating her at the Gifu Okan Sho. Yamano Thousand is based on the racehorses Fujino Northern (フジノノーザン, Fujino Nōzan) (who won the 1988 Tokai Derby) and Tokai Shark (トウカイシャーク, Tōkai Shāku) (who had a rivalry with March Tosho in 1988).
Inari One (イナリワン, Inari Wan)	Voiced by: Haruno Inoue	Umayon, anime series (1st-3rd), BNW OVA, Cinderella Gray, video game, Uma Musumeshi, Beginning of a New Era (cameo)	An Umamusume who is grouped with her friends and rivals Oguri Cap and Super Creek as "The Three Strongest Eternals". Similar to Oguri Cap, she transfers to the Twinkle Series after racing regionally.
Bamboo Memory (バンブーメモリー, Banbū Memorī)	Voiced by: Kotomi Aihara	Umayon (manga only), Cinderella Gray, video game, Uma Musumeshi, Beginning of a New Era (cameo)	A friend and rival of Oguri Cap who is part of Tracen's disciplinary committee and wishes to challenge Oguri Cap in races.
Mejiro Ramonu (メジロラモーヌ, Mejiro Ramōnu)	Voiced by: Nao Tōyama	Cinderella Gray, video game, Uma Musumeshi, Beginning of a New Era (cameo)	The older sister of Mejiro Ardan and the first recipient of the Triple Tiara.

=== Star Blossom ===
The following are main characters primarily from the manga Star Blossom.

Horse name	Cast	Appearances	Description
Sakura Laurel (サクラローレル, Sakura Rōreru)	Voiced by: Mizuki Mano	Video game, anime series (3rd), Star Blossom	The protagonist of Star Blossom. She aspires to best Narita Brian in spite of her physical weakness and fragility. She is childhood friends and teammates with Sakura Bakushin O and Sakura Chiyono O in Team Alkes.
Narita Brian (ナリタブライアン, Narita Buraian)	Voiced by: Yūka Aisaka (season 1), Rika Kinugawa (season 2 onwards)	Haru Urara, Do Your Best!, Starting Gate!, Umayon, anime series (1st-3rd), BNW OVA, video game, Umayuru (cameo), Uma Musumeshi, Star Blossom, Road to the Top, Beginning of a New Era (cameo)	The protagonist for Chapter 4 of Part 1 of the video game's main story. She is the vice president of Tracen's student council alongside Air Groove and a recipient of the Triple Crown, who dominates her generation of racers. She is also Biwa Hayahide's younger sister and aspires to race against her, but also has a solitary nature and often rejects help from her peers. She first appeared in the anime in the first season, as a member of Team Rigil.
Mayano Top Gun (マヤノトップガン, Mayano Toppu Gan)	Voiced by: Mio Hoshitani	Starting Gate!, Umayon, BNW OVA, anime series (2nd-3rd), video game, Umayuru, Uma Musumeshi, Star Blossom, Beginning of a New Era (cameo)	A friend and rival of Sakura Laurel and Narita Brian, who is a rambunctious and energetic student who also wants to face off against Narita Brian.
Marvelous Sunday (マーベラスサンデー, Māberasu Sandē)	Voiced by: Marie Miyake	Starting Gate!, video game, Uma Musumeshi, Star Blossom	A friend and rival of Sakura Laurel and Narita Brian, who views everyday as being marvelous. She has fantastical yet unexplained powers, among them telepathy and bringing others into a pocket dimension she calls the "Marvelous Dimension".
Samson Big (サムソンビッグ, Samuson Biggu)	Voiced by: Miyari Nemoto	Video game, Star Blossom, Beginning of a New Era (cameo)	A rival of Narita Brian who challenges her in the Classic races, only to lose against her.
Sakura Bakushin O (サクラバクシンオー, Sakura Bakushin'ō)	Voiced by: Sachika Misawa	Starting Gate!, Umayon, BNW OVA, anime series (2nd-3rd), video game, Uma Musumeshi, Star Blossom, Road to the Top, Beginning of a New Era (cameo)	The headstrong class representative, childhood friend and teammate of Sakura Laurel and Sakura Chiyono O in Team Alkes who proves herself as one of the best sprinters in racing. She aspires to master all race lengths, but her overwhelming preference for speed and low stamina prevents her from running in anything longer than mile races.

== Stage play characters (Sprinters' Story) ==
The following are main characters primarily from the stage play Sprinters' Story.

Horse name	Cast	Appearances	Description
Daitaku Helios (ダイタクヘリオス, Daitaku Heriosu)	Voiced by: Aya Yamane	Anime series (2nd-3rd), video game, Umayuru, Sprinters' Story, Uma Musumeshi, Beginning of a New Era	She serves as the protagonist for stage play Sprinters' Story. She is of Mejiro McQueen's generation and is a close friend of Mejiro Palmer, who is of the same generation. She is also good at escaping. She has a crush on Daiichi Ruby and calls her "Lady", though all of her advances are repeatedly rejected. She is also a gyaru, and regularly speaks with gyaru slang (in the English release, she speaks with zoomer slang). She first appeared in the anime in the second season, she meets and becomes friends with Mejiro Palmer.
Yamanin Zephyr (ヤマニンゼファー, Yamanin Zefā)	Voiced by: Riona Imaizumi	Video game, Sprinters' Story, Uma Musumeshi, Star Blossom, Beginning of a New Era (cameo)	She is one of the sprint Umamusume of Tokai Teio's generation, and a rival of Nishino Flower. She first appeared in the anime in Beginning of a New Era as one of the previous Umamusume.
Daiichi Ruby (ダイイチルビー, Daiichi Rubī)	Voiced by: Karin Isobe	Video game, anime series (3rd), Sprinters' Story, Uma Musumeshi, Star Blossom, Beginning of a New Era	She is one of the sprint Umamusume of the Mejiro McQueen's generation. She comes from a brilliant family. She first appeared in the anime in the third season, she was watching Daitaku Helios and Mejiro Palmer's live performance at the school festival. Daitaku Helios has a one-sided crush on her, though she never reciprocates her feelings and repeatedly rejects her advances.
K.S.Miracle (ケイエスミラクル, Kei Esu Mirakuru)	Voiced by: Hinata Satō	Video game, Sprinters' Story, Uma Musumeshi, Beginning of a New Era (cameo)	She is one of the sprint Umamusume of Tokai Teio's generation. She was physically weak from a young age. She first appeared in the anime in Beginning of a New Era as one of the previous Umamusume.

== Video game characters ==
The following are notable characters primarily from the Umamusume: Pretty Derby game and Party Dash.

Horse name	Cast	Appearances	Description
Hishi Akebono (ヒシアケボノ, Hishi Akebono)	Voiced by: Rei Matsuzaki	BNW OVA, anime series (2nd-3rd), video game, Umayuru, Uma Musumeshi, Star Blossom, Beginning of a New Era (cameo)	A foreign exchange student chef who towers over her peers at 180 cm tall, making her the largest playable Umamusume in the game. She once aspired to be a sumo wrestler, but ultimately decided to compete in races in addition to pursuing a career as a chef. Like Oguri Cap and Special Week, she has a salient appetite, though her portions are considered large for smaller Umamusume such as her roommate Biko Pegasus.
Agnes Digital (アグネスデジタル, Agunesu Dejitaru)	Voiced by: Minori Suzuki	Starting Gate!, Umayon (manga only), video game, Umayuru, Uma Musumeshi, Road to the Top, Beginning of a New Era	A highly eccentric and perverted Umamusume otaku and the roommate of Agnes Tachyon, she is nonetheless a formidable opponent in racing due to her equal proficiency on both turf and dirt tracks in order to get closer to the Umamusume she admires. She believes herself to be a fan of other racers who is unworthy of speaking and interacting with others, but is an accomplished racer herself yet struggles with the idea of having her own fans.
Mejiro Bright (メジロブライト, Mejiro Buraito)	Voiced by: Ayaka Ōnishi	Video game, Uma Musumeshi, Beginning of a New Era (cameo), Umayuru: Pretty Gray	She is an Umamusume of the Silence Suzuka generation, and is on good terms with Mejiro Dober, who is the same generation as her in the Mejiro family. Compared to other Umamusume, she is very gentle. She first appeared in the anime in Beginning of a New Era as one of the previous Umamusume. In the video game Party Dash, she is a member of Team Freesia.
Aston Machan (アストンマーチャン, Aston Māchan)	Voiced by: Honoka Inoue	Video game, anime series (special-3rd), Uma Musumeshi, Beginning of a New Era	An Umamusume who carries a Ma-chan doll and likes to approach anyone holding a camera. In the anime, she randomly appears in scenes and looks toward the camera, while in the game, she tells the player to always remember her.
Tsurumaru Tsuyoshi (ツルマルツヨシ, Tsurumaru Tsuyoshi)	Voiced by: Yoshino Aoyama	Video game, Umayuru, Uma Musumeshi, Beginning of a New Era, Umayuru: Pretty Gray	An optimistic but sickly Umamusume and the sixth and final member of the Golden Generation to be added to the game. She strives to run the Triple Crown despite her weak constitution and legs that often leave her hospitalized as well as being prone to violent coughing fits. She is highly conscious about her health, often making smoothies to address her various illnesses.
Tanino Gimlet (タニノギムレット, Tanino Gimuretto)	Voiced by: Misato Matsuoka	Video game, Umayuru, Uma Musumeshi, Umayuru: Pretty Gray	An Umamusume who wears an eyepatch and has formidable speed and strength, as well as a rebellious personality that makes Vodka idolize her. Tanino Gimlet also has a habit of destroying fences.
Symboli Kris S (シンボリクリスエス, Shinbori Kurisuesu)	Voiced by: Meiku Harukawa	Video game, Umayuru, anime series (3rd), Beginning of a New Era	She is a taciturn and big Umamusume of the same generation as Tanino Gimlet. She is an Umamusume who came to study abroad from the USA and wants to give back to the Symboli family. She first appeared in the anime in Umayuru, she is one of the main characters and is often forced to face off against Tanino Gimlet.
Rhein Kraft (ラインクラフト, Rain Kurafuto)	Voiced by: Nanae Kojima	Video game, Uma Musumeshi	She serves as the protagonist for Chapter 1 and final chapter of Part 2 of the video game's main story. She is one generation younger Sweep Tosho and one generation older Kawakami Princess. She was impressed with King Halo and her new trainer, and became a part of Team Ascella alongside Cesario.
Cesario (シーザリオ, Shīzario)	Voiced by: Haruka Sato	Video game, Uma Musumeshi	She serves as the protagonist for Chapter 2 of Part 2 of the video game's main story. She is a rival of Rhein Kraft and is of the same generation. She was impressed with King Halo and her new trainer and became a part of Team Ascella alongside Rhein Kraft. She respects Special Week.
Gentildonna (ジェンティルドンナ, Jentirudonna)	Voiced by: Yū Serizawa	Video game, Uma Musumeshi, PisuPisu☆SupiSupi Golshi-chan	An aristocratic Umamusume daughter of a wealthy family part of the same generation as Gold Ship and Verxina, she lives on meritocratic ideals and invites challengers she deems worthy. She is also disproportionately physically strong compared to other Umamusume, being capable of feats such as effortlessly compressing a 12 cm steel ball into a 2 cm one.
Calstone Light O (カルストンライトオ, Karusuton Raito O)	Voiced by: Yumiko Mochizuki	Video game	An Umamusume whose straight-faced expressions conceal a bizarre obsession with speed and straight lines, which also extends into single-minded behavior and doing tasks as quickly as possible. As part of her obsession with straight lines, she is unable to comprehend "quadratic functions" such as curves and corners.
Still in Love (スティルインラブ, Sutiru in Rabu)	Voiced by: Saki Miyashita	Video game	A seemingly graceful and refined Umamusume with a sweet tooth, her outward appearance hides the yandere personality of a predator relishing in the hunt for her prey. Uniquely in her career mode, players are given the option to play with an increasingly red tint and a glitching and distorted user interface that intensifies as bloodlust gradually consumes her.
Stay Gold (ステイゴールド, Sutei Goorudo)	Voiced by: Satsumi Matsuda	Video game, PisuPisu☆SupiSupi Golshi-chan	The founder and president of Tracen Academy's Expeditionary Support Group and Gold Ship's largely-absent roommate. She, along with Neo Universe, is one of the only characters aware of the truth of the world and Umamusume, possessing the memories of the real-world Stay Gold and the ability to share the memories of racehorses that raced against him, driving her to manipulate events to ensure that their Umamusume counterparts live better lives. Prior to her formal introduction in the game in 2025, she was represented by Kin'iro Ryotei, a background character in the anime's adaptation's first season.
Forever Young (フォーエバーヤング, Fōebā Yangu)	Voiced by: Shuri Miyumi	Video game	An innovative Umamusume who boasts that she'll "revolutionize the world of Umamusume". Wielding traits like the vitality of a gyaru, logical thinking fostered by watching races and businesses from all around the world at a young age, and extraordinary creativity as her weapons, she's working toward her project day after day. Her birthday falls on the same day as a holiday in the game's setting, which coincidentally is also the day of its launch in Japan.
Tazuna Hayakawa (駿川たづな, Hayakawa Tazuna)	Voiced by: Yukiyo Fujii	Umayon, anime series (1st-3rd), Cinderella Gray, video game, Umayuru, Beginning of a New Era	Secretary to Tracen Academy Director Yayoi Akikawa. Whether she is a human or an Umamusume is officially left vague, though her character design and aspects of her personality are inspired by the Japanese racehorse Tokino Minoru.
Yayoi Akikawa (秋川やよい, Akikawa Yayoi)	Voiced by: Kaori Mizuhashi	Cinderella Gray, video game, anime series (special), Umayuru, Beginning of a New Era	The petite Director of Tracen Academy. She often speaks in archaic Japanese, carries a hand fan, and is often accompanied by a black cat on her hat. While she is not an Umamusume, her character design is inspired by the Canadian racehorse Northern Taste.
Aoi Kiryuin (桐生院葵, Kiryūin Aoi)	Voiced by: Miho Okasaki	Video game, Uma Musumeshi, Beginning of a New Era	Happy Meek's trainer. While she comes from a prestigious family of Umamusume trainers, she struggles to bring Happy Meek to her full potential.
Happy Meek (ハッピーミーク, Hapī Mīku)	Voiced by: Miyu Yoshizaki	Video game, Umayuru, Uma Musumeshi, Beginning of a New Era	A white-haired Umamusume who is an opponent in the final race of the URA Finals. She appears to be scatterbrained and absent-minded while not racing. Unlike other Umamusume, Happy Meek is not based on a real racehorse.
Riko Kashimoto (樫本理子, Kashimoto Riko)	Voiced by: Romi Park	Cinderella Gray, video game, Beginning of a New Era	A trainer who becomes Acting Director of Tracen Academy after Akikawa travels overseas on a business trip. To keep the trainees busy, Kashimoto initiates the Unity Cup (アオハル杯, Aoharu-hai), an intense team championship tournament where the player's team must face Kashimoto's Team Zenith (Team First (チームファースト, Chīmu Fāsuto) in the Japanese version). Despite her strict training methods, she struggles when exerting any physical activity herself.
Bitter Glasse (ビターグラッセ, Bitā Gurasse)	Voiced by: Aino Shimada	Video game, Beginning of a New Era	An Umamusume who is a member of Team Zenith. Bitter Glasse is highly energetic and is dedicated to her training; as a result, she is not really suited as a team member due to her self-focus. Like Happy Meek, she is an original character not based on a real racehorse.
Little Cocon (リトルココン, Ritoru Kokon)	Voiced by: Saho Shirasu	Video game, Beginning of a New Era	An Umamusume who is a member of Team Zenith. Little Cocon is foul-mouthed and hates compromise, which makes her a questionable team member. Like Bitter Glasse, she is an original character not based on a real racehorse.
Light Hello (ライトハロー, Raito Harō)	Voiced by: Kana Ueda	Video game	An Umamusume who leads the Grand Concert Reboot Project (Grand Live Reconstruction Project (グランドライブ再建計画, Gurando Raibu Saiken Keikaku) in the Japanese version) to revitalize the live concert aspect of Umamusume races. She later sets up the Ramen Jamboree (ラーメン・ジャンボリー, Rāmen Janborī) to give Umamusume a side job of cooking ramen. Light Hello's workaholic nature causes her to forget to perform basic functions such as eating, and when she does have the opportunity to take breaks she drinks alcohol while watching idol shows. She is rumored to be a former Tracen Academy student herself, and she is inspired by the racehorse Moonlight Rose (ムーンライトローズ, Mūnraito Rōzu), who was winless in 18 races from 1996 to 1997.
Etsuko Otonashi (乙名史悦子, Otonashi Etsuko)	Voiced by: Emiri Suyama	Video game, Umayuru, Beginning of a New Era	A reporter for the magazine Monthly Twinkle (月刊トゥインクル, Gekka Tuinkuru) who has extensive knowledge of the Umamusume racing world. Later in the game, she announces a new race series called the Twinkle Star Climax, which trainees must achieve certain goals to receive an invitation.
Sasami Anshinzawa (安心沢刺々美, Anshinzawa Sasami)	Voiced by: Kikuko Inoue	Video game, Umayuru	A masked doctor who specializes in acupuncture and randomly shows up at Tracen Academy's infirmary to entice an Umamusume into trying one of her performance-enhancing chakra treatments, which will either increase the player's statistics or catastrophically drop the mood and statistic levels. She uses bamboo needles, which were once used to cure arterial congestions on racehorses. The JRA banned the use of bamboo needles in 2022 when they were proven to have no medical benefits.
