= Kotomi Aihara =

Japanese voice actress

- 藍原 ことみ
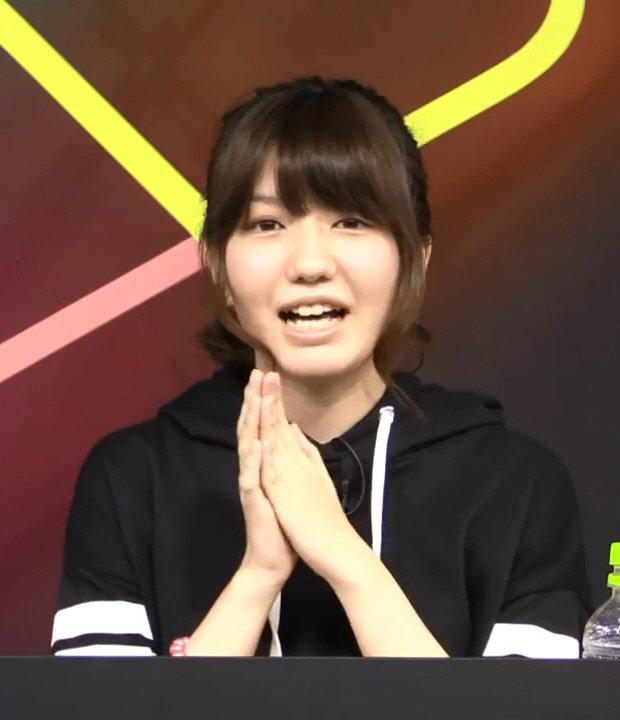
- Aihara in 2016
- Born: 2 May 1990 (age 36)
- Occupations: Voice actress; singer
- Years active: 2015–present
- Employer: Atomic Monkey
- Notable work: The Idolmaster Cinderella Girls as Shiki Ichinose; Umamusume: Pretty Derby as Bamboo Memory; Tasūketsu: Fate of the Majority as Bōrinmaru Gokokuhōtenji

Kotomi Aihara (藍原 ことみ, Aihara Kotomi; born 2 May 1990) is a Japanese voice actress and singer from Aomori Prefecture, affiliated with Atomic Monkey. She is known for voicing Shiki Ichinose in The Idolmaster Cinderella Girls, Bamboo Memory in Umamusume: Pretty Derby, and Bōrinmaru Gokokuhōtenji in Tasūketsu: Fate of the Majority.

== Biography ==
Kotomi Aihara, a native of Aomori Prefecture, was born on 2 May 1990. As a preteen, she watched Cardcaptor Sakura and Hunter x Hunter and wanted to be a "2D boy", so she gradually became interested in voice acting. This tendency had already existed in the previous few years, with her parents buying her a lot of goods associated with Sailor Uranus, a character she liked because of her voice (which was provided by Megumi Ogata). She was educated at the Atomic Monkey Voice Acting and Acting Institute, where she was taught by instructor Miki Nagasawa, and she also took part in the finals of the Seiyu Awards New Voice Actor Discovery Auditions and in the Koebu audition, winning the special prize at the latter.

Aihara voices Shiki Ichinose in The Idolmaster Cinderella Girls, a sub-franchise in The Idolmaster franchise. Since then, she has performed as a singer on several Idolmaster music releases, including "The Idolmaster Cinderella Master 038: Ichinose Shiki" (2015), which charted at #11 in the Oricon Singles Chart and the 2016 album The Idolmaster Cinderella Master Cute Jewelries! 003 (the series' first album to top the Oricon Albums Chart). She reprised her role in the anime adaptation The Idolmaster Cinderella Girls Theater.

She voices Bamboo Memory in Umamusume: Pretty Derby. In May 2024, it was announced that she would voice Bōrinmaru Gokokuhōtenji in Tasūketsu: Fate of the Majority.

She cites Shiho Niiyama as an influence.

She likes anison and is often interested in music by Megumi Hayashibara and Nana Mizuki, whose song "Scarlet Knight" she performed in her Seiyu Awards self-introduction. She likes horror and mystery games, having played Mystereet repeatedly, and she also plays the puzzle games Disney Tsum Tsum and Tetris. She is a fan of 1990s anime, with her favorites being Cardcaptor Sakura and Sailor Moon Sailor Stars.

== Filmography ==
=== Anime television series ===
Year	Work	Role	Ref.
2016	Beyblade Burst	Haruto Aota	
2017	Duel Masters	Planetta, Nagnagutulis, others	
2017	The Idolmaster Cinderella Girls Theater	Shiki Ichinose	
2018	Cardfight!! Vanguard	Maron	
2018	Legend of the Galactic Heroes: Die Neue These	Kircheis (childhood)	
2019	Fairy Gone	Child	
2019	Is It Wrong to Try to Pick Up Girls in a Dungeon?	Boy	
2020	A Certain Scientific Railgun	Boy	
2020	A3!	Audience	
2020	Ahiru no Sora	Momoharu Hanazono (childhood)	
2020	Mewkledreamy	Kanta Anzai	
2020	The Day I Became a God	Toshinori's child	
2021	2.43: Seiin High School Boys Volleyball Team	Kimichika Haijima (childhood)	
2021	Amaim Warrior at the Borderline	Takuma Fudo	
2021	Takt Op. Destiny	Takt Asahina (childhood)	
2022	Requiem of the Rose King	Young Gatesby	
2022	Smile of the Arsnotoria	Vellum	
2023	Ayakashi Triangle	Riita Kanade	
2024	Solo Leveling	Lina	
2024	Tasūketsu: Fate of the Majority	Bōrinmaru Gokokuhōtenji	
2025	Reborn as a Vending Machine, I Now Wander the Dungeon	Hulemy	
2026	Medalist 2nd Season	Riina Kojō	

=== Original net animation ===
Year	Work	Role	Ref.
2019	Gundam Build Divers Re:Rise	Stola	
2019	The Idolmaster Cinderella Girls 8th Anniversary Special Project: Spin-off!	Shiki Ichinose	
2019	The Disastrous Life of Saiki K.	Female student	

=== Video games ===
Year	Work	Role	Ref.
2015	The Idolmaster Cinderella Girls	Shiki Ichinose	
2017	Onigiri	Amanojaku	
2017	Quiz RPG: The World of Mystic Wiz	Lila G	
2019	Girls' Frontline	USAS-12, wz.29	
2019	Monster Strike	Mei, Sango	
2020	Sakura Kakumei	Rin Shiranui	
2021	Kirara Fantasia	Yuki Takahashi	
2021	Smile of the Arsnotoria	Vellum	
2022	Umamusume: Pretty Derby	Bamboo Memory	
2022	Arknights	Erato	
2025	Honkai: Star Rail	Young Phainon	
2026	Genshin Impact	Jeht	

== Discography ==
Title	Year	Single details	Peak chart positions		Sales
Title	Year	Single details	JPN	JPN Hot	Sales
"The Idolmaster Cinderella Master 038: Ichinose Shiki"	2015	Released: 18 November 2015; Label: Nippon Columbia	11	—	—
"—" denotes releases that did not chart or were not released in that region.
