= Mejiro Ramonu =

Japanese-bred Thoroughbred racehorse

Mejiro Ramonu メジロラモーヌ
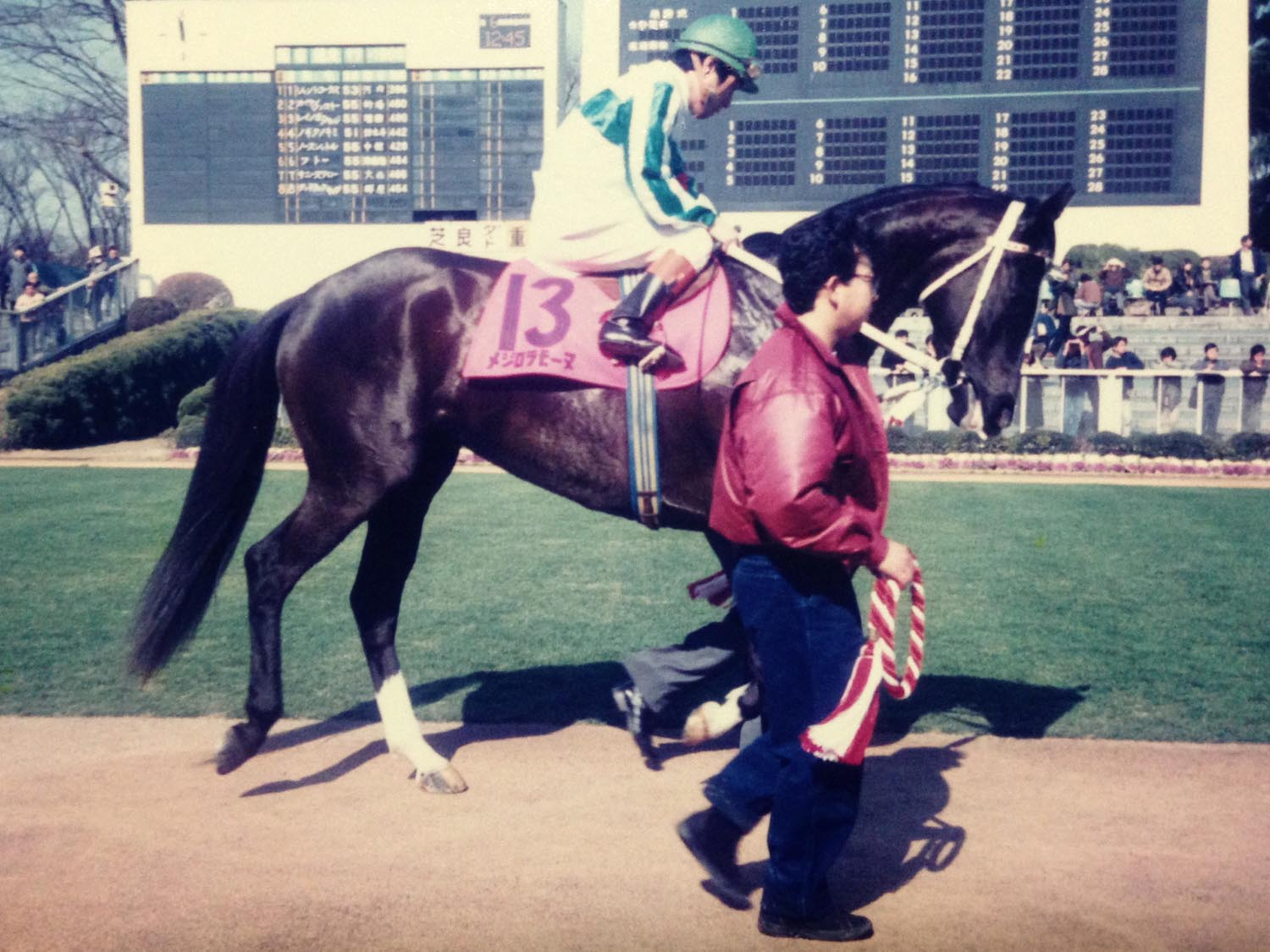
- Mejiro Ramonu at her retirement ceremony at Tokyo Racecourse.
- Breed: Thoroughbred
- Sire: Mogami (FR)
- Grandsire: Lyphard (USA)
- Dam: Mejiro Hiryu (JPN)
- Damsire: Never Beat (GB)
- Sex: Mare
- Foaled: April 9, 1983
- Died: September 22, 2005 (aged 22)
- Country: Japan
- Color: Brown
- Breeder: Mejiro Stud
- Owner: Mejiro Stud
- Racing colors
- Trainer: Shinji Okuhira
- Jockey: Hiroshi Kawachi
- Record: 12:9-0-0
- Earnings: ¥311,920,100

Major wins
- TV Tokyo Sho Sansai Himba Stakes (1985); Yonsai Himba Tokubetsu (West) (1986); Yonsai Himba Tokubetsu (East) (1986); Rose Stakes (1986); Japanese Classic Tiara Race wins: Oka Sho (1986); Yushun Himba (1986); Queen Elizabeth II Cup (1986)

Awards
- 1st Japanese Triple Tiara Champion (1986); Yushunsho Saiyushu 3-sai Himba (1985); Yushunsho Saiyushu 4-sai Himba (1986)

Honors
- Japan Racing Association Hall of Fame (1987)

Mejiro Ramonu (Japanese: メジロラモーヌ, Hepburn: Mejiro Ramōnu; April 9, 1983 – September 22, 2005) was a Japanese Thoroughbred racehorse and broodmare who became the first filly to win the Japanese Triple Tiara in 1986.

== Background ==
Mejiro Ramonu was foaled in 1983 at the Mejiro Stud in Date, Hokkaido. Her sire, Mogami was a new stallion co-owned by the Mejiro Group and the Symboli Farm. Her dam, Mejiro Hiryu, won six races in her career and is the half sister to Mejiro Eagle, winner of the 1978 Kyoto Shimbun Hai. When she was a foal, she had issues in her hock, and had a quiet personality, leading to the people around her not expecting much. She became the first Mejiro horse to be trained by Shinji Okuhira, after no other trainer would take her and another filly in.

After being raised at the Mejiro Stud, her hock issues gradually resolved as she became a two year old. In July 1985, she was officially given the name Mejiro Ramonu, and was moved to Hakodate Racecourse. The name is based on the Aiguille de l'Amone in the French Alps added to the Mejiro kanmei (eponym). When Okuhira first saw the horse, he didn't see the horse as one that stood out. However, her groom Kozo Kojima saw that she had a large abdomen, suggesting that she possessed a high level of cardiorespiratory function. As she was trained at Hakodate she showed great potential, and was later moved to Miho Training Center in Ibaraki Prefecture that fall.

== Racing career ==
=== 1985: Two-year-old season ===
Mejiro Ramonu ran her first race on October 13, 1985, at a maiden race covering a dirt track of 1400 meters at Tokyo Racecourse with Futoshi Kojima as her jockey, of which she won handily.

She was then entered in to her first graded race, the Keisei Hai Sansai Stakes held on November 3. She was anticipated to race against the then-undefeated Dyna Actress, but she was scratched beforehand. On the day of the race she was the most favored to win, surpassing even Daishin Fubuki, who was a colt. However, she became agitated soon after the start after bumping into another horse, and lost momentum, finishing fourth in a five-way race.

After the race, she briefly suffered from colic and periostitis, but soon recovered. She soon returned to racing, with her being entered into an allowance race that she won with a one length lead. Two weeks later, she won her first graded race in the TV Tokyo Sho Sansai Himba Stakes. Her time, 1:34.9, was seldom heard of at the time, as the only other two year olds in Japan in history at the time that managed to run a mile in less than 1:35 were her, Maruzensky, and Colonel Lancer.

=== 1986: Three-year-old season ===
Mejiro Ramonu started her three-year season with the Queen Cup, where she was the most favored to win. However, she was acting anxious from before the race, and finished fourth. After the race, her jockey, Masatsugu Kashiwazaki, remarked that he didn't really understood why she'd lose. The Mejiro matriarch, Miya Kitano, however, suspected the horse would lose the race based on the way the horse acted.

After this, she was moved to the Kansai region and entered into the Hochi Hai Yonsai Himba Tokubetsu, a trial race to the Oka Sho. Hiroshi Kawachi, who was a jockey based in Kansai, took over the duty of jockey, as it was planned that a Kansai jockey (i.e. Kawachi) would take the helm if Ramonu were to run in a race held in the Kansai region. During the race she was placed in the back of the pack, but at the third corner she was blocked by another horse that was losing momentum, and was almost at the back of the pack as the horse entered the final stretch. However, the horse managed to catch up at the last second, beating Chuo Sally by a neck.

At the Oka Sho, she was once again the most favored to win, with the parimutuel odds set at 1.6. She showed signs of anxiety at the race, but managed to place herself in the middle of the pack and pushed herself up to take the lead, before winning the first leg of the Triple Tiara with a 1 and 3/4 length lead against second place Mayano Jo O. This marked the first classic race victory for the Mejiro Stud, and the first Oka Sho victory for Kawachi.

After returning to Miho, she was planned to run in the second leg of the Triple Tiara, the Yushun Himba (Japanese Oaks), but there were concerns as to whether she could win a race at Tokyo due to both of her previous losses being at that racecourse. As such, it was decided that she would first be entered in to the SanSpo Sho Yonsai Hinba Tokubetsu, an Oaks trial race. This race served as the first race where she faced off Dyna Actress (who did not enter the Oka Sho), but ultimately Ramonu passed her on the final stretch and beat her.

At the Yushun Himba, she stumbled at the start and was forced to race from behind. However, she gradually pushed up forward as she ran along the railings, before taking the lead on the final stretch, winning the race with a 2 and a half length lead against Yu Miroku. She became the first horse since Titania in 1976 to win two of the Triple Tiara.

After winning the Yushun Himba, she was sent to the Mejiro Farm to recuperate, before restarting training at Hakodate Racecourse in August, with the intent to starting the Autumn season with the Queen Stakes before contesting the final leg of the Triple Tiara, the Queen Elizabeth II Cup (Q.E.II Cup) (at the time the Shuka Sho was yet to be formed). However, she was unable to handle the summer heat, and as a result she was sent back to Miho before given bloodletting treatment. She also showed signs of lameness during training, and as a result her restarting of training was pushed back even further. On October, she was sent to Kansai directly from Hakodate, where she would start her autumn season with the Rose Stakes. At the race, she was in the front of the pack, and attempted to take the lead on the stretch, but struggled to do so as she went neck-to-neck with Pot Tesco Lady. After the race, Kawachi suggested that the turf condition was to blame for why she struggled to win.

Okuhira recalled that, on the day of the Q.E.II Cup, Mejiro Ramonu "was at 70%". She was by far the most favored to win that day, with many anticipating that she would become the first Triple Tiara winner in history. At the race, she was among the 3rd pack in the race, but took the lead as the race entered the downhill on the 3rd corner at around the 800 meter mark. She held on to the lead as she and the other horses entered the final stretch, but she briefly slowed down and was almost overtaken by Super Shot. However, she managed to hold on to the lead by a neck, making her the first winner of the Triple Tiara since its introduction in the JRA races. She also became the biggest earning filly at the time, with her earnings surpassing 300 million yen. She also held the most consecutive graded race win at the time, having won 6 graded races in a row.

After the race, some wanted her to enter the Japan Cup, but as she was already planned to be retired after the Arima Kinen, Miya Kitano formally announced that she would head straight to Arima and retire after that race. She was entered in to the race after earning the third most votes of that race after Miho Shinzan and Sakura Yutaka O, but finished at 9th place behind Dyna Gulliver.

After retirement, she was awarded the Saiyushu Yonsai Himba title the following January. Despite some anticipating that she would be named Horse of the Year, the first for a filly since Tomei in 1971, the award ultimately went to Dyna Gulliver, who won the Tokyo Yushun the year before and defeated Ramonu at the Arima. Regarding this, columnist Keijiro Okawa claimed that he asked the JRA if they could get both horses named Horse of the Year, or at least have either one awarded the JRA Special Awards, only for them to reject both suggestions.

A retirement ceremony was held at Tokyo Racecourse on February 8, 1987, where she appeared wearing the race bib from her Q.E.II Cup. That same year, she was inducted in to the JRA Hall of Fame alongside Symboli Rudolf.

== Breeding career ==
Following retirement, she became a broodmare at the Mejiro Stud. However, throughout her breeding career, she was never able to produce any crops that matched her, with none of her crops winning any major titles. From her mare line, Field Rouge won the Kawasaki Kinen in 2008, Kosoku Straight won the Falcon Stakes in 2017, and Glory Vase won the Hong Kong Vase in 2019.

Mejiro Ramonu died at the Mejiro Farm on September 22, 2005, at the age of 22 due to old age. Her grave is erected inside the properties of the Mejiro Stud, currently the Lake Villa Farm.

=== Offspring ===
The list of offspring is based on information available on JBIS Search and the Kyosoba no Furusato Annaijo.

Year of Birth	Name	Sex	Color	Sire
1989	Mejiro Ryumon	Colt	Bay	Mejiro Titan
1990	Mejiro Rivera	Filly	Dark Bay	Symboli Rudolf
1992	Mejiro Teno	Gelding	Bay	Real Shadai
1994	Mejiro Desire	Colt	Brown	Sunday Silence
1996	Mejiro Monju	Colt	Dark Bay	Lindo Shaver
1997	Mejiro Brett	Colt	Bay	Timber Country
1998	Mejiro Flax	Filly	Bay	Lammtarra
1999	Mejiro Greene	Colt	Bay	Mejiro Ryan
2000	Mejiro Beckham	Colt	Brown	Brian's Time
2002	Mejiro Snow Shoe	Filly	Brown	El Condor Pasa
2003	Mejiro Rubato	Filly	Bay	Mejiro Ryan
2004	Mejiro Rastaban	Colt	Dark Bay	Tanino Gimlet

== In popular culture ==
An anthropomorphized version of Mejiro Ramonu appears as a character in the Japanese multimedia franchise Umamusume: Pretty Derby, voiced by Nao Tōyama. She is depicted as an elegant, dark-haired noblewoman with the most prestigious accomplishments of any racer of the Mejiro family, making her a role model for her juniors, especially Mejiro Ardan, her younger sister. However, she also has an obsessive, single-minded devotion to racing, and often attempts to provoke or otherwise psychologically manipulate her opponents to give herself better competition.

== Racing form ==
The following racing form is based on the racing form available on JBIS Search and netkeiba.

Date	Track	Race	Grade	Finish	Distance (Condition)	Time	Winning (Losing) Margin	Jockey	Winner (Runner-up)	Weight
1985 – three-year-old season (Note: Old Japanese horse age notation where a newly born foal is aged one. This was changed in 2001 to align with the international standards.)
Oct 13	Tokyo	3YO Maiden Race		1st	1,400 m (Firm)	1:26.1	21 lengths	Futoshi Kojima	(Dyna Bonder)	466
Nov 3	Tokyo	Keisei Hai Sansai Stakes	2	4th	1,400 m (Firm)	1:23.9	(4 lengths)	Futoshi Kojima	Daishin Fubuki	466
Nov 30	Nakayama	Kangiku Sho	Allowance	1st	1,600 m (Firm)	1:35.7	1 1/4 lengths	Masatsugu Kashiwazaki	(Fujino Sengoku)	456
Dec 14	Nakayama	TV Tokyo Sho Sansai Himba Stakes	3	1st	1,600 m (Firm)	1:34.9	3 1/2 lengths	Masatsugu Kashiwazaki	(Dyna Fairy)	458
1986 – four-year-old season
Jan 26	Tokyo	Queen Cup	3	4th	1,600 m (Firm)	1:36.5	(6 lengths)	Masatsugu Kashiwazaki	Super Shot	458
Mar 16	Hanshin	Yonsai Himba Tokubetsu (West)	2	1st	1,400 m (Good)	1:23.9	neck	Hiroshi Kawachi	(Chuo Sally)	452
Apr 6	Hanshin	Oka Sho	1	1st	1,600 m (Firm)	1:35.8	1 3/4 lengths	Hiroshi Kawachi	(Mayano Jo O)	454
Apr 27	Tokyo	Yonsai Himba Tokubetsu (East)	2	1st	1,800 m (Good)	1.50.8	1 1/2 lengths	Hiroshi Kawachi	(Dyna Actress)	450
May 18	Tokyo	Yushun Himba	1	1st	2,400 m (Firm)	2:29.6	2 1/2 lengths	Hiroshi Kawachi	(Yu Miroku)	456
Oct 12	Kyoto	Rose Stakes	2	1st	2,000 m (Firm)	2:01.3	neck	Hiroshi Kawachi	(Pot Tesco Lady)	462
Nov 2	Kyoto	Queen Elizabeth II Cup	1	1st	2,400 m (Firm)	2:29.1	1/2 length	Hiroshi Kawachi	(Super Shot)	464
Dec 21	Nakayama	Arima Kinen	1	9th	2,500 m (Good)	2:34.6	(4 lengths)	Hiroshi Kawachi	Dyna Gulliver	466

Legend:
Turf Dirt

== Pedigree ==
Pedigree of Mejiro Ramonu
Sire Mogami 1976 br.	Lyphard; 1969 b.	Northern Dancer	Nearctic
Sire Mogami 1976 br.	Lyphard; 1969 b.	Northern Dancer	Natalma
Sire Mogami 1976 br.	Lyphard; 1969 b.	Goofed	Court Martial
Sire Mogami 1976 br.	Lyphard; 1969 b.	Goofed	Barra
Sire Mogami 1976 br.	No Luck; 1968 dk.b.	Lucky Debonair	Vertex
Sire Mogami 1976 br.	No Luck; 1968 dk.b.	Lucky Debonair	Fresh as Fresh
Sire Mogami 1976 br.	No Luck; 1968 dk.b.	No Teasing	Palestinian
Sire Mogami 1976 br.	No Luck; 1968 dk.b.	No Teasing	No Fidding
Dam Mejiro Hiryu 1972 b.	Never Beat; 1960 d.ch.	Never Say Die	Nasrullah
Dam Mejiro Hiryu 1972 b.	Never Beat; 1960 d.ch.	Never Say Die	Singing Grass
Dam Mejiro Hiryu 1972 b.	Never Beat; 1960 d.ch.	Bride Elect	Big Game
Dam Mejiro Hiryu 1972 b.	Never Beat; 1960 d.ch.	Bride Elect	Netherton Maid
Dam Mejiro Hiryu 1972 b.	Amazon Warrior; 1960 b.	Khaled	Hyperion
Dam Mejiro Hiryu 1972 b.	Amazon Warrior; 1960 b.	Khaled	Eclair
Dam Mejiro Hiryu 1972 b.	Amazon Warrior; 1960 b.	War Betsy	War Relic
Dam Mejiro Hiryu 1972 b.	Amazon Warrior; 1960 b.	War Betsy	Betsy Ross (Family: 9-f)
