= Sakura Chiyono O =

Japanese thoroughbred racehorse

Sakura Chiyono O サクラチヨノオー
- Sakura Chiyono O racing at the 1988 Tokyo Yushun.
- Breed: Thoroughbred
- Sire: Maruzensky
- Grandsire: Nijinsky
- Dam: Sakura Sedan
- Damsire: Sedan
- Sex: Stallion
- Foaled: February 19, 1985
- Died: January 7, 2012 (aged 26)
- Country: Japan
- Color: Bay
- Breeder: Tanioka Farm Ltd.
- Owner: Sakura Commerce Co., Ltd.
- Racing colors
- Trainer: Katsutaro Sakai
- Jockey: Futoshi Kojima
- Record: 10: 5-1-1
- Earnings: 215,329,000 yen

Major wins
- Asahi Hai Sansai Stakes (1987); Yayoi Sho (1988); Japanese Classic Race wins: Tokyo Yushun (1988)

Sakura Chiyono O (Japanese: サクラチヨノオー, Hepburn: Sakura Chiyono Ō; 19 February 1985 – 7 January 2012) was a Japanese Thoroughbred racehorse and stud, foaled on February 19, 1985 in Hokkaido, Japan. He was bred by Tanioka Stud and owned by Sakura Commerce Co. Ltd..

In 1987, as a 2-year-old, he won the Asahi Hai Sansai Stakes at Nakayama. He also won the Japanese Derby in 1988. He was the last Derby winner of the Showa era.

== Background ==
Sakura Chiyono O was foaled by Sakura Sedan, who was the 1976 winner of the Nakayama Himba Stakes. His sire was Maruzensky, the undefeated hall of famer who won all 8 of his starts. Maruzensky himself was sired by Nijinsky, the latest English triple crown winner.

Sakura Chiyono O was the result of consistent breeding between both Maruzensky and Sakura Sedan. One of his older sibling, Sakura Toko, won the Tanabata Sho in 1986 . Unlike him, Sakura Chiyono O was born without a curved leg; which the breeders noted that meant the foal would be suitable for longer distance races. The name given, Sakura Chiyono O, was a combination of the "Sakura" crown name and "Chiyono" after the Yokozuna Chiyonofuji Mitsugu.

== Racing Career ==
=== 1987: two-year-old season ===
(Note: Prior to Japan's revision of the way it counts horse ages to match the international standard in 2001, newborns used to be considered 1 year old, thus there is a one-year difference in the names of certain races.)

Sakura Chiyono O made his debut on a 1000 meter turf maiden race at Hakodate. He was the favourite, running mostly in second place and sprinting to first at the final straight, winning by three and a half lengths. The crowd shouted loudly after his first win. After a brief rest, he returned at the Fuyo Tokubetsu. He started from the middle of the pack and caught up with the leaders around the third corner, before taking the lead in the final straight, finishing two and a half lengths ahead on his second consecutive win. He was then entered in to the Icho Tokubetsu, where he finished second with a two and half lengths from the winner due to the ground being soft due to heavy rain.

In a good form, Sakura Chiyono O ran in the Asahi Hai Sansai Stakes. This race was originally scheduled for December 6 but was postponed twice to December 20 due to heavy snowfall in the Kantō region. After securing a good start, Sakura Chiyono O was neck and neck with Tsujino Shogun at the second corner. The two horses remained side by side until the straightaway. Sakura Chiyono O, on the inside, was whipped five times to the shoulder, then attacked Tsujino Shogun on the outside with a series of left whip strikes. He managed to gain advantage on the uphill and finished first in front of Tsujino Shogun by a neck. This win marked a father-son victory on the same race as his sire won the race back in 1976.

=== 1988: three-year-old season ===
For the new season, the team decided to run the horse in the Kyodo News Hai Yonsai Stakes, which would be his first race in two months. During the race, he ran alongside mostly with Muguet Royal but lost pace near the end as Mogami Funny and Mogami Nine surpassed him, ultimately finishing in fourth place. His trainer Sakai attributed this loss towards a lack of intense training.

The team then imposed a stricter training as the preparation for his next race, the Yayoi Sho. The main competitor for him this time was Soccer Boy, the winner of last year's Hanshin Sansai Stakes and also the reigning winner of the best three year old colt, beating him, thus creating the notion of "The showdown between the champions of the East and West." The race turned one sided as Sakura Chiyono O managed to get a good start, lead from starting to finish and won by two lengths to the nearest horse, Tosho Mario.

As he won the Yayoi Sho, he was automatically qualified to race in the first classic race, the Satsuki Shō. Two of the horse's previous competitors, Soccer Boy and Muguet Royal, pulled out due to accidents which happened during their training. As usual, Sakura Chiyono O started well and sped up intensely onto the uphill but soon started to lose grounds in the final straight before both Yaeno Muteki and Dictar Land overtook him, ultimately finishing third.

The team then looked forward for the next race which was the Tokyo Yushun. With Sakura Chiyono O's loss at the Satsuki Shō, and the withdrawal of Soccer Boy, journalists did not put a clear favourite for this race. In the race, he started from bracket number 2 with horse number 5. Advance More, who was in the far outside, made a bold breakaway but Sakura Chiyono O's jockey, Kojima, let him pass for the second place, with a seven or eight lengths gap between them through the first corner. Advance More then started to lose momentum as several other horses including Sakura Chiyono O took over. Between the third and fourth corner on the hill, Sakura Chiyono O overtook Yaeno Muteki and Kokusai Triple for the lead. At the final straight, Mejiro Ardan surged from behind to take the lead but Chiyono O regained the lead at the finish line, winning the race by a neck. In the process, Sakura Chiyono O set a new record of 2 minutes 26.3 seconds for the race, 0.2 seconds faster than the previous record which was set by Bamboo Atlas in 1982.

After winning the Derby, Sakura Chiyono O suffered a flexor tendonitis injury on his right leg which forced him to sit out the rest of the season.

=== 1989: four-year-old season ===
Sakura Chiyono O return to racing in 1989 but lost both the Yasuda Kinen and Takarazuka Kinen. In the latter race, his old injury flared up again, leading to the team deciding to retire him from racing. His retirement ceremony being was held at Sapporo Racecourse on June 25 that year.

== Racing form ==
The data available is based on JBIS and Netkeiba.

Date	Track	Name	Grade	Distance (Condition)	Entry	HN	Odds (Favored)	Finish	Time	Margins	Jockey	Winner (2nd place)
1987 – three-year-old season
Aug 8	Hakodate	3 year old debut		1000m (Soft)	5	5	1.0 (1)	1st	0:59.5	–0.6	Futoshi Kojima	(Sea Bird Power)
Oct 3	Nakayama	Fuyo Tokubetsu	OP	1600m (Firm)	9	8	1.4 (1)	1st	1:35.8	–0.4	Futoshi Kojima	(May Storm)
Oct 31	Tokyo	Icho Tokubetsu	OP	1600m (Heavy)	7	4	1.3 (1)	2nd	1:38.2	0.4	Futoshi Kojima	Meiner Logik
Dec 20	Nakayama	Asahi Hai Sansai Stakes	1	1600m (Firm)	6	5	1.9 (1)	1st	1:35.6	–0.1	Futoshi Kojima	(Tsujino Shogun)
1988 – four-year-old season
Feb 14	Tokyo	Kyodo News Hai Yonsai Stakes	3	1800m (Firm)	12	3	2.4 (1)	4th	1:48.4	0.5	Futoshi Kojima	Muguet Royal
Mar 06	Tokyo	Hochi Hai Yayoi Sho (Note: both Yayoi Sho and Satsuki Sho this year was held in Tokyo Racecourse due to conflicting schedule.)	2	2000m (Firm)	11	7	5.5 (2)	1st	2:01.1	–0.1	Futoshi Kojima	(Tosho Mario)
Apr 17	Tokyo	Satsuki Sho	1	2000m (Firm)	18	2	4.2 (2)	3rd	2:01.5	0.2	Futoshi Kojima	Yaeno Muteki
May 29	Tokyo	Tokyo Yushun	1	2400m (Firm)	24	5	9.4 (3)	1st	2:26.3	–0.1	Futoshi Kojima	(Mejiro Ardan)
1989 – five-year-old season
May 14	Tokyo	Yasuda Kinen	1	1600m (Good)	17	4	7.2 (3)	16th	1:37.7	3.4	Futoshi Kojima	Bamboo Memory
Jun 11	Hanshin	Takarazuka Kinen	1	2200m (Good)	16	12	10.6 (4)	16th	2:18.8	4.8	Futoshi Kojima	Inari One

== Stud career and death ==
Sakura Chiyono O became a stud at Shizunai Stallion Station in 1990. He was a sparsely successful sire with his offsprings, with his most successful progenies being My Turn, who won the Tokai Stakes in 1999, as well as Sakura Super O who finished second in 1994 Satsuki Sho behind future triple crown winner Narita Brian.

He was retired from stud duty and castrated in 2002 and was pensioned at Shinwa Farm, where he would live out rest of his life. On January 6, 2012, he became unable to stand and died the next day due to old age.

== In popular culture ==
An anthropomorphized version of Sakura Chiyono O appears in the media franchise Umamusume: Pretty Derby, voiced by Ruriko Noguchi, and appears as a side character in the manga and anime spinoff Umamusume: Cinderella Gray. She is an energetic and cheery girl who idolizes Maruzensky, wanting to become her equal one day. She often keeps track of her findings in a notebook she calls "Chiyonotes", each one accompanied with a self-penned proverb.

== Pedigree ==
Pedigree of Sakura Chiyono O
Sire Maruzensky	Nijinsky	Northern Dancer	Nearctic
Sire Maruzensky	Nijinsky	Northern Dancer	Natalma
Sire Maruzensky	Nijinsky	Flaming Page	Bull Page
Sire Maruzensky	Nijinsky	Flaming Page	Flaring Top
Sire Maruzensky	Shill	Buckpasser	Tom Fool
Sire Maruzensky	Shill	Buckpasser	Busanda
Sire Maruzensky	Shill	Quill	Princequillo
Sire Maruzensky	Shill	Quill	Quick Touch
Dam Sakura Sedan	Sedan	Prince Bio	Prince Rose
Dam Sakura Sedan	Sedan	Prince Bio	Biologie
Dam Sakura Sedan	Sedan	Staffa	Orsenigo
Dam Sakura Sedan	Sedan	Staffa	Signa
Dam Sakura Sedan	Swanswood Grove	Grey Sovereign	Nasrullah
Dam Sakura Sedan	Swanswood Grove	Grey Sovereign	Kong
Dam Sakura Sedan	Swanswood Grove	Fakhry	Mahmud
Dam Sakura Sedan	Swanswood Grove	Fakhry	Fille de Salut

- Family No : 16–a
- Sakura Chiyono O was inbred 4 x 5 on Prince Rose who was Princequillo sire, 5 x 5 on Nearco (Nearctic and Nasrullah sire), 5 x 5 on Menow (Flaring Top and Tom Fool sire).
