= Mejiro Ardan =

Japanese thoroughbred racehorse

Mejiro Ardan メジロアルダン
- Mejiro Ardan at the 1988 NHK Mile Cup.
- Breed: Thoroughbred
- Sire: Aswan
- Grandsire: Northern Taste
- Dam: Mejiro Hiryu
- Damsire: Never Beat
- Sex: Stallion
- Foaled: March 28, 1985
- Died: June 18, 2002 (aged 17)
- Country: Japan
- Color: Dark bay
- Breeder: Mejiro Stud
- Owner: Mejiro Bokujo
- Racing colors
- Trainer: Shinji Okuhira
- Jockey: Hiroshi Kawachi; Yukio Okabe
- Record: 14: 4-3-2
- Earnings: ¥243,329,000

Major wins
- Takamatsunomiya Hai (1989)

Mejiro Ardan (Japanese: メジロアルダン, Hepburn: Mejiro Arudan; March 28, 1985 – June 18, 2002) was a Japanese Thoroughbred racehorse and stud horse. His main victory was at the 1989 Takamatsunomiya Hai. Because of his large build, heavy frame, and distinctive running style in which he stayed low to the ground, he was sometimes nicknamed a "heavy tank" although his legs were considered fragile throughout his life.

His older half-sister Mejiro Ramonu was the first-ever winner of the Fillies' Triple Crown in 1986.

== Background ==
Mejiro Ardan was born at Mejiro Stud on March 28, 1985. The early 1980s were considered a horse racing boom in Japan that produced many talented thoroughbreds; those born in 1985 were popular, sometimes as the "strongest generation in history." Other horses foaled that year included Oguri Cap, Yaeno Muteki, Super Creek, and Soccer Boy.

The name "Mejiro" originated with the farm he was born at, while "Ardan" was a result of Mejiro Stud's current naming theme for the year which borrowed from famous racehorses of the past. A horse named Ardan had won the Prix de l'Arc de Triomphe in 1944, though there was no blood relation between the two horses.

== Racing career ==
Mejiro Ardan won just a single graded race in his career, though he placed well at major races among other horses considered to be strong at the time. However, his weak legs were a detriment throughout his career, forcing him to take several long breaks and eventually causing his retirement. It also pushed his debut back by a year into 1988.

=== 1988: three-year-old season ===
When Mejiro Ardan finally debuted, it was on a dirt course over 1200 meters; the dirt was wet from a storm, which gave him an advantage due to his weak legs. He then comfortably won his first race on turf, the Yamafuji Sho, fulfilling one of the conditions for the Tōkyō Yūshun (Japanese Derby) by winning a 40000-and-under race.

The other condition for entering the Derby was to place in a trial race, and the team decided on the NHK Hai, which at the time was a G2 2000-meter race. He was the sixth favorite going into the event; as a trial race, many strong horses were set to take part, with Soccer Boy (the previous year's two-year-old champion) as the first favorite. Other notable racers included Meiner Logic (winner of the Ichо̄ Stakes) and Meiner Glauben.

Mejiro Ardan began the race in post 16, the furthest to the outside, but quickly took up a good position chasing the leaders. In the last 200 meters, he pulled into first place. A battle ensued between him and Meiner Glauben on the outside, which Kokusai Triple joined for a moment, but Meiner Glauben ended the race ahead of Mejiro Ardan by a head.

Despite placing in a Tōkyō Yūshun trial race, Mejiro Ardan may not have been able to take part if not for the loss of Chunika O, who placed 12th in this race after winning his own 40000-and-under race. Chunika O was forced to race in the Shirayuri Stakes instead, which was considered the "Zannen Derby" (or "Unfortunate Derby").

However, the Japanese Derby was only two weeks after the NHK Hai, and Mejiro Ardan was not in peak condition going into the race. His jockey Okabe remarked on the possibility of having to stop the horse partway through. Soccer Boy was the number-one favorite to win, with other strong racers such as Satsuki Sho winner Yaeno Muteki and Yayoi Sho winner Sakura Chiyono O also participating.

For the majority of the race, Mejiro Ardan kept pace behind the leading pack. He accelerated on the last 400 meters, catching up to and passing Sakura Chiyono O in the lead before the latter rallied and won the race over Ardan by a neck. Despite his late debut, this second-place finish cemented his status as one of the generation's best.

After the race, perhaps because of the difficult rotation, a fracture was discovered and Mejiro Ardan went on a year-long break to recover.

=== 1989: four-year-old season ===
As Mejiro Ardan began training again, he was often partnered up with lower-ranking horses and didn't run much. Nevertheless, the team prepared the horse for a comeback at the May Stakes, an open race, almost a year after his run at the Derby. He won the race easily.

His next five races made up the most successful part of his career. The next race in his rotation was the G2 Takamatsunomiya Hai. With his regular jockey Okabe abroad, Hiroshi Kawachi—who had jockeyed Mejiro Ramonu—took the spot. Also in the race was Bamboo Memory, whom Okabe himself had jockeyed in his Yasuda Kinen victory earlier that month.

During the race, Ardan kept a good position throughout and made a break for it on the first corner, passing Dai Yusaku and winning by 2.5 lengths. This was Ardan's first—and only—graded victory.

Mejiro Ardan would begin his autumn circuit with the Mainichi Okan, starting as the second favorite to Oguri Cap, with Inari One as the third. Mejiro Ardan fought well and clinched a third-place finish.

He then continued on to the autumn Tenno Sho, another race featuring very strong horses; Oguri Cap, Super Creek, Yaeno Muteki, and Inari One all participated in it, with Mejiro Ardan as the third-favorite. Once again, he placed third, this time to Super Creek and Oguri Cap.

Despite the team's plans to race Mejiro Ardan in the Japan Cup after that, a bowed tendon was discovered in his front-right leg, forcing him into another long hiatus.

=== 1990: five-year-old season ===
Okabe, Ardan's long-time regular jockey, left after the previous Tenno Sho, opting to jockey Yaeno Muteki for his races in 1990 after Yaeno's team offered him the reins for a revival. While Mejiro Ardan had great potential, he still had weak legs, including his bowed tendon. His team planned for a comeback at the Tomoe Sho in Hakodate that August, but he wasn't ready in time. Mejiro Ardan would finally return to racing in the autumn of 1990, where he took 4th at the Sankei Sho All Comers.

At the autumn Tenno Sho, he was jockeyed by a young hopeful named Norihiro Yokoyama, who would later go on to win many races. In the last 200 meters, Yaeno Muteki—jockeyed by Okabe—came in all the way on the inside and took the lead to clinch the win, with Ardan getting 2nd place by just a head.

His last race of the year was the Arima Kinen that December against powerful racers like Oguri Cap, Mejiro Ryan, and White Stone, but placed poorly despite being the number-two favorite.

=== 1991: six-year-old season ===
Mejiro Ardan began his six-year-old season at the Nikkei Shinshun Hai, where he placed 4th. His bowed tendon flared up after this, leading to his third hiatus.

He returned to race again that autumn, but didn't see results, placing 6th at the Fuji Stakes and 14th at the Japan Cup. After desmitis was discovered in his front-left leg, he was retired.

== Statistics ==
The following statistics are based on information from netkeiba and JBIS. (Note: Prior to Japan's revision of the way it counts horse ages to match the international standard in 2001, newborns used to be considered 1 year old, thus there is a one-year difference in the names of certain races.)

Date	Track	Name	Grade	Type/Distance	Field	Finished	Time	Jockey	Winner (2nd place)
1988 – three-year-old season
March 27, 1988	Tokyo	Four-year-old Unraced		Dirt 1200m	16	1st	1:13.8	Masatsugu Kashiwazaki	(Katatora Tholon)
April 17, 1988	Tokyo	Yamafuji Sho		Turf 1800m	13	1st	1:49.0	Yukio Okabe	(*)
May 8, 1988	Tokyo	NHK Hai	G2	Turf 2000m	16	2nd	2:02.0	Masamitsu Tamura	Meiner Glauben
May 29, 1988	Tokyo	Tōkyō Yūshun	G1	Turf 2400m	24	2nd	2:26.4	Yukio Okabe	Sakura Chiyono O
1989 – four-year-old season
May 27, 1989	Tokyo	May Stakes	OP	Turf 2400m	12	1st	2:27.5	Yukio Okabe	(High Ace Boy)
July 9, 1989	Chukyo	Takamatsunomiya Hai	G2	Turf 2000m	14	1st	1:58.9	Hiroshi Kawachi	(Bamboo Memory)
October 8, 1989	Tokyo	Mainichi Okan	G2	Turf 1800m	8	3rd	1:59.2	Yukio Okabe	Oguri Cap
October 29, 1989	Tokyo	Tenno Sho (Autumn)	G1	Turf 2000m	14	3rd	1:59.2	Yukio Okabe	Super Creek
1990 – five-year-old season
September 16, 1990	Nakayama	Sankei Sho All Comers	G3	Turf 2200m	17	4th	2:13.8	Yasuo Sugawara	Racketball
October 28, 1990	Tokyo	Tenno Sho (Autumn)	G1	Turf 2000m	18	2nd	1:58.2	Norihiro Yokoyama	Yaeno Muteki
December 23, 1990	Nakayama	Arima Kinen	G1	Turf 2500m	16	10th	2:34.9	Hiroshi Kawachi	Oguri Cap
1991 – six-year-old season
January 20, 1991	Kyoto	Nikkei Shinshun Hai	G2	Turf 2200m	9	4th	2:14.1	Yoshiyuki Muramoto	Merci Atla
November 10, 1991	Tokyo	Fuji Stakes	OP	Turf 1800m	8	6th	1:48.6	Masamitsu Tamura	Stabilizer
November 24, 1991	Tokyo	Japan Cup	G1	Turf 2400m	15	14th	2:27.4 (37.0)	Norihiro Yokoyama	Golden Pheasant

(*) 2nd place was a dead heat between Nakami Regent and Bold Victor.

== Retirement ==
Mejiro Ardan was retired to become a stud horse and went to Breeders Stallion Station. While a few of his progeny saw minor success, like Mejiro Steed (3rd at the American Jockey Club Cup) and Gulfin Dream (2nd at the Niigata Jump Stakes), none would exceed his achievements.

He was transferred to China in October 2000. One of his foals there, a horse named Wu Di, would also become a stud horse, winning a stud horse of the year award from the Chinese racing association in 2015.

Mejiro Ardan died in 2002 of a heart attack while mating. A grave was erected for him at the farm there.

== In popular culture ==
An anthropomorphized version of Mejiro Ardan appears as a character in the Japanese multimedia franchise Umamusume: Pretty Derby, voiced by Saya Aizawa. She is depicted as a thoughtful, kindhearted young woman who idolizes her older sister, Mejiro Ramonu, despite her delicate constitution. Similar to her real-life counterpart, she is frequently hospitalized due to her fragile legs, and finds student life at Tracen Academy a novel experience. However, she makes up for her physical deficiencies by closely researching her opponents' racing styles. She makes an appearance as a major character in the spin-off series Umamusume: Cinderella Gray.

== Pedigree ==
Pedigree of Mejiro Ardan
Sire Aswan	Northern Taste	Northern Dancer	Nearctic
Sire Aswan	Northern Taste	Northern Dancer	Natalma
Sire Aswan	Northern Taste	Lady Victoria	Victoria Park
Sire Aswan	Northern Taste	Lady Victoria	Lady Angela
Sire Aswan	Lily of the Nile	Never Bend	Nasrullah
Sire Aswan	Lily of the Nile	Never Bend	Lalun
Sire Aswan	Lily of the Nile	Nile Lily	Roman
Sire Aswan	Lily of the Nile	Nile Lily	Azalea
Dam Mejiro Hiryu	Never Beat	Never Say Die	Nasrullah
Dam Mejiro Hiryu	Never Beat	Never Say Die	Singing Grass
Dam Mejiro Hiryu	Never Beat	Bride Elect	Big Game
Dam Mejiro Hiryu	Never Beat	Bride Elect	Netherton Maid
Dam Mejiro Hiryu	Amazon Warrior	Khaled	Hyperion
Dam Mejiro Hiryu	Amazon Warrior	Khaled	Eclair
Dam Mejiro Hiryu	Amazon Warrior	War Betsy	War Relic
Dam Mejiro Hiryu	Amazon Warrior	War Betsy	Betsy Ross

== See also ==
- List of racehorses
- Mejiro Ramonu (older half-sister and winner of the Fillies' Triple Crown)
