= Ruriko Noguchi =

Japanese voice actress (born 1995)

- 野口 瑠璃子
- Born: July 6, 1995 (age 31); Kitakyushu, Fukuoka, Japan
- Occupation: Voice actress
- Years active: 2015–present
- Agent: Arts Vision
- Notable work: Bofuri as Risa Shiromine (Sally); Tamayomi as Nozomi Nakamura; Extreme Hearts as Hiyori Hayama; Hatsune Miku: Colorful Stage! as Ichika Hoshino

Ruriko Noguchi (野口 瑠璃子, Noguchi Ruriko; born July 6, 1995) is a Japanese voice actress from Fukuoka Prefecture who is affiliated with Arts Vision. She played her first main role in 2020 as Sally in Bofuri. Her other voice acting roles include Nozomi Nakamura in Tamayomi, Reika Kobato in Deep Insanity: The Lost Child, Hiyori Hayama in Extreme Hearts and Ichika Hoshino in Hatsune Miku: Colorful Stage!.

== Filmography ==
=== Anime ===
2015

- Sound! Euphonium, Brass band member (episodes 5 and 10)
- Wish Upon the Pleiades, Student C (episode 11)

2016

- Anne Happy, Pet owner (episode 4), Teacher (episode 1)
- Keijo, Momo Horiuchi (episodes 3 and 4)
- Show by Rock!!, Ailane
- Myriad Colors Phantom World, Student

2018

- Comic Girls, Ruki's mother (episode 4)

2020

- Bofuri, Risa Shiromine (Sally)
- Tamayomi, Nozomi Nakamura

2021

- Show by Rock!! Stars!!, Ailane
- Tropical-Rouge! Pretty Cure, Rika Ichijō
- Deep Insanity: The Lost Child, Reika Kobato

2022

- Petit Sekai, Ichika Hoshino
- Extreme Hearts, Hiyori Hayama

2023

- Bofuri 2nd Season, Risa Shiromine (Sally)
- Beyblade X, Multi Nanairo

2025

- Umamusume: Cinderella Gray, Sakura Chiyono O

=== Anime films ===
2025

- Colorful Stage! The Movie: A Miku Who Can't Sing, Ichika Hoshino

=== Video games ===
2020

- Hatsune Miku: Colorful Stage!, Ichika Hoshino

2021

- Umamusume: Pretty Derby, Sakura Chiyono O

2022

- Path to Nowhere as Luvia Ray, Stargazer

2024

- Card-en-Ciel as Ancie

2026

- Bunny Garden 2 as Kuon
