= Yaeno Muteki =

Japanese thoroughbred racehorse

Yaeno Muteki ヤエノムテキ
- Yaeno Muteki at the 1990 Yasuda Kinen.
- Breed: Thoroughbred
- Sire: Yamaninsky
- Grandsire: Nijinsky
- Dam: Tsurumi Star
- Damsire: Yellow God
- Sex: Stallion
- Foaled: April 11, 1985
- Died: March 28, 2014 (aged 28)
- Country: Japan
- Color: Chestnut
- Breeder: Miyamura Farm
- Owner: Fuji Ltd.
- Racing colors
- Trainer: Mitsuo Ogino
- Jockey: Katsuichi Nishiura; Yukio Okabe
- Record: 23: 8-4-3
- Earnings: ¥518,300,000 (JRA)

Major wins
- Kyoto Shimbun Hai (1988); Naruo Kinen (1988); Sankei Osaka Hai (1989); Tennō Shō (Autumn) (1990); Japanese Classic Race wins: Satsuki Shō (1988)

Awards
- 1990 JRA Award For Best Horse by Home-bred Sire

Yaeno Muteki (Japanese: ヤエノムテキ; 11 April 1985 - 28 March 2014) was a Japanese thoroughbred racehorse most known for winning the 1988 Satsuki Sho and the 1990 Autumn Tennō Shō.

== Racing career ==
Yaeno Muteki debuted in February 1988, winning his maiden race by seven lengths. He would follow up this victory with another at the Jinchoka Sho, prompting his team to try to enter him into the Satsuki Sho. However, he failed to meet the qualifications initially after placing 4th in the Mainichi Hai. He managed to score an entry into that years Satsuki Sho after being drawn via a lottery. However, he was given a disadvantageous starting gate for the course, and as a result was the 9th favorite to win. Despite this, he managed to secure victory by 3/4 of a length, winning his first Grade 1 title. He would have mixed success for the remainder of his career, winning several G2 races, such as the 1989 Sankei Osaka Hai. He would place 2nd in the 1990 Yasuda Kinen and 3rd in the Takarazuka Kinen. He would secure his second and final G1 title in the 1990 Tenno Sho (Autumn), besting the then favorite, Oguri Cap. His final race would be the 1990 Arima Kinen which he placed 7th. Prior to the race, he managed to break loose after entering the track, which was described as him holding his own retirement ceremony.

== Racing statistics ==
The following racing form is based on information available from JBIS-Search and netkeiba.com.

Date	Race	Class	Distance	Racecourse	Track	Finish	Entry	Time	Jockey	Winner (2nd Place)
1988 – three-year-old season
Feb 27	Three Year Old Debut	Maiden	1700 m	Hanshin	Dirt	1st	8	1:49.6	Katsuichi Nishiura	(Mejiro Marsyas)
Mar 19	Jinchoge Sho	Pre-OP	1700 m	Chukyo	Dirt	1st	8	1:48.1	Katsuichi Nishiura	(Agnes Turf)
Mar 27	Mainichi Hai	G3	2000 m	Hanshin	Turf	4th	10	2:05.5	Katsuichi Nishiura	Oguri Cap
Apr 17	Satsuki Sho	G1	2000 m	Tokyo	Turf	1st	18	2:01.3	Katsuichi Nishiura	(Dictar Land)
May 29	Tokyo Yushun	G1	2400 m	Tokyo	Turf	4th	24	2:26.9	Katsuichi Nishiura	Sakura Chiyono O
Jul 03	Chunichi Sports Yonsai	G3	1800 m	Chukyo	Turf	2nd	11	1:49.0	Katsuichi Nishiura	Soccer Boy
Sep 11	UHB Hai	Pre-OP	1800 m	Hakodate	Turf	1st	12	1:49.4	Katsuichi Nishiura	(Passing Power)
Oct 16	Kyoto Shimbun Hai	G2	2200 m	Kyoto	Turf	1st	16	2:14.5	Katsuichi Nishiura	(Koei Sport)
Nov 06	Kikuka Sho	G1	3000 m	Kyoto	Turf	10th	16	3:08.8	Katsuichi Nishiura	Super Creek
Dec 04	Naruo Kinen	G2	2500 m	Hanshin	Turf	1st	12	2:33.1	Katsuichi Nishiura	(Hatsushiba Ace)
1989 – four-year-old season
Jan 22	Nikkei Shinshun Hai	G2	2200 m	Kyoto	Turf	2nd	9	2:14.5	Katsuichi Nishiura	Land Hiryu
Apr 02	Sankei Osaka Hai	G2	2000 m	Hanshin	Turf	1st	13	2:01.4	Katsuichi Nishiura	(Land Hiryu)
Jun 11	Takarazuka Kinen	G1	2200 m	Hanshin	Turf	7th	16	2:15.6	Katsuichi Nishiura	Inari One
Oct 29	Tenno Sho (Autumn)	G1	2000 m	Tokyo	Turf	4th	14	1:59.5	Katsuichi Nishiura	Super Creek
Dec 24	Arima Kinen	G1	2500 m	Nakayama	Turf	6th	16	2:33.0	Katsuichi Nishiura	Inari One
1990 – five-year-old season
Jan 21	Nikkei Shinshun Hai	G2	2200 m	Kyoto	Turf	2nd	9	2:15.1	Katsuichi Nishiura	Towa Triple
Feb 25	Yomiuri Milers Cup	G2	1600 m	Hanshin	Turf	3rd	12	1:36.8	Katsuichi Nishiura	Mejiro Worth
Apr 01	Sankei Osaka Hai	G2	2000 m	Hanshin	Turf	3rd	9	2:03.1	Katsuichi Nishiura	Super Creek
May 13	Yasuda Kinen	G1	1600 m	Tokyo	Turf	2nd	16	1:32.7	Yukio Okabe	Oguri Cap
Jun 10	Takarazuka Kinen	G1	2200 m	Hanshin	Turf	3rd	10	2:14.7	Yukio Okabe	Osaichi George
Oct 28	Tenno Sho (Autumn)	G1	2000 m	Tokyo	Turf	1st	18	1:58.2	Yukio Okabe	(Mejiro Ardan)
Nov 25	Japan Cup	G1	2400 m	Tokyo	Turf	6th	15	2:23.8	Yukio Okabe	Better Loosen Up
Dec 23	Arima Kinen	G1	2500 m	Nakayama	Turf	7th	16	2:34.7	Yukio Okabe	Oguri Cap

== Retirement ==
Yaeno Muteki retired from racing after the 1990 Arima Kinen and became a breeding stallion at the Nikkapu Agricultural Cooperative Livestock Center. He would be moved to the Hidaka Stallion Station in Urakawa in 1997. He would pass away due to bowel obstruction on March 28, 2014.

== In popular culture ==
An anthropomorphized version of Yaeno Muteki appears as a character in the Japanese multimedia franchise Umamusume: Pretty Derby, voiced by Ayumi Hinohara. She is depicted as unruly and wild-tempered during her childhood, but later became a serious, dignified martial artist of the fictional "Kongo Yaegaki" school under the tutelage of her grandparents. While her rigid demeanor allows her to keep a level head, it also causes her to repress her competitive spirit out of fear that she may hurt someone emotionally or physically, and views any display of emotion as a weakness. Additionally, Yaeno struggles to control her protective instincts around things she views as "cute", such as cats, baby farm animals, and Curren Chan, a trait she also recognizes as a weakness and actively attempts to address with questionable success. She appears as a major character in the spin-off series Umamusume: Cinderella Gray, where she appears as a rival to Oguri Cap.

== Pedigree ==
Pedigree of Yaeno Muteki (JPN), 1985
Sire Yamaninsky (USA) 1975	Nijinsky (CAN); 1967	Northern Dancer (CAN)	Nearctic
Sire Yamaninsky (USA) 1975	Nijinsky (CAN); 1967	Northern Dancer (CAN)	Natalma
Sire Yamaninsky (USA) 1975	Nijinsky (CAN); 1967	Flaming Page	Bull Page
Sire Yamaninsky (USA) 1975	Nijinsky (CAN); 1967	Flaming Page	Flaring Top
Sire Yamaninsky (USA) 1975	Unmentionable (USA); 1970	Buckpasser	Tom Fool
Sire Yamaninsky (USA) 1975	Unmentionable (USA); 1970	Buckpasser	Busanda
Sire Yamaninsky (USA) 1975	Unmentionable (USA); 1970	Petticoat	Palestinian
Sire Yamaninsky (USA) 1975	Unmentionable (USA); 1970	Petticoat	Sabana
Dam Tsurumi Star 1980	Yellow God; 1967	Red God	Nasrullah
Dam Tsurumi Star 1980	Yellow God; 1967	Red God	Spring Run
Dam Tsurumi Star 1980	Yellow God; 1967	Sally Deans	Fun Fair
Dam Tsurumi Star 1980	Yellow God; 1967	Sally Deans	Cora Deans
Dam Tsurumi Star 1980	Fujiko; 1964	Solonaway	Solferino
Dam Tsurumi Star 1980	Fujiko; 1964	Solonaway	Anyway
Dam Tsurumi Star 1980	Fujiko; 1964	Hama Midori	Tosa Midori
Dam Tsurumi Star 1980	Fujiko; 1964	Hama Midori	Fuji Sakae (Family: 1-o)
