= Bamboo Memory =

Japanese Thoroughbred racehorse (foaled 1985)

Bamboo Memory; バンブーメモリー
- Bamboo Memory winning the 1989 Yasuda Kinen.
- Breed: Thoroughbred
- Sire: Morning Frolic
- Grandsire: Grey Dawn
- Dam: Madonna Bamboo
- Damsire: Moubariz
- Sex: Stallion
- Foaled: May 14, 1985
- Died: August 7, 2014 (aged 29)
- Country: Japan
- Colour: Chestnut
- Breeder: Bamboo Farm
- Owner: Tatsuichi Takeda
- Racing colours
- Trainer: Kunihiko Take
- Jockey: Yutaka Take; Masahiro Matsunaga; Hiroshi Kawachi; Yukio Okabe; Shigehiko Kishi; Seiki Tabara
- Record: 39: 8-5-4
- Earnings: ¥508,108,200

Major wins
- Yasuda Kinen (1989); Sprinters Stakes (1990); Swan Stakes (1989); Takamatsunomiya Hai (1990)

Awards
- JRA Award for Best Sprinter or Miler (1989, 1990)

Bamboo Memory (Japanese: バンブーメモリー, Banbū Memorī; 14 May 1985 – 7 August 2014) was a Japanese Thoroughbred racehorse and sire. He recorded eight wins from thirty-nine starts between 1987 and 1991, most notably the Yasuda Kinen (GI) in 1989 and the Sprinters Stakes (GI) in 1990. He was named Best Sprinter or Miler in both 1989 and 1990. He is best remembered for his photo-finish rivalry with Oguri Cap in the 1989 Mile Championship, and for setting a Japanese record in the 1990 Sprinters Stakes, which earned him the nickname "The First Lightning King".

== Background ==
Bamboo Memory was a chestnut stallion bred in Urakawa, Hokkaido, by Bamboo Farm. He was sired by Morning Frolic, and his dam was Madonna Bamboo, a mare by Moubariz. He was owned by Tatsuichi Takeda, the founder of Bamboo Farm, and trained by Kunihiko Take at the Ritto Training Center. He was known for his aggressive, front-running temperament and his tendency to pull hard during races and training.

== Racing career ==
=== 1987: two-year-old season ===
Bamboo Memory debuted on 14 November 1987 in a 2-year-old newcomer race over 1200 metres on dirt at Kyoto Racecourse, placing fifth. He finished the race in 1 minute and 17 seconds which placed him 3.7 seconds behind the winner Slew O' Best. After a second-place finish, he won his third maiden race over 1200 metres on dirt at Hanshin Racecourse on 27 December, ridden by Yutaka Take. He did this in 1 minute and 14.7 seconds, 0.7 seconds faster than the second place finish Chiyono Lady.

=== 1988: three-year-old season ===
Due to weak hooves, Bamboo Memory was campaigned primarily on dirt tracks during his three-year-old season. He competed in allowance races, collecting podium places for three races before recording a victory in a 1-win class race on March 6 against Jo Esperance by 0.3 seconds. On November 6 he placed third in a 1400 meter dirt race before winning a 2-win class race of the same distance by 0.1 seconds just three weeks later. He ended the year with a fifth place finish in the Port Island Stakes at Hanshin and an unplaced finish in the Santa Claus Handicap at Hanshin.

=== 1989: four-year-old season ===
Bamboo Memory initially began his four-year-old campaign by continuing on dirt for three more races, getting a seventh place finish and then two fourth place finishes. In total, he had ran 15 dirt races before switching to turf in April for the Dotonbori Stakes at Hanshin which was 1600 meters on heavy turf. He achieved first place by 0.9 seconds against Hishino Supra despite being the 6th most popular. He followed up with a third-place finish in the Silk Road Stakes (Open).

On 14 May, he contested the Yasuda Kinen (GI) at Tokyo Racecourse. Because Yutaka Take had a riding commitment with another horse at the Keihan Hai that day, Bamboo Memory was instead ridden by Yukio Okabe, who would go on to start as the 10th favourite in that race. In that race, the horse produced a strong late surge to defeat Daigo Sur by 0.2 seconds, marking his first Grade 1 victory. He then finished fifth in the Takarazuka Kinen (GI) behind Inari One, and second in the Takamatsunomiya Cup (GII) behind Mejiro Ardan.

In the autumn, he won the Swan Stakes (GII) at Kyoto by 0.6 seconds. On 19 November, he ran in the Mile Championship (GI) at Kyoto. In a "legendary match race" against Oguri Cap, Bamboo Memory overtook Oguri Cap on the outside of the final corner. The two horses "battled stride-for-stride to the wire", with Oguri Cap winning by a nose in a photo finish. He ended his season with a 13th-place finish in the Japan Cup (GI) behind Horlicks. He was named Best Sprinter or Miler at the 1989 JRA Awards.

=== 1990: five-year-old season ===
After a brief rest, Bamboo Memory returned in the spring, finishing fifth in the Keio Hai Spring Cup (GII), sixth in the Yasuda Kinen, and sixth in the Takarazuka Kinen. In the summer, he finished second in the CBC Sho (GII) before winning the Takamatsunomiya Cup (GII) at Chukyo Racecourse.

In the autumn, he finished fifth in the Mainichi Ōkan (GII) and third in the Tennō Shō (Autumn) (GI) behind Yaeno Muteki. He then finished second for the second consecutive year in the Mile Championship, this time beaten by Passing Shot. On 16 December, he contested the Sprinters Stakes (GI) at Nakayama Racecourse, which had been elevated to Grade 1 status that year. Settling just behind the fast pace set by Daiwa Douglas and Daitaku Helios, he navigated through the field in the straight and won by 0.4 seconds in a Japanese record time of 1:07.8. He was named Best Sprinter or Miler at the 1990 JRA Awards.

=== 1991: six-year-old season ===
Bamboo Memory began his six-year-old season with a fourth-place finish in the Keio Hai Spring Cup. On 12 May, he started as the heavy favourite in the Yasuda Kinen but finished third behind Daiichi Ruby and Daitaku Helios. He then finished 10th in the Takarazuka Kinen and ninth in the CBC Sho. After unplaced runs in the Mainichi Ōkan and the Swan Stakes, he finished eighth in the Mile Championship behind Daitaku Helios. He was retired from racing following this performance, and a retirement ceremony was held at Hanshin Racecourse on 8 December 1991.

== Race record ==
The following table details all 39 starts of Bamboo Memory's racing career based on official JBIS and netkeiba records. Record current as of his final start on 17 November 1991.

Date	Distance (Condition)	Race	Class	Course	Odds (Favourite)	Field	Finish	Time	Jockey	Winning (Losing) Margin	Winner (2nd Place)	Ref
1987 – two-year-old season
Nov 14	Dirt 1200 m (Good)	2-Y-O Newcomer	Maiden	Kyoto	7.1 (3rd)	10	5th	1:17.3	Yutaka Take	3.7	Slew O'Best	
Nov 28	Dirt 1400 m (Heavy)	2-Y-O Newcomer	Maiden	Kyoto	4.0 (2nd)	13	2nd	1:26.7	Yutaka Take	0.1	Marubutsu Moses	
Dec 27	Dirt 1200 m (Good)	2-Y-O Maiden	Maiden	Hanshin	2.3 (1st)	12	1st	1:14.7	Yutaka Take	–0.5	(Chiyono Lady)	
1988 – three-year-old season
Jan 9	Dirt 1400 m (Yielding)	3-Y-O 1-win	1-win	Kyoto	7.9 (4th)	10	2nd	1:26.3	Yutaka Take	0.4	Naru Ace	
Jan 16	Dirt 1200 m (Good)	Shiroume Sho	1-win	Kyoto	5.4 (3rd)	10	3rd	1:13.9	Yutaka Take	0.3	Eiko Caesar	
Feb 6	Dirt 1200 m (Good)	3-Y-O 1-win	1-win	Kyoto	4.8 (2nd)	10	2nd	1:15.2	Yutaka Take	0.0	Otemba Gal	
Mar 6	Dirt 1800 m (Good)	3-Y-O 2-win	2-win	Hanshin	2.7 (1st)	12	1st	1:14.0	Yutaka Take	–0.3	(Jo Esperance)	
Nov 6	Dirt 1400 m (Yielding)	Tennozan Tokubetsu	2-win	Kyoto	12.0 (4th)	14	3rd	1:24.9	Hiroshi Kawachi	0.4	Dyna Agatha	
Nov 27	Dirt 1400 m (Good)	Momoyama Tokubetsu	2-win	Kyoto	5.0 (3rd)	12	1st	1:24.5	Masahiro Matsunaga	–0.1	(Dancing Sam)	
Dec 10	Dirt 1200 m (Good)	Port Island Stakes	3-win	Hanshin	2.8 (1st)	9	5th	1:12.9	Masahiro Matsunaga	0.0	Wonder Dresser	
Dec 25	Dirt 1800 m (Good)	Santa Claus Handicap	3-win	Hanshin	11.4 (7th)	16	14th	1:54.2	Masahiro Matsunaga	2.3	Dokanjo	
1989 – four-year-old season
Jan 13	Dirt 1400 m (Heavy)	Kadomatsu Stakes	3-win	Kyoto	5.9 (2nd)	16	7th	1:23.4	Masahiro Matsunaga	0.4	Wonder Teio	
Jan 28	Dirt 1400 m (Heavy)	Rashomon Stakes	3-win	Kyoto	7.4 (5th)	13	4th	1:23.6	Masahiro Matsunaga	0.4	Dancing Sam	
Feb 12	Dirt 1800 m (Yielding)	Kashihara Stakes	3-win	Kyoto	16.5 (4th)	12	4th	1:51.0	Yutaka Take	0.6	Taka Raiden	
Mar 5	Dirt 1800 m (Heavy)	Naruto Stakes	3-win	Hanshin	10.2 (4th)	15	12th	1:52.4	Yutaka Take	1.4	Nostalgia	
Apr 8	Turf 1600 m (Heavy)	Dotonbori Stakes	3-win	Hanshin	10.5 (6th)	10	1st	1:36.5	Yutaka Take	–0.9	(Hishino Supra)	
May 6	Turf 1600 m (Good)	Silk Road Stakes	Open	Kyoto	6.0 (3rd)	14	3rd	1:35.8	Masahiro Matsunaga	0.1	Shiyono Roman	
May 14	Turf 1600 m (Yielding)	Yasuda Kinen	GI	Tokyo	18.7 (10th)	17	1st	1:34.3	Yukio Okabe	–0.2	(Daigo Sur)	
Jun 11	Turf 2200 m (Good)	Takarazuka Kinen	GI	Hanshin	22.5 (8th)	16	5th	2:15.4	Masahiro Matsunaga	1.4	Inari One	
Jul 9	Turf 2000 m (Yielding)	Takamatsunomiya Hai	GII	Chukyo	8.2 (4th)	14	2nd	1:59.3	Masahiro Matsunaga	0.4	Mejiro Ardan	
Oct 29	Turf 1400 m (Good)	Swan Stakes	GII	Kyoto	3.5 (1st)	16	1st	1:21.7	Masahiro Matsunaga	–0.6	(Eagle Chateau)	
Nov 19	Turf 1600 m (Good)	Mile Championship	GI	Kyoto	4.0 (2nd)	17	2nd	1:34.6	Yutaka Take	0.0	Oguri Cap	
Nov 26	Turf 2400 m (Good)	Japan Cup	GI	Tokyo	48.6 (13th)	15	13th	2:24.2	Masahiro Matsunaga	2.0	Horlicks	
1990 – five-year-old season
Jan 5	Turf 2000 m (Good)	Kyoto Kimpai	GIII	Kyoto	–	14	SCR	–	Yutaka Take	–	Osaichi George	
Apr 22	Turf 1400 m (Heavy)	Keio Hai Spring Cup	GII	Tokyo	1.8 (1st)	18	5th	1:24.6	Yutaka Take	1.3	Shin Wind	
May 13	Turf 1600 m (Good)	Yasuda Kinen	GI	Tokyo	9.0 (3rd)	16	6th	1:33.4	Hiroshi Kawachi	1.0	Oguri Cap	
Jun 10	Turf 2200 m (Good)	Takarazuka Kinen	GI	Hanshin	49.1 (8th)	10	6th	2:15.5	Masahiro Matsunaga	1.5	Osaichi George	
Jun 24	Turf 1200 m (Good)	CBC Sho	GII	Chukyo	2.1 (1st)	16	2nd	1:08.4	Yutaka Take	0.1	Passing Shot	
Jul 8	Turf 2000 m (Good)	Takamatsunomiya Hai	GII	Chukyo	2.1 (1st)	14	1st	1:59.4	Yutaka Take	–0.3	(Shin Wind)	
Oct 7	Turf 1800 m (Good)	Mainichi Ōkan	GII	Tokyo	2.8 (2nd)	10	5th	1:47.2	Hiroshi Kawachi	0.5	Lucky Guerlain	
Oct 28	Turf 2000 m (Good)	Tennō Shō (Autumn)	GI	Tokyo	8.9 (4th)	18	3rd	1:58.4	Yutaka Take	0.2	Yaeno Muteki	
Nov 18	Turf 1600 m (Good)	Mile Championship	GI	Kyoto	1.6 (1st)	18	2nd	1:33.8	Yutaka Take	0.2	Passing Shot	
Dec 16	Turf 1200 m (Good)	Sprinters Stakes	GI	Nakayama	3.8 (1st)	16	1st	R1:07.8	Yutaka Take	–0.4	(Louis Teito)	
1991 – six-year-old season
Apr 21	Turf 1400 m (Good)	Keio Hai Spring Cup	GII	Tokyo	3.1 (1st)	18	4th	1:22.1	Yutaka Take	0.6	Daiichi Ruby	
May 12	Turf 1600 m (Good)	Yasuda Kinen	GI	Tokyo	1.8 (1st)	16	3rd	1:34.1	Yutaka Take	0.3	Daiichi Ruby	
Jun 9	Turf 2200 m (Good)	Takarazuka Kinen	GI	Kyoto	17.1 (4th)	10	10th	2:15.7	Shigehiko Kishi	2.1	Mejiro Ryan	
Jun 23	Turf 1200 m (Heavy)	CBC Sho	GII	Chukyo	1.6 (1st)	11	9th	1:12.1	Yutaka Take	1.3	Fame of Lass	
Oct 6	Turf 1800 m (Yielding)	Mainichi Ōkan	GII	Tokyo	10.3 (8th)	13	6th	1:46.9	Masahiro Matsunaga	0.8	Prekrasnie	
Oct 26	Turf 1400 m (Good)	Swan Stakes	GII	Kyoto	6.2 (3rd)	16	8th	1:21.3	Yutaka Take	0.7	K.S. Miracle	
Nov 17	Turf 1600 m (Good)	Mile Championship	GI	Kyoto	10.6 (3rd)	15	8th	1:35.7	Seiki Tabara	0.9	Daitaku Helios	

- R indicated that it was a record time finish

== Stud career ==
Bamboo Memory entered stud at Bamboo Farm in 1992. He was not a commercial success, siring only 38 registered foals over 13 seasons, though he did produce a few regional graded stakes winners such as Yoshino Memory and Bonanza Memory. He was retired from stud duty in 2005 and was pensioned at Bamboo Farm.

== After retirement ==
Bamboo Memory lived out his remaining years at Bamboo Farm. He died of old age on 7 August 2014 at the age of 29.

== In popular culture ==
An anthropomorphized version of Bamboo Memory appears as a character in the Japanese multimedia franchise Umamusume: Pretty Derby, voiced by Kotomi Aihara. She is depicted as the hot-blooded leader of Tracen Academy's Public Discipline Committee, and admires her father's storied past of fierce competition with a rival, which she seeks to emulate in her racing career. She has a talent for kendo and other martial arts, and is close friends and training partners with Yaeno Muteki. She makes an appearance as a minor character in the spin-off series Umamusume: Cinderella Gray.

== Pedigree ==
Pedigree of Bamboo Memory (JPN)
Sire Morning Frolic (USA) 1975	Grey Dawn (FR); 1962	Herbager	Vandale
Sire Morning Frolic (USA) 1975	Grey Dawn (FR); 1962	Herbager	Flagette
Sire Morning Frolic (USA) 1975	Grey Dawn (FR); 1962	Polamia	Mahmoud
Sire Morning Frolic (USA) 1975	Grey Dawn (FR); 1962	Polamia	Ampola
Sire Morning Frolic (USA) 1975	Timely Affair (USA); 1971	Bold Hour	Bold Ruler
Sire Morning Frolic (USA) 1975	Timely Affair (USA); 1971	Bold Hour	Seven Thirty
Sire Morning Frolic (USA) 1975	Timely Affair (USA); 1971	Friendly Relations	Nearctic
Sire Morning Frolic (USA) 1975	Timely Affair (USA); 1971	Friendly Relations	Flaring Top
Dam Madonna Bamboo (JPN) 1978	Moubariz (GB); 1971	Sing Sing	Tudor Minstrel
Dam Madonna Bamboo (JPN) 1978	Moubariz (GB); 1971	Sing Sing	Agin the Law
Dam Madonna Bamboo (JPN) 1978	Moubariz (GB); 1971	Musaka	Guard's Tie
Dam Madonna Bamboo (JPN) 1978	Moubariz (GB); 1971	Musaka	Artemisa
Dam Madonna Bamboo (JPN) 1978	Nimbus Bamboo (JPN); 1964	Nimbus	Nearco
Dam Madonna Bamboo (JPN) 1978	Nimbus Bamboo (JPN); 1964	Nimbus	Kong
Dam Madonna Bamboo (JPN) 1978	Nimbus Bamboo (JPN); 1964	Yashima Temple	Theft
Dam Madonna Bamboo (JPN) 1978	Nimbus Bamboo (JPN); 1964	Yashima Temple	Kamisho

- Bamboo Memory is inbred 5 × 4 to Nearco.
- His half-brother Bamboo Genesis won the March Stakes.

== See also ==
- Thoroughbred racing in Japan
