= Maruzensky =

Japanese thoroughbred racehorse (1974–1997)

Maruzensky マルゼンスキー
- Breed: Thoroughbred
- Sire: Nijinsky (CAN)
- Grandsire: Northern Dancer (CAN)
- Dam: Shill
- Damsire: Buckpasser
- Sex: Stallion
- Foaled: May 19, 1974
- Died: August 21, 1997 (aged 23)
- Country: Japan
- Color: Bay
- Breeder: Hashimoto Bokujou
- Owner: Zenkichi Hashimoto
- Racing colors
- Trainer: Shigehiko Hongo
- Jockey: Seiichi Nakanowatari
- Record: 8: 8–0–0
- Earnings: 76,601,000 JPY

Major wins
- Fuchu Sansai Stakes (1976); Asahi Hai Sansai Stakes (1976)

Awards
- JRA Award for Best Two-Year-Old Colt (1976)

Honors
- Japan Racing Association Hall of Fame (1990)

Maruzensky (Japanese: マルゼンスキー, Hepburn: Maruzensukī; May 19, 1974 – August 21, 1997) was an undefeated Japanese Thoroughbred racehorse and sire.

His racing career was extremely successful, winning all of the races he entered, including the Asahi Hai Sansai Stakes which he had won with a massive gap, earning the nickname "Supercar" in the process. However, as horses brought over from abroad into Japan at the time were barred from entering any of the Triple Crown races, the horse was unable to enter the Japanese Classics.

As a sire, he was also successful, producing Derby winner Sakura Chiyono O, as well as 3 other Grade I winners, among others.

== Background ==
Maruzensky's dam, Shill, by Buckpasser, was bought at the Keeneland Sales in the autumn of 1973 by Zenkichi Hashimoto, father of future Olympic athlete and Diet member Seiko Hashimoto. Hashimoto, while having owned cows at his ranch, was relatively new to the world of owning racehorses when he was on a business trip from Japan. There, he also met the horse's future trainer, Shigehiko Hongo.

At the auction, Hashimoto was told by his interpreter that, given her mare line, as well as the fact that the horse was pregnant with a foal of Nijinsky, it was expected that the horse would bid at a high price. Feeling both insulted by the interpreter for his career involving owning cows and a desire to buy Shill for himself, he wound up buying the horse for 300 thousand US dollars, which would have amounted to about 90 million Japanese yen at the time.

After being shipped to Japan, Shill foaled a colt on May 19, 1974. Hashimoto planned to give the Maruzen yagō to the horse, and went with "Maruzensky" as the foal was a colt, rather than "Miss Maruzen" had it been a filly.

Two years later, the horse entered Hongo's stable in July 1976.

== Racing career ==
=== 1976: two-year-old season ===
Maruzensky's maiden race was on October 9, with Seiichi Nakanowatari as his jockey. There, the horse handily beat the other horses, finishing the race with more than a 2 second gap over 2nd place. Maruzensky also won his next race, an allowance race, where he finished with a 9-length gap over second.

The horse was then entered into the Fuchu Sansai Stakes, an open race, on November 21. The race was contested by only 5 runners, including Hokkaido Sansai Stakes winner Hishi Speed, who had almost caught up to Maruzensky in the race due to Nakanowatari not anticipating any other horse to catch up to him, and had let the horse run slowly. Maruzensky and Hishi Speed ran neck and neck, resulting in a photo finish which concluded that Maruzensky beat the latter by a nose.

On December 12, the horse was entered into the Asahi Hai Sansai Stakes. There, the horse took the lead early on, and ran in the lead, finishing the race with a 13-length margin. His time, 1:34.4, was a course record that would not be broken for 14 years until Lindo Shaver broke it in 1990. After the race, Nakanowatari commented that he "couldn't even hear the footsteps of the other horses" past the 3rd corner. Hishi Speed's jockey, Futoshi Kojima, commented "That thing is a monster... To be honest, I'm glad I won't have to deal with [Maruzensky] for a while" regarding the winner of the race.

For his performances, he was awarded the Yushun Sho Saiyushu Sansai Boba that year.

=== 1977: three-year-old season ===
Maruzensky started off the season with an open race held at Chukyo Racecourse with the intention of running in the Kisaragi Sho. However, other trainers feared losing to the undefeated horse, and avoided entering the race. The open race was almost canceled were it not for Masatoshi Hattori entering two of the horses under his training. Maruzensky ultimately won the race by a 2 and a half-length lead. After this win, however, Maruzensky fractured his shin, and was forced to take a three-month break.

Maruzensky returned to racing that May, and won another open race with a 7-length lead, but the horse was unable to enter the Tokyo Yushun (Japanese Derby) as horses brought over from abroad, including as fetuses at the time, were barred from running in a Triple Crown race. Nakanowatari reportedly begged to have the horse enter the race, pleading "Let [Maruzensky] enter the Japanese Derby. I don't care if the horse starts from the furthest outside. We won't interfere the other horses. We don't need the prize money. We just want to see how the horse would do". Hashimoto planned to go to court over this, but ultimately the decision was unchanged. Maruzensky being barred from entering the Derby caused controversy within the horse racing circle of Japan, with the official JRA magazine, Yushun, even holding a discussion panel on its September 1977 issue.

On June 26, Maruzensky was entered in to the Nihon Tampa Sho, where nearly 80,000 people attended to see the horse run. Maruzensky faced off the NHK Hai and future Kikka Sho winner Press Toko, but by far the most favored to win was Maruzensky, whose parimutuel odds were consistently at 1.0. At the race, Maruzensky quickly took the lead and had already gained a 6 to 7-length lead by the first corner. However, after passing the third corner the horse suddenly lost momentum and was almost passed by Inter Spencer. Maruzensky quickly regained the lead and ultimately finished the race with a 7-length lead. Nakanowatari later commented that "the track was bad that day, so I tried to run on the outside to keep the horse safe. Then Inter Spencer came up and the horse became aloof".

After this race, Maruzensky was moved to Hokkaido to run in a couple of races at Sapporo and Hakodate before running a race in autumn before the Arima Kinen. He was subsequently entered in to the Tankyori Stakes at Sapporo. Initially, there were plans of Tosho Boy running in that race alongside Maruzensky. However, that plan never materialized, and ultimately that race was run with only 5 runners. In the race, a filly named Yoshio Kazan took the lead and made Maruzensky run in 2nd within the pack, which was a first for the horse. However, Maruzensky gradually took over the lead and ultimately won the race with a record time of 1:10.1.

The horse was then moved to Hakodate. However, during training, Maruzensky had developed tendonitis, partly due to hitting the railings there. All of autumn was spent recovering from it, but symptoms began showing again when the horse was training for the Arima Kinen. While the tendonitis itself was relatively light, both Hashimoto and Hongo agreed to retire the horse as the only major races the horse could have entered by that time were the Arima Kinen and Takarazuka Kinen.

A retirement ceremony was held at Tokyo Racecourse on January 15, 1978.

== Stud career ==
Upon retirement, Maruzensky was sent to the Toyosato Stallion Center in Monbetsu, Hokkaido to stand stud there. As a stallion, Maruzensky was a successful sire, producing Kikka Sho winner Horisky in one of his first crops, as well as Derby winner Sakura Chiyono O, Takarazuka Kinen winner Suzuka Koban, and Kikka Sho winner Leo Durban.

Maruzensky was also successful as a broodmare sire, siring dams of two Derby winners, Winning Ticket and Special Week, as well as Rice Shower, Mejiro Bright, and Primo Ordine among other Grade I winners.

Maruzensky died on August 21, 1997, after suffering a heart attack. A funeral was held three days later on August 24, attended by many people as well as his dam, who was still alive at the time, before being buried on the Hashimoto Bokujou property.

=== Notable progeny ===
Below data is based on JBIS Stallion Reports. c = colt, f = filly

bold = grade 1 stakes

Foaled	Name	Sex	Major Wins
1979	Horisky	c	**Kikuka Sho**
1980	Nishinosky	c	**Asahi Hai Sansai Stakes**
1980	Suzuka Koban	c	**Takarazuka Kinen**, Kobe Shimbun Hai, Kyoto Daishoten (twice)
1981	Sakura Toko	c	Hakodate Sansai Stakes, Tanabata Sho
1982	Blacksky	c	Niigata Kinen, Fukushima Kinen, March Stakes (Japan)
1985	Sakura Chiyono O	c	**Asahi Hai Sansai Stakes**, **Tokyo Yushun**, Yayoi Sho
1986	Carib Song	c	February Handicap, Meguro Kinen, Kimpai (East), Breeders' Gold Cup
1988	Leo Durban	c	**Kikuka Sho**, Aoba Sho
1989	Uto Jane	f	Niigata Nisai Stakes
1991	Sakura Eiko O	c	Yayoi Sho, Tanabata Sho, Hyacinth Stakes

== In popular culture ==
An anthropomorphized version of Maruzensky appears as a character in the Japanese multimedia franchise Umamusume: Pretty Derby, voiced by Lynn. She is depicted as a woman with an affinity for 1990s culture, with a running gag centered around her inability to comprehend contemporary trends, her insistence that her tastes are still relevant, and speculation on her actual age due to being one of the oldest real-life racehorses introduced in the series. While presenting as a Tracen Academy student, Maruzensky is noted to live off-campus by herself, and owns a red Lamborghini Countach in reference to the real horse's "Supercar" nickname. Despite her remarkable talent, she has no real goals or ambitions, and no motivation for competing in races beyond pure enjoyment. She makes an appearance as a supporting character in the spin-off series Umamusume: Cinderella Gray as Symboli Rudolf's right hand and confidant, fulfilling the role taken by Air Groove in the mobile game and anime series.

== Racing form ==
The following racing form is based on information available on JBIS and netkeiba.

Date	Age	Course	Race	Distance (Condition)	Field	Odds (Favourite)	Finish	Time	Margins	Jockey	Runner-up
Oct 9, 1976	3	Nakayama	Three Year Old Debut (Note: The age counting for horses in Japan was based on the East Asian age reckoning until it was changed to international standards in 2001.)	Turf 1200 m (Firm)	8	1.7 (1st)	1st	1:11.0	12 lengths	Seiichi Nakanowatari	Oriondahda
Oct 30, 1976	3	Nakayama	Icho Tokubetsu	Turf 1200 m (Firm)	9	1.3 (1st)	1st	1:10.5	9 lengths	Seiichi Nakanowatari	Shadai Aisse
Nov 21, 1976	3	Tokyo	Fuchu Sansai Stakes	Turf 1600 m (Good)	5	1.4 (1st)	1st	1:37.9	nose	Seiichi Nakanowatari	Hishi Speed
Dec 12, 1976	3	Nakayama	Asahi Hai Sansai Stakes	Turf 1600 m (Firm)	6	1.7 (1st)	1st	R1:34.4	13 lengths	Seiichi Nakanowatari	Hishi Speed
Jan 22, 1977	4	Chukyo	Four Year Old Open	Turf 1600 m (Firm)	5	1.3 (1st)	1st	1:36.4	2 1/2 lengths	Seiichi Nakanowatari	Jo Quickly
May 7, 1977	4	Tokyo	Four Year Old Open	Turf 1600 m (Firm)	5	1.6 (1st)	1st	1:36.3	7 lengths	Seiichi Nakanowatari	Long Ichi
Jun 26, 1977	4	Nakayama	Nihon Tampa Sho	Turf 1800 m (Heavy)	7	1.2 (1st)	1st	1:51.4	7 lengths	Seiichi Nakanowatari	Press Toko
Jul 24, 1977	4	Sapporo	Tankyori Stakes	Dirt 1200 m (Firm)	5	1.6 (1st)	1st	R1:10.1	10 lengths	Seiichi Nakanowatari	Hishi Speed

- R in the chart and the time written in red indicates the horse finished in record time.

== Pedigree ==
Pedigree of Maruzensky
Sire Nijinsky 1967 b.	Northern Dancer; 1961 b.	Nearctic	Nearco
Sire Nijinsky 1967 b.	Northern Dancer; 1961 b.	Nearctic	Lady Angela
Sire Nijinsky 1967 b.	Northern Dancer; 1961 b.	Natalma	Native Dancer
Sire Nijinsky 1967 b.	Northern Dancer; 1961 b.	Natalma	Almahmoud
Sire Nijinsky 1967 b.	Flaming Page; 1959 b.	Bull Page	Bull Lea
Sire Nijinsky 1967 b.	Flaming Page; 1959 b.	Bull Page	Our Page
Sire Nijinsky 1967 b.	Flaming Page; 1959 b.	Flaring Top	Menow
Sire Nijinsky 1967 b.	Flaming Page; 1959 b.	Flaring Top	Flaming Top
Dam Shill 1970 b,	Buckpasser; 1963 b.	Tom Fool	Menow
Dam Shill 1970 b,	Buckpasser; 1963 b.	Tom Fool	Gaga
Dam Shill 1970 b,	Buckpasser; 1963 b.	Busanda	War Admiral
Dam Shill 1970 b,	Buckpasser; 1963 b.	Busanda	Businesslike
Dam Shill 1970 b,	Quill; 1956 ch.	Princequillo	Prince Rose
Dam Shill 1970 b,	Quill; 1956 ch.	Princequillo	Cosquilla
Dam Shill 1970 b,	Quill; 1956 ch.	Quick Touch	Count Fleet
Dam Shill 1970 b,	Quill; 1956 ch.	Quick Touch	Alms

- Maruzensky was inbred 4x4 to Menow, and 5x5 to both Bull Dog and Blue Larkspur, meaning that these horses will appear in the 4th or 5th generations respectively.

== See also ==
- List of leading Thoroughbred racehorses
