= List of The Duke of Death and His Maid episodes =

The Duke of Death and His Maid is an anime television series based on the manga series of the same name by Koharu Inoue. The CGI-centric anime series was first announced in February 2021 and produced by J.C.Staff. It was directed by Yoshinobu Yamakawa, with Hideki Shirane overseeing the series' scripts, Michiru Kuwabata designing the characters, and Gen Okuda and Takeshi Watanabe composing the series' music. Crunchyroll licensed the series outside of Asia. Plus Media Networks Asia licensed the series in Southeast Asia and aired it on Aniplus Asia. Medialink licensed the series in Hong Kong, Taiwan, and Macau, streaming it on their Ani-One Asia YouTube channel.

The first season aired from July 4 to September 19, 2021, on Tokyo MX, BS11 and ytv. The opening theme song is "Mangetsu to Silhouette no Yoru" (満月とシルエットの夜; lit. 'Full Moon and Silhouette's Night') performed by Natsuki Hanae and Ayumi Mano, while the ending theme song is "Nocturne" (夜想曲(ノクターン), Nokutān) which is also performed by Mano. At the end of the first-season finale, it was announced that a second season had been green-lit, which aired from July 9 to September 24, 2023. The opening theme song is "Kimi to Revue" (君とレヴュー) performed by Hanae and Mano, while the ending theme song is "Hoshikuzu Requiem" (星屑レクイエム) performed by Nasuo. At the end of the second-season finale, it was announced that a third and final season was in production, which aired from April 7 to June 23, 2024. The opening theme song is "Cinematic Parade" (シネマティックパレード) performed by Nasuo, while the ending theme song is "Étoile Mémoire" (エトワールメモワール) performed by Mano.

== Series overview ==
Season	Episodes	Originally released	
Season	Episodes	First released	Last released
1	12	July 4, 2021	September 19, 2021
2	12	July 9, 2023	September 24, 2023
3	12	April 7, 2024	June 23, 2024

== Episodes ==
Note: All episodes were directed by series director Yoshinobu Yamakawa.

=== Season 1 (2021) ===
No. overall	No. in season	Title	Written by	Storyboarded by	Original release date
1	1	"The Duke and Alice"; Transliteration: "Botchan to Arisu" (Japanese: 坊ちゃんとアリス)	Hideki Shirane	Yoshinobu Yamakawa	July 4, 2021
A young boy known as the Duke of Death is cursed by a witch so any living thing he touches dies, so his noble mother banished him to a mansion far away. He is served by a maid, Alice, a childhood friend who, despite knowing his touch would be fatal, enjoys tempting him with her body so she can enjoy his reactions and is the only one who spends time with him. Another childhood friend, Phillip, asks if he can visit and Duke agrees as he hopes to have friends again. Phillip arrives with guards who deter Duke from getting too close, ruining Duke's hopes. Phillip is scared when Duke accidentally touches a plant which withers away, and tries to convince Alice to leave Duke whom he calls a monster. Phillip reveals Duke's mother forced him to visit as a spy, revealing she hopes to replace Duke as family heir with his younger brother and cut Duke off from the family entirely. Phillip then leaves, swearing to never visit again. Duke is heartbroken but swears to one day break his curse and repay all Alice's kindness by confessing his love and asking her to marry him.
2	2	"The Duke, His Butler, and a Lost Cat"; Transliteration: "Botchan to Shitsuji to Mayoi Neko" (Japanese: 坊ちゃんと執事と迷い猫)	Hideki Shirane	Kiyoko Sayama	July 11, 2021
Rob, Duke's elderly butler, returns to work but Duke worries as Rob has bad eyesight and is constantly in danger of bumping into Duke. Duke begins focusing on his piano, hoping to one day make a living writing songs. He plays Alice a song he wrote for her and Alice almost kisses him after he falls asleep. Duke is abruptly visited by his sister Viola who has an annoying girly personality. Viola instantly sees Duke is smitten with Alice and teases him. She surprisingly tells Duke to break his curse quickly so he can come home. She then bumps into Rob accidentally, revealing she has a crush on him. A cat wanders into the mansion, putting Duke on edge as he can't predict if the cat will try to touch him. Rob finds a confusing note in its collar asking for forgiveness, leading Duke to believe the cat was abandoned. Releasing it outside Duke sees it actually has a wife and several kittens. Later that night Duke asks Alice to dance and though it is difficult they manage to waltz without touching. With the dance over Duke nervously asks Alice how she feels about him and she admits she loves and adores him.
3	3	"The Duke and the Meteor Shower During the Full Moon"; Transliteration: "Botchan to Mangetsu no Ryūseigun" (Japanese: 坊ちゃんと満月の流星群)	Hideki Shirane	Kiyoko Sayama	July 18, 2021
Alice asks Duke to a festival in town, with Duke in a costume heavy enough he won't pose a danger. A masked woman named Daleth recognises Alice as Sharon Lendrott's daughter. Duke helps a lost child feel better by playing a piano, his skill causing the crowd to dance. After seeing a novelty mask of his face Duke realises rumours about his curse are spreading. Alice tells Duke a tale about a princess whose prince was imprisoned on the moon, so every year she sends him a kiss. Duke becomes depressed that even on a date he cannot touch Alice, but she assures him being close is enough. Later, Alice summons him to her room, and while she pretends it is for perverted reasons she just helps him relax so he can sleep. Duke invites her on a boat to watch a meteor shower but when she falls in he is unable to catch her. Alice demands a kiss, even if it kills her, but when he refuses she reveals it was a trick so she could tip him in the water as well. They miss the meteors and Duke is upset he couldn't tell Alice he loves her like he planned. Alice doesn't mind and tells him to try again at the next meteor shower in ten years.
4	4	"The Duke, Alice, and Memories of Snow"; Transliteration: "Botchan to Arisu to Yuki no Kioku" (Japanese: 坊ちゃんとアリスと雪の記憶)	Hideki Shirane	Kiyoko Sayama	July 25, 2021
Duke worries when Alice stops teasing him, but is relieved to discover she just has a cold. After she recovers Alice asks Duke to spend the day in the snow and gives him a scarf she knitted. Returning inside Alice notices she dropped an earring that belonged to her mother. Duke sneaks outside to locate it but passes out in the cold. A nearby bat transforms into a girl and helps him recover. When she discovers he is a noble helping a maid she decides he has potential, uses magic to find the earring and introduces herself as Cuff, a witch. Duke invites her inside where Alice is happy he found her earring. Cuff explains she distrusts humans as witch hunters killed her parents and being half-human witches avoid her so she never learned about curses. She reveals her friend might know something but when Duke suggests she seems to really like her friend based on how much she trusts him, she jumps out a window and vanishes. Alice reminisces about one of the last times Duke was able to touch her, defending her from bullies, and he claimed snow makes her look like a snow-fairy.
5	5	"The Duke, a Crow, and Ice Skating"; Transliteration: "Botchan to Karasu to Aisu Sukēto" (Japanese: 坊ちゃんと烏とアイススケート)	Kanae Muramoto	Kiyoko Sayama	August 1, 2021
Viola visits and declares Alice must learn how to make a cute face. Unfortunately Alice is already a master of appearing cute towards Duke whereas Viola embarrasses herself making a cute face at Rob. Viola insists on helping Alice cook but keeps getting distracted by Rob. She admits to being jealous Duke has people to support him through his curse and reminds him to find a cure before their younger brother becomes heir. Duke takes Alice ice skating and meets a white crow that transforms into a human named Zain, a magic user and Cuff's friend. Alice reveals she actually found Cuff in her bat form on the ice and helps her warm up. They decide to take part in ice skating where Duke becomes jealous Cuff and Zain can have physical contact, whereas Zain is jealous Duke and Alice can be honest about their feelings. Cuff decides to take Duke to the next Witches' Sabbath where Duke might locate the witch that cursed him. Viola decides to stay the night in Alice's room where they discuss love and Viola's desire for an older sister, since her mother tended to ignore her. Alice advises Duke to pay more attention to his sister in the future.
6	6	"The Duke, Alice, and a Night in the Witches' World"; Transliteration: "Botchan to Arisu to Makai no Ichiya" (Japanese: 坊ちゃんとアリスと魔界の一夜)	Hideki Shirane	Kiyoko Sayama	August 8, 2021
Duke realises that his conservatory is overgrown. Using his curse he kills the unnecessary plants then, despite them being dead, braids the flowers into a crown for Alice. A cat steals Alice's gown while she showers, forcing her to wear Duke's coat and allowing ample opportunities to tease him. They find the gown ruined, which upsets Alice as it was one Duke liked. She wears her uniform instead and Duke must refuse her invitation to shower together. Cuff and Zain take Duke and Alice to the Sabbath disguised as witches. Duke is surprised when the Sabbath turns out to be an administrative meeting lasting only 5 minutes. Daleth, the Sabbath leader, confronts Alice and Duke, revealing she only met Alice's mother once and also met Duke as a child. She also reveals the witch who cursed Duke is dead, but she had been a genius magic user so Duke's curse probably cannot ever be removed. She then burns their disguises, forcing them to flee. Duke wonders why Zain and Cuff helped them, so Cuff explains about his potential and promises their next visit will be as friends. Despite the bad news about his curse Duke is determined to find a cure.
7	7	"The Duke's and Alice's Uneventful Day"; Transliteration: "Botchan to Arisu no Nandemonai Ichinichi" (Japanese: 坊ちゃんとアリスのなんでもない一日)	Hideki Shirane	Kiyoko Sayama	August 15, 2021
Alice buys a witches pot to brew a potion that supposedly removes curses, but it does not work. Alice has Duke perform a song which if played perfectly can cure curses. Duke begins playing and is visited by the ghost of the songwriter who distracts Duke by trying to molest Alice, but Alice foils him. Duke finishes the song but the only curse lifted is the ghost who moves on, having heard his song played perfectly. Duke learns about the suspension bridge effect from Viola and decides to scare Alice, but Duke becomes terrified instead when he nearly curses a flower Rob has been cultivating for 50 years. Rob is actually grateful as jewelry belonging to Duke's grandmother, stolen by a maid decades ago, was hidden in the flowerpot and can now be returned. Duke and Alice wake up in a fantasy land, having been put in a magical sleep by a book on curing curses. Alice has Duke grope her breast, but as it is a dream Duke is disappointed he can't actually feel it. They spend all night trying to catch a white rabbit for a girl in a blue dress and decide to end the dream with a kiss, but Duke wakes up in his own library before they can.
8	8	"White Snow, Black Clothes"; Transliteration: "Shiroi Yuki, Kuroi Fuku" (Japanese: 白い雪、黒い服)	Hideki Shirane	Kiyoko Sayama	August 22, 2021
Cuff asks Duke to teach her to read and write to impress Zain. Walter, Duke's brother, is annoyed their mother still wants Duke as heir and that Viola prefers Duke over him, since Walter has a severe inferiority complex about being the younger brother. Viola visits Duke and encounters Cuff. She attempts to apprehend her as an intruder but is embarrassed when Rob sees her sat on top of another woman. During a snowstorm Alice reminisces about her first time at the mansion when Duke was younger, still depressed about his curse and would destroy entire rooms in the mansion from anger. At first he rejected Alice but having been his childhood friend she refused to leave him alone, so he set her a challenge, clean his bedroom he had destroyed in three days or be fired. Alice cleaned the room in a single night, so Duke ran away. After almost dying in the cold Alice found him and scolded him for trying to kill himself, knowing there would be people who would miss him, especially when she was alone and sick as a child he was the one who helped her feel better. Duke agreed to return to the mansion with her and realised he had begun to fall in love with her.
9	9	"The Duke, Alice, and the Christmas Eve Vow"; Transliteration: "Botchan to Arisu to Seiya no Chikai" (Japanese: 坊ちゃんとアリスと聖夜の誓い)	Hideki Shirane	Kiyotaka Ōhata	August 29, 2021
Viola decides to gift Rob a handkerchief at Duke's Christmas party. Walter illicitly follows Viola to Duke's mansion disguised as her driver. Zain reveals he may have feelings for Cuff and attempts to compliment her but Cuff falls asleep and it is uncertain if she heard him. Viola drops Rob's gift which is picked up by Walter as he sneaks in, hoping to see Duke depressed and alone. He disguises himself as Santa but is caught by Cuff who thinks he is the real Santa and tries to help by dropping him down the chimney. Duke is happy to see Walter as they have not seen each other in years. Walter confronts Duke about the unfairness of existing only as Duke's potential replacement. Duke settles an argument between Viola and Cuff over Rob's gift which Cuff mistakenly thought was her gift from Santa. Walter wagers with Duke that whoever discovers the cure to Duke's curse becomes the heir. Walter tries to leave but ends up stubbornly stuck outside in the snow, having remembered he is Viola's driver and can't leave without her. After the party Alice teases Duke with a request for a kiss under mistletoe, causing Duke to remember the first time he told Alice he loved her.
10	10	"The Duke, Alice, and a Song for Two"; Transliteration: "Botchan to Arisu to Futari Dake no Uta" (Japanese: 坊ちゃんとアリスと二人だけの歌)	Hideki Shirane	Kiyoko Sayama	September 5, 2021
Alice dreams about her mother, Sharon, maid to Duke's mother when Duke was young. Viola notices their mother is angry they missed Christmas dinner. Zain sends Cuff shopping alone after Viola criticised him for his habit of doting on her. Cuff manages the shopping but almost injures a young pickpocket, forcing Zain to revert to his habit of saving her. Duke has trouble sleeping so Alice decides to get in bed with him, except her sleeping nude makes his sleeplessness worse. She asks about his mother and Duke claims he would leave the family if she parted him from Alice. Alice is troubled Duke may be forced to choose between her or his family one day. Rob remembers being ordered to raise Duke away from the family, becoming a surrogate father, but blamed himself for Duke's isolation and depression, until he brought in Alice, someone close to Duke's age who has become precious to him. Duke asks Alice to sing while he plays The Owl and the Pussy-Cat on the piano, though they both end up embarrassed. Alice returns to her room despondent that, despite Duke's confidence, they will likely be parted when his curse is broken.
11	11	"The Duke and Secret Magic"; Transliteration: "Botchan to Himitsu no Mahō" (Japanese: 坊ちゃんと秘密の魔法)	Hideki Shirane	Kiyoko Sayama	September 12, 2021
Viola searches the family mansion for clues and finds a servant's logbook. Viola's mother forces her to start wearing dresses to prepare for marriage. Instead Viola moves in with Duke and reveals the logbook written by Alice's mother Sharon. Daleth spies on this and gives Zain a message. Alice discovers from the logbook two witches visited the mansion around when Duke was cursed, Daleth and another. Zain passes on the message that Duke should stay away from all witches, but Zain has no intention of obeying. Alice later overhears Duke telling Zain how much he loves her. Zain steals the logbook, intending to burn it after Daleth threatened Cuff, but when Duke catches him he feels guilty and returns the logbook, warning Duke it contains something secret about Daleth. Duke tells him to burn it for Cuff's safety, so instead Zain disintegrates it, telling Duke that Daleth is watching, but once she stops he can use his secret magic to restore the logbook from the single remaining piece. Daleth is satisfied the logbook is gone and ceases spying, but privately reveals she has Sharon's body in a coffin, though it is not revealed if she is dead or asleep. Duke is surprised to receive a letter from his mother summoning him to the main house for the first time in years.
12	12	"Together with the Duke..."; Transliteration: "Botchan to Issho ni......" (Japanese: 坊ちゃんと一緒に......)	Hideki Shirane	Yoshinobu Yamakawa	September 19, 2021
Duke sees his mother but she sends him to bed so they can talk in the morning. Duke is surprised when Viola claims Gerbera was actually in a good mood. Gerbera mistakes Alice for Sharon, whom she was good friends with, and becomes unexpectedly emotional. Viola takes Duke to the garden where the witch cursed him to love no-one, be loved by no-one and live a life of misery. Viola tells Duke she and Walter are jealous of Duke since at least he lives away from their mother. At dinner Gerbera explains that with their father terminally ill they must decide on the family heir and gives Duke until spring to break his curse or Walter will become heir. Duke gives an impassioned speech about his love for Alice but when Gerbera refuses to let him marry a maid he accuses her of treating her children like possessions before storming out. Privately, Gerbera is proud Duke was able to stand up to her. Duke returns home with Alice and tells her what he said to Gerbera, but he still wants to marry her no matter what. Alice waits for Duke to fall asleep before saying that she loves him too.

=== Season 2 (2023) ===
No. overall	No. in season	Title	Written by	Storyboarded by	Original release date
13	1	"The Duke, Alice, and the Magic Pool"; Transliteration: "Bocchan to Arisu to Mahō no Pūru" (Japanese: 坊ちゃんとアリスと魔法のプール)	Hideki Shirane	Yoshinobu Yamakawa	July 9, 2023
14	2	"The Duke, Golf and the Mysterious Beauty"; Transliteration: "Bocchan to Gorufu to Nazo no Bishōjo" (Japanese: 坊ちゃんとゴルフと謎の美少女)	Hideki Shirane	Yoshinobu Yamakawa	July 16, 2023
15	3	"The Duke, Alice, and the Spectral Bride"; Transliteration: "Bocchan to Arisu to Yūrei no Hanayome" (Japanese: 坊ちゃんとアリスと幽霊の花嫁)	Hideki Shirane	Kiyoko Sayama	July 23, 2023
16	4	"The Duke, Alice, and Circus 101"; Transliteration: "Bocchan to Arisu no Sākasu Nyūmon" (Japanese: 坊ちゃんとアリスのサーカス入門)	Mutsumi Ito	Kiyoko Sayama	July 30, 2023
17	5	"Cuff, Zain, and the Confession"; Transliteration: "Kafu to Zain to Kokuhaku to" (Japanese: カフとザインと告白と)	Mutsumi Ito	Yoshinobu Yamakawa	August 6, 2023
18	6	"The Duke and Everyone's Daily Life"; Transliteration: "Bocchan to Minna no Mainichi" (Japanese: 坊ちゃんとみんなの毎日)	Hideki Shirane	Kiyoko Sayama	August 13, 2023
19	7	"The Duke, Alice, and the Encounter in the Witches' World"; Transliteration: "Bocchan to Arisu to Makai no Deai" (Japanese: 坊ちゃんとアリスと魔界の出逢い)	Hideki Shirane	Kiyoko Sayama	August 20, 2023
20	8	"The Duke, Alice, and the Kissing Window"; Transliteration: "Botchan to Arisu to Kuchidzuke no Mado" (Japanese: 坊ちゃんとアリスと口づけの窓)	Hideki Shirane	Yoshinobu Yamakawa	August 27, 2023
21	9	"The Duke, Golf, and the Second Anniversary"; Transliteration: "Botchan to Arisu no Futatabime no Kinenbi" (Japanese: 坊ちゃんとアリスの二度目の記念日)	Hideki Shirane	Kiyoko Sayama	September 3, 2023
22	10	"The Duke, Alice, and the Flying Broom"; Transliteration: "Botchan to Arisu to Soratobu Hōki" (Japanese: 坊ちゃんとアリスと空飛ぶほうき)	Mutsumi Ito	Kiyoko Sayama	September 10, 2023
23	11	"The Duke, Alice, and the Wizardry School"; Transliteration: "Botchan to Arisu to Majutsu Gakkō" (Japanese: 坊ちゃんとアリスと魔術学校)	Hideki Shirane	Kiyoko Sayama	September 17, 2023
24	12	"The Duke, Alice, and the Curse Witch"; Transliteration: "Botchan to Arisu to Noroi no Majo" (Japanese: 坊ちゃんとアリスと呪いの魔女)	Hideki Shirane & Mutsumi Ito	Yoshinobu Yamakawa	September 24, 2023

=== Season 3 (2024) ===
No. overall	No. in season	Title	Written by	Storyboarded by	Original release date
25	1	"The Duke, Alice, and Reuniting With Mom"; Transliteration: "Bocchan to Arisu to Saikai no Haha" (Japanese: 坊ちゃんとアリスと再会の母)	Hideki Shirane	Kiyoko Sayama	April 7, 2024
26	2	"The Duke, Alice, and the Mysterious Clone"; Transliteration: "Bocchan to Arisu to Nazo no Bunshin" (Japanese: 坊ちゃんとアリスと謎の分身)	Mutsumi Itō	Kiyotaka Ōhata	April 14, 2024
27	3	"The Duke, Alice, and Mother and Mother"; Transliteration: "Bocchan to Arisu to Hahaoya to Hahaoya" (Japanese: 坊ちゃんとアリスと母親と母親)	Hideki Shirane	Kiyotaka Ōhata	April 21, 2024
28	4	"The Duke, Alice, and Sade's Love"; Transliteration: "Bocchan to Arisu to Shādē no Koi" (Japanese: 坊ちゃんとアリスとシャーデーの恋)	Hideki Shirane	Yoshinobu Yamakawa	April 28, 2024
29	5	"Dance Party (Part 1)"; Transliteration: "Butō-kai (Zen-pen)" (Japanese: 舞踏会（前編）)	Mutsumi Ito	Kiyotaka Ōhata	May 5, 2024
30	6	"Dance Party (Part 2)"; Transliteration: "Butō-kai (Kōhen)" (Japanese: 舞踏会（後編）)	Shirane Hideki	Seiko Sayama	May 12, 2024
31	7	"Coming Together"; Transliteration: "Shūketsu" (Japanese: 集結)	Mitsumi Itō	Kiyotaka Ōhata	May 19, 2024
32	8	"Persuasion"; Transliteration: "Settoku" (Japanese: 集結)	Hideki Shirane	Kiyotaka Ōhata	May 26, 2024
33	9	"Loneliness and Uncertainty"; Transliteration: "Kodoku to Madoi" (Japanese: 孤独と惑い)	Hideki Shirane	Seiko Sayama	June 2, 2024
34	10	"Victor's Grandson, Sharon's Daughter"; Transliteration: "Vikutoru no Mago, Sharon no Musume" (Japanese: ヴィクトルの孫、シャロンの娘)	Hideki Shirane	Seiko Sayama	June 9, 2024
35	11	"Friends, a Broken Curse, and Then..."; Transliteration: "Tomodachi, Kaiju, Soshite" (Japanese: 友達、解呪、そして)	Hideki Shirane	Yoshinobu Yamakawa	June 16, 2024
36	12	"The Duke of Death and His Maid"; Transliteration: "Shinigami Botchan to Kuro Meido" (Japanese: 死神坊ちゃんと黒メイド)	Hideki Shirane	Yoshinobu Yamakawa	June 23, 2024
