= Ruri =

- Pronunciation: Ru ree
- Gender: Female

Origin
- Origin: Japanese
- Meaning: It can have many different meanings depending on the kanji used.

Other names
- Related names: Ruriko; Koruri

Ruri is a Japanese feminine given name.

== Written forms ==
Ruri can be written using different kanji characters and can mean:

- truly
- genuine
- 瑠璃, "lapis lazuli"
- 琉璃, "lapis lazuli"

as a given name

- 瑠璃, "lapis lazuli"
- 流理, "current/flow, logic"
- 留莉, "detain, jasmine"
- 瑠里, "lapis lazuli, home

== People ==
- Ruri Aoi (葵 るり; born 2004), member of Japanese girl idol group ukka
- Ruri Mizutani (水谷 光里; born 1990), member of Japanese rock group Bon-Bon Blanco
- Ruri Kawamoto (川本 璃; born 1996), member of Japanese girl idol group f5ve

== Fictional characters ==
- Ruri (Dr. Stone), a character in the manga series Dr. Stone
- Hojo no Ruri (ルリ), a character in the manga series Onmyō Taisenki
- Ruri, a character in the PS2 video game Eureka Seven vol. 2: New Vision
- Ruri (瑠璃), the main character in the Japanese PS2 video game Ururun Quest: Koiyuuki
- Ruri Aoki (ルリ), the main character in the manga series RuriDragon
- Ruri Gokō (瑠璃), a character in the manga and anime series Oreimo
- Ruri Himeyuri (瑠璃), a character in the anime series To Heart 2
- Ruri Hoshino (ルリ), a character in the anime series Martian Successor Nadesico
- Ruri Mihashi (瑠里), a character in the baseball manga series Big Windup!
- Ruri Saiki (翠雀), a character in the manga and anime series Angel Sanctuary
- Ruri Saionji (瑠璃), a character in the manga series Hot Gimmick
- Ruri Sarasa (ルリ), the main protagonist of the manga series Tokyo Underground
- Ruri Kurosaki/Lulu Obsidian (瑠璃), a character in the anime series Yu-Gi-Oh! Arc-V
- Ruri Hibirgaoka (雲雀丘 瑠璃), a main character in the anime series Anne Happy
- Ruri Miyamoto (宮本 るり, Miyamoto Ruri), a character in the manga and anime series Nisekoi
- Ruri (琉璃), a movie-only character exclusive to Inuyasha the Movie: Affections Touching Across Time
- Ruri Hazakura (葉桜 瑠璃), a character in the light novel series Agents of the Four Seasons
- Ruri Tanigawa (谷川 瑠璃), a character in the manga and anime series Ruri Rocks

== See also ==
- Ruri no Ame, a song by Alice Nine
- Ruri no Shima, a Japanese TV drama also known as Ruri's Island
- Yoake Mae yori Ruriiro na, a Japanese adult visual novel video game
