= Miyari Nemoto =

Japanese voice actress

- 根本 京里
- Born: 22 May
- Occupation: Voice actor
- Years active: 2019–present
- Employer: Aoni Production
- Notable work: In the Heart of Kunoichi Tsubaki as Sazanka; Alice Gear Aegis Expansion as Nodoka Takahata; Ruri Rocks as Ruri Tanigawa
- Spouse: Kōji Yusa (m. 2026)

Miyari Nemoto (根本 京里, Nemoto Miyari; born 22 May) is a Japanese voice actress from Ibaraki Prefecture, affiliated with Aoni Production. She starred as Sazanka in In the Heart of Kunoichi Tsubaki, Nodoka Takahata in Alice Gear Aegis Expansion, and Ruri Tanigawa in Ruri Rocks.

== Biography ==
Miyari Nemoto, a native of Ibaraki Prefecture, was born on 22 May. Her father made several VHS recordings of anime and movies for her to watch, and she developed an admiration for Kekkaishi character Tokine Yukimura to the point of growing long hair. She wanted to be an animator or voice actress when she was in high school, but she did not have good drawing skills and "thought there was no way to become [the latter]", so she decided to become a kindergarten teacher. After moving to Tokyo to attend university, she later reconsidered voice acting after receiving encouragement from a lecturer at the university, and attended Tohokushinsha Eizo Techno Academia Department of Voice Acting in parallel with university.

In 2019, she worked as the Tuesday personality for Maji! Anirabu. Her anime debut was in GeGeGe no Kitarō. In September 2022, she was cast in her first main role as Sazanka in In the Heart of Kunoichi Tsubaki; although she was initially anxious and considered early retirement if she was unsatisfied with her roles, she reconsidered after being cast in the role. In 2023, she starred as Nodoka Takahata in Alice Gear Aegis Expansion; she later recalled in a 2024 interview that when she was acting as Nodoka, she could not tell the difference between herself and the character. In 2024, it was announced that she would appear in Sakamoto Days as Piisuke.

Her hobbies are running and nail art, and her special skills are electric bass and skiing. She practices judo and is a shodan in the sport.

On October 15, 2026, Nemoto announced her marriage to voice actor Kōji Yusa.

== Filmography ==
=== Animated television ===
Year	Title	Role(s)	Ref.
2019	GeGeGe no Kitarō	Female announcer, etc.	
2020	A Certain Scientific Railgun	Enemy school girl	
2020	Assault Lily Bouquet	Sayu Tachihara	
2020	Attack on Titan	Tybur children	
2020	Chibi Maruko-chan	Tea shop owner	
2020	Fly Me to the Moon	Kindergarten girl	
2020	Fruits Basket	Boy C	
2020	Kaguya-sama: Love Is War	Female student	
2020	One Piece	Geisha C, etc.	
2021	Combatants Will Be Dispatched!	Mer-chan	
2021	Digimon Ghost Game	High school girl 1	
2021	World Trigger	System voice	
2022	BanG Dream! Morfonication	Classmate A	
2022	In the Heart of Kunoichi Tsubaki	Sazanka	
2023	A Girl & Her Guard Dog	Harazaki	
2023	Alice Gear Aegis Expansion	Nodoka Takahata	
2023	Classroom for Heroes	Levia	
2023	Ippon Again!	Nene Koide	
2023	The Dangers in My Heart	Schoolgirl B	
2023	The Duke of Death and His Maid	Fifa	
2023	Undead Unluck	Miko Forgeil	
2024	Tis Time for "Torture," Princess	Octopus	
2024	Villainess Level 99	Diva	
2025	Honey Lemon Soda	Ayumi Endo	
2025	Sakamoto Days	Piisuke	
2025	Ruri Rocks	Ruri Tanigawa	
2026	Ichijyoma Mankitsu Gurashi!	Neo Nakano	
2026	My Stepmother and Stepsisters Aren't Wicked	Yaeko Kōzō	
2026	Magical Sisters LuluttoLilly	Asahi Araki	
2026	I'm Looking for Zombies	Aki	
2027	Kagurabachi	Char Kyonagi	
TBA	The Fake Alchemist	Nora	

=== Animated film ===
Year	Title	Role(s)	Ref.
2020	Pokémon the Movie: Secrets of the Jungle	Announcer	
2021	Macross Delta the Movie: Absolute Live!!!!!!		
2021	Macross Frontier: Labyrinth of Time		
2021	My Hero Academia: World Heroes' Mission		

=== Original net animation ===
Year	Title	Role(s)	Ref.
2021	Baki the Grappler	Assistant	
2021	Ganbare Doukichan	Girl	
2021	Pokémon Evolutions	Pikachu (male), Goddess of Peace	
2022	Pokémon: Hisuian Snow	Children	
2023	Pluto	Children	

=== Video games ===
Year	Title	Role(s)	Ref.
2020	Kemono Friends 3	Red Panda	
2022	Assault Lily: Last Bullet	Sayu Tachihara	
2022	Heaven Burns Red	Chie Sugawara	
2023	Alice Gear Aegis	Nodoka Takahata	
2023	Blue Archive	Reisa Uzawa	
2024	Umamusume: Pretty Derby	Samson Big	
