= List of Is It Wrong to Try to Pick Up Girls in a Dungeon? episodes =

Is It Wrong to Try to Pick Up Girls in a Dungeon? is a Japanese anime series adapted by J.C.Staff from the light novel series of the same name written by Fujino Ōmori and illustrated by Suzuhito Yasuda. Crunchyroll has streamed the series internationally. Sentai Filmworks has licensed the anime for digital and home video release in North America with an English dub released in March 2017. The first original video animation was released on December 7, 2016. A second season of the anime was announced on February 18, 2018, during the GA Bunko 2018 Happyō Stage at Wonder Festival. The second season aired from July 13 to September 28, 2019. Hideki Tachibana replaced Yoshiki Yamakawa as the director of the second season. The rest of the cast and staff reprised their roles. HIDIVE streamed a Dubcast for the second season.

A third season of the anime series and an OVA episode were both announced on September 27, 2019. The second OVA episode was released on January 29, 2020. The third season was originally scheduled to start broadcasting in July 2020, but the anime production committee delayed the broadcast to "October or later" due to the effects of COVID-19. On July 4, 2020, it was announced that the third season was rescheduled to broadcast in October 2020. The third season aired from October 3 to December 19, 2020, and ran for 12 episodes. On December 18, 2020, a third OVA episode was announced, which was released on April 28, 2021.

A fourth season of the anime series was announced at GA FES 2021 on January 31, 2021. The main staff from previous seasons are reprising their roles. Fujino Ōmori, the original author, was supervised the scripts alongside Hideki Shirane. The fourth season premiered on July 23, 2022, with the first half of the season aired till September 29, 2022, and the second half (titled DanMachi IV Deep Chapter: Calamity Arc) which aired from January 7 to March 18, 2023. (Note: Episodes are released on select platforms 2 days before their original air date on television.)

A fifth season of the anime was announced at an event celebrating the 10th anniversary of the light novels in November 2023. It aired from October 5, 2024, to March 7, 2025.

A sixth season of the anime series was announced at Aedes Vesta event on February 7, 2026.

== Series overview ==
Season	Episodes		Originally released	
Season	Episodes		First released	Last released
1	13		April 4, 2015	June 27, 2015
2	12		July 13, 2019	September 28, 2019
3	12		October 3, 2020	December 19, 2020
4	22	11	July 23, 2022	October 1, 2022
4	22	11	January 7, 2023	March 18, 2023
5	15		October 5, 2024	March 7, 2025

== Episodes ==
=== Season 1 (2015) ===
No. overall	No. in season	Title	Directed by	Written by	Original release date
1	1	"Adventurer (Bell Cranel)"; Transliteration: "Bōkensha (Beru Kuraneru)" (Japanese: 冒険者(ベル・クラネル))	Daisuke Takashima	Hideki Shirane	April 4, 2015
2	2	"Monster Festival (Monsterphilia)"; Transliteration: "Kaibutsu-sai (Monsutāfiria)" (Japanese: 怪物祭(モンスターフィリア))	Toshikazu Hashimoto	Hideki Shirane	April 11, 2015
3	3	"The Blade of a God (Hestia Knife)"; Transliteration: "Kamisama no Yaiba (Hesutia Naifu)" (Japanese: 神様の刃(ヘスティア・ナイフ))	Katsushi Sakurabi	Hideki Shirane	April 18, 2015
4	4	"The Weak (Supporter)"; Transliteration: "Jakusha (Sapōtā)" (Japanese: 弱者(サポーター))	Daisuke Takashima	Ayumu Hisao	April 25, 2015
5	5	"Magic Book (Grimoire)"; Transliteration: "Madōsho (Gurimoa)" (Japanese: 魔導書(グリモア))	Kiyoko Sayama	Ayumu Hisao	May 2, 2015
6	6	"Reason (Liliruca Arde)"; Transliteration: "Riyū (Ririruka Āde)" (Japanese: 理由(リリルカ・アーデ))	Risako Yoshida	Hideki Shirane	May 9, 2015
7	7	"Sword Princess (Ais Wallenstein)"; Transliteration: "Kenki (Aizu Varenshutain)" (Japanese: 剣姫(アイズ・ヴァレンシュタイン))	Toshikazu Hashimoto	Ayumu Hisao	May 16, 2015
8	8	"Wanting to Be a Hero (Argonaut)"; Transliteration: "Eiyū Ganbō (Arugonōto)" (Japanese: 英雄願望(アルゴノゥト))	Naoyuki Kon'no	Hideki Shirane	May 23, 2015
9	9	"Blacksmith (Welf Crozzo)"; Transliteration: "Kajishi (Verufu Kurozzo)" (Japanese: 鍛冶師(ヴェルフ・クロッゾ))	Kiyoko Sayama	Shōgo Yasukawa	May 30, 2015
10	10	"Procession of Monsters (Pass Parade)"; Transliteration: "Kaibutsu Shintei (Pasu Parēdo)" (Japanese: 怪物進呈(パス・パレード))	Katsushi Sakurabi	Hideki Shirane	June 6, 2015
11	11	"Labyrinth Utopia (Under Resort)"; Transliteration: "Meikyū no Rakuen (Andā Rizōto)" (Japanese: 迷宮の楽園(アンダーリゾート))	Daisuke Takashima	Ayumu Hisao	June 13, 2015
12	12	"Evil Intentions (Show)"; Transliteration: "Akui (Shō)" (Japanese: 悪意(ショー))	Daisuke Takashima; Kiyoko Sayama	Shōgo Yasukawa	June 20, 2015
13	13	"The Story of a Familia (Familia Myth)"; Transliteration: "Kenzoku no Monogatari (Famiria Mīsu)" (Japanese: 眷族の物語(ファミリア・ミィス))	Katsushi Sakurabi; Yoshinobu Yamakawa	Hideki Shirane	June 27, 2015

Sword Oratoria (2017)

Is It Wrong to Try to Pick Up Girls in a Dungeon? On the Side: Sword Oratoria is a spin-off series that focuses on the character Ais Wallenstein. One season of anime has been produced, which runs parallel to Season 1 of the parent anime, retold from the perspective of the Loki Familia.

=== Season 2 (2019) ===
No. overall (Note: The story takes place after the events of the film, Arrow of the Orion.)	No. in season	Title	Directed by	Written by	Original release date
14	1	"Banquet of the Gods (Party)"; Transliteration: "Kami no utage (Pātī)" (Japanese: 神の宴(パーティー))	Hideki Tachibana	Hideki Shirane	July 13, 2019
15	2	"Sun God (Apollo)"; Transliteration: "Taiyō-shin (Aporon)" (Japanese: 太陽神(アポロン))	Kōzō Kaihō	Hideki Shirane	July 20, 2019
16	3	"Gathering (Conversion)"; Transliteration: "Shūketsu (Konbājon)" (Japanese: 集結(コンバージョン))	Toshikazu Hashimoto	Hideki Shirane	July 27, 2019
17	4	"War Game (War Game)"; Transliteration: "Sensō yūgi (Wō Gēmu)" (Japanese: 戦争遊戯(ウォーゲーム))	Katsushi Sakurabi	Shōgo Yasukawa	August 3, 2019
18	5	"The Hearthfire Mansion (Home)"; Transliteration: "Kamadobi no yakata (Hōmu)" (Japanese: 竈火の館(ホーム))	Yoshihiro Mori	Mamoru Akinaga	August 10, 2019
19	6	"City of Lust (Ishtar Familia)"; Transliteration: "Injato (Ishutaru Famiria)" (Japanese: 淫都(イシュタル・ファミリア))	Hideki Tachibana	Hideki Shirane	August 17, 2019
20	7	"Fox Person (Renard)"; Transliteration: "Kitsunejin (Runāru)" (Japanese: 狐人(ルナール))	Kōzō Kaihō	Shōgo Yasukawa	August 24, 2019
21	8	"Killing Stone (Ephemeral Dreams)"; Transliteration: "Sesshōseki (Uta Katano Yume)" (Japanese: 殺生石(ウタカタノユメ))	Toshikazu Hashimoto	Mamoru Akinaga	August 31, 2019
22	9	"War Prostitutes (Berbera)"; Transliteration: "Sentō shōfu (Bābera)" (Japanese: 戦闘娼婦(バーベラ))	Yūsuke Onoda	Hideki Shirane	September 7, 2019
23	10	"Longing to Be a Hero (Argonaut)"; Transliteration: "Eiyū setsubō (Arugonouto)" (Japanese: 英雄切望(アルゴノゥト))	Katsushi Sakurabi	Shōgo Yasukawa	September 14, 2019
24	11	"Army's Advance (Rakia)"; Transliteration: "Shingun (Rakia)" (Japanese: 進軍(ラキア))	Yoshihiro Mori	Mamoru Akinaga	September 21, 2019
25	12	"Goddess and Child (Song of Love)"; Transliteration: "Megami to kenzoku (Ai no uta)" (Japanese: 女神と眷族(アイノウタ))	Kōzō Kaihō	Hideki Shirane	September 28, 2019

=== Season 3 (2020) ===
No. overall	No. in season	Title	Directed by	Written by	Original release date
26	1	"Wiene (Dragon's Daughter)"; Transliteration: "Uīne (Ryū no Shōjo)" (Japanese: 竜の少女(ウィーネ))	Hideki Tachibana	Hideki Shirane	October 3, 2020
27	2	"Monster (One Wing)"; Transliteration: "Monsutā (Kata-yoku)" (Japanese: 片翼(モンスター))	Kōhei Kuratomi	Hideki Shirane	October 10, 2020
28	3	"Xenos (Outliers)"; Transliteration: "Zenosu (Itanji)" (Japanese: 異端児(ゼノス))	Yoshihiro Mori	Mamoru Akinaga	October 17, 2020
29	4	"Aspiration (Distant Dream)"; Transliteration: "Akogare (Tōi Yume)" (Japanese: 遠い夢(アコガレ))	Kazuma Satō	Hideki Shirane	October 24, 2020
30	5	"Ikelos Familia (King of Atrocity)"; Transliteration: "Ikerosu Famiria (Sangeki no Ōja)" (Japanese: 惨劇の王者(イケロス・ファミリア))	Hitomi Ezoe	Ayumu Hisao	October 31, 2020
31	6	"Knossos (Man-Made Labyrinth)"; Transliteration: "Kunossosu (Jinzō Meikyū)" (Japanese: 人造迷宮(クノッソス))	Yūsuke Onoda	Ayumu Hisao	November 7, 2020
32	7	"Dix Perdix (The Dreams of Beasts)"; Transliteration: "Dikkusu Perudikusu (Kemono no Yume)" (Japanese: 獣の夢(ディックス・ペルディクス))	Yoshiyuki Nogami	Hideki Shirane	November 14, 2020
33	8	"Bell Cranel (The Fool)"; Transliteration: "Beru Kuraneru (Gusha)" (Japanese: 愚者(ベル・クラネル))	Kazuma Satō	Ayumu Hisao	November 21, 2020
34	9	"Stigma (Downfall)"; Transliteration: "Sutiguma (Reiraku)" (Japanese: 零落(スティグマ))	Yoshihiro Mori	Hideki Shirane	November 28, 2020
35	10	"Invisible (Forced Breakthrough)"; Transliteration: "Inbijiburu (Kyōkō Toppa)" (Japanese: 強行突破(インビジブル))	Yoshiyuki Nogami	Shōgo Yasukawa	December 5, 2020
36	11	"Ultra Soul (Decisive Battle)"; Transliteration: "Urutora Sōru (Kessen)" (Japanese: 決戦(ウルトラソウル))	Katsushi Sakurabi	Shōgo Yasukawa	December 12, 2020
37	12	"Argonaut (Hero's Return)"; Transliteration: "Arugonouto (Eiyū Kaiki)" (Japanese: 英雄回帰(アルゴノゥト))	Hiroshi Nishikiori	Hideki Shirane	December 19, 2020

=== Season 4 (2022–23) ===
No. overall	No. in season	Title	Directed by	Written by	Original release date
Part 1
38	1	"Prelude (Night Before Departure)"; Transliteration: "Pureryūdo (Shuppatsu Zenya)" (Japanese: 出発前夜(プレリュード))	Hideki Tachibana, Yoshiyuki Nogami	Hideki Shirane	July 23, 2022
39	2	"The Great Falls (The Great Falls)"; Transliteration: "Gurēto Fōru (Kyo Ao no Taki)" (Japanese: 巨蒼の滝(グレート・フォール))	Yûsuke Onoda	Hideki Shirane	July 30, 2022
40	3	"Parasite (Viscum Album)"; Transliteration: "Yadorigi (Kisei)" (Japanese: 寄生(ヤドリギ))	Yoshihiro Mori	Hideki Shirane	August 6, 2022
41	4	"Mermaid (The Girl of Water City)"; Transliteration: "Māmeido (Mizu To no Shōjo)" (Japanese: 水都の少女(マーメイド))	Yoshiyuki Nogami	Hideki Shirane	August 13, 2022
42	5	"Argo Vesta (Heroic Slash of Holy Flame)"; Transliteration: "Arugo Wesuta (Seika no Eiki)" (Japanese: 聖火の英斬(アルゴ・ウェスタ))	Shigeru Ueda	Hideki Shirane	August 20, 2022
43	6	"Rabbit's Foot (Rabbit's Foot)"; Transliteration: "Rabitto Futto (Hakuto no Ashi)" (Japanese: 白兎の脚(ラビット・フット))	Kazuma Satō	Hideki Shirane	August 27, 2022
44	7	"Cassandra Ilion (Dream Seer)"; Transliteration: "Kasandora Irion (Yochi Yume)" (Japanese: 予知夢(カサンドラ・イリオン))	Miyuki Ishida, Kouzou Kaihou	Shogo Yasukawa	September 3, 2022
45	8	"Mirabilis (Chaos)"; Transliteration: "Mirabirisu (Konmei)" (Japanese: 混迷(ミラビリス))	Yûsuke Onoda	Miya Asakawa	September 10, 2022
46	9	"Lambton (Ill Omen)"; Transliteration: "Ramuton (Kyōchō)" (Japanese: 凶兆(ラムトン))	Yoshihiro Mori	Miya Asakawa	September 17, 2022
47	10	"Juggernaut (The Destroyer)"; Transliteration: "Jagānōto (Hakaisha)" (Japanese: 破壊者(ジャガーノート))	Shigeru Ueda	Shogo Yasukawa	September 24, 2022
48	11	"Endless (Brutal)"; Transliteration: "Endoresu (Kakoku)" (Japanese: 過酷(エンドレス))	Kazuma Satō, Tetsuro Tanaka	Shogo Yasukawa	October 1, 2022
Part 2
49	12	"Amphisbaena (A Song of Despair)"; Transliteration: "Anfisubaena (Zetsubō no Uta)" (Japanese: 絶望の詩(アンフィス・バエナ))	Miyuki Ishida, Tetsuro Tanaka	Hideki Shirane	January 7, 2023
50	13	"Morgue (Victim)"; Transliteration: "Morugu (Gisei)" (Japanese: 犠牲(モルグ))	Akira Tanaka	Miya Asakawa	January 14, 2023
51	14	"Daphne Lauros (Friend)"; Transliteration: "Dafune Raurosu (Tomo)" (Japanese: 友(ダフネ・ラウロス))	Yoshiyuki Nogami	Masato Hori	January 21, 2023
52	15	"Ignis (Flame)"; Transliteration: "Igunisu (Furei)" (Japanese: 不冷(イグニス))	Mitsuo Hashimoto	Shogo Yasukawa	January 28, 2023
53	16	"Welf Crozzo (Shikou)"; Transliteration: "Werufu Kurozzo (Shikō)" (Japanese: 始高(ヴェルフ・クロッゾ))	Yoshihiro Mori	Hideki Shirane	February 4, 2023
54	17	"White Palace (White Labyrinth)"; Transliteration: "Howaito Paresu (Shiro no Meikyū)" (Japanese: 白の迷宮(ホワイトパレス))	Yūsuke Onoda	Miya Asakawa	February 11, 2023
55	18	"Desperate (Dungeon Do-or-Die Time)"; Transliteration: "Desuparēto (Meikyū Kesshi Kudari)" (Japanese: 迷宮決死行(デスパレート))	Katsushi Sakurabi	Masato Hori	February 18, 2023
56	19	"Colosseum (Combat Arena)"; Transliteration: "Koroshiamu (Sentō Arīna)" (Japanese: 戦闘アリーナ(コロシアム))	Shigeru Ueda	Miya Asakawa	February 25, 2023
57	20	"Astrea Familia (Heroic Death)"; Transliteration: "Asutorea Famirī (Eiyū-teki Shi)" (Japanese: 英雄的死(アストレアファミリー))	Hideki Tachibana	Hideki Shirane	March 4, 2023
58	21	"Daydream (A Sweet Lie)"; Transliteration: "Deidorīmu (Yasashī Uso)" (Japanese: 優しい嘘(デイドリーム))	Kazuma Satō	Shōgo Yasukawa	March 11, 2023
59	22	"Luvia (Starry Flower)"; Transliteration: "Ruvia (Hoshi Hana)" (Japanese: 星華(ルヴィア))	Shigeru Ueda	Hideki Shirane	March 18, 2023

=== Season 5 (2024–25) ===
No. overall	No. in season	Title	Directed by	Written by	Storyboarded by	Original release date
60	1	"Syr"; Transliteration: "Shiru" (Japanese: シル)	Hideki Tachibana	Hideki Shirane	Hideki Tachibana	October 5, 2024
61	2	"(Master) Training"; Transliteration: "(Masutā) Chōkyō" (Japanese: 調教(マスター))	Shigeru Ueda	Hideki Shirane	Hideki Tachibana	October 12, 2024
62	3	"(Odr) Partner"; Transliteration: "(Ōzu) Hanryo" (Japanese: 伴侶(オーズ))	Momo Shimizu	Miya Asakawa	Hideki Tachibana	October 19, 2024
63	4	"(Seidr) God and Girl"; Transliteration: "(Seizu) Kami to Musume" (Japanese: 神と娘(セイズ))	Yoshihiro Mori	Hideki Shirane	Hideki Tachibana	October 26, 2024
64	5	"(Freya Familia) Invasion"; Transliteration: "(Fureiya Famiria) Shinryaku" (Japanese: 侵略(フレイヤ・ファミリア))	Momo Shimizu	Hideki Shirane	Toshihiko Masuda	November 2, 2024
65	6	"(Orario) Distorted City"; Transliteration: "(Orario) Waikyoku Toshi" (Japanese: 歪曲都市(オラリオ))	Shigeru Ueda	Shōgo Yasukawa	Toshihiko Masuda	November 9, 2024
66	7	"(Loneliness) Separated"; Transliteration: "(Ronrinesu) Betsuri" (Japanese: 別離(ロンリネス))	Yūsuke Onoda	Miya Asakawa	Yūichi Nihei	November 16, 2024
67	8	"(Bell Cranel) Desires"; Transliteration: "(Beru Kuraneru) Dōkei" (Japanese: 憧憬(ベル・クラネル))	Momo Shimizu	Hideki Shirane	Katsushi Sakurabi & Teppei Okuda	November 23, 2024
68	9	"(Vesta) Altar of the Sacred Flame"; Transliteration: "(Uesuta) Seika no Saidan" (Japanese: 聖火の祭壇(ウェスタ))	Shigeru Ueda	Hideki Shirane	Jun Yamamoto	December 7, 2024
69	10	"(War Game) The Great Faction Battle"; Transliteration: "(Wō Gēmu) Habatsu Taisen" (Japanese: 派閥大戦(ウォーゲーム))	Yoshihiro Mori	Miya Asakawa	Kiyotaka Ohata	December 14, 2024
70	11	"(Fólkvangr) Hell"; Transliteration: "(Fōrukuvuangu) Jigoku" (Japanese: 地獄(フォールクヴァング))	Momo Shimizu	Shōgo Yasukawa	Momo Shimizu	December 21, 2024
71	12	"(Astrea Record) Inheritance"; Transliteration: "(Asutorea Rekōdo) Keishō" (Japanese: 継承(アストレア・レコード))	Hideki Tachibana	Hideki Shirane	Hideki Tachibana	February 14, 2025 (Note: Earliest episode release on BS11)
72	13	"(Revenge) Counterattack"; Transliteration: "(Ribenji) Gyakushū" (Japanese: 逆襲(リベンジ))	Yūsuke Onoda	Shōgo Yasukawa	Toshihiko Masuda	February 21, 2025
73	14	"(Einherjar) The Warriors of the Goddess"; Transliteration: "(Einheriyaru) Megami no Yūshi Tachi" (Japanese: 女神の勇士達(エインヘリヤル))	Shigeru Ueda	Hideki Shirane	Katsushi Sakurabi	February 28, 2025
74	15	"(Syr) First Love"; Transliteration: "(Shiru) Hatsukoi" (Japanese: 初恋(シル))	Shigeru Ueda	Hideki Shirane	Jun Yamamoto, Toshihiko Masuda & Hideki Tachibana	March 7, 2025

== OVAs (2016–21) ==
No.	Title	Directed by	Written by	Storyboarded by	Original release date
1	"Is It Wrong to Expect a Hot Spring in a Dungeon?"; Transliteration: "Danjon ni Onsen o Motomeru no wa Machigatteiru Darō ka?" (Japanese: ダンジョンに温泉を求めるのは間違っているだろうか)	Yōhei Suzuki	Hideki Shirane	Yōhei Suzuki	December 7, 2016
On the way back from the 18th floor, Bell and the party accidentally stumble across a hidden, mythical hot spring (one Mikoto is especially excited about), and decide to take the time to rest in it. Hermes uses this opportunity to cause some trouble, at Asfi and the other girls' chagrin. While exploring other parts of the spring, Hestia comes across a room where she can finally be alone with Bell. Suddenly, the hot spring starts to turn red and burns off everyone's swimsuits. After Bell and Hestia are chased off by monsters and rescued by Ryuu, they face off against the spring's protector, a giant angler fish, which Bell quickly dispatches. Now realizing the hot spring was just a monster trap, they plan to report it to the Guild, and head out to go back home.
2	"Is It Wrong to go Searching for Herbs on a Deserted Island?"; Transliteration: "Mujintō de hābu o sagashi ni iku no wa machigatte imasu ka?" (Japanese: 無人島でハーブを探しに行くのは間違っていますか)	Yūsuke Onoda	Hideki Shirane	Kiyotaka Ohata	January 29, 2020
Miach sends the Hestia familia (plus Ryuu) on a quest to recover some medicinal herbs on "Paradise Island", which would also double as a vacation for them. Hestia and Lili (also Haruhime) fight over who should spend time beside Bell and choose to decide it with a swimsuit competition. The girls each show off their swimsuits, flustering Bell, and when he's asked to pick the winner, they are suddenly surprised by the appearance of Ais, sprouting a mushroom from her head. Acting uncharacteristically cheery, the others figure she has amnesia, and to help her they'll need to find the fabled "Everything Flower" hidden at the centre of the island, which can grant the holder's deepest desires. While some head out to look for it, Ais believes she was in love with Welf, thanks to Hestia, causing Bell to run off traumatized, where he falls off a cliff and is knocked unconscious. Ryuu seemingly finds the "Everything Flower" in the middle of a lake, but when she goes to retrieve it, she screams. Mikoto and Welf each separately go to look for her, this time finding the "Everything Flower" in a hot spring, and a forge on the lake, respectively. The three return, sprouting the same mushrooms on their head, as well as the same ditsy persona as Ais. Hestia, Lili, and Haruhime plan to save them, but fall victim as well. Bell wakes up to find all of his companions stuck in the same hypnotic trance. They eventually pass out, with the mushrooms falling off and transforming into their respective hosts. They tell him now that they've turned into mushroom people they need Bell to protect them and take them back to Orario, which he agrees to. Suddenly, several other characters, including Finn, Bete, Aisha, even Apollo, and Ares, appear to try and fight the mushrooms, when a volcano out of nowhere emerges, destroying the island. It is revealed to have been a dream from Cassandra, who tries to warn Daphne and Micah to no avail, learning from Naaza they had already left for the island several days ago and should be returning soon. Bell arrives in the shop, sprouting a mushroom on his head, to Cassandra's horror.
3	"Is It Wrong to Try to Find a Hot Spring in Orario? -Bath God Forever-"; Transliteration: "Orario ni Onsen o Motomeru no wa Machigatteiru Darō ka (Ofuru no Kami-sama Fōebā)" (Japanese: オラリオに温泉を求めるのは間違っているだろうか ～おふろの神様フォーエバー～)	Yoshiyuki Nogami	Hideki Shirane	Kiyotaka Ohata	April 28, 2021
Dian Cecht opens up a bath house in Orario which becomes a huge hit. However, Miach Familia is annoyed due to him stealing the idea from Naaza, with her also believing that his proclamation that it is also a natural hot spring to be a lie. After venting their issues to an exasperated Bell, an eavesdropping Hermes appears and volunteers his services to investigate the place. They learn that it is nearly identical to Naaza's plans, and despite Naaza's initial insistence on doing things herself so they don't get in trouble, the others agree to help sneak in and learn the truth. A disguised Bell, Hermes, and Welf, who learnt of the situation, cause a distraction running around the women's bath, while Miach Familia head to the boiler room. As the boys split up, Bell comes across a bridge, accidentally falling onto a naked Syr, and plummets to the lake below. Miach Familia is forced to face against Dian Cecht's defence system, sprinklers that shoot out liquid that disintegrate clothes. Eventually, Miach and Naaza make their way through and face off against Dian Cecht wielding a laser sword, who accidentally cuts one of the pipes, causing an eruption and inadvertently freeing a trapped Bell. The three soon arrive at the core, where they learn that the source of the hot spring is actually Dian Cecht Familia member, and healer, Airmid's bath water, which embarrasses her so much the entire hot spring explodes. In the aftermath, everyone enjoys the remaining pools of hot spring left over, while an embarrassed Eina, who learnt of Bell's incident from Syr, brutally punishes him.
