= Samson Big =

Japanese Thoroughbred racehorse (foaled 1991)

Samson Big; サムソンビッグ
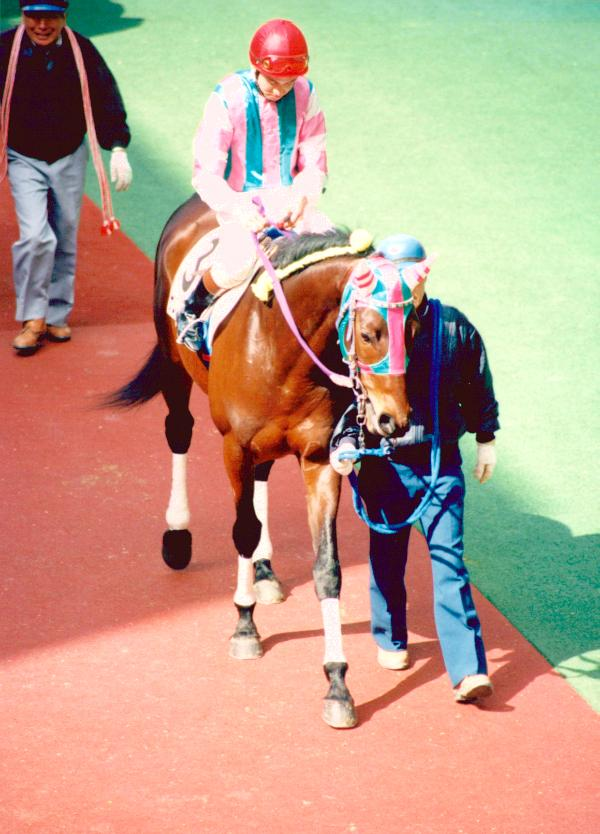
- Samson Big
- Breed: Thoroughbred
- Sire: Sakura Shori (JPN)
- Grandsire: Partholon (IRE)
- Dam: Shunichi Okan (JPN)
- Damsire: Floribunda (GB)
- Sex: Stallion
- Foaled: April 14, 1991
- Died: Unknown
- Country: Japan
- Colour: Bay
- Breeder: Samson Farm
- Owner: Yoshiko Tanaka
- Trainer: Yukiharu Shikato
- Jockey: Kazuya Nakatake; Yūichi Shikato; Hidetaka Tadokoro; Takahito Kikuzawa; Junichi Serizawa; Sadahiko Kojima; Shogo Kikuchi; Yutaka Take; Seiki Tabara; Kunihiko Watanabe; Masayoshi Ebina; Teruhiko Chida; Takaya Ueno
- Record: 35: 4-4-3
- Earnings: ¥109,346,000

Major wins
- Kisaragi Sho (1994)

Samson Big (Japanese: サムソンビッグ, Samuson Biggu; foaled 14 April 1991) was a Japanese Thoroughbred racehorse who competed on flat and steeplechase races. He recorded four wins from thirty-five starts between 1993 and 1997, most notably the Kisaragi Sho (GIII) in 1994. He is best known for being one of only two horses, alongside the Triple Crown winner Narita Brian, to contest all three legs of the Japanese Triple Crown in 1994.

== Background ==
Samson Big was a bay horse bred in Monbetsu, Hokkaido, by Samson Farm. He was sired by Sakura Shori, and his dam was Shunichi Okan, a mare by Floribunda. He was owned by Yoshiko Tanaka, wife of the founder of the Meganesuper eyewear chain, and trained by Yukiharu Shikato at the JRA's Ritto Training Center.

== Racing career ==
=== 1993: two-year-old season ===
Samson Big debuted on 10 July 1993 in a 2-year-old newcomer race over 1000 metres on dirt at Sapporo Racecourse, winning by 0.8 seconds. He then finished unplaced in the Sapporo Sansai Stakes (GIII) and fifth in the Clover Stakes. On 26 September, he contested the Hakodate Sansai Stakes (GIII) at Hakodate Racecourse, finishing second to Marie God and finishing ahead of the future Triple Crown winner Narita Brian, who finished sixth. After a third-place finish in the Hagi Stakes and an unplaced run in the Daily Hai Sansai Stakes (GII), he finished second in the Fukushima Sansai Stakes. He ended his season on 12 December in the Asahi Hai Sansai Stakes (GI) at Nakayama Racecourse, finishing 13th behind Narita Brian.

=== 1994: three-year-old season ===
He began his three-year-old campaign with an 11th-place finish in the Shinzan Kinen (GIII). On 6 February, he contested the Kisaragi Sho (GIII) at Hanshin Racecourse. Starting as the lowest favourite in an 11-horse field at odds of 172.0, he led from the start in a slow pace and held on to win by a nose in a slow time of 2:07.4, recording his first graded stakes victory.

He then finished ninth in the Spring Stakes (GII) and 17th in the Satsuki Shō (GI). After a 14th-place finish in the Kyoto Yonsai Tokubetsu (GIII), he ran in the Tōkyō Yūshun (Japanese Derby) on 29 May, finishing 18th (last) behind Narita Brian. On 6 November, he contested the Kikuka Shō (GI), finishing 15th (last), again behind Narita Brian. Samson Big and Narita Brian were the only two horses to contest all three Classic Races that year. On 11 December, he was pulled up in the Aichi Hai (GIII).

=== 1995: four-year-old season ===
Samson Big struggled on the flat as a four-year-old, recording mostly double-digit finishes. His best result was a third-place finish in the Akino Stakes (Open) at Niigata Racecourse in November. He ended his flat season with a 13th-place finish in the Aichi Hai in December, after which he was switched to jump racing.

=== 1996: five-year-old season ===
He made his jump debut on 20 January 1996 in a maiden hurdle race at Kyoto, winning in a record time of 3:11.2. He then lost three consecutive allowance races before winning his fourth attempt at Chukyo Racecourse on 8 June to enter the open class. He was subsequently sidelined with an injury.

=== 1997: six-year-old season ===
Returning from a year-long break, Samson Big ran three times in open hurdle races in 1997, with his best finish being a third at Chukyo on 1 June. After finishing sixth in the Kokura Shogai Stakes on 19 July, he was retired from racing.

== Race record ==
The following table details all 35 starts of Samson Big's racing career based on official JBIS and netkeiba records. Record current as of his final start on 19 July 1997.

Date	Distance (Condition)	Race	Class	Course	Odds (Favourite)	Field	Finish	Time	Jockey	Winning (Losing) Margin	Winner (2nd Place)	Ref
1993 – two-year-old season
Jul 10	Dirt 1000 m (Good)	2-Y-O Newcomer	Maiden	Sapporo	3.3 (2nd)	8	1st	1:01.5	Yūichi Shikato	–0.8	(My Champion)	
Aug 1	Turf 1200 m (Good)	Sapporo Nisai Stakes	GIII	Sapporo	9.1 (3rd)	16	15th	1:14.1	Yūichi Shikato	3.1	Mellow Fruits	
Aug 29	Turf 1200 m (Heavy)	Clover Stakes	Open	Hakodate	26.1 (7th)	13	5th	1:13.6	Yūichi Shikato	1.1	Lioness Tosho	
Sep 26	Turf 1200 m (Heavy)	Hakodate Nisai Stakes	GIII	Hakodate	36.5 (7th)	9	2nd	1:14.3	Yūichi Shikato	0.2	Marry God	
Oct 23	Turf 1200 m (Good)	Hagi Stakes	Open	Kyoto	7.2 (3rd)	6	3rd	1:10.5	Yutaka Take	0.4	Inazuma Takao	
Nov 6	Turf 1400 m (Good)	Daily Hai Nisai Stakes	GII	Kyoto	61.6 (11th)	15	14th	1:24.5	Seiki Tabara	2.5	Bodyguard	
Nov 20	Turf 1200 m (Good)	Fukushima Nisai Stakes	Open	Fukushima	9.7 (5th)	11	2nd	1:10.9	Junichi Serizawa	0.3	Taiki Wolf	
Dec 12	Turf 1600 m (Good)	Asahi Hai Sansai Stakes	GI	Nakayama	99.5 (14th)	14	13th	1:37.2	Yūichi Shikato	2.8	Narita Brian	
1994 – three-year-old season
Jan 16	Turf 1600 m (Good)	Shinzan Kinen	GIII	Kyoto	76.8 (12th)	12	11th	1:39.1	Junichi Serizawa	2.3	Namura Kokuo	
Feb 6	Turf 2000 m (Good)	Kisaragi Sho	GIII	Hanshin	172.0 (11th)	11	1st	2:07.4	Hidetaka Tadokoro	–0.0	(Iide Liner)	
Mar 27	Turf 1800 m (Good)	Spring Stakes	GII	Nakayama	47.4 (7th)	10	9th	1:50.8	Yūichi Shikato	1.7	Narita Brian	
Apr 17	Turf 2000 m (Good)	Satsuki Shō	GI	Nakayama	158.8 (14th)	18	17th	2:01.7	Yūichi Shikato	2.7	Narita Brian	
May 8	Turf 2000 m (Good)	Kyoto Yonsai Tokubetsu	GIII	Kyoto	23.7 (8th)	14	14th	2:05.6	Hidetaka Tadokoro	4.5	Iide Liner	
May 29	Turf 2400 m (Good)	Tōkyō Yūshun	GI	Tokyo	183.3 (18th)	18	18th	2:34.2	Hidetaka Tadokoro	8.5	Narita Brian	
Nov 6	Turf 3000 m (Yielding)	Kikuka Shō	GI	Kyoto	157.4 (15th)	15	15th	3:11.1	Sadahiko Kojima	6.5	Narita Brian	
Dec 11	Turf 2000 m (Good)	Aichi Hai	GIII	Chukyo	35.6 (13th)	15	DNF	–	Kunihiko Watanabe	–	Tenzan Yutaka	
1995 – four-year-old season
Apr 22	Dirt 1400 m (Yielding)	Ritto Stakes	Open	Kyoto	105.1 (14th)	16	16th	1:26.8	Sadahiko Kojima	4.5	Marutaka Toko	
May 6	Turf 1200 m (Good)	Silk Road Stakes	Open	Kyoto	73.8 (12th)	16	15th	1:09.9	Sadahiko Kojima	2.0	Gold Mountain	
Jun 3	Turf 1400 m (Good)	Hankyu Hai	GIII	Kyoto	91.3 (12th)	18	7th	1:20.6	Takahito Kikuzawa	0.6	Bodyguard	
Jun 18	Turf 1800 m (Good)	Kinko Sho	GIII	Chukyo	50.8 (14th)	16	10th	1:49.6	Takahito Kikuzawa	1.3	Samani Beppin	
Jul 2	Dirt 1700 m (Yielding)	Tokai Stakes	Open	Chukyo	21.4 (8th)	16	12th	1:45.8	Takahito Kikuzawa	2.3	Cheers Atom	
Aug 13	Turf 1200 m (Good)	Marine Stakes	Open	Hakodate	30.2 (10th)	16	13th	1:10.8	Shogo Kikuchi	1.7	Nihon Pillow Study	
Sep 3	Turf 1200 m (Good)	Seikan Stakes	Open	Hakodate	97.4 (9th)	11	10th	1:11.3	Yūichi Shikato	1.7	Hokuto Phoebus	
Sep 30	Turf 1200 m (Good)	Autumn Sprint Stakes	Open	Nakayama	114.7 (10th)	10	9th	1:10.5	Masayoshi Ebina	1.4	Hokuto Phoebus	
Oct 14	Turf 1200 m (Good)	Opal Stakes	Open	Kyoto	120.4 (12th)	13	8th	1:08.4	Shogo Kikuchi	0.8	Nihon Pillow Study	
Nov 5	Turf 1800 m (Good)	Akino Stakes	Open	Niigata	47.1 (12th)	14	3rd	1:50.0	Teruhiko Chida	0.3	Wind Fields	
Dec 10	Turf 2000 m (Good)	Aichi Hai	GIII	Chukyo	36.0 (11th)	13	13th	2:05.1	Takaya Ueno	4.9	Sound Barrier	
1996 – five-year-old season
Jan 20	Jump 2910 m (Muddy)	Jump 4-Y-O+ Maiden	Maiden	Kyoto	5.1 (3rd)	10	1st	R3:11.2	Kazuya Nakatake	–1.3	(Upsurge)	
Feb 24	Jump 3000 m (Good)	Jump 4-Y-O+ 1-win	1-win	Hanshin	1.3 (1st)	10	4th	3:23.0	Kazuya Nakatake	1.7	Mister Doctor	
Mar 17	Jump 3000 m (Heavy)	Jump 4-Y-O+ 1-win	1-win	Hanshin	2.0 (1st)	11	2nd	3:22.6	Kazuya Nakatake	0.3	Kurino Ho O	
May 12	Jump 2910 m (Good)	Jump 4-Y-O+ 1-win	1-win	Hanshin	2.3 (1st)	13	2nd	3:12.0	Kazuya Nakatake	0.2	Upsurge	
Jun 8	Jump 2800 m (Good)	Jump 3-Y-O+ 1-win	1-win	Chukyo	2.1 (1st)	11	1st	3:03.2	Kazuya Nakatake	–1.3	(Erimono Tsubame)	
1997 – six-year-old season
Jun 1	Jump 2800 m (Good)	Jump 4-Y-O+ Open	Open	Chukyo	4.5 (3rd)	6	3rd	3:06.4	Kazuya Nakatake	1.4	Polaire	
Jun 29	Jump 2750 m (Heavy)	Jump 4-Y-O+ Open	Open	Fukushima	3.3 (2nd)	8	8th	3:06.4	Kazuya Nakatake	16.0	Fujiyama Daisen	
Jul 19	Jump 2950 m (Good)	Kokura Shogai Stakes	Open	Kokura	8.2 (3rd)	7	6th	3:21.7	Kazuya Nakatake	4.5	Neo Chimes	

- R indicated that it was a record time finish

== Retirement ==
Following his retirement, Samson Big was gelded and returned to his birthplace, Samson Farm. In 1998, he was donated to the Equestrian Club of the University of Tsukuba and was officially registered as an equestrian horse with the Japan Equestrian Federation on 1 April 1999. He competed in equestrian events until December 2009, after which he moved to a riding club in Tochigi Prefecture. His last recorded appearance was at a horse show in February 2011, and his whereabouts since then remain unknown.

== In popular culture ==
An anthropomorphized version of Samson Big appears as a character in the Japanese multimedia franchise Umamusume: Pretty Derby, voiced by Miyari Nemoto. She is depicted as an Umamusume of small stature in Tracen Academy's Senior Division, despite what her name suggests. Similarly to Haru Urara, she has a strong determination despite her losing streak, but has a greater understanding of how races affect her standing and awareness of her failures, and as such refuses to give up by throwing herself at problems until she succeeds. She admires Narita Brian and her racing style, while Brian has mutual respect for Big and approaches her of her own accord in contrast to Mayano Top Gun whom she finds annoying and actively tries to avoid.

== Pedigree ==
Pedigree of Samson Big (JPN)
Sire Sakura Shori (JPN) 1975	Partholon (IRE); 1960	Milesian	My Babu
Sire Sakura Shori (JPN) 1975	Partholon (IRE); 1960	Milesian	Oatflake
Sire Sakura Shori (JPN) 1975	Partholon (IRE); 1960	Paleo	Pharis
Sire Sakura Shori (JPN) 1975	Partholon (IRE); 1960	Paleo	Colonice
Sire Sakura Shori (JPN) 1975	Shirinel (JPN); 1968	Fortino	Grey Sovereign
Sire Sakura Shori (JPN) 1975	Shirinel (JPN); 1968	Fortino	Ranavalo
Sire Sakura Shori (JPN) 1975	Shirinel (JPN); 1968	Shirini	Tehran
Sire Sakura Shori (JPN) 1975	Shirinel (JPN); 1968	Shirini	Confection
Dam Shunichi Okan (JPN) 1978	Floribunda (GB); 1958	Princely Gift	Nasrullah
Dam Shunichi Okan (JPN) 1978	Floribunda (GB); 1958	Princely Gift	Blue Gem
Dam Shunichi Okan (JPN) 1978	Floribunda (GB); 1958	Asterntia	Denturius
Dam Shunichi Okan (JPN) 1978	Floribunda (GB); 1958	Asterntia	Aherlow Valley
Dam Shunichi Okan (JPN) 1978	Fujikawa (JPN); 1966	China Rock	Rockefella
Dam Shunichi Okan (JPN) 1978	Fujikawa (JPN); 1966	China Rock	May Wong
Dam Shunichi Okan (JPN) 1978	Fujikawa (JPN); 1966	Tsukikage	Hindostan
Dam Shunichi Okan (JPN) 1978	Fujikawa (JPN); 1966	Tsukikage	Ichijyo

- Samson Big is inbred 4 × 5 to Nasrullah.
- His fourth dam Ichijyo won the 1953 Kumohata Kinen, and his extended female family traces back to the foundational imported mare Astonishment.

== See also ==
- Thoroughbred racing in Japan
