= Kisaragi Sho =

Kisaragi Sho きさらぎ賞
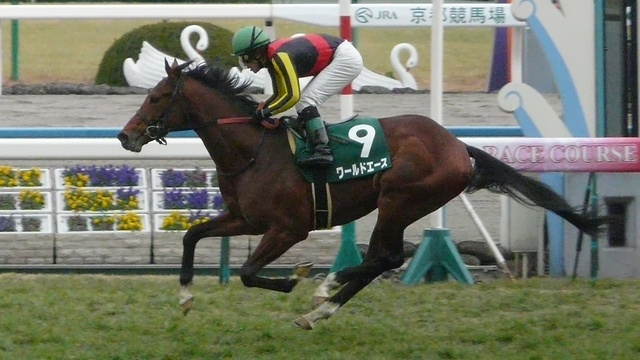
- World Ace wins the 2012 Kisaragi Sho
- Class: Grade 3
- Location: Kyoto Racecourse
- Inaugurated: 1961
- Race type: Thoroughbred Flat racing

Race information
- Distance: 1800 metres
- Surface: Turf
- Track: Right-handed
- Qualification: 3-y-o
- Weight: Colts 57 kg, fillies 55 kg
- Purse: ¥ 87,960,000 (as of 2026): 1st: ¥ 41,000,000; 2nd: ¥ 16,000,000; 3rd: ¥ 10,000,000

The Kisaragi Sho (Japanese きさらぎ賞) is a Japanese Grade 3 horse race for three-year-old Thoroughbreds run in February over a distance of 1800 metres at Kyoto Racecourse. The race is also known as the NHK Sho.

The race was first run in 1961 and was elevated to Grade 3 status in 1984. It was usually run at Chukyo Racecourse before being moved to its current venue in 1987. The race serves as a trial race for the Satsuki Sho, run in April. Past winners of the race include Special Week, Neo Universe, Tosen Ra and Satono Diamond.

== Winners since 2000 ==
Year	Winner	Jockey	Trainer	Owner	Time
2000	Silver Cockpit	Yutaka Take	Takayuki Yasuda	Makoto Kaneko	1:48.0
2001	Agnes Gold	Hiroshi Kawachi	Hiroyuki Nagahama	Takao Watanabe	1:47.9
2002	Mejiro Meyer	Yuji Iida	Yoshiyasu Tajima	Mejiro Farm	1:47.6
2003	Neo Universe	Yuichi Fukunaga	Tsutomu Setoguchi	Shadai Race Horse	1:49.6
2004	Meiner Brook	Shinji Fujita	Yasuhito Tamura	Thoroughbred Club Ruffian	1:48.0
2005	Kongo Rikishio	Shinji Fujita	Kenji Yamauchi	Hisao Kaneoka	1:48.5
2006	Dream Passport	Katsumi Ando	Ryuichi Inaba	Joy Race Horse	1:47.4
2007	Asakusa Kings	Koshiro Take	Ryuji Okubo	Keiko Tabara	1:48.8
2008	Rainbow Pegasus	Olivier Peslier	Ippo Sameshima	Toshiharu Yoshimura	1:48.8
2009	Reach The Crown	Yutaka Take	Hiroaki Sugiura	Hiroyoshi Usuda	1:48.9
2010	Neo Vendome	Mirco Demuro	Hideaki Fujiwara	Kimiyuki Kobayashi	1:48.6
2011	Tosen Ra	Mirco Demuro	Hideaki Fujiwara	Takaya Shimakawa	1:47.6
2012	World Ace	Futoshi Komaki	Yasutoshi Ikee	Sunday Racing	1:47.0
2013	Tamamo Best Play	Ryuji Wada	Katsumi Minai	Tamamo	1:48.9
2014	Tosen Stardom	Yutaka Take	Yasutoshi Ikee	Takaya Shimakawa	1:47.6
2015	Rouge Buck ^{[a]}	Keita Tosaki	Masahiro Otake	Carrot Farm	1:48.6
2016	Satono Diamond	Christophe Lemaire	Yasutoshi Ikee	Hajime Satomi	1:46.9
2017	America's Cup	Fuma Matsuwaka	Hidetaka Otonashi	Tatsuo Tanikake	1:50.1
2018	Satono Favor	Yoshihiro Furukawa	Katsumi Minai	Satomi Horse Company	1:48.8
2019	Danon Chaser	Yuga Kawada	Yasutoshi Ikee	Danox	1:49.0
2020	Cortesia	Kohei Matsuyama	Takashi Suzuki	Koji Maeda	1:48.3
2021	Lagom ^{[b]}	Yuichi Kitamura	Takashi Saito	Masamichi Hayashi	2:01.0
2022	Matenro Leo ^{[b]}	Norihiro Yokoyama	Mitsugu Kon	Chiyono Terada	2:00.5
2023	Hrimfaxi ^{[b]}	Yuga Kawada	Naosuke Sugai	Kaneko Makoto Holdings	1:59.7
2024	Byzantine Dream	Rene Piechulek	Tomoyasu Sakaguchi	Kazumi Yoshida	1:46.8
2025	Satono Shining	Atsuya Nishimura	Haruki Sugiyama	Hajime Satomi	1:47.0
2026	Zoroastro	Thore Hammer-Hansen	Keisuke Miyata	Sunday Racing	1:48.0

^{a} The 2015 winner Rouge Buck was a filly.

^{b} The 2021, 2022, and 2023 race was run over 2000 metres at Chukyo.

== Earlier winners ==
- 1961 - Sugi Hime
- 1962 - Rising Masaru
- 1963 - Ice Blue
- 1964 - Flamingo
- 1965 - Dai Koter
- 1966 - Taishu
- 1967 - Shibafuji
- 1968 - Marchs
- 1969 - Taka Tsubaki
- 1970 - Tanino Moutier
- 1971 - Hikaru Imai
- 1972 - Hide Hayate
- 1973 - Kuri Onward
- 1974 - Kitano Kachidoki
- 1975 - Three Flam
- 1976 - Spirit Swaps
- 1977 - Ryu Kiko
- 1978 - Inter Gushiken
- 1979 - Nehai Jet
- 1980 - Noto Diver
- 1981 - Lead Wonder
- 1982 - Waka Tenzan
- 1983 - Nihon Pillow Winner
- 1984 - Gold Way
- 1985 - Ibuki Kaner
- 1986 - Fumino Applause
- 1987 - Tochino Ruler
- 1988 - Meiner Frisse
- 1989 - Nice Nice Nice
- 1990 - Haku Taisei
- 1991 - Shin Horisky
- 1992 - Hishi Masaru
- 1993 - Tsuji Utopian
- 1994 - Samson Big
- 1995 - Ski Captain
- 1996 - Royal Touch
- 1997 - Hiroki Gumo
- 1998 - Special Week
- 1999 - Narita Top Road

== See also ==
- Horse racing in Japan
- List of Japanese flat horse races
