= B – The Beginning =

Original anime series produced by Netflix

- B: The Beginning
- Main visual
- Genre: Psychological thriller; Science fiction; Suspense
- Created by: Kazuto Nakazawa; Production I.G
- Original net animation
- Directed by: Kazuto Nakazawa; Yoshinobu Yamakawa
- Produced by: Rui Kuroki
- Written by: Katsuya Ishida
- Music by: Yoshihiro Ike
- Studio: Production I.G
- Licensed by: Netflix; AUS: Madman Entertainment; UK/NA: Anime Limited
- Released: March 2, 2018
- Runtime: 25–27 minutes
- Episodes: 12
- Original net animation

B: Succession
- Directed by: Kazuto Nakazawa (Note: Credited as Chief Director (総監督, Sō Kantoku).); Itsuro Kawasaki
- Written by: Katsuya Ishida; Kazuto Nakazawa
- Music by: Yoshihiro Ike
- Studio: Production I.G
- Licensed by: Netflix; UK/NA: Anime Limited
- Released: March 18, 2021
- Runtime: 23–25 minutes
- Episodes: 6
- icon

B: The Beginning (B: ザ・ビギニング, Bī: Za Beginingu) is an original net animation (ONA) series created by Production I.G and Kazuto Nakazawa. The series premiered on March 2, 2018, worldwide on Netflix.

A second season, titled B: Succession (B: サクセッション, Bī Sakusesshon), premiered on March 18, 2021.

== Premise ==
In a world powered by advanced technology, crime and violence sweep through the archipelagic nation of Cremona (inspired by the real city of Cremona in Italy, and other cities of Lombardy such as Milan). Chief among the major players is "Killer B", a vigilante serial killer who has thrown the city into chaos. The stories of the protagonist Koku; Keith Flick, a legendary investigator of the Royal Investigation Service (RIS); and a mysterious criminal organization intertwine on the path to reach their objectives.

Koku is a demihuman with the ability to shape-shift parts of his body into wings and blades, and he is attempting to save his childhood friend Yuna. Keith is attempting to solve the murder of his sister Erika 8 years ago. Both of them are up against the Market Maker, a hidden organization that controls the government of the island to understand the magical powers that Koku has and where they came from.

== Voice cast ==
Character
Character	Japanese	English
Keith Kazama Flick	Hiroaki Hirata	Ray Chase
Koku	Yūki Kaji	Kyle McCarley
Lily Hoshina	Asami Seto	Faye Mata
Eric Toga	Hiroki Tōchi	Jalen K. Cassell
Boris Meier	Minoru Inaba	Doug Stone
Kaela Yoshinaga	Ami Koshimizu	Allegra Clark
Brian Brandon	Toshiyuki Toyonaga	Khoi Dao
Mario Luís Zurita	Shintarō Tanaka	Patrick Seitz
Jean-Henri Richard	Atsushi Goto	Keith Osterberg
Gilbert Ross	Toshiyuki Morikawa	John DeMita
Laica	Yu Kitada	Xander Mobus
Minatsuki	Kaito Ishikawa	Johnny Yong Bosch

== Production ==
Netflix announced the series on February 24, 2016, stating that the series would air 12 episodes and debut in 190 countries around the world. It was originally titled Perfect Bones. The title was later revealed to be B: The Beginning. Kazuto Nakazawa directed the series and designed the characters while also serving as key animation supervisor, Yoshinobu Yamakawa also directed the series alongside Nakazawa, Katsuya Ishida wrote the scripts, and Yoshihiro Ike composed the music.

The theme song "The Perfect World" was performed by guitarist Marty Friedman and Man with a Mission's vocalist Jean-Ken Johnny in collaboration with bassist Ken-Ken and drummer Kōji Fujimoto. The series premiered on March 2, 2018.

Anime Limited acquired the series for home video distribution in the United Kingdom and Ireland. It was announced on May 30 in the Anime Matsuri Panel that it'll also see a North American release. Shout! Factory would co-distribute it. It was released on October 2, 2020.

During the 2018 Annecy International Animated Film Festival, Netflix announced that a second season is in production. The second season, titled B: Succession, was released on March 18, 2021. Itsuro Kawasaki is directing the series, with Kazuto Nakazawa serving as chief director, and the rest of the staff and cast are reprising their roles.

== Episodes ==
Season	Episodes	Originally released
1	12	March 2, 2018
2	6	March 18, 2021

=== Season 1: The Beginning (2018) ===
No. overall	No. in season	Title	Storyboarded by	Animation direction	Original release date
1	1	"Episode 1"	Yoshinobu Yamakawa	Kazuto Nakazawa	March 2, 2018
The Royal Investigation Service (RIS) pursue Killer B for a series of murders of suspected criminals. A survivor of the latest attack is recruited by Quinn, a member of a mysterious organization, to steal a prototype weapon and go on a rampage, luring out Koku. Genius detective Keith Flick sees through the diversion to an even greater theft. Using superhuman powers, Koku and Quinn battle atop a runaway train, the wreck of which is later used to leave the Killer B signature.
2	2	"Episode 2"	Yoshinobu Yamakawa	Ken'ichi Matsuzawa	March 2, 2018
At a staged Killer B crime scene the RIS find a body killed by a poison gas, which they fear will be released at the mayor's charity gala. While searching the gigantic hotel, the RIS attend undercover and thwart an attack on the mayor. The criminals then take over the building's automation and threaten to release the gas. Lured to the event, Koku follows Izanami to the rooftop.
3	3	"Episode 3"	Iwao Teraoka	Toshiya Niidome	March 2, 2018
Kaela defeats the building lockdown and Minatsuki releases a knockout gas to aid his people in covering their involvement. Keith realizes the meaningless crimes are being used to lure Killer B, and tries to pursue by car as Izanami leads Koku from the rooftop. At Lake Lenan she tries to stir the memories Koku locked away, but he fights and defeats her. She tells him to touch Canopus. Lily has a bad gut feeling about the crimes, but Marco inspires Lily and Bran with their oath of service.
4	4	"Episode 4"	Kanta Kamei	Takahiro Kawakoshi	March 2, 2018
In a flashback or dream, Keith sees Erika Kazumi Flick tortured and killed. He and Koku each go to the royal library for research. Lily demands Keith use his genius to explain the mysteries underlying the crimes. Boris accidentally invites the team to a drinks party at Keith's. Bran discovers that the entire precinct is being surveilled, but he is attacked before he can leave the building.
5	5	"Episode 5"	Shunsuke Tada	Yoshiko Okuda	March 2, 2018
Bran survives the attack but the team are ordered to keep their distance from the investigation which appears to be an inside job. Lily and Koku each pursue Keith for answers. Kaela recovers data from Bran's damaged laptop but the surveillance program is shut down before she can trace it. Keith receives a clue from Bran and sets a trap for his attacker, Jean-Henri, who turns it around by killing himself to frame Keith for his death. Koku snatches Keith away to the rooftop and asks if he is Canopus; Keith acknowledges Koku as Killer B or, rather, 13. Kamui falters as his need for a stabilizing drug increases.
6	6	"Episode 6"	Kazuto Nakazawa	Ken'ichi Matsuzawa	March 2, 2018
Koku demands Yuna's location, and Keith realizes Koku's messages were addressed to her. Keith has become a murder suspect and the team look into his past. Keith tells Koku about the Jaula Blanca Institute which tried to recreate winged beings whose fossilized remains were found, to restore gods of the past. The program resulted in malformed and insane people, who were ultimately used as a covert strike team called Market Maker. As a child Keith decoded an inscription which gave vital insight into the structure of the gods, and his father led research toward the institute's original goal. But Market Maker turned on the institute and destroyed it. Yuna appears and attacks Koku. He gains the advantage but his memories return when he sees her eyes and realizes who she is. She stabs him but her memories also return. However, as they accept each other, Minatsuki runs them through with a sword.
7	7	"Episode 7"	Kazuchika Kise	Takahiro Kawakoshi	March 2, 2018
Minatsuki takes a wounded Yuna while Market Maker attack an enraged Koku. Kamui keeps Koku occupied, and dozens of harpoons are launched from the airship Moby Dick, impaling them both. Keith fires a shotgun at a gloating Minatsuki, who is shocked to find the wound burning. On Laica's counsel they withdraw to the airship, leaving Keith to tend Koku's injuries. A flashback shows Koku and Yuna as children at the institute, making their secret sign, and being separated when the institute was attacked. Koku's protectors died defending him and he assimilated their body parts, but couldn't live with the guilt and suppressed his memories. The RIS is given 24 hours to find Keith or face disbandment. Minatsuki's left arm is amputated by Regulus, the ringleader who led Market Maker's revolt.
8	8	"Episode 8"	Kazuto Nakazawa	Ai Yoshimura	March 2, 2018
Lying low, Keith asks Koku about Dead Kyle, said to have killed his sister Erika. Koku explains that he was a Reggie, a superhuman killer released into society when he became unstable, like all the criminals Koku had killed. Keith briefly contacts Eric to let him know it's coming to a conclusion. Examining Keith's notes, Lily feels they are a cry for help and learns about Erika. Eric suspends her, believing she can find Keith and help. Kaela rebuilds a secure system, Nautilus, and tracks Lily but Market Maker also track her. Shortly after Lily finds Keith with Koku, Takeru attacks them.
9	9	"Episode 9"	Kazuya Nomura	Takashi Andō	March 2, 2018
Koku counterattacks and kills Takeru. Kukuri confronts Minatsuki with her loss and is strangled. Keith turns himself in and explains that the madness Market Maker creates has spread within the organisation, and needs to be exposed. Keith claims to have a suspect but no proof. Eric derides Keith for waiting so long to ask for help. Eric admits that the abduction of Dead Kyle to expose the cover-up had been his idea but Keith acted alone; Eric then assembled and trained the best people he could find into a team so they could do what they couldn't before. He puts them at Keith's disposal. Keith suspects Gilbert, a forensics doctor and his childhood friend, who is still obsessed with Erika. Lily provokes him but Gilbert realizes he is being manipulated. He switches places with Kamui and another Reggie who set a trap for Marco and Boris. Lily awakens on a forensics table where Gilbert intends to carve her up before Keith arrives.
10	10	"Episode 10"	Yoshinobu Yamakawa	Itsuro Kawasaki	March 2, 2018
Yuna awakens, healed, but refuses to cooperate with Minatsuki. Searching for Gilbert and Lily, Keith deduces that Gilbert operates on lookalikes of Erika in a secret lab within the building. Keith and Eric find his trophy room with dozens of preserved bodies, including Gilbert's father, the last chief executive of the institute. Gilbert phones Keith to taunt him, leaving Lily behind to make his escape. Gilbert orders Market Maker to kill everyone associated with them working for the police, but Laica refuses and severs their relationship. Gilbert breaks down at the loss, but quickly suppresses and discards that personality to prepare for a final confrontation with Keith.
11	11	"Episode 11"	Kazuto Nakazawa	Ken'ichi Matsuzawa	March 2, 2018
Koku uses a powerful uplift to reach the Moby Dick. He fights an insane Minatsuki who turns out to be an expiring Reggie whose memories were altered by the real Minatsuki – Laica, who sets a bomb on the airship. He escapes by helicopter with Yuna and returns to the hill where the fossils and inscription were discovered. Lily awakens in the hospital and realizes that Keith is pursuing Gilbert on his own. Gilbert tells Keith how he proposed and led the attack on the institute, gaining Minatsuki's confidence with a lie. Minatsuki was the original target of the attack, as he could stabilize all the Reggies and give them independence from the military and king. Believing that he is following prophecy, Laica stabs Yuna.
12	12	"Episode 12"	Yoshinobu Yamakawa	Kazuto Nakazawa	March 2, 2018
Though advised by Keith to avoid the Jetblack, which may rob him of his powers, Koku goes there to save Yuna from Laica. Assured of his right and advantage, Laica falls to Izanami's leg. Gilbert explains how he was deeply affected when Keith denounced murder, and how so much of what he did was to win Keith to his way of thinking, by putting him into a situation where he would consciously choose to kill. Keith initially rejects this but when Lily is threatened he shoots Gilbert in the head. Three months later, things begin to return to normal as Koku and Yuna begin to live normal lives. In a post-credits scene, Kirisame, Koku's childhood protector, is shown to be working with the administration that oversees Market Maker and the RIS.

=== Season 2: Succession (2021) ===
No. overall	No. in season	Title	Storyboarded by	Animation direction	Original release date
13	1	"Episode 1"	Iwao Teraoka	Kazuki Yokoyama	March 18, 2021
Koku assaults a small convoy, engaging in non-lethal means and kidnapping the VIP. Flash backs shows Koku approached by Kirisame, a figure from his childhood who he thought was dead. He asks Koku to join him in his fight for a new world order.
14	2	"Episode 2"	Koji Sawai	Tadashi Nakamura	March 18, 2021
Kirisame's subordinates force Koku into carrying out an act of violence against a senator. Then Koku breaks into the royal palace.
15	3	"Episode 3"	Koji Sawai	Ken'ichi Matsuzawa	March 18, 2021
The royal palace refuses to fully cooperate with the RIS investigation. Lily and Koku head out to get more information on Keith's disappearance.
16	4	"Episode 4"	Tomomi Kamiya	Katsuya Asano	March 18, 2021
Keith's friends narrow down possible locations where he's being held, but with Keith already starting to hallucinate from hunger. Within this hallucination, Erica and Gilbert unfolds the tragic past to a remorseful Keith.
17	5	"Episode 5"	Takashi Igari	Takashi Igari	March 18, 2021
Koku, Izanami and Yuna have to fight off an ambush from Kirisame's subordinates. Lily gets pulled over while driving with the king in her car.
18	6	"Episode 6"	Koji Sawai	Iroha Mitsuki, Hajime Aizu	March 18, 2021
With the RIS continuing their pursuit of Killer B, Koku goes into hiding, but Kirisame seeks him out for a final confrontation.
