= Tosen Ra =

Japanese thoroughbred racehorse

Tosen Ra; トーセンラー
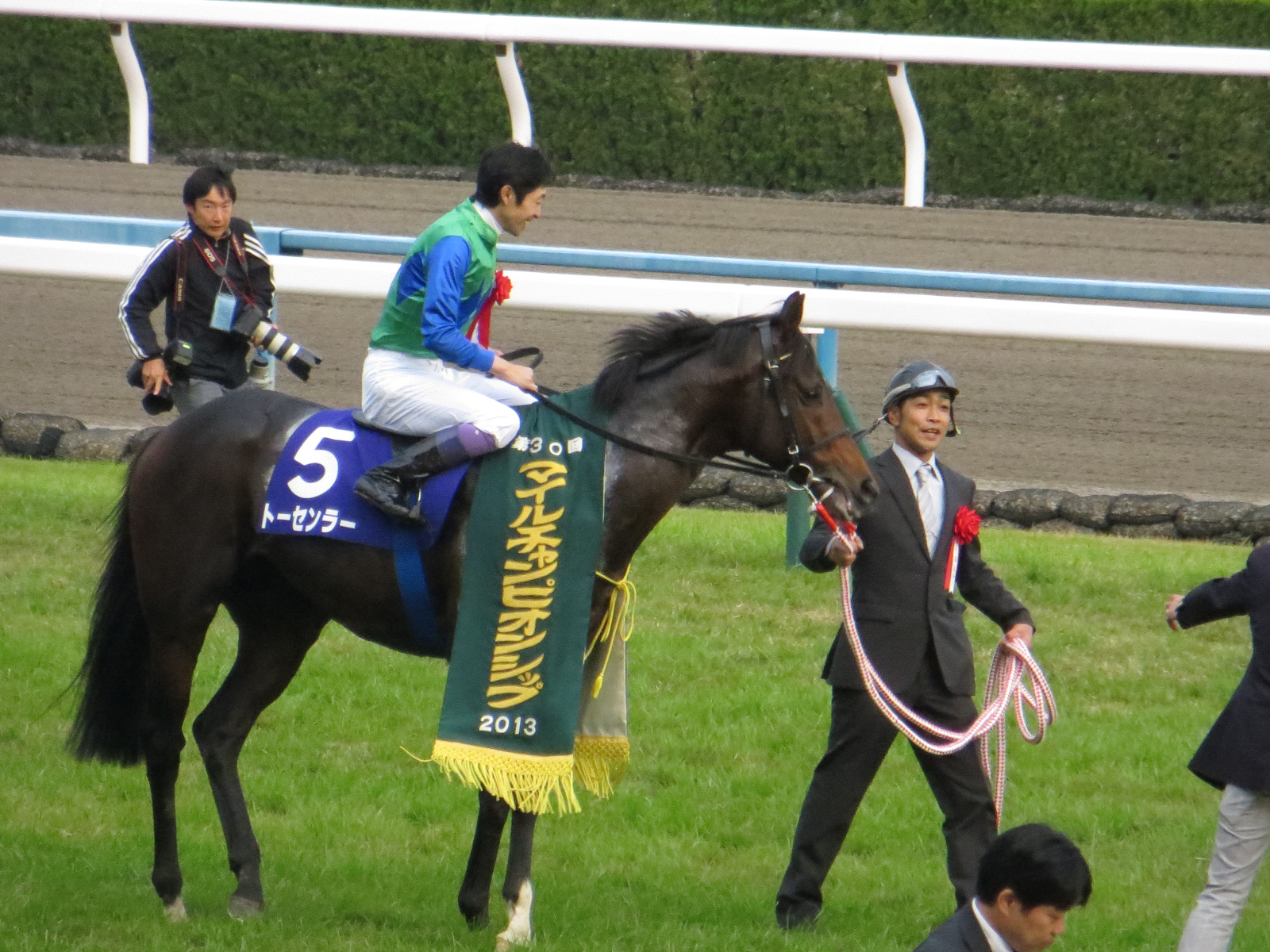
- Tosen Ra in the winning ceremony of the 2013 Mile Championship
- Sire: Deep Impact
- Grandsire: Sunday Silence
- Dam: Princess Olivia
- Damsire: Lycius
- Sex: Stallion
- Foaled: April 21, 2008
- Country: Japan
- Color: Dark bay/brown
- Breeder: Shadai Farm
- Owner: Takaya Shimakawa
- Racing colours
- Trainer: Hideaki Fujiwara
- Jockey: Yutaka Take
- Record: 25: 4-5-6
- Earnings: $5,058,792

Major wins
- Kisaragi Sho (2011); Mile Championship (2013); Kyōto Kinen (2013)
- Last updated on 29 January 2026

Tosen Ra (in Japanese: トーセンラー) (foaled April 21, 2008) is a Japanese retired Thoroughbred racehorse and breeding stallion who won the 2013 Mile Championship.

The horse's name comes from the combination of the brand name, Tosen, and Ra, the sun god in Egyptian mythology.

== Racing career ==
Tosen's first race was on November 7, 2010, in Kyoto in which he came in 1st place. He then won the Kisaragi Sho on February 6, 2011, which was the first graded race win in his career. He was trained in preparation for the classic races that year. A few weeks before the Satsuki Sho, he was at the Yamamoto training centre in Miyagi prefecture when it was hit by an earthquake and tsunami, which he survived; the race was relocated to Tokyo that year. He finished in seventh at the Satsuki Sho, eleventh at the Tokyo Yushun and snatched the third place at the Kikuka Sho.

His start for the 2012 season was not excellent when he only got fourth-place in the Kyōto Kinen. He improved in the autumn campaign when he managed to place second in two Group 3 races, the Tanabata Sho and Kokura Kinen. He ended the mediocre season with a seventh-place finish at the Niigata Kinen.

The bad season start flipped in the new calendar year as on February 10, 2013, he won the Kyōto Kinen. He made a good stretch along the earlier part of the race, moved outside and surpassed Shonan Mighty at the straight to bring it home. His biggest feat of this season would happen on the November 17. On this day, Yutaka Take put his absolute best when he rode him from near the back of the 18-horse field in upper stretch and urged a sweeping outside rally to catch Daiwa Maggiore and Danon Shark to grab his 100th Group 1 win in the Mile Championship. This first G1 win gained by Tosen Ra eventually proved to be the last win of his career.

In 2014, he only placed in second and failed to defend his win in the Kyoto Kinen. On December 28, 2014, he came in 8th on his last race in the 2014 Arima Kinen. Shortly after the Arima Kinen race, he was retired as a racehorse, assigned to be a stud at Rex Stud in Shizunai, Shinhidaka Town and removed from the race registration list. A look back on his career had shown that all his career wins came on the Kyoto Racecourse. This consistency on that particular racecourse earned him the nickname of Kyoto Expert or Kyoto Demon when he was active. He was also known as a horse with powerful late kicks when he gained momentum on the uphill phase of the third corner at that racecourse, which was clearly shown in his Mile Championship win. His main jockey, Take, described him as the one who had the footwork of Deep Impact, could ran on good tracks but really bad with the muddy tracks.

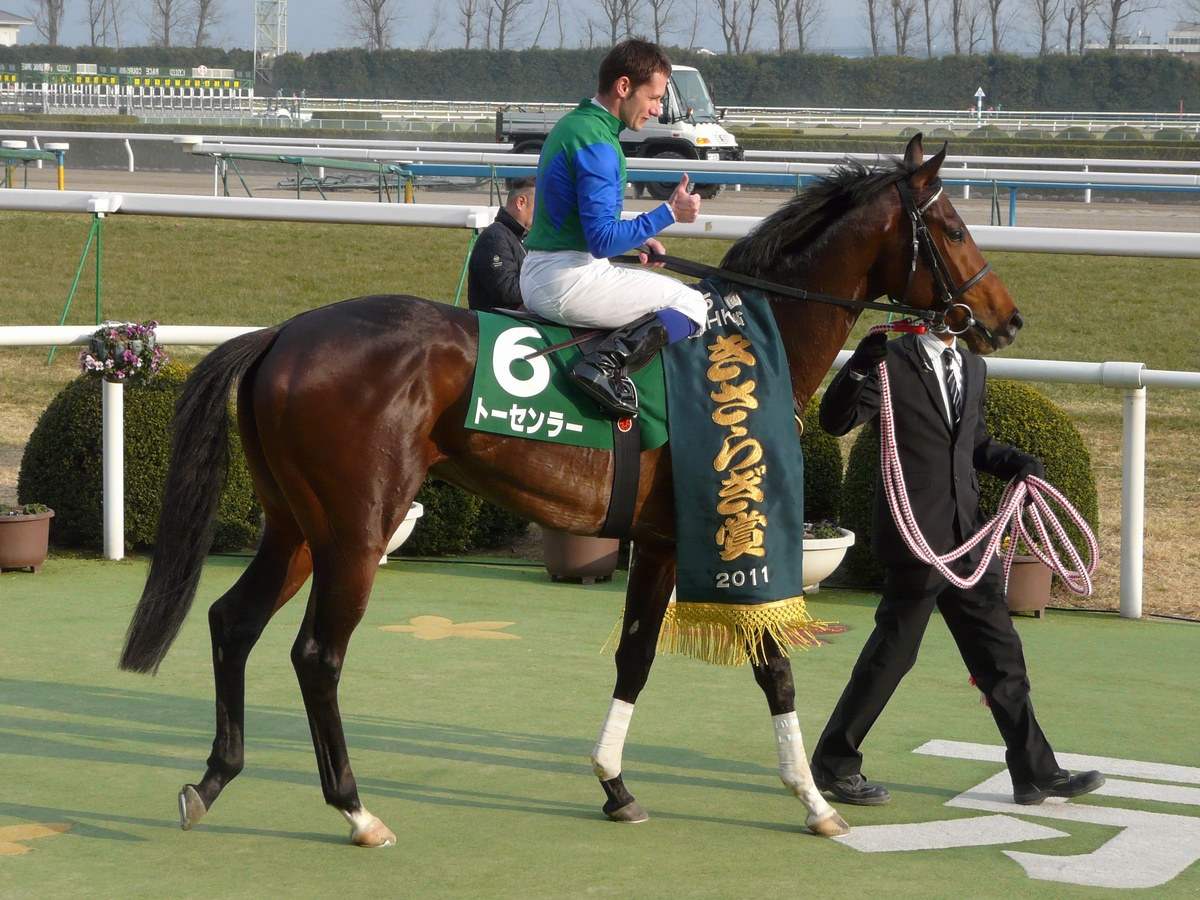
Tosen Ra in the 2011 Kisaragi Sho winning ceremony

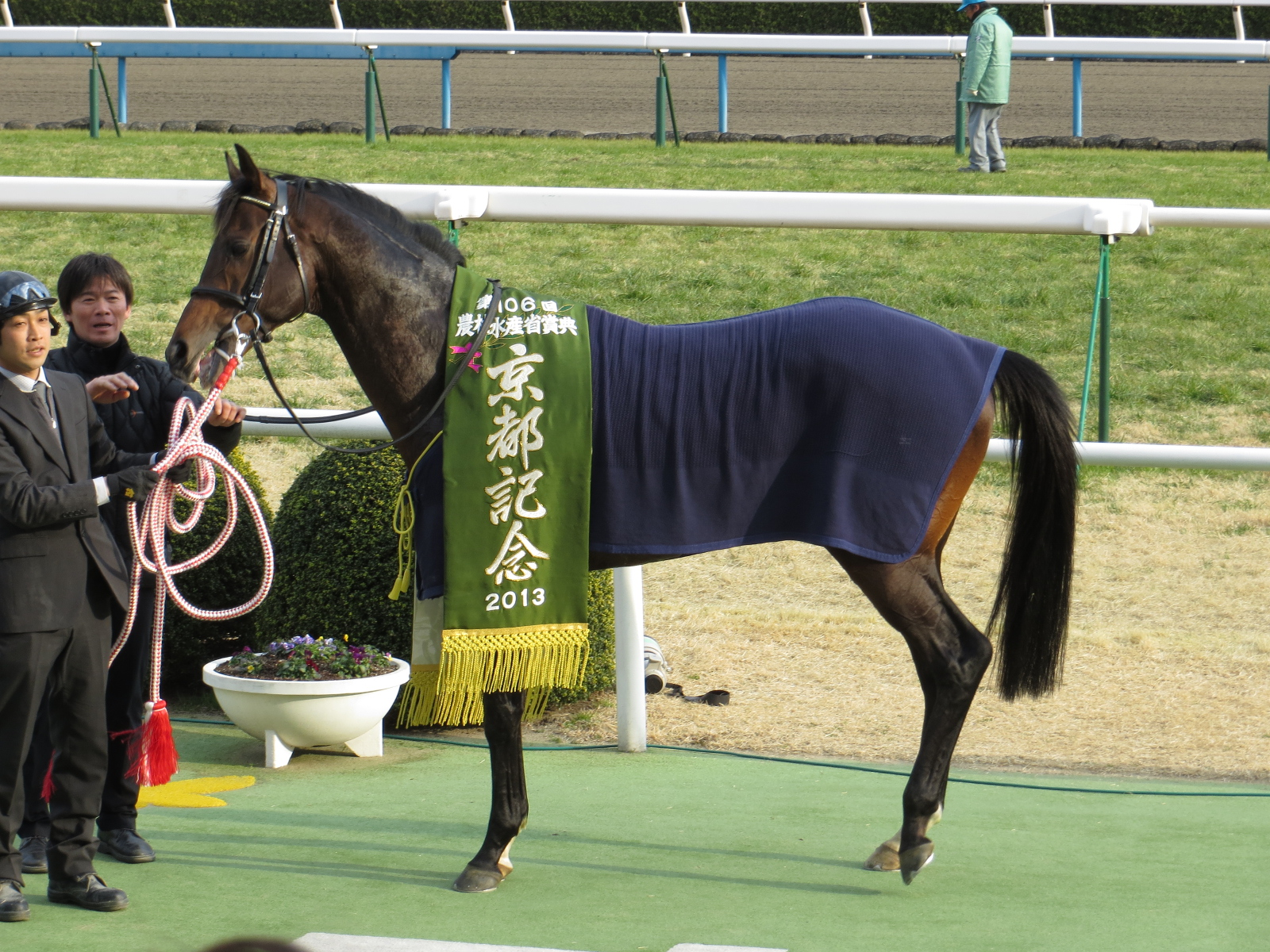
Tosen Ra with the winning sash of the 2013 Kyoto Kinen

== Racing form ==
Tosen Ra won four races out of 25 starts. This data is available on JBIS and netkeiba.

Date	Track	Race	Grade	Distance (Condition)	Entry	HN	Odds (Favored)	Finish	Time	Margins	Jockey	Winner (Runner-up)
2010 – two-year-old season
Nov 7	Kyoto	2yo Newcomer		1,800 m (Firm)	13	8	1.5 (1)	1st	1:51.4	0.0	Yutaka Take	(Harbor Commando)
Dec 12	Hanshin	Erica Sho	ALW (1W)	2,000 m (Firm)	9	2	4.8 (3)	3rd	2:05.5	0.3	Yutaka Take	Smart Robin
2011 – three-year-old season
Jan 8	Kyoto	Fukujuso Tokubetsu	ALW (1W)	2,000 m (Firm)	14	10	2.2 (1)	3rd	2:00.8	0.0	Yutaka Take	Cosmo Hager
Feb 6	Kyoto	Kisaragi Sho	3	1,800 m (Firm)	12	6	5.1 (3)	1st	1:47.6	0.0	Mirco Demuro	(Rikisan Max)
Apr 24	Tokyo	Satsuki Sho	1	2,000 m (Firm)	18	16	12.1 (5)	7th	2:01.6	1.0	Masayoshi Ebina	Orfevre
May 29	Tokyo	Tokyo Yushun	1	2,400 m (Heavy)	18	15	15.8 (7)	11th	2:33.0	2.5	Masayoshi Ebina	Orfevre
Sep 18	Nakayama	St. Lite Kinen	2	2,200 m (Firm)	17	2	4.1 (3)	2nd	2:10.5	0.2	Masayoshi Ebina	Fateful War
Oct 23	Kyoto	Kikuka Sho	1	3,000 m (Firm)	18	1	12.2 (3)	3rd	3:03.5	0.7	Masayoshi Ebina	Orfevre
2012 – four-year-old season
Feb 12	Kyoto	Kyoto Kinen	2	2,200 m (Firm)	9	4	5.2 (4)	4th	2:13.0	0.6	Cristian Demuro	Trailblazer
Mar 24	Nakayama	Nikkei Sho	2	2,500 m (Soft)	14	14	15.0 (4)	10th	2:39.1	1.7	Hiroyuki Uchida	Neko Punch
May 6	Niigata	Niigata Daishoten	3	2,000 m (Good)	15	7	5.7 (3)	11th	1:59.7	0.7	Suguru Hamanaka	Hit the Target
Jun 2	Hanshin	Naruo Kinen	3	2,000 m (Firm)	10	6	10.1 (5)	3rd	2:00.5	0.4	Yasunari Iwata	To the Glory
Jul 8	Fukushima	Tanabata Sho	3	2,000 m (Good)	16	5	4.3 (1)	2nd	2:01.1	0.0	Yasunari Iwata	Asuka Kurichan
Aug 5	Kokura	Kokura Kinen	3	2,000 m (Firm)	12	5	2.7 (1)	2nd	1:57.7	0.4	Yuga Kawada	Expedition
Sep 2	Niigata	Niigata Kinen	3	2,000 m (Firm)	18	14	4.6 (1)	7th	1:57.8	0.2	Masayoshi Ebina	Transwarp
2013 – five-year-old season
Feb 10	Kyoto	Kyoto Kinen	2	2,200 m (Firm)	11	11	9.2 (6)	1st	2:12.5	–0.2	Yutaka Take	(Veiled Impact)
Apr 28	Kyoto	Tenno Sho (Spring)	1	3,200 m (Firm)	18	1	13.6 (3)	2nd	3:14.4	0.2	Yutaka Take	Fenomeno
Jun 23	Hanshin	Takarazuka Kinen	1	2,200 m (Firm)	11	6	14.2 (4)	5th	2:14.2	1.0	Yutaka Take	Gold Ship
Oct 6	Kyoto	Kyoto Daishoten	2	2,400 m (Firm)	13	11	6.3 (2)	3rd	2:23.2	0.3	Hideaki Miyuki	Hit the Target
Nov 17	Kyoto	Mile Championship	1	1,600 m (Firm)	18	5	4.7 (2)	1st	1:32.4	–0.2	Yutaka Take	(Daiwa Maggiore)
2014 – six-year-old season
Feb 16	Kyoto	Kyoto Kinen	2	2,200 m (Good)	12	10	3.7 (2)	2nd	2:16.1	0.1	Yutaka Take	Desperado
Jun 8	Tokyo	Yasuda Kinen	1	1,600 m (Heavy)	17	16	22.0 (8)	14th	1:38.7	1.9	Yutaka Take	Just A Way
Oct 14	Kyoto	Kyoto Daishoten	2	2,400 m (Firm)	12	2	2.6 (1)	3rd	2:24.5	0.3	Yutaka Take	Last Impact
Nov 23	Kyoto	Mile Championship	1	1,600 m (Firm)	17	13	4.7 (2)	4th	1:31.8	0.3	Yutaka Take	Danon Shark
Dec 28	Nakayama	Arima Kinen	1	2,500 m (Firm)	16	1	22.8 (8)	8th	2:35.7	0.4	Yutaka Take	Gentildonna

Legend:
Turf

== Stud record ==
He was put to stud at Rex Stud and moved to the Breeders' Stallion Station on 2016. Since then, he acted as shuttling stud between those two breeding farm. He moved out from Rex Stud to S. T. Farm in 2024 and continues his job as shuttling stud from there.

=== Major winners ===
Grade winners
Foaled	Name	Sex	Major Wins
2016	Zadar	Colt	Kyoto Kimpai, Epsom Cup
2019	Drop of Light	Filly	Turquoise Stakes, CBC Sho
2023	Candide	Colt	Chukyo Nisai Stakes

== Pedigree ==
Pedigree of Tosen Ra (JPN), 2008
Sire Deep Impact (JPN) 2002	Sunday Silence (USA); 1986	Halo	Hail to Reason
Sire Deep Impact (JPN) 2002	Sunday Silence (USA); 1986	Halo	Cosmah
Sire Deep Impact (JPN) 2002	Sunday Silence (USA); 1986	Wishing Well	Understanding
Sire Deep Impact (JPN) 2002	Sunday Silence (USA); 1986	Wishing Well	Mountain Flower
Sire Deep Impact (JPN) 2002	Wind in Her Hair (IRE); 1991	Alzao	Lyphard
Sire Deep Impact (JPN) 2002	Wind in Her Hair (IRE); 1991	Alzao	Lady Rebecca
Sire Deep Impact (JPN) 2002	Wind in Her Hair (IRE); 1991	Burghclere	Busted
Sire Deep Impact (JPN) 2002	Wind in Her Hair (IRE); 1991	Burghclere	Highclere
Dam Princess Olivia (USA) 1995 F. no: 17-b	Lycius (USA); 1988	Mr. Prospector	Raise a Native
Dam Princess Olivia (USA) 1995 F. no: 17-b	Lycius (USA); 1988	Mr. Prospector	Gold Digger
Dam Princess Olivia (USA) 1995 F. no: 17-b	Lycius (USA); 1988	Lypatia	Lyphard
Dam Princess Olivia (USA) 1995 F. no: 17-b	Lycius (USA); 1988	Lypatia	Hypatia
Dam Princess Olivia (USA) 1995 F. no: 17-b	Dance Image (IRE); 1990	Sadler's Wells	Northern Dancer
Dam Princess Olivia (USA) 1995 F. no: 17-b	Dance Image (IRE); 1990	Sadler's Wells	Fairy Bridge
Dam Princess Olivia (USA) 1995 F. no: 17-b	Dance Image (IRE); 1990	Diamond Spring	Vaguely Noble
Dam Princess Olivia (USA) 1995 F. no: 17-b	Dance Image (IRE); 1990	Diamond Spring	Dumfries

- Tosen Ra is an inbred of 4 x 4 to Lyphard, 4 x 5 x 5 to Northern Dancer (2x Lyphard's sire) and 5 x 5 x 5 to Goofed (2x Lyphard's and Dumfries's dam).
- Spielberg, the 2014 Tenno Sho (Autumn) winner is his full-blooded brother.
