= Koruri (given name) =

- Gender: Female

Origin
- Origin: Japan
- Meaning: Different meanings depending on the kanji used.

Other names
- Variant form: 7
- See also: Kana; Ruri

Koruri (こるり) is a feminine Japanese given name which is written in a variety of forms. It is synonymous with the word Coruri (コルリ), which means Siberian blue robin (Luscinia cyane) in Japanese.

== Written forms ==
Koruri can be written using different kanji characters and can mean:

- 小琉璃 - "small, jewelry, crystal"
- 小瑠凛 - "small, lapis, gallant"
- 小瑠璃 - "small, lapis, crystal"
- 心瑠璃 - "heart, lapis, crystal" (Note: When meaning 心瑠璃, Koruri might be read in a unique way.)
- 湖瑠璃 - "lake, lapis, crystal"
- 瑚瑠璃 - "name of the ritual, lapis, crystal"
- 瑚瑠里 - "name of the ritual, lapis, earth"

== Meaning ==
Used as a noun, Koruri is the Japanese word for the Siberian blue robin (Luscinia cyane). As a given name or proper noun, the first kanji stroke of koruri is ko. Sounds that start with ka are often used for those in relationships, or for actions such as winning, competing, overcoming, and cooperating. Sounds with vowels such as ko (o) express open-mindedness and give the impression of being cooperative and solid. This first kanji stroke can also mean small which gives the impression of cuteness. Next is the kanji character ru, which has the images of jewelry and gorgeous. The final kanji stroke used is ri, which means refined and beautiful. In terms of luck, the status (地格は) of the name is determined by the Kanji used. A majority of the different varieties of Kanji used in the name indicate great luck with the exception of 瑚瑠璃 and 瑚瑠里.

== Fictional characters ==
- Koruri, a character in Tsubasa Reservoir Chronicle the Movie: The Princess in the Birdcage Kingdom.
- Koruri (小瑠璃), a character in 7 Seeds.
- Koruri Tokitani (時谷 小瑠璃, Tokitani Koruri), a character in Girl Friend Beta.
