= Ruri Rocks =

Japanese manga series

- First tankōbon volume cover, featuring Nagi Arato (left) and Ruri Tanigawa (right)

瑠璃の宝石 (Ruri no Hōseki)
- Genre: Adventure; Slice of life
- Manga
- Written by: Keiichirō Shibuya
- Published by: Enterbrain
- Imprint: Harta Comix
- Magazine: Harta
- Original run: August 10, 2019 – present
- Volumes: 8
- Anime television series
- Directed by: Shingo Fujii
- Written by: Michiko Yokote
- Music by: Daisuke Achiwa; Kazuki Yanagawa
- Studio: Studio Bind
- Licensed by: Crunchyroll; SEA: Plus Media Networks Asia
- Original network: AT-X, Tokyo MX, BS11, TVA, ABC TV
- Original run: July 6, 2025 – September 28, 2025
- Episodes: 13
- icon

Ruri Rocks (Japanese: 瑠璃の宝石, Hepburn: Ruri no Hōseki; lit. 'Ruri's Jewels'), also known as Introduction to Mineralogy, is a Japanese manga series written and illustrated by Keiichirō Shibuya. The story features high school student Ruri, a girl who loves minerals and jewelry who meets graduate student Nagi, fostering an interest in mineralogy. It has been serialized in Enterbrain's seinen manga magazine Harta since August 2019, with its chapters collected into eight tankōbon volumes as of September 2026. An anime television series adaptation produced by Studio Bind aired from July to September 2025.

== Plot ==
Ruri Tanigawa is a high school student who likes jewelry and accessories. When visiting a jewelry store, she found accessories that used crystals. Ruri was amazed by the beauty of the crystal, and tried to find it herself. One day, while searching for crystals, Ruri meets Nagi Arato, a beautiful college graduate student studying mineralogy. Their encounter deepens Ruri's love and fascination with the world of mineralogy, as they are joined by Nagi's colleague Yōko Imari, and Ruri's classmate and best friend, Shōko Seto.

The characters look for minerals such as quartz, garnet, pyrite, gold and fluorite, and use various mineralogy tools such as a panning dish, a hammer and topographic maps, but eventually come across rarer and more precious minerals such as platinum and gemstones such as sapphire.

== Characters ==
Ruri Tanigawa (谷川 瑠璃, Tanigawa Ruri)
Voiced by: Miyari Nemoto
A rambunctious high school girl whose admiration for gems leads her to take an interest in mineralogy. She's particularly fond of sapphires.
Nagi Arato (荒砥 凪, Arato Nagi)
Voiced by: Asami Seto
A wise young woman and college graduate student who Ruri meets and befriends during her first expedition. She is very dependable and highly knowledgeable about rocks and minerals.
Yōko Imari (伊万里 曜子, Imari Yōko)
Voiced by: Yume Miyamoto
Nagi's underclassman and best friend, with a penchant for historical research. She tends to struggle somewhat with outdoor work, but is still knowledgeable and willing to help the others out at any turn.
Shōko Seto (瀬戸 硝子, Seto Shōko)
Voiced by: Saki Hayashi
Ruri's classmate, who's held a fascination with rocks since a young age, which is revitalized after befriending Ruri and co.
Aoi Kasamaru (笠丸 葵, Kasamaru Aoi)
Voiced by: Misuzu Yamada
Ruri's laid-back best friend.

== Media ==
=== Manga ===
Written and illustrated by Keiichirō Shibuya, Ruri Rocks began serialization in Enterbrain's Harta magazine on August 10, 2019. The first tankōbon volume was released on October 15, 2020. As of September 2026, eight volumes have been released.

==== Volumes ====
No.	Japanese release date	Japanese ISBN
1	October 15, 2020	978-4-04-736267-3
2	August 12, 2021	978-4-04-736615-2
3	October 15, 2022	978-4-04-737177-4
4	August 12, 2023	978-4-04-737637-3
5	September 13, 2024	978-4-04-737914-5
6	July 15, 2025	978-4-04-738113-1
7	September 12, 2025	978-4-04-738393-7
8	September 15, 2026	978-4-04-500129-1

=== Anime ===
An anime television series adaptation was announced on September 11, 2024. It is produced by Studio Bind and directed by Shingo Fujii, with series composition handled by Michiko Yokote, characters designed by Mayu Fujii, and music composed by Daisuke Achiwa and Kazuki Yanagawa. The series aired from July 6 to September 28, 2025, on AT-X and other networks. The opening theme song is "Hikari no Sumika" (光のすみか; lit. 'Home of Light'), performed by Rei Yasuda, while the ending theme song is "Sapphire" (サファイア), performed by Hana Hope. Crunchyroll is streaming the series. Plus Media Networks Asia has licensed the series in Southeast Asia and broadcasts it on Aniplus Asia.

==== Episodes ====
No.	Title	Directed by	Written by	Storyboarded by	Original release date
1	"My First Mineral Hunt"; Transliteration: "Hajimete no Kōbutsu Saishū" (Japanese: はじめての鉱物採集)	Shingo Fujii	Michiko Yokote	Shingo Fujii	July 6, 2025
A young high school girl named Ruri wants a quartz point necklace she cannot afford. She decides to travel to the mountains to find her own crystals. Instead she finds Nagi, a graduate geologist with a Mini Cooper and a medieval European war hammer for sampling recalcitrant formations. With Nagi's help, Ruri obtains a nice quartz cluster; a baggie of pigeon-blood garnets; basic knowledge of pegmatites, plate tectonics, and erosion and transport; and a yen for the earth sciences. Now Ruri wants a rock hammer.
2	"The Value of Golden Color"; Transliteration: "Kin'iro no Kachi" (Japanese: 金色の価値)	Yasuhiko Akiyama	Michiko Yokote	Yasuhiko Akiyama	July 13, 2025
Nagi takes Ruri to a gold prospecting district. Gripped by gold fever, Ruri gains skill with her new rock hammer. But the stones she splits contain only pyrite, confirmed by streak test. A crystal with an unexpected shape prompts a discussion about the difference between cash value and scientific value. Next they pan for placer gold in a stream bed, finding better success after a heavy rain. Searching a pothole yields even more gold, including a huge nugget that Ruri would rather keep than sell.
3	"The Lost Planet"; Transliteration: "Nokosareta Hoshi" (Japanese: 残された恒星(ほし))	Akie Ishii	Michiko Yokote	Akie Ishii	July 20, 2025
Nagi brings Ruri to her messy graduate lab at the university, where Ruri meets Nagi's colleague Yoko. Nagi has published a paper on the unusual pyrite crystal Ruri found and listed Ruri as a co-author. In tidying up the lab, Ruri finds an otherworldly-looking bismuth crystal. Nagi shows her how it was made. Ruri also finds an old topographic map, valuable because it shows a mine not depicted on newer maps. The three girls travel to investigate. A magnet helps identify iron ore in the tailing pile. Falling into a collapsed section of tunnel, they must traverse more tunnels to escape. Nagi's ultraviolet flashlight reveals a galaxy of fluorite crystals not previously recorded. Nagi encourages Yoko to lead a study on them, and tells Ruri that she has clues about the location of a sapphire deposit.
4	"Study of Sands"; Transliteration: "Suna o Himotoku" (Japanese: 砂を繙く)	Yurika Tsushima	Michiko Yokote	Yurika Tsushima	July 27, 2025
As Ruri searches through sand samples for sapphire microcrystals, Nagi explains that river sand recaps the geology of all upstream drainages. Examining sand from each tributary and recording both positive and negative results will eventually lead to the source of the sapphires. But the method requires hours of work on the binocular microscope. Ruri finds a shortcut by running a magnet over the sample to remove the magnetic fraction. Yoko works on her fluorites, which may contain tungsten. Ruri's friends begin to wonder how she's spending her free time.
5	"Worlds Seen and Unseen"; Transliteration: "Mieru Sekai, Miezaru Sekai" (Japanese: 見える世界、見えざる世界)	Miton	Naoto Taniuchi	Mamoru Kurosawa	August 3, 2025
Ruri, Yoko, and Nagi search a gravel beach, finding banded agates and other forms of quartz. Nagi speaks of rocks as fascinating clues to the formation and history of the world. A fleck of silvery metal proves anomalously dense in a simple test. It might be platinum, which is less rare in serpentinite from the Earth's mantle. Nagi provides a short review of volcanism and plate tectonics. In the mountains they find a big shiny block of serpentinite, and more platinum grains in a nearby stream.
6	"A Closer Look Into the Blue"; Transliteration: "Sono Ao o Mitsumete" (Japanese: その青をみつめて)	Hironori Tanaka	Miharu Hirami	Hironori Tanaka	August 10, 2025
Ruri has identified the watershed with the sapphire deposit. She, Nagi, and Yoko travel to the area and visit a shrine. Searching on foot nearby seems hopeless, partly because fallen leaves cover the ground. Ruri finds a mistake in her notes. More sand searches correct the error and further pinpoint the deposit. Climbing to a ridgeline, they find plentiful sapphires. Nagi explains how they might have come to be there. An old inscription hints at a missed clue in the shrine's name. Shown but not mentioned: Ruri's shoes and clothes are now more suitable for outdoor work.
7	"Seaside Recycling Studio"; Transliteration: "Nagisa no Risaikuru Kōbō" (Japanese: 渚のリサイクル工房)	Masaho Hori	Shingo Fujii	Shinpei Sawa	August 17, 2025
Ruri's classmate Shoko loves rocks, but receives no support until she encounters Ruri and company investigating sea glass. We learn different ways for silica glass to gain colors, including by thin-film interference. A day of searching for old bottles on the beach gains Shoko new friends with a shared interest. Ruri learns that her name is an old word for blue glass.
8	"The Golden Elegy"; Transliteration: "Tasogareiro no Erejī" (Japanese: 黄昏色のエレジー)	Tomio Yamauchi & Yasuhiko Akiyama	Miharu Hirami	Mamoru Kurosawa	August 24, 2025
Shoko, whose shirt commemorates nihonium, explores water quality for her school science project. Ruri wants in on it. Between samples, Shoko finds and then loses an orange crystal. Yoko checks water quality as well, using it to locate a new fluorite deposit. More water tests lead the investigators to an abandoned factory. Inside, they find rare orange zincite. It serves as a pretty decoration and a symbol of Shoko's and Ruri's friendship.
9	"Time Capsule of 1.9 Million Tons"; Transliteration: "Hyakukyūjūman Ton no Taimu Kapuseru" (Japanese: 190万トンのタイムカプセル)	Miton	Naoto Taniuchi	Miton	August 31, 2025
Ruri is disappointed when a reported opal deposit turns out to be fully mined out. Record rains deliver cultural waste to the riverbank, along with unexpected quartz and pyrite. Nagi puts on an impromptu fashion show. The team returns to the river. They search upstream and discover the source of the quartz and pyrite. Further on, at a dam site, they find plentiful opals concentrated by water flow.
10	"Sentence to an Abandoned Railroad"; Transliteration: "Wansentensu no Haisenro" (Japanese: ワンセンテンスの廃線路)	Akie Ishii	Michiko Yokote	Akie Ishii	September 7, 2025
The geologists set out for a historical manganese mine, with Yoko hesitantly in the lead, after Nagi has to miss out due to a last-minute excursion. We learn some properties and uses of manganese. Blocked by a collapsed rail tunnel, the team searches for fallen samples along the tracks. They discover rhodonite and rhodochrosite in quantity, suggesting prohibited use of potentially toxic tailings as track ballast. Perhaps a long-ago rail crew used their cargo for emergency repairs, though the actual answer remains unknown.
11	"The Sapphire Cradle"; Transliteration: "Safaia no Yurikago" (Japanese: サファイアのゆりかご)	Yurika Tsushima	Miharu Hirami	Yurika Tsushima	September 14, 2025
Ruri cannot decide which elective courses to take. Yoko makes "thin slates" and examines them in polarized light. Ruri applies the technique to her sapphires to learn about their formation. Returning to the field, she seeks bits of the crystals' original host rock. Testing with hydrochloric acid reveals calcite. More searching in correlation with the story of the old shrine yields many more sapphires and a plausible model of their history. With more confidence and clearer self-knowledge, Ruri chooses to study Earth science.
12	"Memories Come with Rocks and Noise"; Transliteration: "Omoide wa Ishi to Noizu to" (Japanese: 想い出は石とノイズと)	Ayumu Uwano	Shingo Fujii & Michiko Yokote	Yasuhiko Akiyama	September 21, 2025
Among her grandfather's old things, Ruri finds a contraption of copper wires and crystals. Nagi identifies it as a crystal radio. Ruri, Shoko, and new friend Aoi try to recreate it, but struggle to find the right mineral for the detector. A germanium diode works, confirming the build is correct. A nearby shrine with connections to Ruri's family offers better reception.
13	"Look Up, Examine, Search! And Next!"; Transliteration: "Miagete Nozoite Sagashite, Tsugi!" (Japanese: 見上げて覗いて探して、次！)	Shingo Fujii	Michiko Yokote	Shingo Fujii	September 28, 2025
The geologists visit a classy hot-spring hotel. A white stone ring proves to be lime from the spring deposited in a pipe. Nagi speaks of career opportunities for geologists. At night they watch for shooting stars. Nagi reveals that rooftop dust may contain micrometeorites that can be harvested with a magnet. With the aid of a microscope, they find a cosmic spherule. Ruri reflects on the fun of scientific discovery and looks forward to more.
