= Ruriko =

- Gender: Female

Origin
- Origin: Japanese
- Meaning: Different meanings depending on the kanji used

Ruriko (written: 瑠璃子, るり子 or ルリ子) is a feminine Japanese given name. Notable people with the name include:

- Ruriko Aoki (青木 瑠璃子), Japanese voice actress and singer
- Ruriko Asaoka (浅丘 ルリ子; born 1940), Japanese actress
- Ruriko Kikuchi (菊池 るり子), Japanese classical pianist
- Ruriko Kojima (小島 瑠璃子; born 1993), Japanese television personality, gravure idol and sportscaster
- Ruriko Kubo (久保 瑠里子; born 1989), Japanese Japanese middle-distance runner
- Ruriko Noguchi (野口 瑠璃子; born 1995), Japanese voice actress
- Ruriko Yoshida, Japanese-American mathematician and statistician

== See also ==
- 4455 Ruriko, a main-belt asteroid named for Ruriko Ueda, wife of one of the discoverers
