= Yoshinobu Yamakawa =

Japanese anime director (born 1968)

- 山川(やまかわ)吉樹(よしのぶ)
- Born: February 9, 1968 (age 58); Tokyo, Japan
- Other name: Yoshiki Yamakawa
- Occupations: Animation director, animator and character designer
- Years active: 1994–present
- Employer: J.C.Staff
- Notable work: The Duke of Death and His Maid; Kill Me Baby; Di Gi Charat

Yoshinobu Yamakawa (Note: His name sometimes translates to Yoshiki Yoshikawa) (Japanese: 山川(やまかわ)吉樹(よしのぶ) (Note: His old names were "山川良志信", "山川よしのぶ" and "山川世忍"), Hepburn: Yamakawa Yoshinobu) is a Japanese anime animator, director, and character designer.

== Biography ==
Yamakawa was born on February 9, 1968, in Tokyo, Japan. He graduated from a mechanical engineering course in a technical high school.

== Works ==
=== TV anime ===
Year	Title	Role	Ref
1995	The Slayers	Animator	
1996	Saber Marionette J	Animator, Small Items Design	
1997	Tenchi in Tokyo	Animator, Small Items Design	
1999	Excel Saga	Episode Storyboard Artist (Episode 5)	
1999	Di Gi Charat	Character Design, Chief Animation Director	
1999	Sorcerous Stabber Orphen	Episode Storyboard Artist (Episode 9, 18)	
2003	Di Gi Charat Nyo!	Character Design, Animation Director	
2003	Nanaka 6/17	Character Designer (Note: Magical Domiko characters only)	
2006	Mushishi	Episode Storyboard Artist (Episode 15)	
2009	First Love Limited	Director	
2012	Kill Me Baby	Director	
2012	Little Busters!	Director	
2013	Little Busters! Refrain	Director	
2015	Is It Wrong to Try to Pick Up Girls in a Dungeon?	Director	
2017	Alice & Zoroku	Episode Storyboard Artist (Episode 2, 4–5, 10), Episode Director (Episode 10)	
2017	Children of the Whales	Episode Storyboard Artist (Episode 11)	
2018	Hi Score Girl	Director	
2019	High Score Girl Season 2	Director	
2021	The Duke of Death and His Maid	Director	
2023	The Duke of Death and His Maid Season 2	Director	
2024	The Duke of Death and His Maid Season 3	Director	

=== Anime Movie ===
Year	Title	Role	Ref
1999	Cyber Team in Akihabara: Summer Vacation of 2011	Character Design, Animation Director	
2001	Di Gi Charat - A Trip to the Planet	Character Designer	
2008	Hells	Director	

=== Original Video Animation ===
Year	Title	Role	Ref
2013	Kill Me Baby	Director	
2014	Little Busters! EX	Director	

=== Web Anime ===
Year	Title	Role	Ref
2018	B: The Beginning	Director	
2024	Murai no Koi	Director	

== Recognitions ==
Year	Award	Category	Recipient	Result	Ref
2008	12th Japan Media Arts Festival Awards	Animation Division	Hells Angels (Directed by Yamakawa)	Jury Recommended Works (Long Animation)	
