= The Duke of Death and His Maid =

Japanese manga series

- First tankōbon volume cover, featuring Alice Lendrott (left) and Viktor (right)

死神坊ちゃんと黒メイド (Shinigami Botchan to Kuro Meido)
- Genre: Romantic comedy; Supernatural
- Manga
- Written by: Koharu Inoue
- Published by: Shogakukan
- English publisher: NA: Seven Seas Entertainment
- Magazine: Sunday Webry
- Original run: October 3, 2017 – May 17, 2022
- Volumes: 16
- Anime television series
- Directed by: Yoshinobu Yamakawa
- Written by: Hideki Shirane
- Music by: Gen Okuda; Takeshi Watanabe
- Studio: J.C.Staff (animation); SMDE (CGI)
- Licensed by: Crunchyroll (Note: In North America through Crunchyroll, LLC (formerly known as Funimation), in the United Kingdom through Crunchyroll UK and Ireland (formerly known as Manga Entertainment) and in Australia through Madman Anime); SEA: Plus Media Networks Asia
- Original network: Tokyo MX, BS11, ytv
- English network: SEA: Aniplus Asia
- Original run: July 4, 2021 – June 23, 2024
- Episodes: 36
- icon

The Duke of Death and His Maid (Japanese: 死神坊ちゃんと黒メイド, Hepburn: Shinigami Botchan to Kuro Meido) is a Japanese romantic comedy manga series by Koharu Inoue. It was serialized online via Shogakukan's Sunday Webry website from October 2017 to May 2022, with its chapters collected in sixteen tankōbon volumes. An anime television series adaptation produced by J.C.Staff aired from July to September 2021. A second season aired from July to September 2023. A third and final season aired from April to June 2024.

== Plot ==
A young noble named Viktor is cursed as a child by a witch, causing him to kill anything he touches. As a result, his mother disowns him, and sends him to live in a separate estate with only a maid named Alice and a butler. Viktor and Alice knew each other since they were children. Although Alice is Viktor's maid, they love each other. However, they do not know each other's intentions at first. Viktor's best friend and he himself thinks he is a monster. Viktor wanted to give Alice a white rose, but it would soon wither in his hands. Alice took the withered white rose from his hand, explaining to him that in the language of flowers a withered white rose means "to stay together until death". In the process, the noble becomes close to Alice, and she to him. He tries to adapt to living with the curse and attempts to find out about the person who cursed him. He makes new friends and his relationship with families gradually improves. One day, he will put a ring on Alice's ring finger by himself.

== Characters ==
The Duke (坊ちゃん, Botchan) / Viktor (Junior) (ヴィクター, Vikutā)
Voiced by: Natsuki Hanae (Japanese); Clifford Chapin (English)
A young noble who was bewitched since childhood with a curse that kills anything he touches. Because of it, he is disowned by his mother and sent to live in a separate estate inside a forest with only a butler and his maid Alice.
Alice Lendrott (アリス・レンドロット, Arisu Rendorotto)
Voiced by: Ayumi Mano (Japanese); Kristen McGuire (English)
Viktor's childhood friend and personal maid who is infatuated with him. Despite knowing that touching Viktor can kill her, Alice likes to flirt with him, usually with comical results.
Rob (ロブ, Robu)
Voiced by: Hōchū Ōtsuka (Japanese); Kent Williams (English)
Viktor's old butler and his only servant besides Alice.
Viola (ヴィオラ, Viora)
Voiced by: Inori Minase (Japanese); Kayli Mills (English)
Viktor's youngest sister, Viola likes older men and has feelings for Rob, usually visiting her brother's house just to see him.
Walter (ウォルター, Uorutā)
Voiced by: Yuma Uchida (Japanese); Alan Lee (English)
Viktor's younger brother who was chosen to replace him as the family's heir. Despite that, Walter always has a feeling of inferiority towards his brother and always attempts to surpass him.
Cuff (カフ, Kafu)
Voiced by: Wakana Kuramochi (Japanese); Sarah Wiedenheft (English)
A young witch who befriends Viktor and Alice. Cuff is skilled with fire magic and works in a circus with Zain. Cuff views the world with a sense of immaturity, and child-like wonder (as evidenced by her affinity for Santa Claus). It is hinted that she has feelings for Zain.
Zain (ザイン)
Voiced by: Hiroshi Kamiya (Japanese); Ricco Fajardo (English)
A wizard with bird features and a perverted behavior who is Cuff's companion. Zain always attempts to flirt with Cuff, who rejects him at first but eventually warms up to him. Zain is skilled with time magic, a rare and powerful trait that makes him the target of other witches.
Daleth (ダレス, Daresu)
Voiced by: Yoko Hikasa (Japanese); Katelyn Barr (English)
The leader of the witches, replacing her older sister Sade. Like Cuff and Zain, Daleth also befriends Viktor and Alice, helping them to look for a way to break the curse. In the past, she was disfigured by Sade and since then she disguises her head with a skull-like mask in shame, until Walter compliments her true face, which also makes her fall in love with him.
Sharon Lendrott (シャロン・レンドロット, Sharon Rendorotto)
Voiced by: Kikuko Inoue (Japanese); Felecia Angelle (English)
Alice's mother who somehow has a connection with the witches, despite not being one of them. Years ago, she was apparently killed by Sade but revives later in the story, reuniting with her daughter.
Gerbera (ガーベラ, Gābera)
Voiced by: Sayaka Ohara (Japanese); Michelle Rojas (English)
Viktor's mother who disowned him after he was cursed. Behind her strict facade, she still cares for her son and wants him to break his curse so that he can return to the family. She is good friends with Sharon.
Sade (シャーデー, Shādē)
Voiced by: Yūko Kaida (Japanese); Dawn M. Bennett (English)
The main antagonist and former leader of the witches. Sade is responsible for several acts of cruelty such as the duke's curse, Daleth's scar and Sharon's apparent death. It is stated that she died many years ago but traces of her magic are usually seen, as a sign that she was not completely destroyed yet.
It later turns out Sade faked her death to keep the timeline of Victor and Alice falling in love intact; having been touched they thanked her, upon meeting in the past. She later helps Daleth become mortal, so she can wed Walter, even assuring the duchess of their lineage, so she cannot disagree.
Ringmaster (座長, Zachō)
Voiced by: Masaaki Mizunaka (Japanese); Anthony Bowling (English)
The ringmaster of Circus Gemini. He is also the husband of Amelia, whom he rescued a decade ago.
Amelia (アメリア, Ameria)
Voiced by: Reina Ueda (Japanese); Julie Shields (English)
The octopus witch and the wife of the Ringmaster.
Niko (ニコ)
Voiced by: Natsumi Fujiwara (Japanese); Hayden Daviau (English)
A wizard who is cursed with immortality by Sade years before her death. Niko is the headmaster of his wizardry school.
Ichi (イチ)
Voiced by: Masako Katsuki (Japanese); Monica Rial (English)
A wizardess and the lover of Niko. She is highly skilled with water magic.
Free (フリー, Furī) (Note: Known as Flea in the English release of the anime series.)
Voiced by: Mitsuo Iwata (Japanese); Ben Phillips (English)
An instructor of Niko's wizardry school. Despite the fact that Free is actually a witch, he highly admires Niko and addresses him as "Brother Niko" and emulates Niko as he shape shifts into an older carbon-copy of his physical appearance.
Viktor (Senior) (ヴィクトル, Vikutoru)
Voiced by: Banjo Ginga (Japanese); Shawn Gann (English)
The grandfather of Viola, Walter and the Duke, who was named after him.
Liz (リズ, Rizu)
Voiced by: Mai Nakahara (Japanese); Sara Ragsdale (English)
The grandmother of the Duke, Viola and Walter. Liz and her husband Viktor are depicted in a painting in the Duke's ancestral home.

== Media ==
=== Manga ===
Written and illustrated by Koharu Inoue, The Duke of Death and His Maid was serialized on Shogakukan's Sunday Webry website from October 3, 2017, to May 17, 2022. Shogakukan collected its chapters in sixteen tankōbon volumes, released from January 12, 2018, to July 12, 2022.

In July 2021, Seven Seas Entertainment announced that it had licensed the series for English release.

==== Volumes ====
No.	Original release date	Original ISBN	English release date	English ISBN
1	January 12, 2018	978-4-09-128099-2	May 31, 2022	978-1-63858-410-0
2	April 12, 2018	978-4-09-128222-4	August 9, 2022	978-1-63858-417-9
3	August 9, 2018	978-4-09-128480-8	October 11, 2022	978-1-63858-724-8
4	November 12, 2018	978-4-09-128697-0	December 20, 2022	978-1-63858-843-6
5	February 12, 2019	978-4-09-128856-1	March 14, 2023	978-1-63858-987-7
6	June 18, 2019	978-4-09-129192-9	May 30, 2023	978-1-68579-578-8
7	September 12, 2019	978-4-09-129357-2	July 25, 2023	978-1-68579-812-3
8	December 12, 2019	978-4-09-129427-2	September 12, 2023	979-8-88843-012-5
9	May 12, 2020	978-4-09-850106-9	November 14, 2023	979-8-88843-045-3
10	October 12, 2020	978-4-09-850191-5	January 2, 2024	979-8-88843-097-2
11	February 12, 2021	978-4-09-850402-2	March 12, 2024	979-8-88843-389-8
12	May 12, 2021	978-4-09-850547-0	May 14, 2024	979-8-88843-482-6
13	July 12, 2021	978-4-09-850657-6	July 16, 2024	979-8-88843-663-9
14	November 12, 2021	978-4-09-850805-1	September 10, 2024	979-8-89160-055-3
15	June 10, 2022	978-4-09-851137-2	November 5, 2024	979-8-89160-056-0
16	July 12, 2022	978-4-09-851218-8	January 7, 2025	979-8-89160-057-7

=== Anime ===
An anime television series adaptation produced by J.C.Staff was announced in February 2021. The CGI-centric anime series was directed by Yoshinobu Yamakawa, with Hideki Shirane overseeing the series' scripts, Michiru Kuwabata designing the characters, and Gen Okuda and Takeshi Watanabe composing the series' music. The series was broadcast on Tokyo MX, BS11, and ytv. The first season aired from July 4 to September 19, 2021. At the end of the first-season finale, a second season was announced; it aired from July 9 to September 24, 2023. At the end of the second-season finale, a third and final season was announced; it aired from April 7 to June 23, 2024.

Funimation (later Crunchyroll) streamed the series outside of Asia. Plus Media Networks Asia licensed the series in Southeast Asia and aired it on Aniplus Asia.

== Reception ==
By September 2023, the manga had over 1.8 million copies in circulation.

Cartoon Cipher of Anime News Network (ANN) praises the first season of the anime for defying his initial expectations by blending teasing with heartfelt wholesomeness and effective world-building and adding that the anime balances lighthearted moments with a deeper exploration of its world, depicting the Duke's secluded life as a refuge from harsh realities. He also noted that the CG animation maintained the original manga's expressive style despite some choppiness. He concludes that the show offers a surprising amount of love and wholesomeness, suggesting it should be approached as a romance rather than a dark fantasy. MrAJCosplay of ANN commented the pacing flaws of the third season adding that after the first episode, the story stagnates for five episodes which affects overall the story telling and rhythm hindering the narrative's flow. He commented the third season the lacks the same visual dynamism as the previous seasons. He praises the voice acting for being strongly well-delivered. He also praises the second half of the season noting that it is "a perfect blend of narrative progression and emotional pathos."

== See also ==
- Pushing Daisies, an American television series with a similar premise
