= BNW =

BNW may refer to:

- "BNW" trio, rivals of the 1993 Japanese Classic Races consisting of Biwa Hayahide, Narita Taishin, and Winning Ticket.
- Brave New Waves, a Canadian radio show (1984–2007)
- Brave New Workshop, a comedy club in Minneapolis, US
- Brave New World, a 1932 dystopian novel
- Bootle New Strand railway station, England

== See also ==
- Brave New World (disambiguation)
