= Narita =

Narita may refer to:

== Places ==
- Narita, Chiba, a city in Japan
  - Narita International Airport, secondary international airport serving the Greater Tokyo Area
  - Narita-san, temple in the city
  - Narita Line
    - Narita Station

== People ==
=== Given name ===
- Narita Takaki, footballer

=== Surname ===
- Narita (surname), a Japanese surname

== Other uses ==
- Narita (album)
- Narita (Nader), a character in Ice Blade
- Racehorses owned by Hidenori Yamaji
  - Narita Brian
  - Narita Taishin
  - Narita Top Road

== See also ==
- Naruto
