= San Jose International Airport =

Airport in San Jose, California, United States

San Jose Mineta International Airport
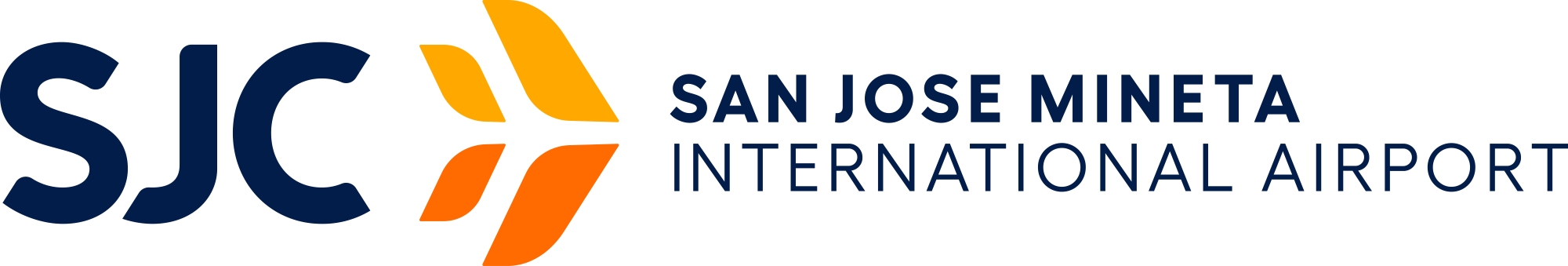

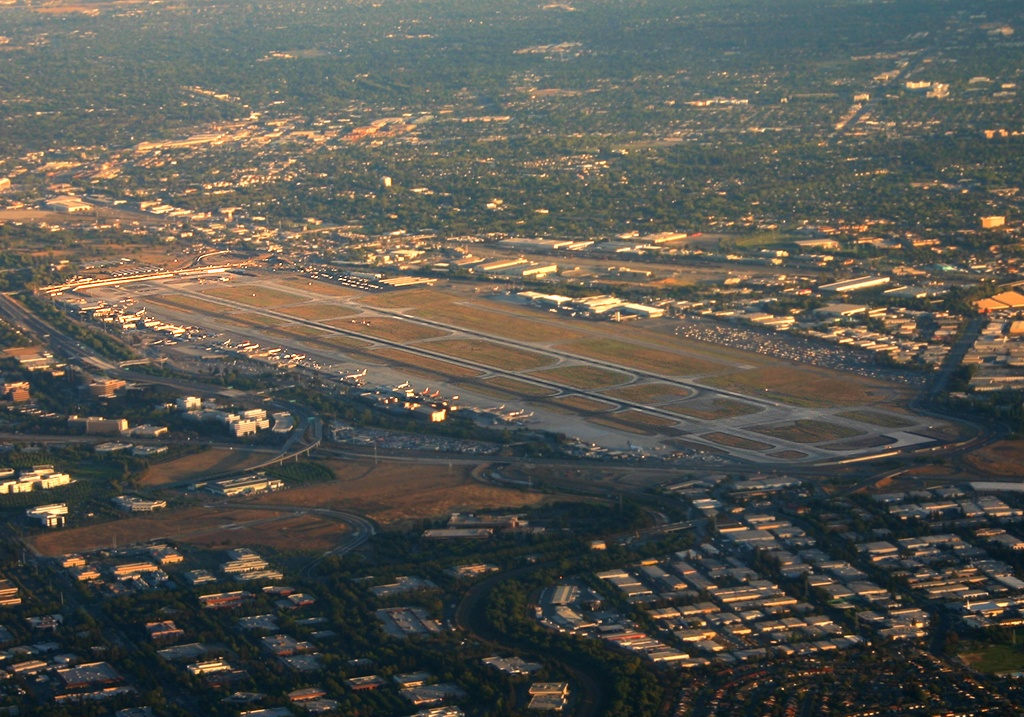
- Aerial view, 2004
- IATA: SJC; ICAO: KSJC; FAA LID: SJC

Summary
- Airport type: Public
- Owner/Operator: City of San Jose
- Serves: San Jose; Santa Clara County; San Francisco Bay Area
- Location: San Jose, California, U.S.
- Opened: 1939; 87 years ago
- Elevation AMSL: 62 ft (19 m)
- Coordinates: 37°21′47″N 121°55′43″W
- Website: www.flysanjose.com

Maps
- FAA airport diagram
- Interactive map of San Jose Mineta International Airport

Runways
Direction	Length		Surface
Direction	ft	m	Surface
12L/30R	11,000	3,353	Asphalt
12R/30L	11,000	3,353	Asphalt

Statistics (2025)
- Passengers: 10,675,167 ▼9.9%
- Aircraft movements (2024): 164,886
- Sources: www.flysjc.com, FAA Airport Master Record

San José Mineta International Airport (IATA: SJC, ICAO: KSJC, FAA LID: SJC)—officially Norman Y. Mineta San Jose International Airport—is a city-owned public airport in San Jose, California. Located 3 mi (4.8 km) northwest of Downtown San Jose, the airport serves the city, Santa Clara County, and the greater Bay Area. It is named after San Jose native Norman Mineta, former United States Secretary of Transportation and United States Secretary of Commerce, who also served as Mayor of San Jose and as a San Jose City Councilman.

While San Jose is the largest city in the Bay Area, SJC is the Bay Area's second-busiest airport by passenger boarding, behind San Francisco International Airport (SFO). In addition, the airport is also an official U.S. Customs and Border Protection international port of entry. It is situated three miles northwest of Downtown San Jose near the intersections of U.S. Route 101, Interstate 880, and State Route 87. In 2021, 54% of departing or arriving passengers at SJC flew on Southwest Airlines; Alaska Airlines was the second most popular airline, with about 19% of passengers.

== Overview ==
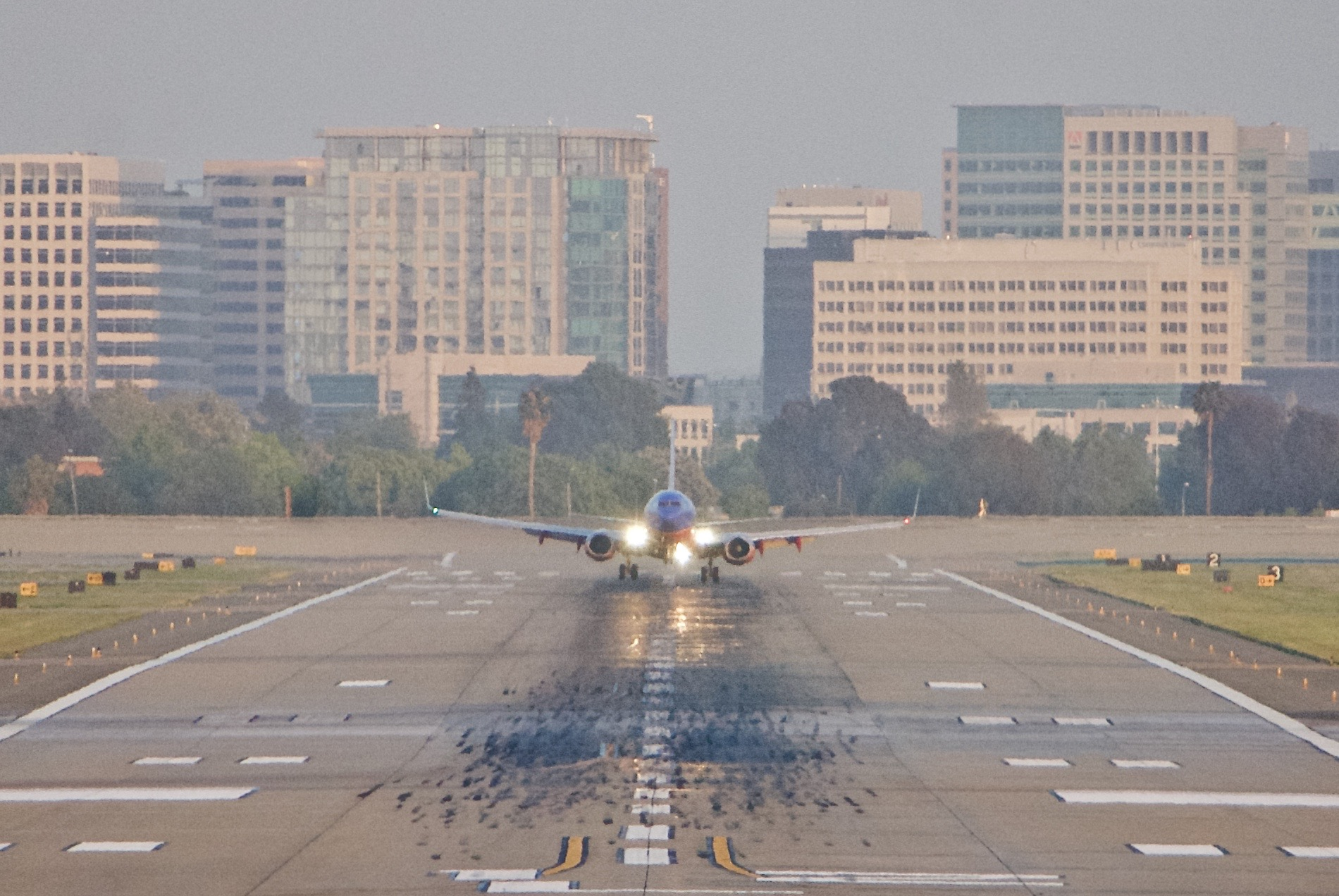
Boeing 737 landing at SJC with Downtown San Jose behind

While San Jose is the largest city in the Bay Area by both population and area, SJC is the second-busiest of the three Bay Area airports by passenger count after SFO. SJC served 14.3 million passengers in 2018, surpassing its previous record of 14.2 million passengers set in 2001. Since 2012, SJC has experienced one of the fastest rates of seat capacity growth among major airports in the United States, reaching a peak of 15.7 million passengers in 2019.

SJC is near downtown San Jose (less than 4 miles (6.4 km) from the city center and easily within city limits), unlike SFO and OAK, which are around 14 miles (23 km) and 10 miles (16 km) from their downtowns. The location near downtown San Jose is convenient, but SJC is surrounded by the city and has little room for expansion. The proximity to downtown limits the height of buildings in downtown San Jose, to comply with FAA rules.

== History ==
=== Beginnings and expansion ===
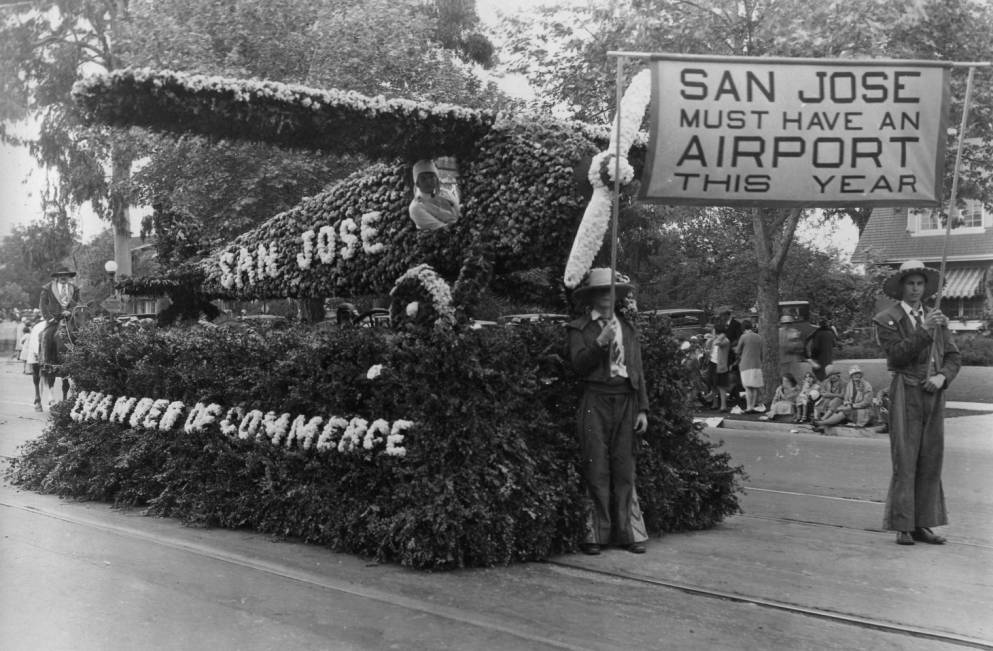
San Jose Must Have An Airport – 1929

In 1939, Ernie Renzel, a wholesale grocer and future mayor of San Jose, led a group that negotiated an option to buy 483 acres (195 ha) of the Stockton Ranch from the Crocker family, to be the site of San Jose's airport. Renzel led the effort to pass a bond measure to pay for the land in 1940. In 1945, test pilot James M. Nissen and two partners leased about 16 acres (6.5 ha) of this land to build a runway, hangar and office building for a flight school. When the city of San Jose decided to develop a municipal airport, Nissen sold his share of the aviation business and became San Jose's first airport manager. Renzel and Nissen were instrumental in the development of San Jose Municipal Airport over the next few decades, culminating with the 1965 opening of what later became Terminal C.

San Jose's first airline flights were Southwest Airways Douglas DC-3s on the multistop run between San Francisco and Los Angeles, starting in 1948. Southwest changed its name to Pacific Air Lines and was the only airline at the airport until 1966, when Pacific Southwest Airlines (PSA) started flying Lockheed L-188 Electras nonstop from LAX and Boeing 727-100s later that year. SJC's first airline jets were Pacific Air Lines Boeing 727-100 nonstops to LAX earlier in 1966; Pacific 727s flew nonstop to Las Vegas in 1967. Pacific also flew Fairchild F-27s to SJC, and merged with Bonanza Air Lines and West Coast Airlines to form Air West which was renamed Hughes Airwest, continuing at SJC with McDonnell Douglas DC-9-30s before it merged into Republic Airlines (1979–1986). In 1968, United Airlines arrived, with Boeing 727 nonstops from Denver, Chicago and LAX, and Douglas DC-8 nonstops from New York and Baltimore.

The runway which became 12R/30L was 4,500 feet (1,400 m) until about 1962— Brokaw Rd was the northwest boundary of the airport. In 1964 it was 6,312 feet (1,924 m), in 1965 it was 7,787 feet (2,373 m), and a few years later it reached 8,900 feet (2,700 m), where it stayed until around 1991. The two runways are now both 11,000 feet (3,400 m) in length.

In the early 1980s, the airport was one of the first in the country to participate in the noise regulation program enacted by the U.S. Congress for delineation of airport noise contours and developing a pilot study of residential sound insulation. This program showed that homes near the airport could be retrofitted cost-effectively to reduce indoor aircraft noise substantially.

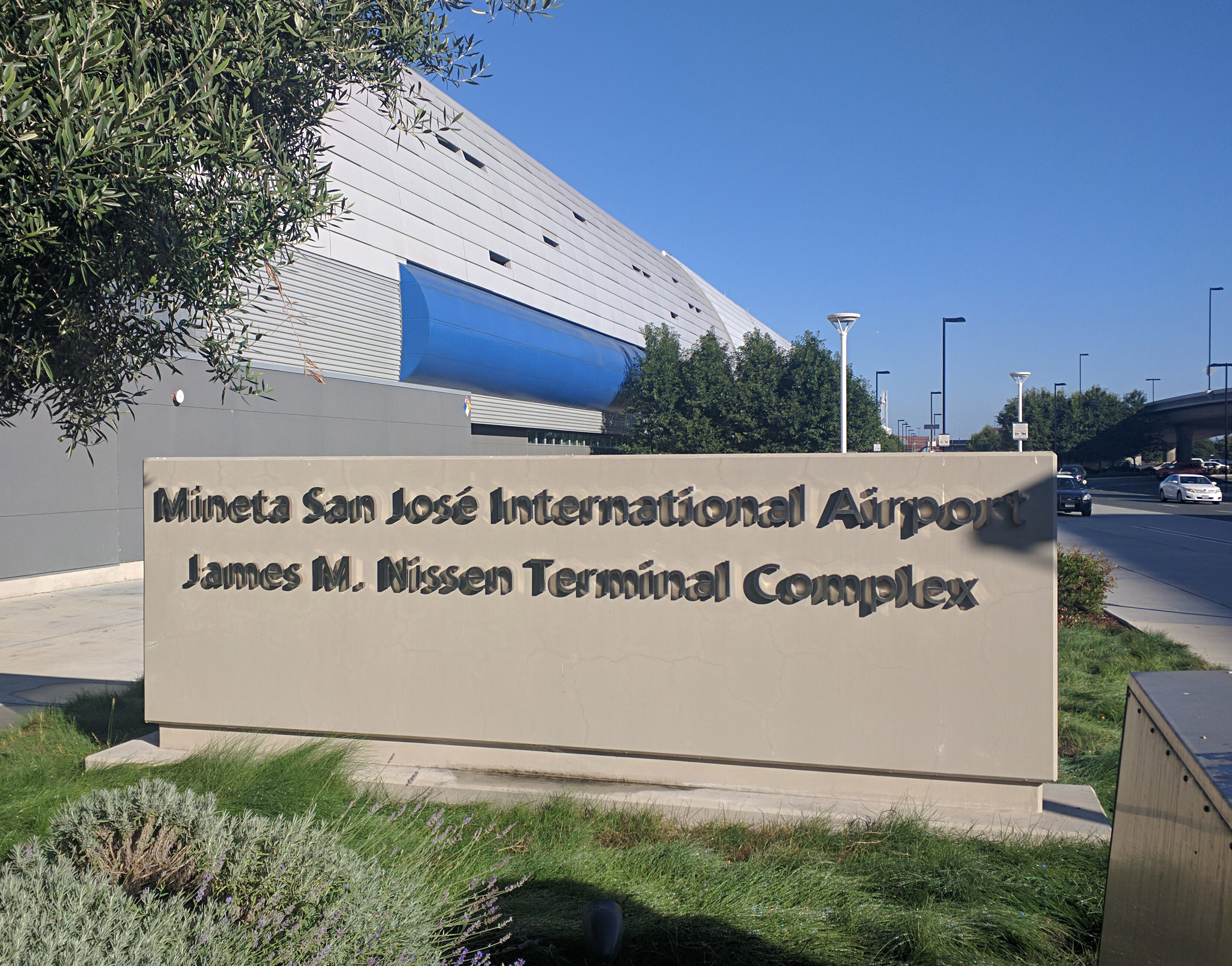
The James M. Nissen Terminal Complex, spanning the space between terminals A and B

=== 1988–2010: boom and bust ===
American Airlines opened a hub at San Jose in 1988, using slots it obtained in the buyout of AirCal (formerly Air California) in 1986. In 1990, Terminal A was opened to help accommodate the American operation. The company launched a flight to Tokyo using McDonnell Douglas DC-10s in March 1991. This was San Jose's first direct link to Asia. The aircraft proved ill-suited for the route; the San Jose airport's short runway prevented the planes from taking off with a full cabin and fuel tanks. Consequently, American replaced the DC-10s with McDonnell Douglas MD-11s.

Amid financial losses and intense competition with Southwest Airlines, American closed its San Jose hub in 1993. Reno Air then opened a San Jose hub using the gates previously occupied by American as well as a marketing agreement with American. Reno Air was profitable in 1996 but suffered financial losses in 1997, and American acquired Reno Air in 1998, thereby re-establishing a hub in San Jose.

In April 2001, American commenced a route to Paris, the airport's first transatlantic flight. The airline operated the service with a Boeing 767. By the summer of that year, the airline served Paris, Taipei, and Tokyo nonstop from San Jose and had domestic flights to Austin, Boston, Denver, Honolulu, Las Vegas, Maui, Orange County, Portland, Phoenix, San Diego and Seattle.

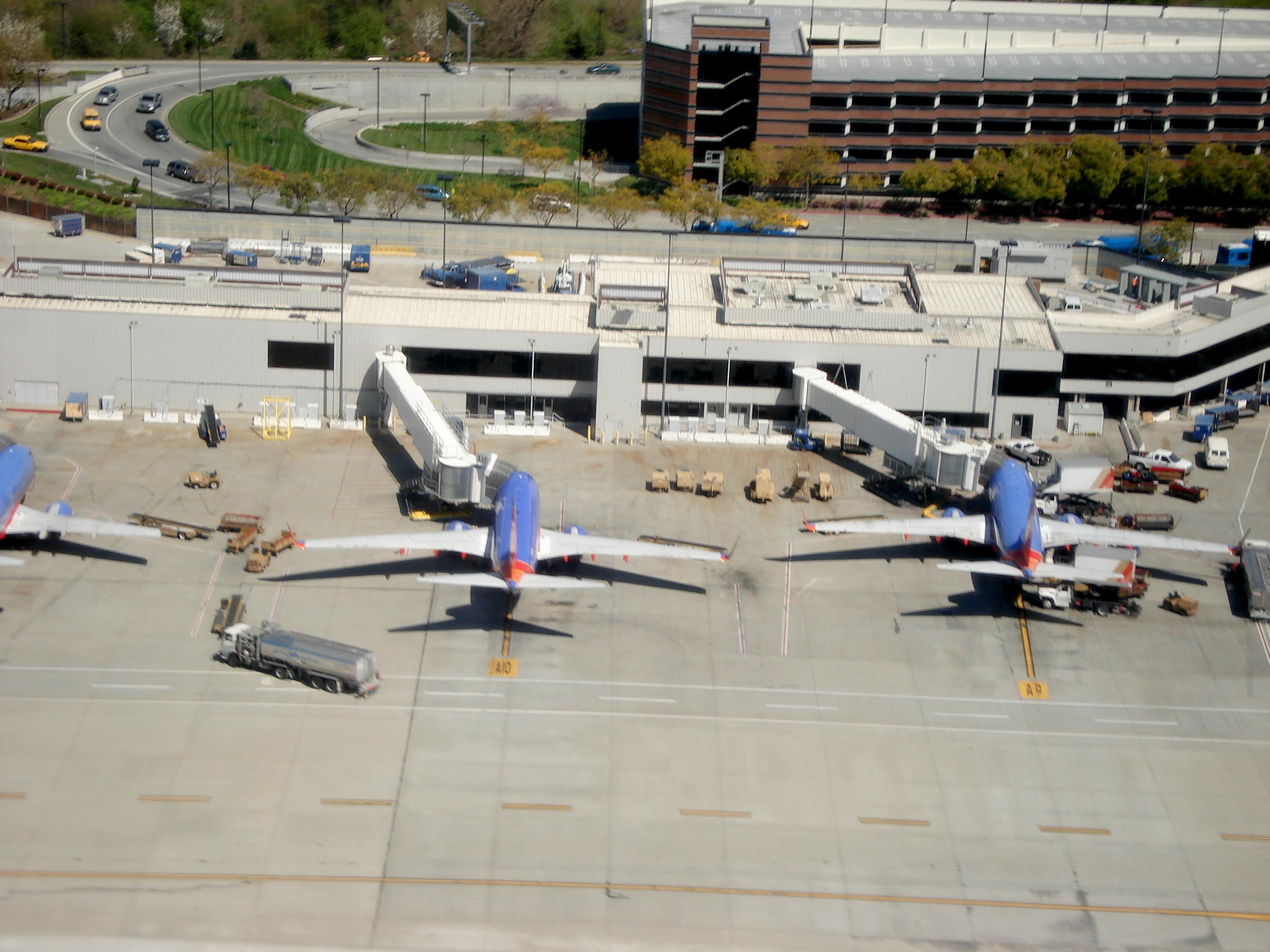
A group of Southwest Airlines Boeing 737 aircraft parked at Terminal A with parking structure behind

In November 2001, the airport was renamed after Norman Y. Mineta, a native of San Jose, its former mayor and congressman, as well as both a former United States Secretary of Commerce and a United States Secretary of Transportation. That same month, the San Jose City Council approved an amended master plan for the airport that called for a three-phase, nine-year expansion plan. The plan, designed by Gensler and The Steinberg Group, called for a single, consolidated "Central Terminal" with 40 gates (four more than present), an international concourse and expanded security areas. The sail-shaped facade would greet up to 17.6 million passengers a year. A people mover system would link the new terminal with VTA light rail and the planned BART station next to the Santa Clara Caltrain station. Cargo facilities would be moved to the east side of the airport. A long term parking garage would be built where the rental car operations are now. A short term parking lot would be built on the site of Terminal C. On December 16, 2003, the San Jose Airport Commission named the airfield after former mayor Ernie Renzel and named the future Central Terminal after James Nissen. In August 2004, the city broke ground on the North Concourse, the first phase of the master plan.

The originally-approved master plan was scaled-back in 2005. The new two-phase plan called for a simplified Terminal B, rather than the initially proposed James Nissen Central Terminal, with a North Concourse to replace the aging Terminal C. In addition, Terminal A would be expanded for additional check-in counters, security checkpoints, and drop-off/pick-up curbside space. The new plan cost $1.3 billion, less than half of the original plan's $3 billion. The first phase was completed on June 30, 2010, when Terminal B and the North Concourse officially opened for service. Planning for Phase II began in early 2018, with 6 additional gates to be added along with a new concourse extension at the south end of Terminal B.

Service reductions continued throughout the early 2000s. Alaska Airlines halted its Puerto Vallarta and Cabo San Lucas seasonal routes, Horizon Air ended its Tucson service and American Airlines ended its San Luis Obispo and Boston Logan links. Some additions still occurred. In October 2005, Hawaiian Airlines began daily nonstops to Honolulu. In October 2006, American Airlines ended the San Jose–Tokyo Narita route.

SJC suffered with many mid-tier airports during the 2008 rise in oil prices as airlines reduced marginal services. The airport lost much of its transcontinental U.S. service in the fall with Continental ending Newark flights, JetBlue ending Boston nonstops, and United ending flights to its Chicago–O'Hare and Washington Dulles hubs. The New York Times reported that between 2007 and 2009, SJC lost 22% of its seat capacity. Frontier Airlines pulled out of SJC in May 2010, citing lack of profitability on its single flight from the airport to Denver, Colorado. In August 2010, Mexicana Airlines also suspended all flights permanently due to bankruptcy.

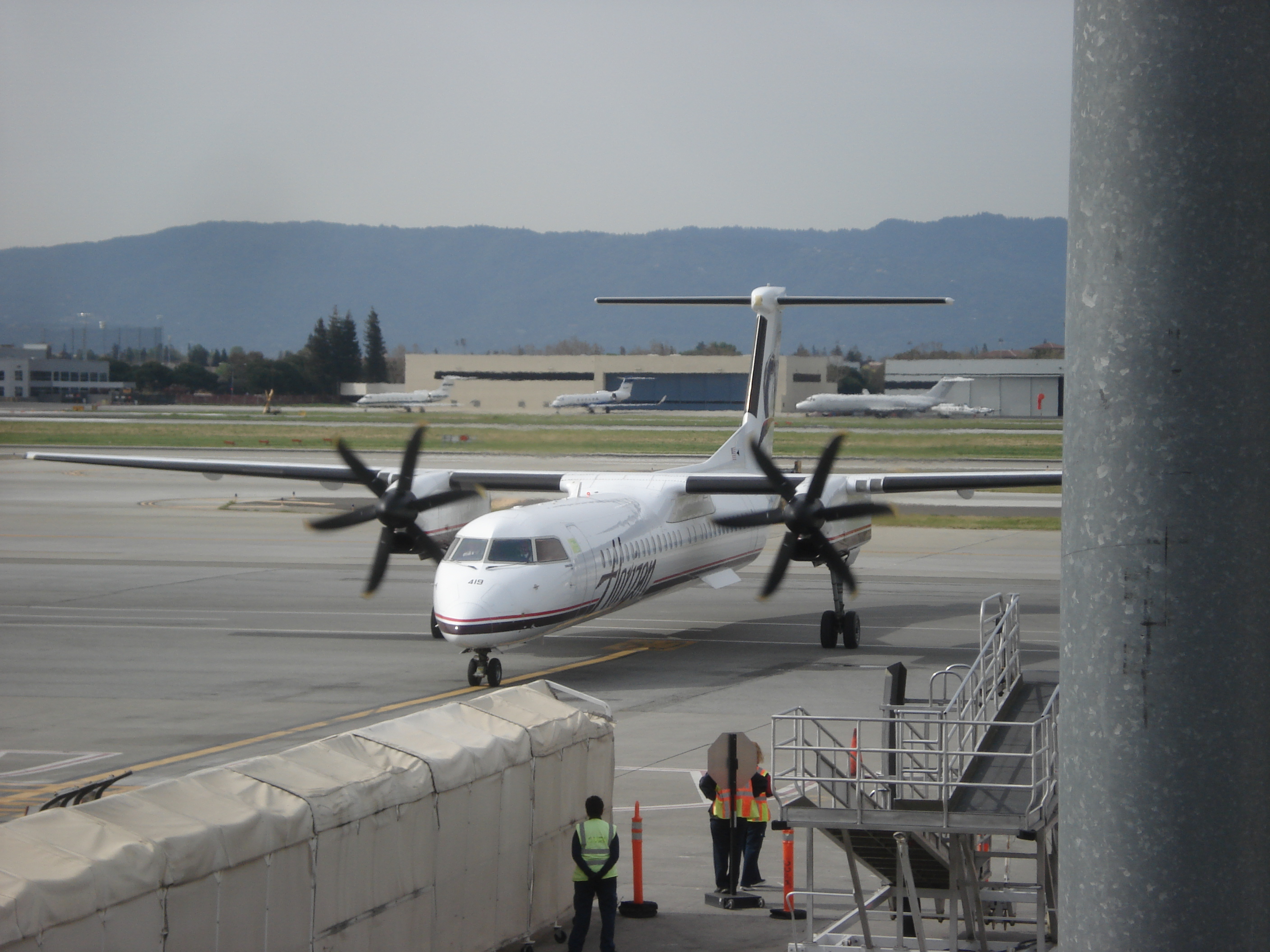
A Horizon Air Q400 arriving at Terminal C in March 2010

=== 2010–2019: rebound in service ===
Beginning in 2010, service expanded at SJC for the first time in several years. Domestic carriers JetBlue Airways and Alaska Airlines added or adjusted service while international carrier Volaris began service in May 2010 with flights to Guadalajara, Mexico. Alaska subsequently expanded offerings to include those in Hawaii and Mexico. The decade saw rapid expansion for the airport. In 2012, Hawaiian Airlines added service to Maui. All Nippon Airways announced it would begin service between San Jose and Tokyo in 2012, restoring the link between the two cities that was lost when American Airlines ended service on the route in 2006. The airline used the Boeing 787 Dreamliner, making San Jose one of the first cities in the United States to see scheduled 787 flights. Due to delivery delays of its 787 aircraft, the airline postponed the launch of the route to early 2013.

In 2015 and 2016, several new international flights were launched. Hainan Airlines began nonstop flights from Beijing. British Airways commenced daily Boeing 787 Dreamliner service from London–Heathrow; Air Canada returned, providing flights from Vancouver operated by Air Canada Express. Later in 2017 and 2018, Volaris expanded its offerings to Mexico with service to Morelia, Leon, and Zacatecas. Not all international routes proved successful. Lufthansa connected SJC and Frankfurt on flights operated by Lufthansa CityLine Airbus A340-300 aircraft, Aeromexico started a daily flight to Guadalajara, and later added seasonal service to Mexico City, and Air China introduced Shanghai–Pudong flights with an Airbus A330-200, but Lufthansa and Air China ended service in 2018 while Aeromexico ceased both flights in January 2019, later resuming Guadalajara for the 2019–2020 winter holiday season.

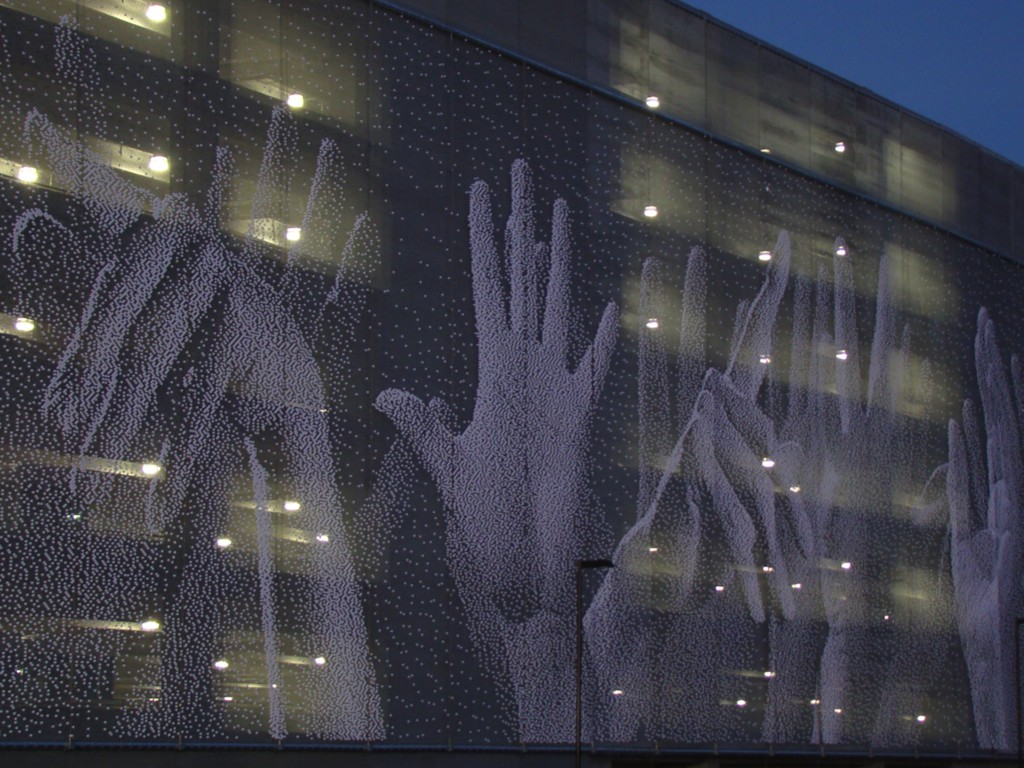
Hands, by artist Christian Moeller, covers the façade of garage 3.

In the wake of its acquisition of Virgin America, Alaska Airlines grew quickly at Mineta Airport as well as San Francisco International Airport between 2015 and 2018, adding intrastate cities like Orange County, Los Angeles, and San Diego, along with East Coast destinations Newark and New York–Kennedy. Alaska has designated SJC a focus city in several articles when announcing new destinations. Not all routes were successful, however, as service to Eugene, Burbank, and Dallas–Love ended in 2019, with Santa Ana, New York–Kennedy, and Tucson ending in 2020.

Other domestic carriers increased service or returned to the airport. Frontier Airlines resumed service to Denver and began flights to Las Vegas. Additional service to Austin, Atlanta, Cincinnati and San Antonio began in the spring of 2018 but did not return the next year. Delta Air Lines added service to its New York–Kennedy and Detroit hubs.

Southwest Airlines greatly expanded service from 2016 to 2020, connecting almost a dozen new cities across the country to SJC and added flights to Honolulu and Maui in May 2019.

=== 2020–present: COVID-19 pandemic and recovery ===
Beginning in March 2020, the impact of the COVID-19 pandemic on tourism severely curtailed the amount of passenger traffic and flights at the airport. From a high of 15.6 million passengers in 2019, only 4.7 million used the airport in 2020. Frontier Airlines and Hainan Airlines both ended service to SJC, while other airlines suspended or pared back many of their destinations, including all intercontinental service to Asia and Europe. Despite this large downturn in travel and drop in passenger demand, Alaska Airlines added flights to Palm Springs in 2021. Volaris also began a new route to Mexico City in November 2020. By June 2022, travel had recovered sufficiently that British Airways resumed its London–Heathrow service, and Japan Airlines–owned Zipair Tokyo announced new Tokyo–Narita service to begin that December. However, British Airways also announced that it would suspend flights to San Jose starting in October 2023; the airport ended the year with just over 12 million passengers, a number that failed to surpass 2017 levels. In 2024, JetBlue cancelled the airport's last remaining route to the New York City area and later announced it would be closing SJC as a station entirely.

== Facilities and aircraft ==
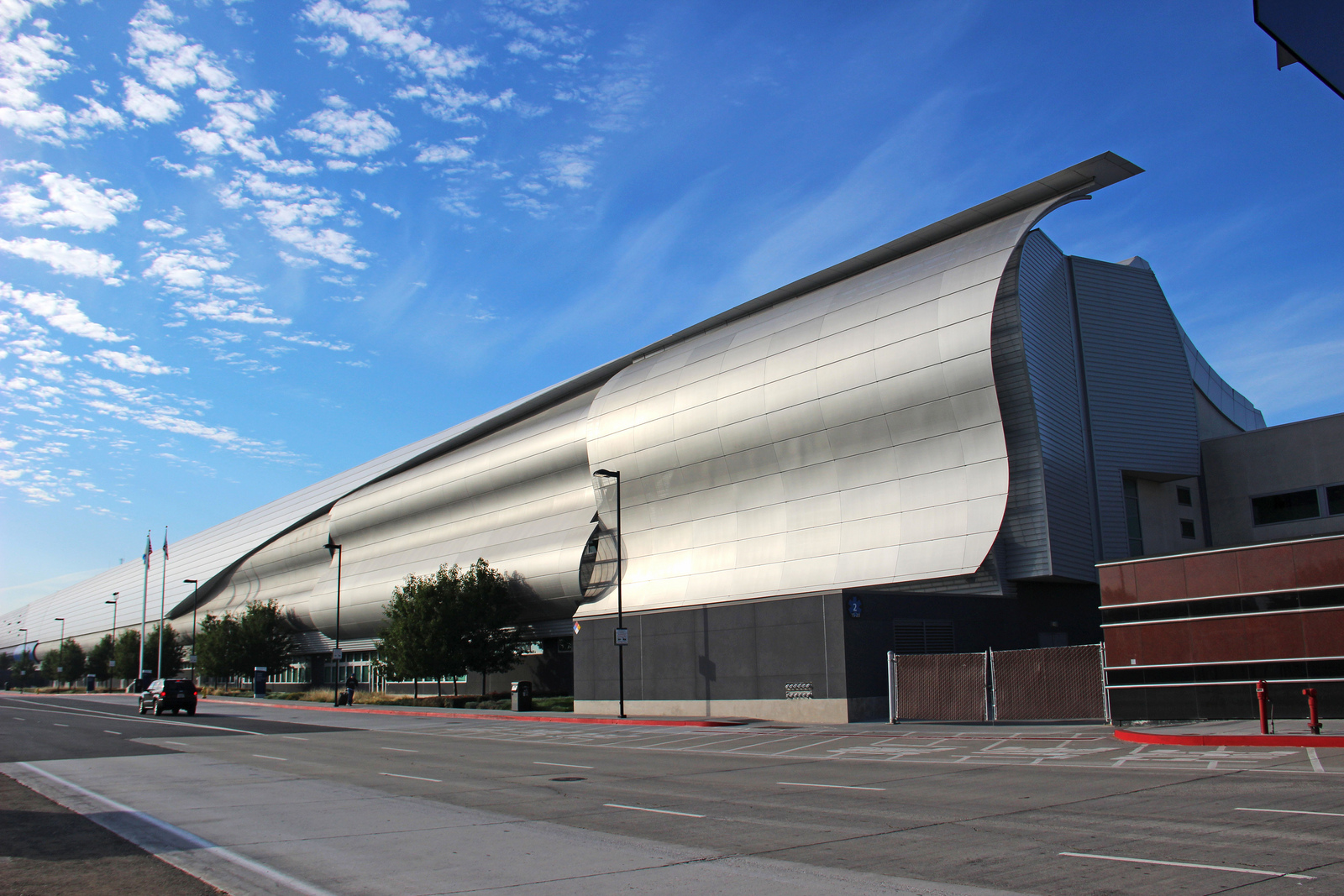
San Jose International Airport – Terminal B

Norman Y. Mineta San Jose International Airport covers 1,050 acres (420 ha) at an elevation of 62 feet (19 m). It has two active runways: 12L/30R and 12R/30L, each 11,000 by 150 feet (3,353 m × 46 m) asphalt/concrete. (Note: As of 2014, former runway 11/29 (4,599 by 100 feet (1,402 m × 30 m)) is closed indefinitely and is now a taxiway.)

From 1960 to 2010, San Jose State University operated a flight-simulator facility for its aviation program in buildings at the southeast corner of the airport. The university has since moved to the Reid–Hillview Airport about 5 miles southeast.

== Terminals ==
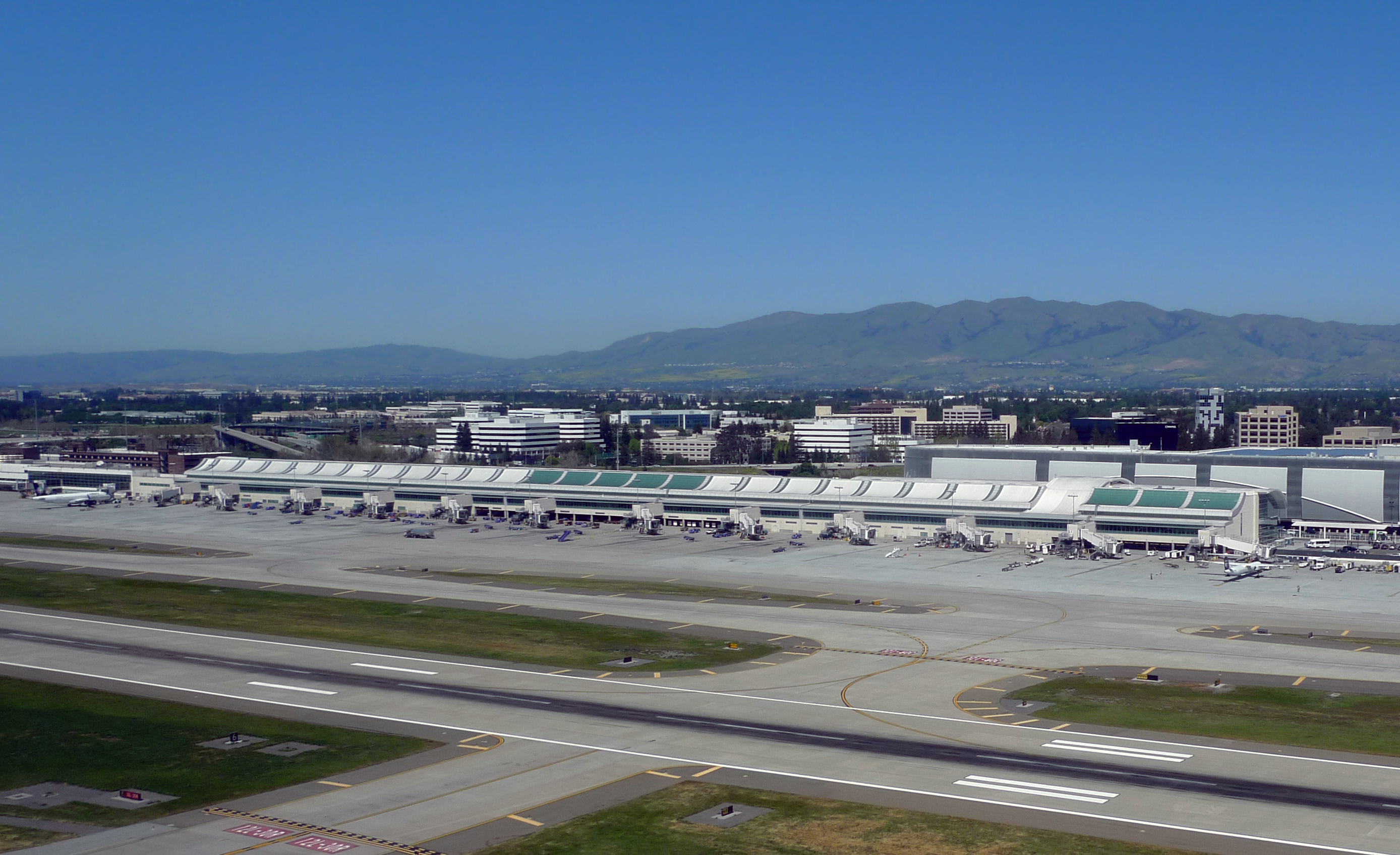
San Jose airport terminals

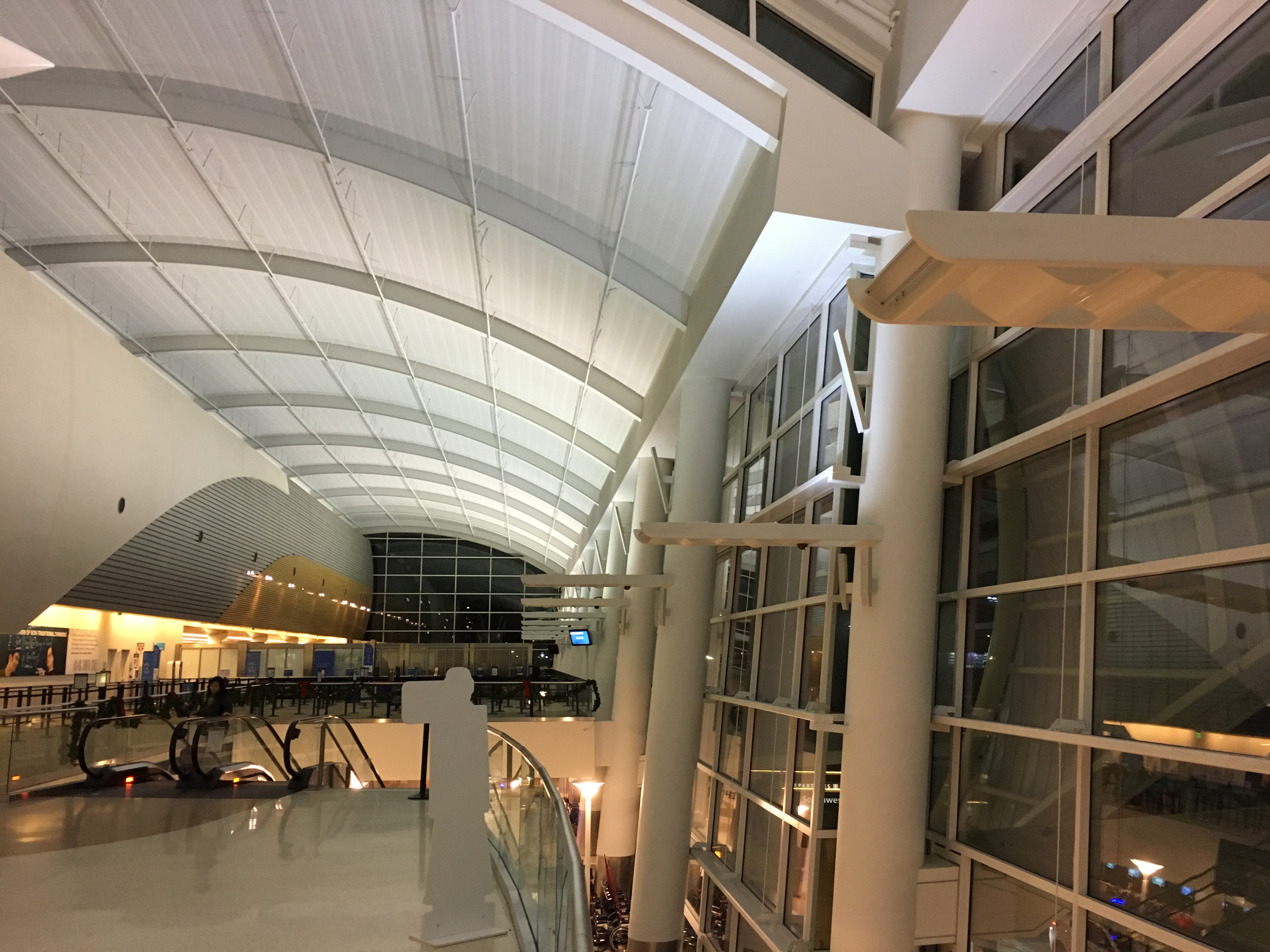
The security checkpoint in Terminal B. The escalators lead down to the check-in area.

There are two terminals at the airport, Terminal A, opened in 1990 and Terminal B opened in 2010. The terminals are connected airside. In 2009, the gates at the airport were renumbered in preparation for the addition of Terminal B. Gate A16B at the north end became Gate 1 and Gate A1A at the south end became Gate 16. The airport's first modern terminal building, Terminal C, was opened in 1965 and was closed and demolished in 2010. Its location is now a short term parking lot but will be used for the second phase of Terminal B when that facility is constructed.

=== Terminal A ===
Terminal A has 16 gates: 1–16, serving American, Delta, Frontier, United, and Volaris.

Designed by a team of architects and engineers led by HTB, Inc., Terminal A, and its adjoining parking garage was originally designed and built in 1990 for American Airlines. The overall program was led by a joint team of San Jose Airport and Public Works staff known as the "Airport Development Team". The project was awarded the Public Works Project of the Year by the California Council of Civil Engineers. It underwent extensive renovation and expansion in 2009, with larger ground-level ticketing counters, more curbside parking space, larger security checkpoints, and more concessions. The renovations and expansion were designed by Curtis W. Fentress, FAIA, RIBA of Fentress Architects.

The terminal includes an international arrivals building, which contains Gates 15 and 16. All arrivals from international flights at the airport must clear customs and immigration from this building (except for flights from airports with US border preclearance). Gates 17 and 18 in Terminal B were converted to handle international arrivals in early 2015.

The airport's single lounge was an Admirals Club across from Gate 8 for American Airlines passengers operated as part of its hub operation. Along with the drawdown of the airline's hub, it was closed in September 2010, with the airline citing rising costs and the cutbacks in its flight schedule. Terminal A now has two paid-entry lounges called "The Club at SJC" where passengers can wait for their flights and have access to snacks and beverages. Access to "The Club at SJC" is complimentary for passengers who have a Priority Pass card membership. One lounge is near the international gates and the other, opened at the end of 2019, has taken over and renovated part of the former Admirals Club.

=== Terminal B ===
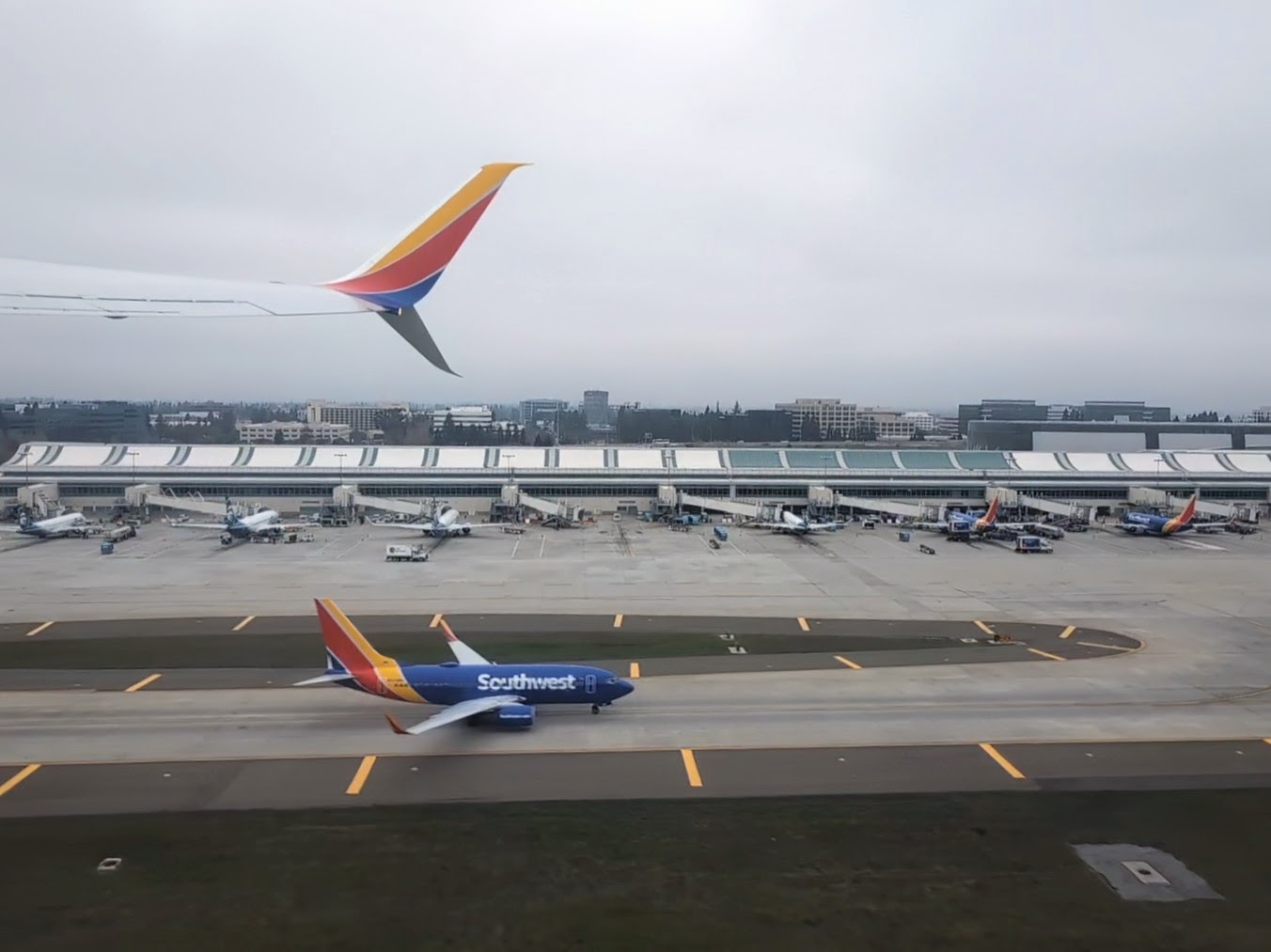
Terminal B viewed from a departing plane in January 2025

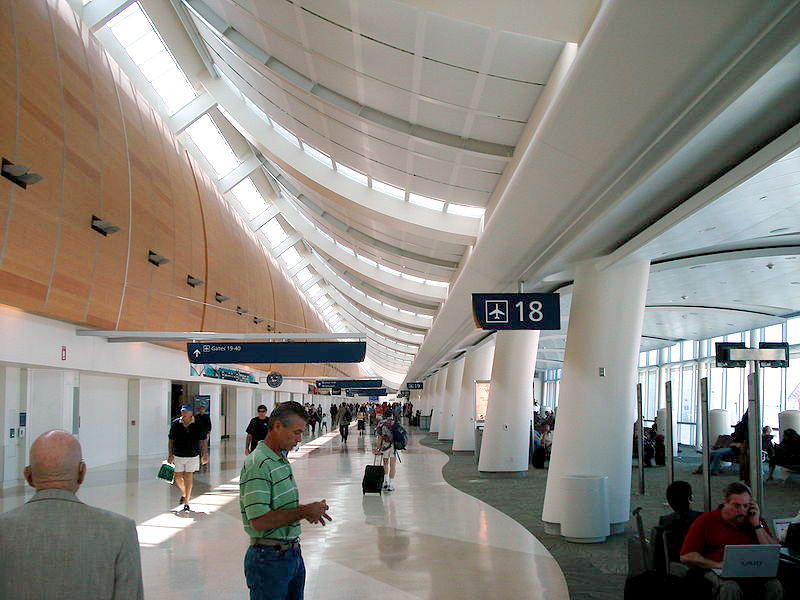
The departure hall of Terminal B, taken in 2011 (Note: Line 16 of Terminal B: In 2017, the airport added two gates, Gates 29 and 30, at the south end of the terminal. Due to the airport's growth in recent years, a new temporary facility was added at the south end of the terminal that includes six additional gates as part of the $58 million project. Gates 31-35 opened June 13, 2019, and Gate 36 opened on November 1, 2019.)

Terminal B has 20 gates: 17–36, serving Southwest, Alaska, Hawaiian, and Zipair Tokyo.

The concourse was designed by Gensler and built by Clark Construction, while the Terminal headhouse was designed by Fentress Architects with construction management by Hensel Phelps Construction Co. The terminal officially opened on June 30, 2010. Its design features dramatic daylit spaces, modern art, shared use ticket counters/gates, and chairs with power cords and USB ports on the armrests to charge laptops or handheld devices. The terminal earned a LEED Silver certification from the U.S. Green Building Council in 2010 in recognition of the airport's significant commitment to environmentally sustainable design and construction.

The terminal has two international arrival gates: Gates 17 and 18. All arrivals from international flights at the airport must clear customs and immigration from the International Arrivals building (except for flights from airports with US border preclearance). Gates 17–23 of the new concourse were opened to the public on July 15, 2009. During this time, check-in, security, and baggage claim were all in Terminal A. Gates 24–28 were opened on June 30, 2010, along with Terminal B's pre-security facilities.

In 2017, the airport added two gates, Gates 29 and 30, at the south end of the terminal. Due to the airport's growth in recent years, a new temporary facility was added at the south end of the terminal that includes six additional gates as part of the $58 million project. Gates 31-35 opened June 13, 2019, and Gate 36 opened on November 1, 2019.

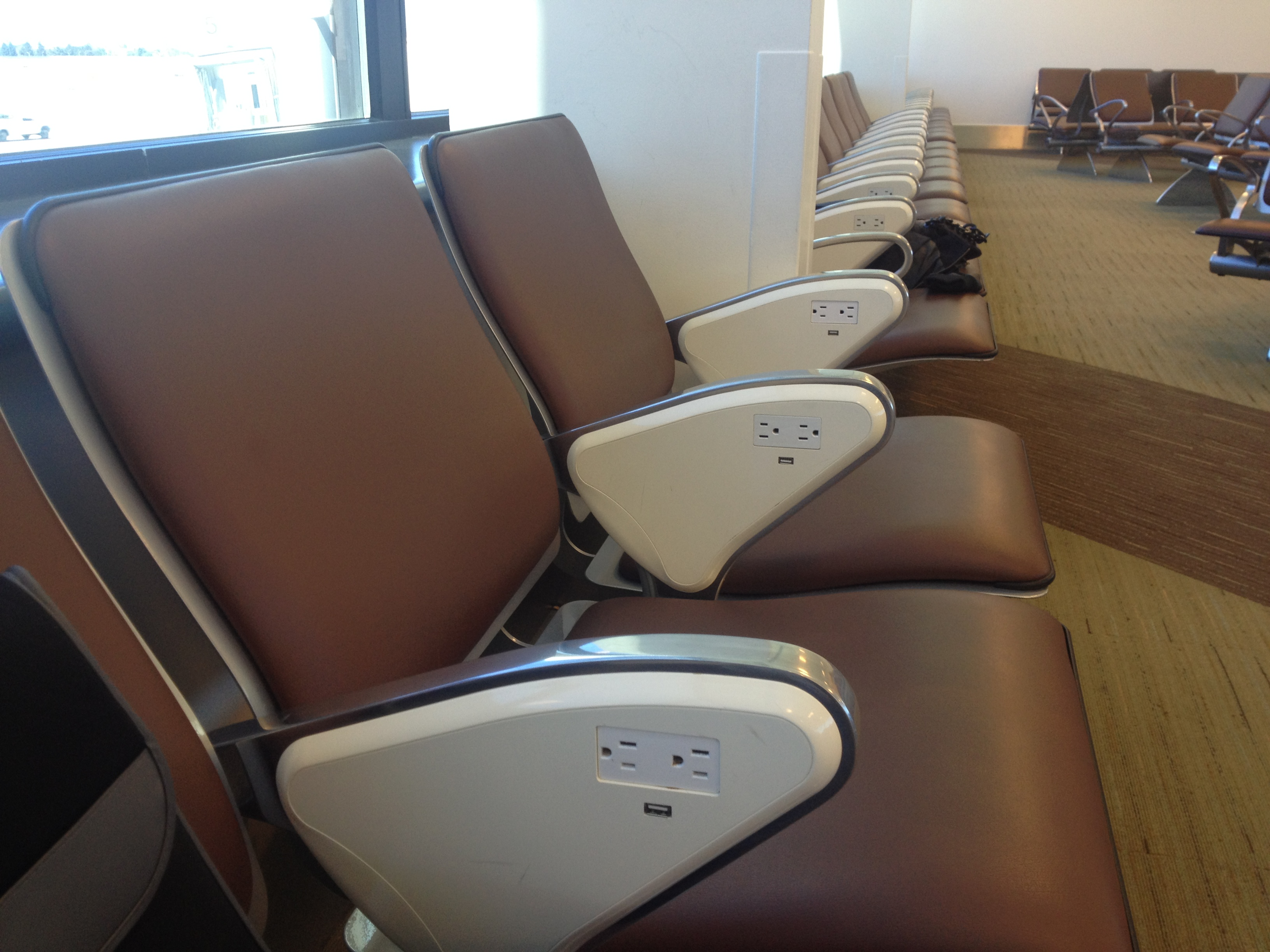
The seating area, with sockets and USB ports in each armrest

=== Former Terminal C ===
This terminal was built in 1965, before jet bridges (elevated corridors that connect planes to the terminal) became common at airports. Instead of using jet bridges, Terminal C mostly used airstairs. Some airlines, including Alaska Airlines and SkyWest Airlines, used turbo way ramps. In preparation for the construction of Terminal B, the north end of Terminal C was closed for demolition in December 2007. This part of the terminal was home to gates C14–C16, which housed Alaska Airlines, Horizon Air, and Frontier Airlines. The remaining portion of the terminal was reconfigured, including the addition of a new, larger, consolidated security checkpoint. The demolition of the north end occurred in February 2008, clearing the way for construction of Terminal B.

In December 2009, United Airlines, Continental Airlines and JetBlue moved to new or reconstructed gates in Terminal A, as the area within Terminal C containing the three airlines' gates was demolished. Other airlines operating at that time within Terminal C remained there until the North Concourse of Terminal B opened in June 2010. The Terminal C baggage claim was closed for demolition on February 2, 2010. This allowed for the completion of the airport's new roadways. The terminal was officially closed on June 30, 2010. The remaining portions of the terminal were torn down in July 2010 and space the terminal occupied now serves as a surface parking lot.

== Airlines and destinations ==
=== Passenger ===
Airlines	Destinations
Alaska Airlines	Boise, Everett (begins April 14, 2027), Los Angeles, Portland (OR), San Diego, Seattle/Tacoma; Seasonal: Guadalajara, Kailua-Kona, Lihue, Puerto Vallarta, San Jose del Cabo
American Airlines	Dallas/Fort Worth, Phoenix–Sky Harbor
American Eagle	Phoenix–Sky Harbor
Delta Air Lines	Atlanta, Austin, Los Angeles, Minneapolis/St. Paul, Salt Lake City
Delta Connection	Los Angeles, Salt Lake City, Seattle/Tacoma
Frontier Airlines	Las Vegas, Los Angeles
Hawaiian Airlines	Honolulu, Kahului
Southwest Airlines	Austin, Boise, Burbank, Chicago–Midway, Dallas–Love, Denver, Eugene, Honolulu, Houston–Hobby, Kahului, Las Vegas, Long Beach, Los Angeles, Nashville, Ontario, Orange County, Orlando, Palm Springs, Phoenix–Sky Harbor, Portland (OR), Reno/Tahoe, Salt Lake City, San Diego, Seattle/Tacoma, Spokane; Seasonal: Baltimore
United Airlines	Chicago–O'Hare, Denver
Volaris	Guadalajara, León/Del Bajío, Morelia, Zacatecas
Zipair Tokyo	Seasonal: Tokyo–Narita

=== Destinations map ===
Destinations map
Mainland U.S. Destinations from SJC
Red = Year-round destination
Green = Seasonal destination
Blue = Future destination
Hawaii destinations from SJC
Red = Year-round destination
Green = Seasonal destination
Blue = Future destination
Mexico destinations from SJC
Red = Year-round destination
Green = Seasonal destination
Blue = Future destination

== Statistics ==
=== Top destinations ===
Busiest domestic routes from SJC (September 2025 – August 2026)
Rank	City	Passengers	Carriers
1	San Diego, California	535,518	Alaska, Southwest, Spirit
2	Seattle–Tacoma International Airport	462,183	Alaska, Delta, Southwest
3	Las Vegas, Nevada	417,511	Southwest, Spirit
4	Los Angeles, California	376,662	Alaska, American, Delta, Southwest
5	Phoenix–Sky Harbor, Arizona	309,337	American, Southwest
6	Denver, Colorado	305,420	Southwest, United
7	Orange County, California	232,949	Southwest
8	Portland, Oregon	221,819	Alaska, Southwest
9	Burbank, California	178,688	Southwest
10	Dallas/Fort Worth, Texas	157,401	American

International routes from SJC, by ridership (September 2025 – August 2026)
Rank	City	Passengers	Carriers
1	Guadalajara, Mexico	234,351	Alaska, Volaris
2	Tokyo–Narita, Japan	64,297	ZIPAIR
3	Morelia, Mexico	54,620	Volaris
4	San José del Cabo, Mexico	37,086	Alaska
5	León/El Bajío, Mexico	24,551	Volaris
6	Zacatecas, Mexico	22,753	Volaris
7	Puerto Vallarta, Mexico	16,828	Alaska

=== Airline market share ===
Largest airlines at SJC (September 2025 – August 2026)
Rank	Airline	Passengers	Share
1	Southwest Airlines	5,699,260	58.3%
2	Alaska Airlines	1,415,448	14.5%
3	Delta Air Lines	1,126,337	11.5%
4	American Airlines	537,924	5.5%
5	United Airlines	389,920	4.0%
6	Other	600,900	6.2%

=== Annual traffic ===
Annual traffic at SJC 1998–present
Year	Passengers	Year	Passengers	Year	Passengers
1998	10,506,173	2008	9,720,150	2018	14,319,292
1999	11,452,334	2009	8,321,750	2019	15,650,444
2000	13,096,523	2010	8,246,342	2020	4,711,577
2001	13,074,467	2011	8,356,981	2021	7,357,441
2002	11,117,457	2012	8,296,392	2022	11,333,723
2003	10,601,190	2013	8,783,319	2023	12,097,160
2004	11,046,489	2014	9,385,212	2024	11,851,270
2005	10,891,466	2015	9,799,527	2025	10,675,167
2006	10,708,068	2016	10,796,725		
2007	10,658,191	2017	12,480,232		

== Accidents and incidents ==
- April 7, 1994 - FedEx Express Flight 705 was destined for San Jose when it experienced an attempted hijacking shortly after takeoff.

== General aviation ==
Private and corporate aircraft are based on the west side of the airfield off Coleman Avenue.

- Atlantic Aviation
- AvBase, Inc.
- Signature Flight Support
- Sky Harbour

The former General Aviation services were located on the south end of what is now runway 30R. Plane spotters and photographers now utilize the space where the San Jose State University Aviation Department was formerly located at the corner of Coleman Avenue and Airport Blvd.

== Ground transportation ==
The Santa Clara Valley Transportation Authority (VTA) bus route 60 serves the airport at Terminals A and B, which is free to ride from either terminal. Route 60 connects the airport to the Santa Clara Transit Center for Altamont Corridor Express, Caltrain, and Amtrak rail services, as well as numerous other VTA bus routes. Route 60 also connects to VTA light rail at Metro/Airport, Milpitas, and Winchester stations, in addition to Bay Area Rapid Transit (BART) at Milpitas station.

The airport is served by various taxi and vehicle for hire companies, and is accessible from highways Interstate 880, and US Route 101 via California State Route 87. There are five parking lots, including Economy Lot 1, Hourly Lots 2, 3, and 5 and Daily Lot 4. Rental car operations are located at the multi-story CONRAC garage across from Terminal B. A free cellphone waiting area exists across State Route 87 from the airport. Inter-terminal and Economy parking lot busing is provided by the airport at no charge.

== See also ==
- List of attractions in Silicon Valley
- List of airports in California
- List of Class C airports in the United States
- Reid–Hillview Airport, general aviation reliever airport also in San Jose, 4 miles ESE of SJC
