= Brave New World (disambiguation) =

Brave New World is a 1932 novel by Aldous Huxley.

Brave New World may also refer to:

== Film and television ==
=== Adaptations of the novel ===
- Brave New World (1980 film), American TV adaptation, starring Keir Dullea
- Brave New World (1998 film), American TV adaptation starring Peter Gallagher and Leonard Nimoy
- Brave New World (American TV series), 2020 American series streaming on Peacock

=== Documentaries ===
- Brave New World, a 1999 American miniseries presented by Robert Krulwich
- Brave New World, a 1994 British series by Open Media
- Brave New World with Stephen Hawking, a 2011 British series

=== Other film ===
- Captain America: Brave New World, a 2025 Marvel superhero film

=== Episodes ===
- "Brave New World" (Boy Meets World), the two-part series finale of Boy Meets World
- "Brave New World", the eighth episode of the fifth season of For All Mankind
- "Brave New World" (Fringe), the two-part finale of the fourth season of Fringe
- "Brave New World" (Grey's Anatomy), the fourth episode of the fifth season of Grey's Anatomy
- "Brave New World" (Heroes), the eighteenth and final episode of the fourth season of Heroes (which also introduces Volume 6, also titled "Brave New World")
- "Brave New World" (Heroes Reborn), the pilot episode of the miniseries Heroes Reborn, which was a spin-off from Heroes
- "Brave New World" (Masters of Sex), 2013
- "Brave New World" (One Tree Hill), the tenth episode of the third season of One Tree Hill
- "Brave New World" (seaQuest 2032), the first episode of the third season of seaQuest DSV
- "Brave New World" (The Vampire Diaries), the second episode of the second season of The Vampire Diaries

== Games ==
- Brave New World (role-playing game), a 1999 tabletop game
- Civilization V: Brave New World, a 2013 strategy computer game expansion
- Project X Zone 2: Brave New World, a 2015 tactical RPG
- Final Fantasy VI: Brave New World, a ROM hack of Final Fantasy VI

== Literature ==
- "brave new world", a phrase from Shakespeare's play The Tempest
- DCU: Brave New World, a 2006 comic book released at One Year Later

== Music ==
=== Albums ===
- Brave New World (Iron Maiden album), or the title song
- Brave New World (The Rippingtons album), or the title song
- Brave New World (Steve Miller Band album), or the title song
- Brave New World (Styx album), or the title song
- Brave New World (Amanda Cook album), or the title song

=== Songs ===
- "Brave New World" (song), by Toyah from The Changeling
- "Brave New World", a song by Technology from Nositel Idey
- "The Opera Song (Brave New World)", by Jurgen Vries and Charlotte Church
- "Brave New World", by Covenant from Skyshaper
- "Brave New World", by Weezer from Hurley
- "Brave New World", by Geri Halliwell, a B-side to the single "It's Raining Men"
- "Brave New World", by Hedley from Famous Last Words
- "Brave New World", by Iron Savior from Iron Savior
- "Brave New World", by Glenn Frey from Strange Weather
- "Brave New World", by Jeff Wayne from Jeff Wayne's Musical Version of The War of the Worlds
- "Brave New World", by Motörhead from Hammered
- "Brave New World", by Reagan Youth from Volume 2
- "Brave New World", by Richard Ashcroft from Alone with Everybody
- "Brave New World", the main theme from the video game Namco × Capcom
- "Brave New World", by Jan Hammer from Beyond the Mind's Eye
- "Brave New World", by Thomas Newman from Skyfall
- "Brave New World", by Watsky and Kush Mody from x Infinity
- "Brave New World", a song by Greta Van Fleet from Anthem of the Peaceful Army
- "Brave New World", a song by New Model Army from The Ghost of Cain
- "Brave New World", a song by Iron Maiden from Brave New World (Iron Maiden album)
- ”Brave New World”, a song by Starset from Silos (Starset album)

=== Other uses in music ===
- Brave New World, a television news music package composed by Shelly Palmer
- Brave New World, a band founded by Adam Holzman
