= Biwa Hayahide =

Japanese-bred Thoroughbred racehorse

Biwa Hayahide ビワハヤヒデ
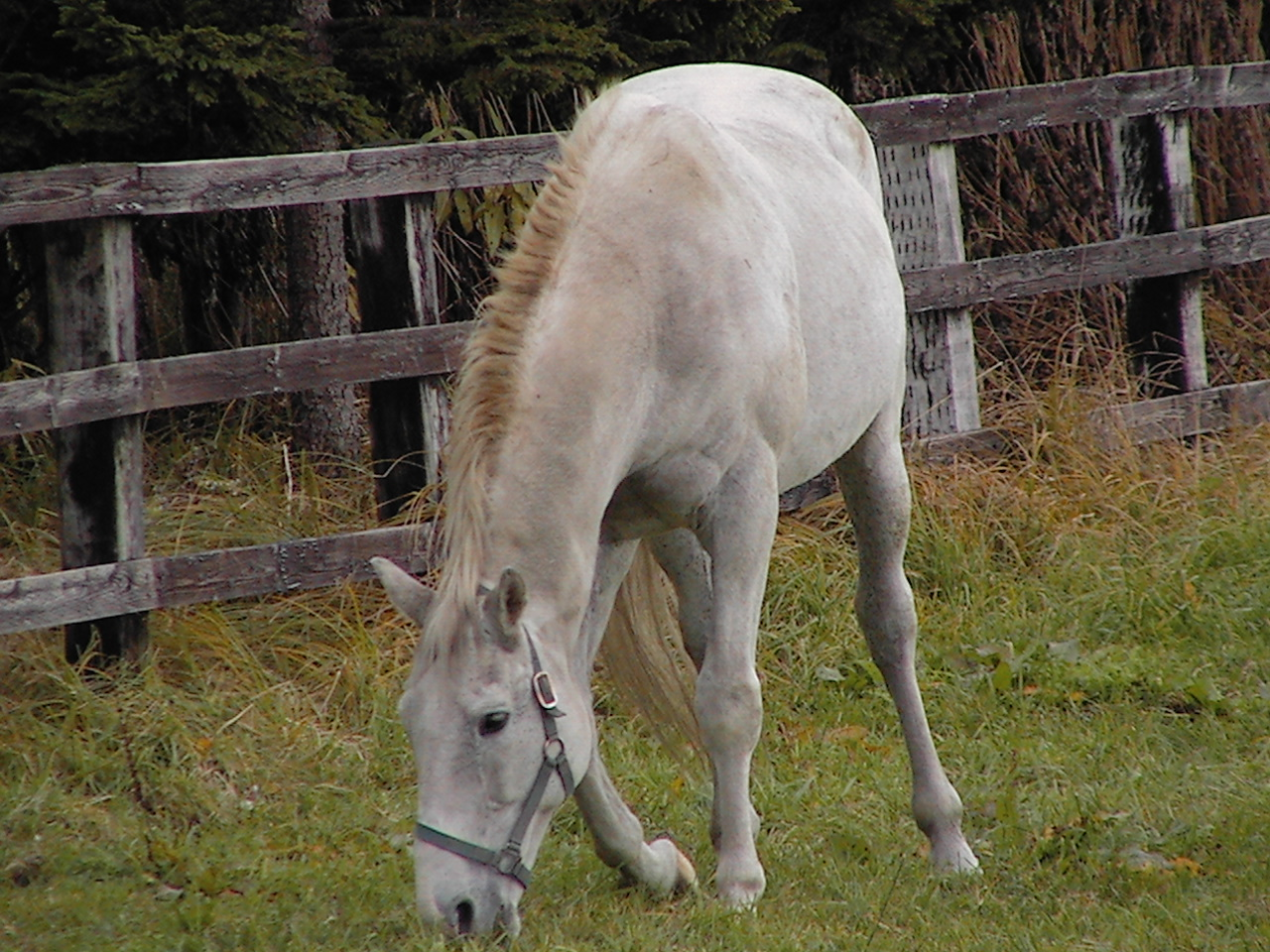
- Biwa Hayahide in 2008.
- Breed: Thoroughbred
- Sire: Sharrood
- Grandsire: Caro
- Dam: Pacificus
- Damsire: Northern Dancer
- Sex: Stallion
- Foaled: March 10, 1990
- Died: July 21, 2020 (aged 30)
- Country: Japan
- Colour: Gray
- Breeder: Hayata Farm
- Owner: Biwa Co., Ltd.
- Racing colours
- Trainer: Mitsumasa Hamada
- Jockey: Shigehiko Kishi; Yukio Okabe
- Record: 16: 10-5-0
- Earnings: ¥897,675,000

Major wins
- Daily Hai Sansai Stakes (1992); Kobe Shimbun Hai (1993); Kyōto Kinen (1994); Tenno Sho (Spring) (1994); Takarazuka Kinen (1994); Sankei Sho All Comers (1994); Japanese Classic Race wins: Kikuka-shō (1993)

Awards
- Japanese Champion 3-Year-Old Colt (1993); Japanese Horse of the Year (1993); Japanese Champion 4-Year-Old Colt (1994)

Biwa Hayahide (Japanese: ビワハヤヒデ; Hepburn: Biwa Hayahide; 10 March 1990 – 21 July 2020) was a Japanese thoroughbred racehorse. Biwa Hayahide was highly successful, winning 10 of his 16 races, including Grade I victories in the Kikuka-shō, spring Tenno Sho, and Takarazuka Kinen. Biwa Hayahide was part of the "BNW" trio together with Narita Taishin and Winning Ticket who were rivals during the 1993 Japanese Triple Crown. He was voted Japanese Horse of the Year in 1993, as well as being named Best Three-Year-Old Colt the same year and Best Older Male Horse in 1994. His streak of finishing in the top two in his first 15 races is the second-longest in the history of Japanese thoroughbred racing, just behind Shinzan. Biwa Hayahide was the half-brother of Narita Brian.

== Background ==
Biwa Hayahide was on foaled 10 March 1990 at Hayata Farm in Fukushima Prefecture. His sire was Sharrood, an American horse who had been brought to the US for breeding, and his dam was Pacificus.

When trainer Mitsumasa Hamada saw Biwa Hayahide for the first time, he remarked that 'He still seemed physically underdeveloped. His head was large for his body, and his legs were thick. He seemed out of proportion. But his pedigree was good. It's rare to have Northern Dancer in the lineage. So I didn't worry too much about Biwa Hayahide's conformation'.

As a one-year-old, Biwa Hayahide suffered an injury after colliding with a fence on the farm. The collision left him with an approximately 10 cm (3.9 in) gouge near the metatarsal bone on his right forelimb. His trainer, Mitsumasa Hamada, stated the wound was roughly the size of a 10 yen coin. The horse narrowly avoided severe injury - had the cut been 1 cm (0.39 in) deeper, it would have struck his tendon, which would likely have been fatal. Biwa Hayahide recovered from the injuries and, as a two-year-old, was sent to Hamada Stables to train for racing. He was named "Biwa Hayahide" with the wish to "excel in speed".

== Appearance ==
In terms Biwa Hayahide's physical characteristics, his large face was often mentioned, either as a charm point or as a target for teasing. Announcer Kiyoshi Sugimoto recalled the Kobe Shimbun Hai where Biwa Hayahide removed his hood for the first time: "I was surprised by this. What surprised me the most was his huge face." He described the horse's face as handsome but large and long, and revealed that at the time he and his friends used to say, "If it comes down to a photo finish, we might benefit from it."

Writer Tamaki Abe said, "Seeing Biwa Hayahide with jockey Okabe on him, the horse's face was far larger and longer than the jockey's body, and I couldn’t help but laugh," and regarding Biwa Hayahide's large female fan base, (Note: Hamada reportedly said that “80% of the fans were women,” and that he received five cardboard boxes full of fan letters.) added, "It was probably also because of the calm atmosphere his face conveyed." On the other hand, Yuki Takayama reflected on Biwa Hayahide as a foal, saying, "He had big black eyes and really looked intelligent," and later noted, "After he became popular on the turf, people talked about how his face was big, but that's not true. Because he’s white, he looks bigger. That’s all there is to it."

Horse trainer Mitsumada Hamada once expressed his beliefs that "horses with large heads are no good as racehorses," reasoning that "if a horse has a large head, its head drops forward, causing insufficient movement of the front legs, leading to a cramped posture and a disrupted balance of form." He later reconsidered this view, stating that Biwa Hayahide's body type was actually well-suited for modern speed racing, and that "the shoulders, hips, and overall balance are all structured in a way that does not put strain on the legs, which is what gives this horse its physique. Therefore, no matter how intense the race or how fast the time, the horse does not suffer from leg problems."

Keijiro Okawa, when discussing Biwa Hayahide, referenced Hamada's theory and commented on the horse's impressive racing ability despite it, saying, "I think the engine built into him is different from other horses, top-notch even. That’s why he achieved such remarkable results." Horse racing commentator and critic Tomoyasu Ito shared his private view on Biwa Hayahide's physique, noting that in the autumn of his three-year-old season, including the size of his head and neck, the horse seemed "stout," but by the autumn of his four-year-old season, "his body had lengthened and become more flexible to the point where I found myself thinking, 'he shouldn’t have been like this…'", displaying a belief that Biwa Hayahide's ability had developed in such a way that his proportions were no longer a cause for concern.

== Racing career ==
=== 1992: two-year-old season ===
Biwa Hayahide was originally to make his racing debut in August 1992 at Kokura Racecourse, but he was forced to miss this race due to illness. He instead started his first race in September at Hanshin Racecourse, where he won by a large margin. He then won his next two races, including his first graded-stakes victory with the Grade II Daily Hai Sansai Stakes in November. In December, he was entered in to the Grade I Asahi Hai Futurity Stakes. Biwa Hayahide was the favorite to win, but finished second to L-Way Win, marking his first loss.

=== 1993: three-year-old season ===
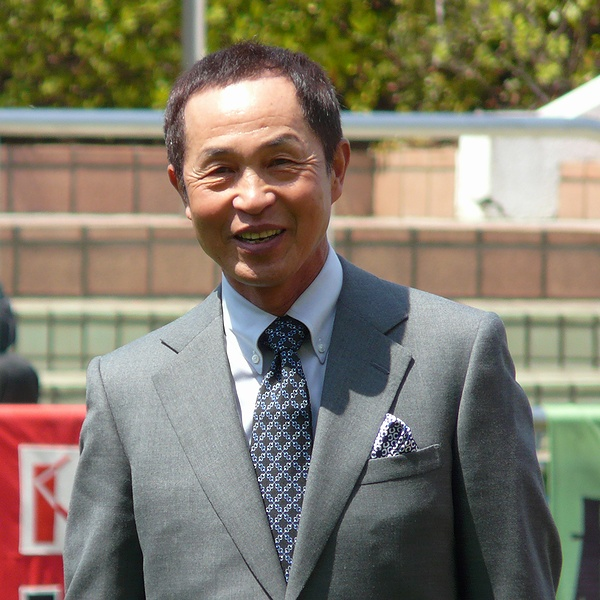
Yukio Okabe was Biwa Hayahide's jockey for his three and four-year-old seasons.

Biwa Hayahide's 1993 season began with the Kyodo Tsushin Hai as he was prepared to enter the Japanese Triple Crown. Biwa Hayahide was the favorite, but finished second in this race. Dissatisfied with this result, the horse's owner decided to replace jockey Shigehiko Kishi after the race. Some consideration was given to hiring Yutaka Take, but Biwa Hayahide's owner felt Take was not experienced enough yet. He instead decided to hire Yukio Okabe, who had previously ridden successful horses such as Symboli Rudolf, Oguri Cap, and Tokai Teio. Okabe and Biwa Hayahide then raced the Wakaba Stakes in March, where the horse won by a large margin.

Biwa Hayahide's next races were the Japanese Triple Crown races. At the Satsuki Shō, Biwa Hayahide entered as the second favorite, behind Winning Ticket. However, both were passed Narita Taishin, who defeated Biwa Hayahide by a neck, while Winning Ticket fell to fourth. At the next race, the Tōkyō Yūshun, Winning Ticket, Biwa Hayahide, and Narita Taishin were again the first, second, and third favorites respectively. Biwa Hayahide finished second again, this time finishing 1/2 length behind Winning Ticket. During the break after the Tōkyō Yūshun, training continued in preparation for the final race of the triple crown, the Kikuka-shō. Biwa Hayahide won the Kobe Shimbun Hai in September as part of preparations. At the Kikuka-shō, Biwa Hayahide entered as the favorite, in part due to the extra preparation. Biwa Hayahide took victory by five lengths, while his rivals Winning Ticket and Narita Taishin finished third and 17th. With a winning time of 3:04.7, Biwa Hayahide broke the record for fastest Kikuka-shō that had been set the previous year by Rice Shower.

At the end of the year, Biwa Hayahide was voted in to the Arima Kinen as the favorite. Biwa Hayahide led in to the final straight, but was passed and defeated by Tokai Teio, who was in his first race since the previous years' Arima Kinen. In January of the next year during the JRA Awards, Biwa Hayahide was voted as both Japanese Horse of the Year and Best Three-year-old colt for 1993.

=== 1994: four-year-old season ===
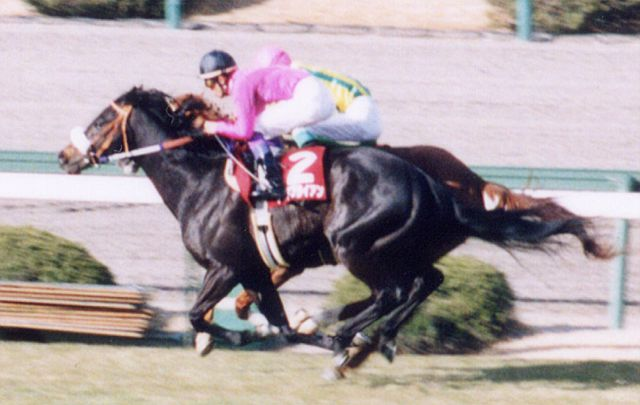
Biwa Hayahide's half-brother Narita Brian rose to fame at the same time as Biwa Hayahide's four-year-old season

Biwa Hayahide began his four-year-old season with a win in the Kyoto Kinen, where he took victory again by a large margin. Biwa Hayahide's next race was the spring Tenno Sho. He entered the race as the favorite, with most of his rivals from his three-year-old season skipping this race, save for Narita Taishin. In the race, despite struggling in the early going, Biwa Hayahide broke free from the field and won by one length. During this time, media attention increased on Biwa Hayahide due to his successes and the simultaneous rise of his half-brother Narita Brian (who would win that year's Triple Crown), with the two's strength frequently highlighted.

Biwa Hayahide's next race was the Takarazuka Kinen, another Grade I event. Narita Taishin was not entered in to this race, and so the only horse besides Biwa Hayahide in the race with a previous GI win was Vega. Biwa Hayahide took victory again for his third career grade I victory, in the process setting a new record for fastest Takarazuka Kinen at 2:11.2.

During the summer break, Biwa Hayahide's owner announced his intentions to enter the fall Tenno Sho and end the year with Arima Kinen, but notably would skip the Japan Cup. His owner claimed that this path would set up a likely showdown between Biwa Hayahide and Narita Brian at the Arima Kinen. Some, however, criticized the move to skip the Japan Cup, claiming that it was avoiding racing the strongest opponents.

In September, Biwa Hayahide was entered in to the Sankei Sho All Comers in preparation for the Tenno Sho. For the first time since the 1993 Arima Kinen, Biwa Hayahide raced against Winning Ticket. Biwa Hayahide won again, with Winning Ticket in second. At the Tenno Sho, Biwa Hayahide entered as the favorite. He led much of the race, but in the final straight fell back significantly and finished only fifth, the only time Biwa Hayahide finished outside the top two. Jockey Yukio Okabe felt something was wrong and had Biwa Hayahide transported from the course via horse ambulance. After being checked by veterinarians, it was discovered that Biwa Hayahide had developed tendinitis in his left-front leg. While the injury was not life-threatening, it would take roughly a year to recover, ending any chance of the horse racing against Narita Brian. Three days after the Tenno Sho, his owners announced that Biwa Hayahide would be retired from racing.

At the end of the year, Biwa Hayahide was voted as the best older male horse at the JRA awards.

== Retirement ==
Biwa Hayahide was retired to stud at Nissai Farm. He was mostly unsuccessful as a sire, producing no graded stakes winners. Eventually, Narita Brian would surpass Biwa Hayahide as a sire. Biwa Hayahide's most successful offspring was San M.X., who earned ¥132.11 million after placing in multiple grade II races. Biwa Hayahide was retired as a stallion in 2005.

In September 2019, an employee of Nissai Farm found that someone had broken in to the farm and cut a piece of Biwa Hayahide's mane, approximately 10 centimeters long and 10 centimeters wide. Similar incidents were reported at other farms in the coming weeks. At Versailles Farm, both Taiki Shuttle and Rose Kingdom had their manes cut, and in Urakawa Town, Winning Ticket also had his mane cut.

Biwa Hayahide became weak from age in 2020. His owners hoped that the milder summer experienced that year would help the horse, but Biwa Hayahide died from old age on 21 July 2020 at age 30.

== In popular culture ==
An anthropomorphized version of Biwa Hayahide appears as a character in the Japanese multimedia franchise Umamusume: Pretty Derby, voiced by Yui Kondo. She is depicted as a calculating, logic-driven girl who seeks to develop the “perfect winning equation” for every race. Similar to her real-life counterpart, she is the older sister of Narita Brian, while her 1993 Triple Crown rivals of Narita Taishin and Winning Ticket are her best friends and teammates in the anime series, making up the "BNW" trio. Biwa Hayahide is also self-conscious of her head size, alluding to her real-life horse's large face, which often gets to the point where she becomes defensive at any remark with the word "big" and/or "head." Like her real-life counterpart, she loves bananas and regularly gorges on them.

== Racing record ==
Biwa Hayahide ran in 16 races, with 10 wins including 3 Grade 1 victories.

| Date | Age | Race | Grade | Distance (condition) | Track | Finish | Time | Winning (Losing) Margin | Field | Jockey | 1st Place (2nd Place) |
|---|---|---|---|---|---|---|---|---|---|---|---|
| Sep 13, 1992 | 2 | Two Year Old | | Turf 1600m (Firm) | Hanshin | 1st | 1:38.3 | 10 lengths | 14 | Shigehiko Kishi | (T. M. Shinzan) |
| Oct 10, 1992 | 2 | Momiji Stakes | OP | Turf 1600m (Firm) | Kyoto | 1st | 1:34.3 | 1 1/4 lengths | 10 | Shigehiko Kishi | (Silk Moonlight) |
| Nov 7, 1992 | 2 | Daily Hai Nisai Stakes | G2 | Turf 1400m (Firm) | Kyoto | 1st | 1:21.7 | 1 3/4 lengths | 9 | Shigehiko Kishi | (T. M. Hurricane) |
| Dec 13, 1992 | 2 | Asahi Hai Futurity Stakes | G1 | Turf 1600m (Firm) | Nakayama | 2nd | 1:35.5 | (nose) | 12 | Shigehiko Kishi | L-Way Win |
| Feb 14, 1993 | 3 | Kyodo Tsushin Hai | G3 | Turf 1800m (Firm) | Tokyo | 2nd | 1:48.7 | (head) | 9 | Shigehiko Kishi | Meiner Remark |
| Mar 20, 1993 | 3 | Wakaba Stakes | OP | Turf 2000m (Firm) | Nakayama | 1st | 2:00.9 | 2 lengths | 8 | Yukio Okabe | (Ken Tony O) |
| Apr 18, 1993 | 3 | Satsuki Shō | G1 | Turf 2000m (Firm) | Nakayama | 2nd | 2:00.3 | (neck) | 18 | Yukio Okabe | Narita Taishin |
| May 30, 1993 | 3 | Tōkyō Yūshun | G1 | Turf 2400m (Firm) | Tokyo | 2nd | 2:25.6 | (1/2 length) | 18 | Yukio Okabe | Winning Ticket |
| Sep 26, 1993 | 3 | Kobe Shimbun Hai | G2 | Turf 2000m (Firm) | Hanshin | 1st | 2:02.9 | 1 1/2 lengths | 9 | Yukio Okabe | (Nehai Caesar) |
| Nov 7, 1993 | 3 | Kikuka-shō | G1 | Turf 3000m (Firm) | Kyoto | 1st | R3:04.7 | 5 lengths | 18 | Yukio Okabe | (Stage Champ) |
| Dec 26, 1993 | 3 | Arima Kinen | G1 | Turf 2500m (Firm) | Nakayama | 2nd | 2:31.0 | (1/2 length) | 14 | Yukio Okabe | Tokai Teio |
| Feb 13, 1994 | 4 | Kyōto Kinen | G2 | Turf 2200m (Good) | Hanshin | 1st | 2:16.8 | 7 lengths | 10 | Yukio Okabe | (Roubles Act) |
| Apr 24, 1994 | 4 | Tenno Sho (Spring) | G1 | Turf 3200m (Good) | Hanshin | 1st | 3:22.6 | 1 1/4 lengths | 11 | Yukio Okabe | (Narita Taishin) |
| Jun 12, 1994 | 4 | Takarazuka Kinen | G1 | Turf 2200m (Firm) | Hanshin | 1st | 2:11.2 | 5 lengths | 14 | Yukio Okabe | (Ayrton Symboli) |
| Sep 18, 1994 | 4 | Sankei Sho All Comers | G3 | Turf 2200m (Soft) | Nakayama | 1st | 2:14.5 | 1 3/4 lengths | 8 | Yukio Okabe | (Winning Ticket) |
| Oct 30, 1994 | 4 | Tenno Sho (Autumn) | G1 | Turf 2000m (Firm) | Tokyo | 5th | 1:59.1 | (2 1/4 lengths) | 13 | Yukio Okabe | Nehai Caesar |

Legend:
*R indicated that it was a record finish time.

== Pedigree ==
Pedigree of Biwa Hayahide (JPN), gray, 1990
| Sire Sharrood (USA) 1985 | Caro (IRE); 1967 | Fortino (FR); 1959 | Grey Sovereign (GBR); 1948 |
| Sire Sharrood (USA) 1985 | Caro (IRE); 1967 | Fortino (FR); 1959 | Ranavalo (FR); 1954 |
| Sire Sharrood (USA) 1985 | Caro (IRE); 1967 | Chambord (GBR); 1955 | Chamossaire (IRE); 1942 |
| Sire Sharrood (USA) 1985 | Caro (IRE); 1967 | Chambord (GBR); 1955 | Life Hill (GB); 1940 |
| Sire Sharrood (USA) 1985 | Angel Island (USA); 1976 | Cougar (CHL); 1966 | Tale of Two Cities; 1951 |
| Sire Sharrood (USA) 1985 | Angel Island (USA); 1976 | Cougar (CHL); 1966 | Cindy Lou; 1955 |
| Sire Sharrood (USA) 1985 | Angel Island (USA); 1976 | Who's to Know (USA); 1970 | Fleet Nasrullah; 1955 |
| Sire Sharrood (USA) 1985 | Angel Island (USA); 1976 | Who's to Know (USA); 1970 | Masked Lady; 1964 |
| Dam Pacificus (USA) 1981 | Northern Dancer (CAN); 1961 | Nearctic (CAN); 1954 | Nearco (ITY); 1935 |
| Dam Pacificus (USA) 1981 | Northern Dancer (CAN); 1961 | Nearctic (CAN); 1954 | Lady Angela (GBR); 1944 |
| Dam Pacificus (USA) 1981 | Northern Dancer (CAN); 1961 | Natalma (USA); 1957 | Native Dancer (CAN); 1950 |
| Dam Pacificus (USA) 1981 | Northern Dancer (CAN); 1961 | Natalma (USA); 1957 | Almahmoud (USA); 1947 |
| Dam Pacificus (USA) 1981 | Pacific Princess (USA); 1973 | Damascus (USA); 1964 | Sword Dancer (USA); 1956 |
| Dam Pacificus (USA) 1981 | Pacific Princess (USA); 1973 | Damascus (USA); 1964 | Kerala; 1958 |
| Dam Pacificus (USA) 1981 | Pacific Princess (USA); 1973 | Fiji (GBR); 1960 | Acropolis (GBR); 1952 |
| Dam Pacificus (USA) 1981 | Pacific Princess (USA); 1973 | Fiji (GBR); 1960 | Rififi (Family:13-a); 1954 |

== See also ==
- Narita Taishin and Winning Ticket - Biwa Hayahide's rivals during the 1993 Japanese Triple Crown; the trio became known as "BNW", a combination of their initials.
