= Narita (surname) =

Narita (written: 成田) is a Japanese surname. Notable people with the surname include:

- Aki Narita (成田 亜希; born 1976), Japanese speed skater
- Akihiko Narita (成田 暁彦; born 1990), Japanese video game composer
- Akira Narita (成田 アキラ; born 1945), Japanese manga artist
- Dome Narita (成田 童夢; born 1985), Japanese former snowboarder and subculture tarento
- Elizabeth Sakura Narita (成田・エリザベス・サクラ; born 1974), Japanese singer, songwriter, producer
- Gurimu Narita (成田 緑夢; born 1994), Japanese Paralympic snowboarder
- Hiro Narita (ヒロ・ナリタ; born 1941), Japanese-American cinematographer
- Hitoshi Narita (成田 均), Japanese naval architect, researcher, business executive
- Ikumi Narita (成田 郁久美; born 1976), Japanese former volleyball player
- Narita Kaihime (成田 甲斐姫; 1572–?), Japanese warrior
- Kakeru Narita (成田 翔; born 1998), Japanese baseball player
- Kazuya Narita (成田 和也; born 1979), Japanese track cyclist
- Ken Narita (singer) (成田 剣; 1945–2018), Japanese singer and musician
- Ken Narita (成田 剣; born 1964), Japanese actor, voice actor, narrator
- Kohei Narita (成田 幸平; born 1989), Japanese handball player
- Masahiro Narita (成田 正弘; born 1994), Japanese former professional basketball player
- Mayumi Narita (成田 真由美; 1970–2025), Japanese Paralympic swimmer
- Mero Narita (成田 夢露; born 1987), Japanese television personality and half-pipe snowboarder
- Mikio Narita (成田 三樹夫; 1935–1990), Japanese actor
- Mio Narita (成田 実生; born 2006), Japanese swimmer
- Misuzu Narita (成田 美寿々; born 1992), Japanese professional golfer
- Ren Narita (成田 蓮; born 1997), Japanese professional wrestler
- Ryo Narita (成田 凌; born 1993), Japanese actor and model
- Ryōgo Narita (成田 良悟; born 1980), Japanese light novelist and manga writer
- Seiji Narita (成田 静司), Japanese former table tennis player
- Takashi Narita (成田 貴志; born 1969), Japanese former volleyball player
- Tamezō Narita (成田 為三; 1893–1945), Japanese composer
- Tohl Narita (成田 亨; 1929–2002), Japanese visual artist
- Tomomi Narita (成田 知巳; 1912–1979), Japanese politician
- Yoshimi Narita (成田 良美; born 1973), Japanese anime screenwriter
