= Winning Ticket =

Japanese-bred Thoroughbred racehorse

Winning Ticket ウイニングチケット
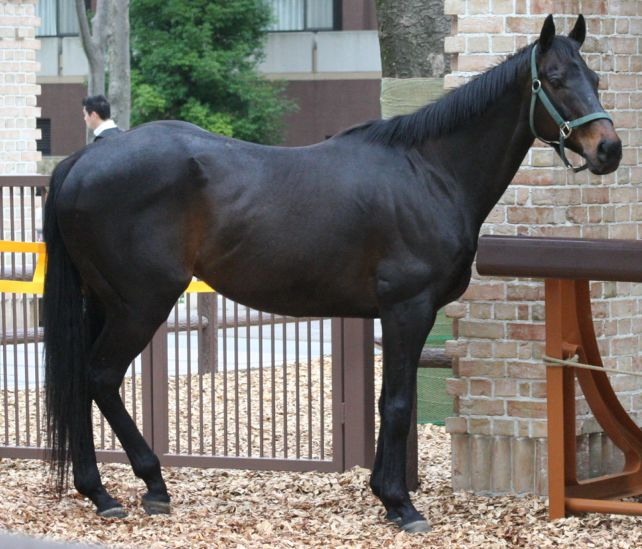
- Winning Ticket at Tokyo Racecourse in 2007
- Breed: Thoroughbred
- Sire: Tony Bin
- Grandsire: Kampala
- Dam: Powerful Lady
- Damsire: Maruzensky
- Sex: Stallion
- Foaled: 21 March 1990
- Died: February 18, 2023 (aged 32)
- Country: Japan
- Colour: Dark bay
- Breeder: Fujiwara Breeding Stud
- Owner: Yoshimi Ota
- Racing colours
- Trainer: Yuji Ito
- Jockey: Masato Shibata
- Record: 14: 6-1-2
- Earnings: 424,125,000 yen

Major wins
- Yayoi Sho (1993); Kyoto Shimbun Hai (1993); Japanese Classic Race wins: Tōkyō Yūshun (1993)

Winning Ticket (Japanese: ウイニングチケット, Hepburn: Uiningu Chiketto; 21 March 1990 – 18 February 2023) was a Japanese Thoroughbred racehorse and stud. He is best known for winning the 1993 Tōkyō Yūshun. Winning Ticket was part of the "BNW" trio along with Biwa Hayahide and Narita Taishin that were rivals challenging for the Japanese Triple Crown. Winning Ticket was also a moderately successful sire after his racing career.

== Background ==
Winning Ticket was foaled 21 March 1990 at Fujiwara Breeding Stud in Shizunai, Hokkaido. Winning Ticket was one of the first significant horses sired by Tony Bin, who would become one of the leading sires in Japan during the 1990s. His dam was Powerful Lady, who was a daughter of JRA Hall of Fame horse Maruzensky. His breeders remarked that Winning Ticket's body shape was nearly identical to Tony Bin's, while his face was nearly identical to that of his great-damsire Tesco Boy. Only three days after Winning Ticket's birth, veteran trainer Yuji Ito visited the Fujiwara farm and, after viewing Winning Ticket, decided to have Winning Ticket admitted to the Ritto Training Center for horse racing and convinced longtime friend and horse owner Yoshimi Ota to buy him.

In autumn of his first year, Winning Ticket began suffering from sesamoiditis, which rendered him unable to even leave his stable for over a month. He did recover from the illness, and eventually grew to be healthy. In the spring of 1992, Winning Ticket was moved to Yuji Ito's stables for race training. Shortly after, Ito asked veteran jockey Masato Shibata to ride Winning Ticket once the horse began racing, stating to Shibata that Winning Ticket was a horse that could win the Tōkyō Yūshun, a race that Shibata had not yet won as a jockey despite having raced since 1967.

== Racing career ==
=== 1992: two-year-old season ===
Winning Ticket made his racing debut at Hakodate Racecourse in September 1992, where he finished fifth. A week later, Winning Ticket was entered in to another maiden race at Hakodate, this time jockeyed by Norihiro Yokoyama. This time Winning Ticket took victory, the first of his career. He was then rested until December, where he was then entered in to two open races at Nakayama Racecourse - the Habotan Sho and the Hopeful Stakes. He won both of these races, marking him as a contender for his three-year-old season.

=== 1993: three-year-old season ===
Winning Ticket's next race was the Yayoi Sho, a Grade II race often used as preparation for the Triple Crown. Winning Ticket was the favorite ahead of Narita Taishin. Winning Ticket took victory in the race, in the process earning entry to the Triple Crown races. Winning Ticket was then entered in to the triple crown, with his next race being the Satsuki Shō. Winning Ticket was the pre-race favorite ahead of Biwa Hayahide and Narita Taishin. In the race, Winning Ticket held with the leaders for much of the race, but was unable keep up in the final stretch and fell to fifth, while Narita Taishin took a narrow victory ahead of Biwa Hayahide. Post-race, Galleon, the horse the originally finished third, was disqualified for obstructing another runner, promoting Winning Ticket to a fourth place finish and guaranteeing him entry in the Tōkyō Yūshun.

Winning Ticket's next race was the Tōkyō Yūshun. Winning Ticket was the favorite again, once more ahead of Biwa Hayahide and Narita Taishin. In the race, the battle for victory was between these three horses, with Winning Ticket pulling ahead in the last stretch to win by 1 1/4 lengths over Biwa Hayahide, with Narita Taishin coming in third. With a winning time of 2:25.5, Winning Ticket ran the second-fastest Tōkyō Yūshun to that point, with only Ines Fujin's run in 1990 being faster. For 44-year-old jockey Masato Shibata, it was his first victory in the Tōkyō Yūshun in his 19th attempt at the event.

After the Tōkyō Yūshun, Winning Ticket was sent to Shadai Farm in Chitose, Hokkaido to recover during the summer. He returned to racing at the Kyoto Shimbun Hai in October in preparation for running the Kikuka-shō, the final leg of the Triple Crown. Winning Ticket won the Kyoto Shimbun Hai. At the Kikuka-shō, Winning Ticket entered as the second favorite behind Biwa Hayahide. Biwa Hayahide won, while Winning Ticket finished third. Their other rival Narita Taishin finished a distant 17th after suffering an injury during the summer. At the end of November, Winning Ticket was entered in to the Japan Cup; Winning Ticket finished third again, three lengths behind Legacy World. To end the year, Winning Ticket was entered in to the Arima Kinen, but was not able to keep up with the leaders and finished only 11th.

=== 1994: four-year-old season ===
Winning Ticket did not race again until July of 1994. At this point, jockey Masato Shibata had suffered career-ending injuries in a fall while riding a different horse, and so Yoshitomi Shibata was hired to ride Winning Ticket in his next race, the Takamatsunomiya Kinen. He was the favorite for this race, but only managed to finish fifth. His next race was in September at the Sankei Sho All Comers. Now jockeyed by Yutaka Take, Winning Ticket finished second to his rival Biwa Hayahide. At the end of October, Winning Ticket was entered in to the autumn Tenno Sho. He was the second favorite, but he finished in a distant eighth place. After the race, it was discovered that he had developed tendinitis, which would have a long recovery time. Due to the injury, the Tenno Sho would be Winning Ticket's final race, and he was officially retired from racing in February 1995.

== Retirement ==
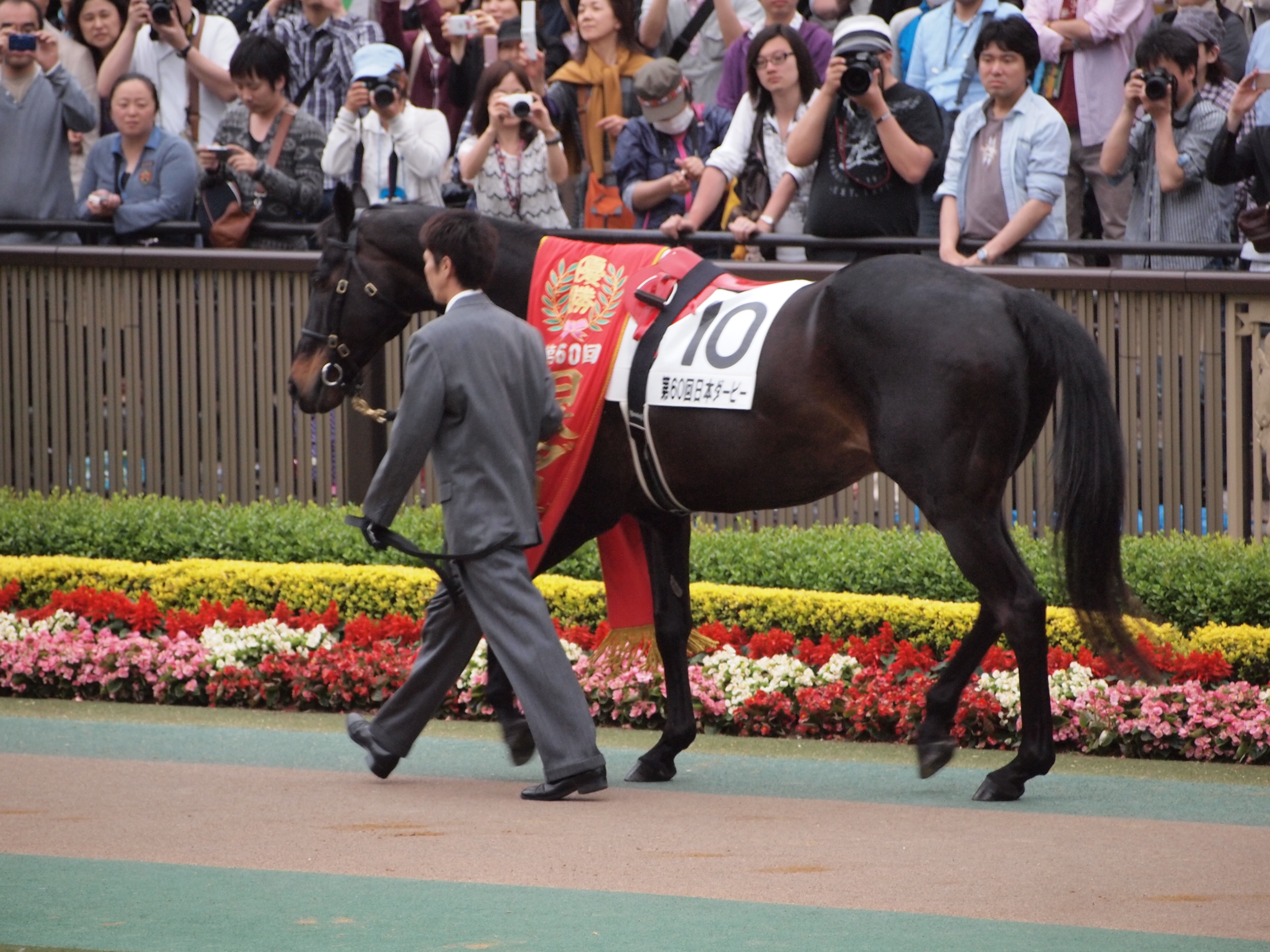
Winning Ticket being paraded at Tokyo Racecourse in 2013

Winning Ticket was retired to stud at Shizunai Stallion Station in Hokkaidō. While never a leading sire, Winning Ticket was moderately successful as a stallion, producing multiple winners of local level graded races. Winning Ticket's most notable offspring was Berg Ticket, who won the Grade 3 Fairy Stakes in 1999. Winning Ticket has also seen some success as a broodmare sire through his daughter Oyster Ticket, who produced horses capable of qualifying for G1 races. Through Oyster Ticket, Winning Ticket is the great-damsire of Lei Papale, the 2021 Ōsaka Hai winner, and of Shining Lei, the 2014 Hopeful Stakes winner. Winning Ticket was retired from stud in 2005.

After being retired from stud, Winning Ticket was moved to the Urakawa Yushun Village AERU in Urakawa, Hokkaido. In retirement, Winning Ticket spent much of his time grazing with fellow racehorses Dai Yusaku and Hishi Masaru. When the horse Legacy World died in 2021, Winning Ticket became the oldest living G1 race winner.

Winning Ticket died on 18 February 2023 at age 32 due to colic.

== In popular culture ==
An anthropomorphized version of Winning Ticket appears in the Japanese media franchise Umamusume: Pretty Derby, voiced by Yui Watanabe. She is depicted as a straightforward, loudmouthed, and enthusiastic girl who is prone to overreacting with intense emotional outbursts, especially uncontrollable sobbing, from even the most mundane situations, and has a childhood dream of winning the Tōkyō Yūshun which she pursues with a fervent determination. Similar to her real-life counterpart, her 1993 Triple Crown rivals, Narita Taishin and Biwa Hayahide, are her best friends and teammates in the anime series, making up the "BNW" trio.

== Racing Record ==
Winning Ticket participated in 14 races in his career, winning 6.

Date	Age	Track	Race	Grade	Distance (condition)	Field	Finish	Time	Winning (Losing) Margin	Jockey	Winner (Runner-up)
6 Sep, 1992	2	Hakodate	Two Year Old Newcomers		Turf 1200 m (Heavy)	14	5th	1:16.4	(3 lengths)	Masato Shibata	Multi
13 Sep, 1992	2	Hakodate	Two Year Old Newcomers		Turf 1700 m (Soft)	12	1st	1:48.8	1 1/4 lengths	Norihiro Yokoyama	(Hinode Cross O)
6 Dec, 1992	2	Nakayama	Habotan Sho	OP	Turf 2000 m (Firm)	9	1st	2:02.9	3/4 lengths	Katsuharu Tanaka	(Major Winner)
27 Dec, 1992	2	Nakayama	Hopeful Stakes	OP	Turf 2000 m (Firm)	7	1st	2:02.3	3 lengths	Masato Shibata	(Maillot Jaune)
7 Mar, 1993	3	Nakayama	Yayoi Sho	G2	Turf 2000 m (Firm)	11	1st	2:00.1	2 lengths	Masato Shibata	(Narita Taishin)
18 Apr, 1993	3	Nakayama	Satsuki Shō	G1	Turf 2000 m (Firm)	18	4th	2:00.6	(2 lengths)	Masato Shibata	Narita Taishin
30 May, 1993	3	Tokyo	Tōkyō Yūshun	G1	Turf 2400 m (Firm)	18	1st	2:25.5	1/2 lengths	Masato Shibata	(Biwa Hayahide)
17 Oct, 1993	3	Kyoto	Kyoto Shimbun Hai	G2	Turf 2200 m (Firm)	10	1st	2:13.3	neck	Masato Shibata	(Maillot Jaune)
7 Nov, 1993	3	Kyoto	Kikuka-shō	G1	Turf 3000 m (Firm)	18	3rd	3:05.7	(5 1/2 lengths)	Masato Shibata	Biwa Hayahide
28 Nov, 1993	3	Tokyo	Japan Cup	G1	Turf 2400 m (Firm)	16	3rd	2:24.6	(1/2 length)	Masato Shibata	Legacy World
26 Dec, 1993	3	Nakayama	Arima Kinen	G1	Turf 2500 m (Firm)	14	11th	2:32.6	(10 1/2 lengths)	Masato Shibata	Tokai Teio
10 Jul, 1994	4	Chukyo	Takamatsunomiya Kinen	G2	Turf 2000 m (Firm)	13	5th	2:01.7	(6 lengths)	Yoshitomi Shibata	Nice Nature
18 Sep, 1994	4	Nakayama	Sankei Sho All Comers	G3	Turf 2200 m (Soft)	8	2nd	2:14.5	(1 3/4 lengths)	Yutaka Take	Biwa Hayahide
30 Oct, 1994	4	Tokyo	Tenno Sho (Autumn)	G1	Turf 2000 m (Firm)	13	8th	1:59.2	(3 lengths)	Yutaka Take	Nehai Caesar

== Pedigree ==
Pedigree of Winning Ticket, dark bay, foaled 21 March 1990
Sire Tony Bin (IRE) 1983	Kampala (GBR); 1976	Kalamoun (GBR); 1970	Zeddaan (GBR); 1965
Sire Tony Bin (IRE) 1983	Kampala (GBR); 1976	Kalamoun (GBR); 1970	Khairunissa (GBR); 1960
Sire Tony Bin (IRE) 1983	Kampala (GBR); 1976	State Pension (GBR); 1967	Only For Life (GBR); 1960
Sire Tony Bin (IRE) 1983	Kampala (GBR); 1976	State Pension (GBR); 1967	Lorelei (GBR); 1950
Sire Tony Bin (IRE) 1983	Severn Bridge (GBR); 1965	Hornbeam (GBR); 1956	Hyperion (GBR); 1930
Sire Tony Bin (IRE) 1983	Severn Bridge (GBR); 1965	Hornbeam (GBR); 1956	Thicket (GBR); 1947
Sire Tony Bin (IRE) 1983	Severn Bridge (GBR); 1965	Priddy Fair (GBR); 1956	Preciptic (GBR); 1942
Sire Tony Bin (IRE) 1983	Severn Bridge (GBR); 1965	Priddy Fair (GBR); 1956	Campanette (GBR); 1948
Dam Powerful Lady (JPN) 1981	Maruzensky (JPN); 1974	Nijinsky (CAN); 1967	Northern Dancer (CAN); 1961
Dam Powerful Lady (JPN) 1981	Maruzensky (JPN); 1974	Nijinsky (CAN); 1967	Flaming Page (CAN); 1959
Dam Powerful Lady (JPN) 1981	Maruzensky (JPN); 1974	Shill (USA); 1970	Buckpasser (USA); 1963
Dam Powerful Lady (JPN) 1981	Maruzensky (JPN); 1974	Shill (USA); 1970	Quill (USA); 1956
Dam Powerful Lady (JPN) 1981	Roch Tesco (JPN); 1975	Tesco Boy (GBR); 1963	Princely Gift (GBR); 1951
Dam Powerful Lady (JPN) 1981	Roch Tesco (JPN); 1975	Tesco Boy (GBR); 1963	Suncourt (GBR); 1952
Dam Powerful Lady (JPN) 1981	Roch Tesco (JPN); 1975	Star Roch (JPN); 1957	Harroway (GBR); 1940
Dam Powerful Lady (JPN) 1981	Roch Tesco (JPN); 1975	Star Roch (JPN); 1957	Corona (JPN) (Family:11-c); 1943

== See also ==
- Biwa Hayahide and Narita Taishin - Winning Ticket's rivals during the 1993 Japanese Triple Crown; the trio became known as "BNW", a combination of their initials.
