= Narita Taishin =

Japanese-bred Thoroughbred racehorse

Narita Taishin ナリタタイシン
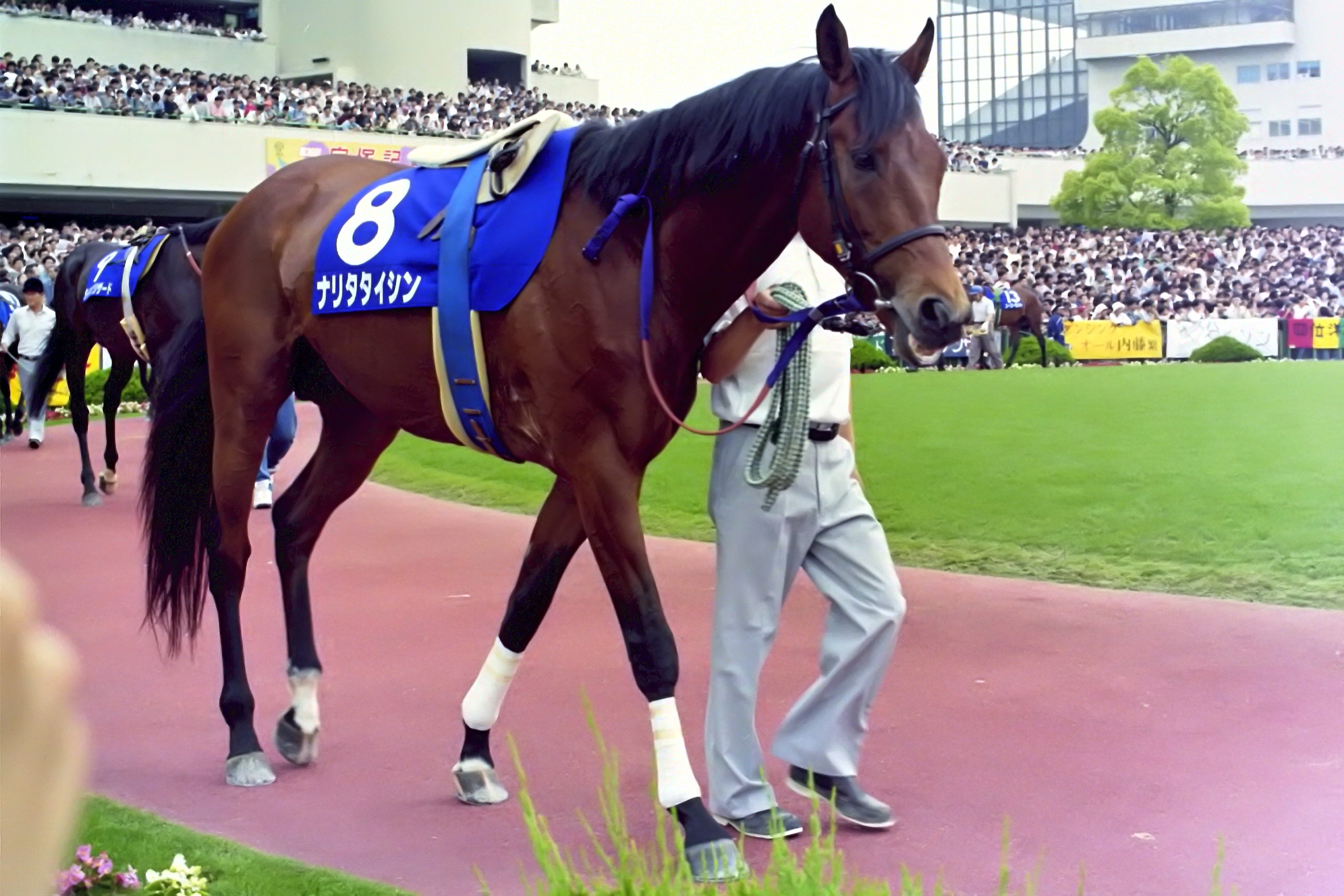
- Narita Taishin before the 1995 Takarazuka Kinen
- Breed: Thoroughbred
- Sire: Rivlia
- Grandsire: Riverman
- Dam: Taishin Lily
- Damsire: Ladiga
- Sex: Stallion
- Foaled: 10 June 1990
- Died: 13 April 2020 (aged 29)
- Country: Japan
- Colour: Bay
- Breeder: Etsuo Kawakami
- Owner: Hidenori Yamaji
- Racing colours
- Trainer: Masaaki Okubo
- Jockey: Eiji Shimizu; Yutaka Take
- Record: 15: 4-6-1
- Earnings: ¥397,408,000

Major wins
- Radio Tampa Hai Sansai Stakes (1992); Meguro Kinen (1994); Japanese Classic Race wins: Satsuki Shō (1993)

Narita Taishin (Japanese: ナリタタイシン; Hepburn: Narita Taishin; 10 June 1990 – 13 April 2020) was a Japanese Thoroughbred racehorse and sire. He was best known for winning the Satsuki Shō in 1993. Narita Taishin was part of the "BNW" trio along with Biwa Hayahide and Winning Ticket that were rivals challenging for the Japanese Triple Crown.

== Racing career ==
=== 1992: two-year-old season ===
Narita Taishin made his racing debut at Sapporo Racecourse in July 1992. He managed only a fifth place finish, and afterwards was rested for several months to ease fatigue in his legs. He returned to racing in October at Fukushima Racecourse, where he won his first race. He continued with more ungraded races, including finishing second at both the Fukushima Sansai Stakes at Fukushima Racecourse and the Senryo Stakes at Hanshin Racecourse. At the end of the year, he was entered in to the Radio Tampa Hai Sansai Stakes, his first graded stakes event. Narita Taishin won the race, marking his first major victory.

=== 1993: three-year-old season ===
Narita Taishin's 1993 season began at the Grade II Shinzan Kinen in January, where he finished second to Amber Lion. In March, Narita Taishin was entered in to the Yayoi Sho in preparation for entering the Triple Crown races. Beginning at this race, Yutaka Take was hired as Narita Taishin's jockey. Narita Taishin finished second again, this time losing to Winning Ticket, who would become one of his chief rivals during the Triple Crown.

Narita Taishin's next race was the Satsuki Sho, the first leg of the Triple Crown. He entered this race as the third favorite, behind Winning Ticket and Biwa Hayahide, who had just come off winning the Wakaba Stakes. In the race, Narita Taishin stayed near the back for most of the race, but in the final straight charged through the field and narrowly took victory over Biwa Hayahide, with the official margin being a neck. At the second leg of the Triple Crown, the Tokyo Yushun, he once again entered as the third favorite behind Winning Ticket and Biwa Hayahide. Here, he was unable to complete his charge through the field and finished third behind Winning Ticket and Biwa Hayahide.

After the Tōkyō Yūshun, Narita Taishin's schedule was reduced to prepare for the Kikuka Sho in November. In July, Narita Taishin was entered in to the Grade II Takamatsunomiya Hai, but came second behind Longchamp Boy. In autumn, health issues began to plague Narita Taishin. The horse suffered a pulmonary hemorrhage during training, which cancelled plans to race him in the Kyoto Shimbun Hai against Winning Ticket as a preparation race. Narita Taishin was still entered in to the Kikuka Sho, but with the effects of the injury still lingering, he was not competitive in the race and finished 17th – second to last in the 18 horses field. His rivals Biwa Hayahide and Winning Ticket finished first and third, respectively.

=== 1994-1995: four and five-year-old seasons ===
Narita Taishin's four-year-old season began with a victory at the Meguro Kinen in February. With this success, he was entered in to the Tenno Sho in April. He finished second, 1 1/4 lengths behind Biwa Hayahide. The promising start to Narita Taishin's 1994 season ended with more injuries. Shortly after the Tenno Sho, it was discovered that Narita Taishin had a minor fracture in his right-hind leg, which forced him out of competition for several months. He was scheduled to return at the Kyōto Daishōten in October, but intestinal issues forced him out again. Just before the autumn Tenno Sho, he developed tendinitis, another injury that would take months to recover from.

Narita Taishin finally returned to racing at the 1995 Takarazuka Kinen, over 13 months since his last race appearance. With no racing in so long, Narita Taishin's racing condition was poor, and he finished 16th in the 17-horse field. Preparations were made to run him in further races, but during training for the Takamatsunomiya Kinen, tendinitis occurred again, and Narita Taishin was retired from racing.

== Retirement ==
Narita Taishin was retired to stud in 1995 after his failed racing comeback. He did not produce any graded stakes winners, but did have some offspring that won allowance races. His most successful offspring by career earnings were Thurston Girl and Garnet City. However, his performance as a sire did not meet expectations, and he was retired from stud in 2003. He lived the rest of his life at the JRA's Hidaka Training and Research Center in Hidaka, Hokkaido. He died 13 April 2020 at age 29 due to complications from age.

== In popular culture ==
An anthropomorphized version of Narita Taishin appears in the Japanese multimedia franchise Umamusume: Pretty Derby, voiced by Keiko Watanabe. She is depicted as having a cold, prickly, and asocial personality, however this comes from being looked down upon and teased for her small stature which many consider unfit for races, causing her to put her all into her racing out of spite. Despite this cold exterior, Taishin is deeply insecure about her small size, and strives in desperation to exceed her physical limitations, even if it comes at the risk of serious injury. Similar to her real-life counterpart, her 1993 Triple Crown rivals, Biwa Hayahide and Winning Ticket, are her best friends and teammates in the anime series, making up the "BNW" trio.

== Racing record ==
Narita Taishin ran in 15 races taking four victories, including a Grade I victory in the Satsuki Sho.

Date	Age	Race	Grade	Distance (condition)	Track	Field	Finish	Time	Winning (Losing) Margin	Winner (2nd Place)	Jockey
11 Jul 1992	2	Two Year Old Newcomers		Turf 1000m (Firm)	Sapporo	9	6th	1:00.3	(5 1/2 lengths)	Meiner Rockabilly	Norihiro Yokoyama
10 Oct 1992	2	Two Year Old Maiden		Turf 1700m (Good)	Fukushima	5	1st	1:44.7	1 3/4 lengths	(A.P. Iron)	Eiji Shimizu
25 Oct 1992	2	Kinmokusei Tokubetsu	OP	Turf 1700m (Firm)	Fukushima	9	6th	1:46.3	(4 1/2 lengths)	Mayano Galaxy	Masahiro Uchiyama
21 Nov 1992	2	Fukushima Sansai Stakes	OP	Turf 1200m (Firm)	Fukushima	10	2nd	1:10.7	(1 length)	Saint Glory	Eiji Shimizu
19 Dec 1992	2	Senryo Sho	OP	Turf 1600m (Firm)	Hanshin	11	2nd	1:38.2	(1/2 length)	Grand Shingeki	Eiji Shimizu
26 Dec 1992	2	Radio Tampa Hai Sansai Stakes	GIII	Turf 2000m (Firm)	Hanshin	12	1st	2:05.8	1/2 length	(Marukatsu Oja)	Eiji Shimizu
17 Jan 1993	3	Shinzan Kinen	GIII	Turf 1600m (Firm)	Kyoto	13	2nd	1:36.0	(1/2 length)	Amber Lion	Eiji Shimizu
7 Mar 1993	3	Yayoi Sho	GII	Turf 2000m (Firm)	Nakayama	11	2nd	2:00.4	(2 lengths)	Winning Ticket	Yutaka Take
18 Apr 1993	3	Satsuki Sho	GI	Turf 2000m (Firm)	Nakayama	18	1st	R2:00.2	neck	(Biwa Hayahide)	Yutaka Take
30 May 1993	3	Tokyo Yushun	GI	Turf 2400m (Firm)	Tokyo	18	3rd	2:25.8	(1 3/4 lengths)	Winning Ticket	Yutaka Take
11 Jul 1993	3	Takamatsunomiya Hai	GII	Turf 2000m (Firm)	Kyoto	14	2nd	1:59.2	(1 1/2 lengths)	Longchamp Boy	Yutaka Take
7 Nov 1993	3	Kikuka Sho	GI	Turf 3000m (Firm)	Kyoto	18	17th	3:14.1	(56 lengths)	Biwa Hayahide	Yutaka Take
20 Feb 1994	4	Meguro Kinen	GII	Turf 2500m (Firm)	Tokyo	13	1st	2:34.0	head	(Dancing Surpass)	Yutaka Take
24 Apr 1994	4	Tenno Sho (Spring)	GI	Turf 3200m (Good)	Hanshin	11	2nd	3:22.8	(1 1/4 lengths)	Biwa Hayahide	Yutaka Take
4 Jun 1995	5	Takarazuka Kinen	GI	Turf 2200m (Good)	Kyoto	17	16th	2:12.1	(15 1/2 lengths)	Dantsu Seattle	Taisei Yamada

Legend:
*R indicated that it was a record finish time.

== Pedigree ==
Pedigree of Narita Taishin (JPN), bay, 1990
Sire Rivlia (USA) 1982	Riverman (FR); 1969	Never Bend (USA); 1960	Nasrullah; 1940
Sire Rivlia (USA) 1982	Riverman (FR); 1969	Never Bend (USA); 1960	Lalun; 1952
Sire Rivlia (USA) 1982	Riverman (FR); 1969	River Lady (USA); 1963	Prince John; 1953
Sire Rivlia (USA) 1982	Riverman (FR); 1969	River Lady (USA); 1963	Nile Lily; 1954
Sire Rivlia (USA) 1982	Dahlia (USA); 1970	Vaguely Noble (IRE); 1965	Vienna; 1957
Sire Rivlia (USA) 1982	Dahlia (USA); 1970	Vaguely Noble (IRE); 1965	Noble Lassie; 1956
Sire Rivlia (USA) 1982	Dahlia (USA); 1970	Charming Alibi (USA); 1963	Honeys Alibi; 1952
Sire Rivlia (USA) 1982	Dahlia (USA); 1970	Charming Alibi (USA); 1963	Adorada II; 1947
Dam Taishin Lily (JPN) 1981	Ladiga (USA); 1969	Graustark (USA); 1963	Ribot; 1952
Dam Taishin Lily (JPN) 1981	Ladiga (USA); 1969	Graustark (USA); 1963	Flower Bowl; 1952
Dam Taishin Lily (JPN) 1981	Ladiga (USA); 1969	Celia (USA); 1960	Swaps; 1952
Dam Taishin Lily (JPN) 1981	Ladiga (USA); 1969	Celia (USA); 1960	Pocahontas; 1955
Dam Taishin Lily (JPN) 1981	Interlaken (JPN); 1966	Sammy Davis (GBR); 1960	Whistler; 1950
Dam Taishin Lily (JPN) 1981	Interlaken (JPN); 1966	Sammy Davis (GBR); 1960	Samaria; 1955
Dam Taishin Lily (JPN) 1981	Interlaken (JPN); 1966	Silver Fir (GBR); 1962	Abernant; 1946
Dam Taishin Lily (JPN) 1981	Interlaken (JPN); 1966	Silver Fir (GBR); 1962	Moyo (Family:1-w); 1955

== See also ==
- Biwa Hayahide and Winning Ticket - Narita Taishin's rivals during the 1993 Japanese Triple Crown; the trio became known as "BNW", a combination of their initials.
