= Manhattan Cafe =

Japanese-bred Thoroughbred racehorse

Manhattan Cafe マンハッタンカフェ
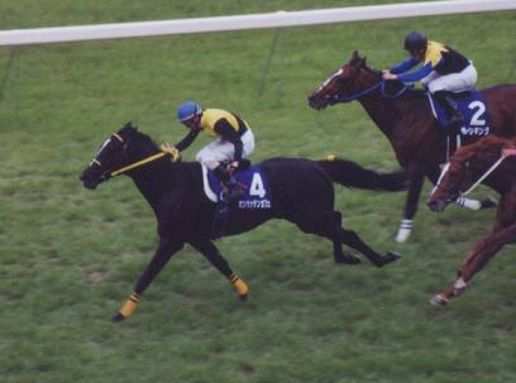
- Manhattan Cafe racing at the 2002 Spring Tennō Shō.
- Breed: Thoroughbred
- Sire: Sunday Silence (USA)
- Grandsire: Halo (USA)
- Dam: Subtle Change (IRE)
- Damsire: Law Society (USA)
- Sex: Stallion
- Foaled: March 5, 1998
- Died: August 13, 2015 (aged 17)
- Country: Japan
- Colour: Brown
- Breeder: Shadai Farm
- Owner: Ken Nishikawa
- Racing colours
- Trainer: Futoshi Kojima
- Jockey: Masayoshi Ebina
- Record: 12: 6-0-1
- Earnings: ¥522,834,000

Major wins
- Arima Kinen (2001); Tenno Sho (Spring) (2002); Japanese Classic Race wins: Kikuka Sho (2001)

Awards
- JRA Award for Best Older Male Horse (2002); Leading sire in Japan (2009)

Manhattan Cafe (Japanese: マンハッタンカフェ; Hepburn: Manhattan Kafe; 5 March 1998 – 13 August 2015) was a Japanese Thoroughbred racehorse and sire. Unraced as a juvenile, he began his racing career as a three-year-old in 2001. He improved throughout the season, winning three minor races before developing into a top class stayer in autumn when he recorded Grade I wins in the Kikuka Sho and the Arima Kinen. He won the Tennō Shō as a four-year-old and was retired from racing after an unsuccessful bid for the Prix de l'Arc de Triomphe. Manhattan Cafe later became a highly successful breeding stallion. He died in 2015.

== Background ==
Manhattan Cafe was a brown horse standing 16.3 hands (1.70 metres) with a narrow white blaze bred in Hokkaido, Japan by Shadai Farms. He was sired by Sunday Silence, who won the 1989 Kentucky Derby, before retiring to stud in Japan where he was champion sire on thirteen consecutive occasions. His other major winners included Deep Impact, Stay Gold, Heart's Cry, Zenno Rob Roy and Neo Universe. Manhattan Cafe's dam Subtle Change won three races in Ireland before being exported to become a broodmare in Japan. She was a descendant of the outstanding German broodmare Schwarzblaurot, the ancestor of numerous major winners including Sagace, Slip Anchor, Stacelita, Zagreb and Buena Vista.

As a foal, the colt was put up for auction at the JRHA Select Sale and was sold for ¥136,500,000. He entered the ownership of Ken Nishikawa and was sent into training with Futoshi Kojima. He was ridden in most of his races by Masayoshi Ebina.

== Racing career ==
=== 2001: three-year-old season ===
Manhattan Cafe began his racing career in a maiden race over 2,000 metres at Tokyo Racecourse on January 29 in which he finished third of the fifteen runners behind Treasure. He recorded his first success in a similar event over 1,800 metres at the same track twelve days later, winning from Isao Heat. The colt was then stepped up in class for the Grade II Hochi Hai Yayoi Sho (a major trial for the Satsuki Sho) over 2,000 metres at Nakayama Racecourse on March 4 and finished fourth behind Agnes Tachyon. On his final start of his spring campaign, Manhattan Cafe finished unplaced behind Scenography in the Azarea Sho at Hanshin Racecourse in April.

After a break of almost four months, Manhattan Cafe returned in August for two races at Sapporo Racecourse. Racing over 2,600 metres he won the Furano Tokubetsu on the fourth of the month and followed up in the Akanko Tokubetsu over the same distance three weeks later. On September 16 the colt was moved back up to Grade II level for the St Lite Kinen over 2,200 metres at Nakayama and finished fourth of the sixteen runners behind Shinko Calido, Treasure and Lord Forester. Manhattan Cafe was then moved up further in class for the Grade I Kikuka-sho over 3,000 metres at Kyoto Racecourse on October 21 and started a x/1 outsider in a fifteen-runner field. His opponents included Jungle Pocket and Dantsu Flame who had finished first and second in the Tokyo Yushun. The outsider Meiner Despot took the lead from the start and set a slow pace with Ebina positioning Manhattan Cafe behind the leaders on the inside. Manhattan Cafe overtook Meiner Despot in the straight and won by half a length, with few of the most fancied runners ever making a challenge. After the race, Futoshi Kojima said "When I saw the start and him going into the turn on the first lap, I thought we had a chance of winning. He was relaxed and the others weren't coping well. I knew we had the best horse for such a pace over the distance."

Manhattan Cafe was one of the horses invited to contest the Arima Kinen at Nakayama on December 23, a race which saw him matched against older horses for the first time. His opponents included T. M. Opera O, T. M. Ocean (Hanshin Juvenile Fillies, Oka Sho, Shuka Sho), Narita Top Road, Shinko Calido, Meisho Doto, and To The Victory (Queen Elizabeth II Commemorative Cup). He was restrained by Ebina before producing a strong late run to take the lead 150 metres from the finish and won by one and a quarter lengths from American Boss with To The Victory a neck away in third.

=== 2002: four-year-old season ===
On March 23, 2002, Manhattan Cafe began his second season in the Grade II Nikkei Sho at Nakayama. He started favourite but finished only sixth of the eight runners behind Active Bio. On his next appearance he was one of eleven horses to contest the spring edition of the Tenno Sho over 3,200 metres at Kyoto on April 28. Narita Top Road started favourite with Manhattan Cafe next in the betting on 1.9/1 ahead of Jungle Pocket and Sunrise Pegasus. Ridden as usual by Ebina, he won by a neck and half a length from Jungle Pocket and Narita Top Road.

Manhattan Cafe was rested until autumn when he was sent to Europe to contest the 81st running of the Prix de l'Arc de Triomphe over 2,400 metres as Longchamp Racecourse on October 6. Starting at odds of 8.3/1 he turned into the straight in seventh place but faded to finish thirteenth of the sixteen runners behind Marienbard. The loss of speed was attributed to an injury, as signs of tendonitis in the left foreleg were discovered after the race. He was retired immediately, before undergoing further examination.

At the JRA Awards for that year, he received 146 of the 281 votes cast, earning the JRA Award for Best Older Male Horse.

== Retirement and stud career ==
An official retirement ceremony was held on December 22 at Nakayama Racecourse, on the day of the Arima Kinen. He was presented wearing the saddlecloth bearing the number "4" from the previous year's Arima Kinen, ridden by jockey Yutaka Take in a blue cap and racing silks. Although he was able to carry Take on his back, his injury prevented him from walking under his own power, and he was instead led by handlers.

After his retirement from racing, Manhattan Cafe became a breeding stallion at the Shadai Stallion Station in Hokkaido where he replaced his recently deceased sire. He was the Leading sire in Japan in 2009.

Manhattan Cafe was also a broodmare sire, siring the dams of T O Keynes (2021 Teio Sho, Champions Cup), Meisho Hario (2022 and 2023 Teio Sho, 2023 Kashiwa Kinen, 2025 Kawasaki Kinen), Tastiera (2023 Tōkyō Yūshun, 2025 Queen Elizabeth II Cup), Peptide Nile (2024 February Stakes), T O Royal (2024 Spring Tenno Sho) and Soul Rush (2024 Mile Championship, 2025 Dubai Turf).

Manhattan Cafe died at the age of seventeen on August 13, 2015. He was found collapsed out in the pasture. Despite being in poor health in the time leading up to his death, he had been bred to 126 mares with 46 producing foals. A post mortem autopsy that was performed discovered he had an abdominal tumor.

=== Major winners ===
c = colt, f = filly, g = gelding
bold = G1/Jpn1 stakes

Grade One winners
Foaled	Name	Sex	Major Wins
2006	Jo Cappuccino	c	Falcon Stakes, **NHK Mile Cup**, Silk Road Stakes
2006	Red Desire	f	**Shuka Sho**, Al Maktoum Challenge
2007	Hiruno d'Amour	c	Sankei Ōsaka Hai, **Tennō Shō (Spring)**
2008	Grape Brandy	g	**Japan Dirt Derby**, Tokai Stakes, **February Stakes**
2012	Queens Ring	f	Fillies' Revue, Kyoto Himba Stakes, Fuchu Himba Stakes, **Queen Elizabeth II Cup**

Other winners
Foaled	Name	Sex	Major Wins
2004	Manhattan Sky	c	Fukushima Kinen
2004	Seraphic Romp	f	Aichi Hai (twice)
2004	Urbanity	c	Ocean Stakes
2005	Meisho Qualia	c	Kyoto Shimbun Hai
2005	Oriental Rock	c	Sapporo Nisai Stakes
2005	Red Agate	f	Flora Stakes
2006	Antonio Barows	c	Shinzan Kinen
2006	A Shin Moreover	c	Nagoya Grand Prix (twice), Hakusan Daishoten (twice)
2006	Best Member	c	Kyoto Shimbun Hai
2006	Fumino Imagine	f	Fukushima Himba Stakes, Mermaid Stakes, Aichi Hai, Sapporo Kinen
2006	I Ko Piko	c	Kobe Shimbun Hai
2006	T M Aurora	f	Fuchu Himba Stakes
2007	Aroma Cafe	c	Radio Nikkei Sho
2007	Garbo	c	Shinzan Kinen, Tokyo Shimbun Hai, Lord Derby Challenge Trophy, Hakodate Sprint Stakes
2007	Gestalt	c	Kyoto Shimbun Hai
2007	Hansode Bando	c	Kyodo Tsushin Hai
2007	San Diego City	c	Sapporo Nisai Stakes
2008	Shonan Mighty	c	Sankei Ōsaka Hai
2008	Trend Hunter	f	Flower Cup
2009	Love Is Boo Shet	c	Hakodate Kinen
2009	Meisho Columbo	c	Hyogo Gold Trophy, Nagoya Daishoten
2011	Madrid Cafe	c	Kyoto High-jump
2012	Rouge Buck	f	Kisaragi Sho, Epsom Cup, Mainichi Ōkan, Sankei Sho All Comers
2012	Sing with Joy	f	Flora Stakes
2013	Sciacchetra	c	Nikkei Sho, American Jockey Club Cup, Hanshin Daishōten
2014	America's Cup	c	Kisaragi Sho
2014	Dea Regalo	f	Kyoto Himba Stakes
2014	Platinum Bullet	c	Kyoto Shimbun Hai
2014	Queen Mambo	f	Kanto Oaks, Ladies' Prelude
2014	Red en Ciel	c	CBC Sho, Kitakyushu Kinen
2015	Meisho Tekkon	c	Radio Nikkei Sho, Nikkei Sho

== Assessment and awards ==
In January 2003, Manhattan Cafe was voted Best Older Male Horse of 2002 at the JRA Awards.

== In popular culture ==
An anthropomorphized version of Manhattan Cafe appears as a character in the Japanese multimedia franchise Umamusume: Pretty Derby, voiced by Yui Ogura. She is depicted as a mysterious, dark-haired young woman and avid coffee drinker with a dubiously supernatural companion she refers to as her friend and has a similar appearance to; this is likely in reference to Sunday Silence, Manhattan Cafe's real-life sire. She has a friendly rivalry with Agnes Tachyon, whose constant pestering to be her "guinea pig" in her various experiments annoys her, but still cares for her for regardless; Cafe's love of coffee and strong dislike for tea mirrors Tachyon's similar love of tea and her own strong dislike for coffee. Manhattan Cafe is one of the major characters featured in the anime film Umamusume: Pretty Derby – Beginning of a New Era.

== Racing statistics ==
Manhattan Cafe won 6 races out of 12 starts where all his wins but one were on tracks more than 2500 metres in distance. This data is available on JBIS, netkeiba and racingpost.

Date	Age	Course	Race	Class	Distance (Condition)	Field	Odds (Favourite)	Finish	Time	Winning (Losing) Margins	Jockey	Winner (2nd Place)	ref
Jan 29, 2001	3	Tokyo	Three Year Old Debut		Turf 2,000 m (Soft)	15	4.0 (2nd)	3rd	2:06.5	(1 1/2 lengths)	Masayoshi Ebina	Treasure	
Feb 11, 2001	3	Tokyo	Three Year Old		Turf 1,800 m (Firm)	16	1.7 (1st)	1st	1:49.8	1 3/4 lengths	Masayoshi Ebina	(Isao Heat)	
Mar 4, 2001	3	Nakayama	Yayoi Sho	GII	Turf 2,000 m (Heavy)	8	21.4 (5th)	4th	2:06.8	(7 1/4 lengths)	Masayoshi Ebina	Agnes Tachyon	
Apr 7, 2001	3	Hanshin	Azalea Sho	1 Win	Turf 2,000 m (Firm)	16	4.0 (2nd)	11th	2:03.7	(7 3/4 lengths)	Hiroshi Kawachi	Scenography	
Aug 4, 2001	3	Sapporo	Furano Tokubetsu	1 Win	Turf 2,600 m (Firm)	12	2.0 (1st)	1st	2:43.5	2 lengths	Masayoshi Ebina	(Springen)	
Aug 26, 2001	3	Sapporo	Akanko Tokubetsu	2 Win	Turf 2,600 m (Firm)	12	1.8 (1st)	1st	2:43.1	neck	Masayoshi Ebina	(Tosen Thunder)	
Sep 16, 2001	3	Nakayama	St Lite Kinen	GII	Turf 2,200 m (Good)	16	5.3 (3rd)	4th	2:13.8	(4 1/2 lengths)	Sou Nihonyanagi	Shinko Calido	
Oct 21, 2001	3	Kyoto	Kikuka Sho	GI	Turf 3,000 m (Firm)	15	17.1 (6th)	1st	3:07.2	1/2 length	Masayoshi Ebina	(Meiner Despot)	
Dec 23, 2001	3	Nakayama	Arima Kinen	GI	Turf 2,500 m (Firm)	13	7.1 (3rd)	1st	2:33.1	1 1/4 lengths	Masayoshi Ebina	(American Boss)	
Mar 23, 2002	4	Nakayama	Nikkei Sho	GII	Turf 2,500 m (Firm)	8	1.2 (1st)	6th	2:37.5	(3 1/2 lengths)	Masayoshi Ebina	Active Bio	
Apr 28, 2002	4	Kyoto	Tenno Sho (Spring)	GI	Turf 3,200 m (Firm)	11	2.9 (2nd)	1st	3:19.5	neck	Masayoshi Ebina	(Jungle Pocket)	
Oct 6, 2002	4	Longchamp	Prix de l'Arc de Triomphe	GI	Turf 2,400 m (Good)	16	9.3 (7th)	13th	2:30.5	(18 3/4 lengths)	Masayoshi Ebina	Marienbard	

== Pedigree ==
Pedigree of Manhattan Cafe (JPN), brown horse 1998
Sire Sunday Silence (USA) 1986	Halo (USA); 1969	Hail to Reason	Turn-To
Sire Sunday Silence (USA) 1986	Halo (USA); 1969	Hail to Reason	Nothirdchance
Sire Sunday Silence (USA) 1986	Halo (USA); 1969	Cosmah	Cosmic Bomb
Sire Sunday Silence (USA) 1986	Halo (USA); 1969	Cosmah	Almahmoud
Sire Sunday Silence (USA) 1986	Wishing Well (USA); 1975	Understanding	Promised Land
Sire Sunday Silence (USA) 1986	Wishing Well (USA); 1975	Understanding	Pretty Ways
Sire Sunday Silence (USA) 1986	Wishing Well (USA); 1975	Mountain Flower	Montparnasse
Sire Sunday Silence (USA) 1986	Wishing Well (USA); 1975	Mountain Flower	Edelweiss
Dam Subtle Change (IRE) 1988	Law Society (USA); 1982	Alleged	Hoist The Flag
Dam Subtle Change (IRE) 1988	Law Society (USA); 1982	Alleged	Princess Pout
Dam Subtle Change (IRE) 1988	Law Society (USA); 1982	Bold Bikini	Boldnesian
Dam Subtle Change (IRE) 1988	Law Society (USA); 1982	Bold Bikini	Ran Tan
Dam Subtle Change (IRE) 1988	Santa Luciana (GER); 1973	Luciano	Henry the Seventh
Dam Subtle Change (IRE) 1988	Santa Luciana (GER); 1973	Luciano	Light Arctic
Dam Subtle Change (IRE) 1988	Santa Luciana (GER); 1973	Suleika	Ticino
Dam Subtle Change (IRE) 1988	Santa Luciana (GER); 1973	Suleika	Schwarzblaurot (Family 16-c)
