= Hishi Miracle =

Japanese Thoroughbred racehorse (foaled 1999)

Hishi Miracle ヒシミラクル
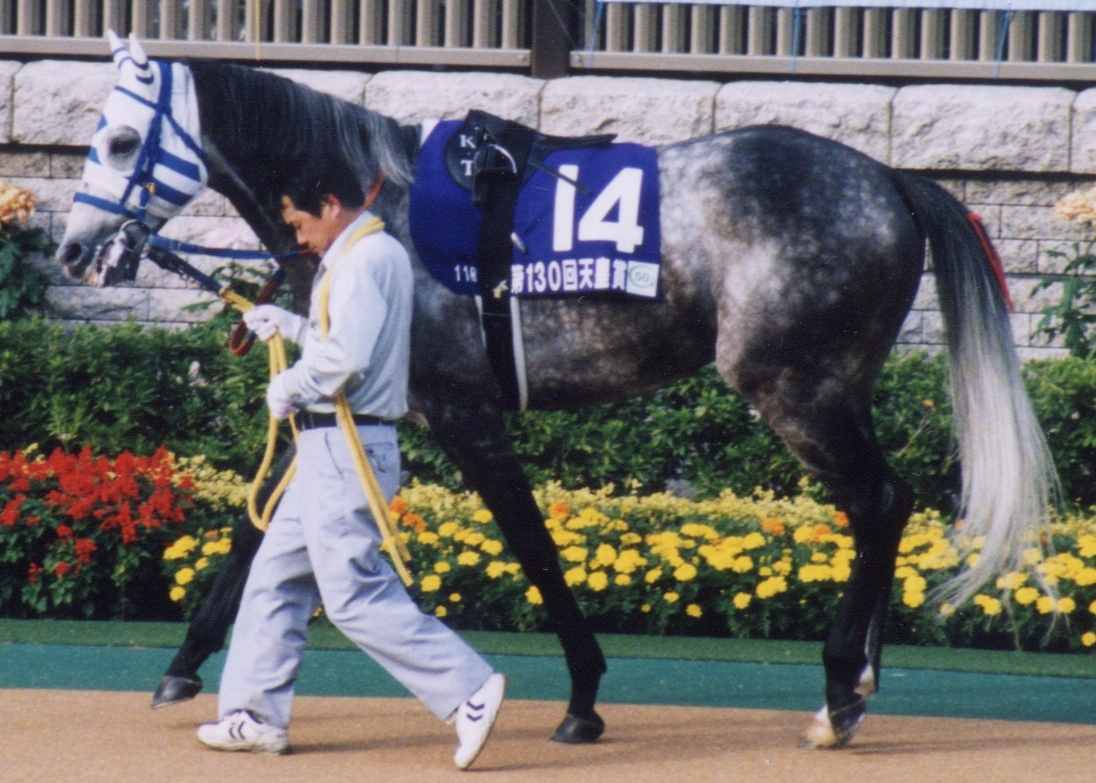
- Hishi Miracle at the paddock of the 2004 Autumn Tennō Shō.
- Breed: Thoroughbred
- Sire: Soccer Boy (JPN)
- Grandsire: Dictus (FR)
- Dam: Shunsaku Yoshiko (JPN)
- Damsire: Shady Heights (GB)
- Sex: Stallion
- Foaled: March 31, 1999 (age 27)
- Country: Japan
- Colour: Gray
- Breeder: Otsuka Bokujo
- Owner: Masaichiro Abe
- Racing colours
- Trainer: Masaru Sayama
- Jockey: Koichi Tsunoda
- Record: 28: 6-3-4
- Earnings: ¥514,989,000

Major wins
- Tenno Sho (Spring) (2003); Takarazuka Kinen (2003); Japanese Classic Race wins: Kikuka Sho (2002)

Awards
- JRA Award for Best Japanese-Bred Horse (2003)

Hishi Miracle (Japanese: ヒシミラクル, Hepburn: Hishi Mirakuru; foaled 31 March 1999) is a retired Japanese Thoroughbred racehorse and former sire. He competed from 2001 to 2005, recording six wins in twenty-eight starts, including the Kikuka Sho in 2002, and the Tenno Sho (Spring) and Takarazuka Kinen in 2003. He received the JRA Award for Best Japanese-Bred Horse in 2003.

== Background ==
Hishi Miracle is a gray stallion bred in Mitsuishi, Hokkaido, by Otsuka Bokujo. He was sired by Soccer Boy, and his dam was Shunsaku Yoshiko, a daughter of Shady Heights. He was purchased for ¥6.5 million by Masaichiro Abe at the 2001 Hidaka Light Horse Agricultural Cooperative Training Sale and sent into training with Masaru Sayama at the JRA's Ritto Training Center.

== Racing career ==
=== 2001: Two-year-old season ===
Hishi Miracle debuted on August 11, 2001, in a maiden race on the turf at Kokura Racecourse, finishing seventh. He ran in three subsequent 1200-meter maiden races, finishing outside the top five. Transitioning to longer distances, he finished fifth over 2000 meters at Kyoto Racecourse in October, second over 1800 meters later that month, and third over 1800 meters in November.

=== 2002: Three-year-old season ===
Hishi Miracle returned in April 2002, finishing fourth and sixth in two maiden races at Kyoto. He recorded his first victory on May 26 in a 2000-meter maiden race at Chukyo Racecourse. He subsequently won the Urafu Tokubetsu at Hanshin Racecourse in June and the Nowaki Tokubetsu at Hanshin in September.

On September 22, he contested the Kobe Shimbun Hai (GII) at Hanshin, finishing sixth. Failing to secure priority entry, his connections paid a supplementary entry fee to enter the Kikuka Sho (GI) at Kyoto on October 20. Starting as the 10th favorite, he advanced on the final turn and won by a nose over Fast Tateyama. He concluded his three-year-old season by finishing eleventh in the Arima Kinen (GI) at Nakayama Racecourse.

=== 2003: Four-year-old season ===
Hishi Miracle began his 2003 campaign by finishing twelfth in the Hanshin Daishoten (GII) and seventh in the Sankei Osaka Hai (GII). On May 4, he entered the Tenno Sho (Spring, GI) at Kyoto. Starting as the 7th favorite, he rallied from the rear to win the 3200-meter race by 0.1 seconds over Sunrise Jaeger.

On June 29, he contested the Takarazuka Kinen (GI) at Hanshin. Ridden by Koichi Tsunoda, he tracked the leaders and won by a neck over Tsurumaru Boy, securing his third GI victory. In the autumn, he finished second in the Kyoto Daishoten (GII) behind Tap Dance City. Following the race, he was diagnosed with suspensory ligament desmitis in his right foreleg and was sidelined for the remainder of the year.

=== 2004: Five-year-old season ===
Returning from a year-long layoff, Hishi Miracle finished sixteenth in the Tenno Sho (Autumn, GI) at Tokyo Racecourse in October. He subsequently finished ninth in the Japan Cup (GI) and fourteenth in the Arima Kinen (GI).

=== 2005: Six-year-old season ===
Hishi Miracle finished third in the Kyoto Kinen (GII) in February. He cottested in his final race in the Tenno Sho (Spring, GI) on May 1, finishing sixteenth. Following the event, a recurrence of his suspensory ligament injury was confirmed. He was officially retired from racing on May 20, 2005.

== Stud career ==
Following his retirement, Hishi Miracle stood at Rex Stud in Shizunai, Hokkaido. He sired 30 registered foals over five seasons before retiring from stud duties in 2010. His most notable progeny was Hishi Diana, who won multiple regional stakes races in the NAR. He currently resides at Nakamura Masaaki Bokujo in Urakawa, Hokkaido, where he works as a teaser.

c = colt, f = filly

Foaled	Name	Sex	Colour	Sire	Major wins
2008	Hishi Diana	f	Gray	Wavering Monarch	Hanafubuki Sho, Hien Sho

== In popular culture ==
An anthropomorphized version of Hishi Miracle appears as a character in the Japanese multimedia franchise Umamusume: Pretty Derby, voiced by Sakura Kasuga. She is depicted as a lazy girl who wants to live up to her own expectations to make others happy, but also actively skips classes and training and takes every opportunity she can to slack off and eat. She has a notably strong fondness for okonomiyaki, referencing the JRA running an advertisement in 2014 comparing her real-world counterpart's 2003 victory at the Takarazuka Kinen to an okonomiyaki made from shrimp, squid, Ezo scallop, and opilio crab. Hishi Miracle also has a strong hatred and aversion to swimming and regularly skips pool training but is often forcibly dragged to them by her peers, reflecting her real-world counterpart's poor swimming skills.

== Statistics ==
The following table details all 28 starts of Hishi Miracle's racing career based on official netkeiba and JBIS records.

Date	Distance (Condition)	Race	Class	Course	Odds (Favourite)	Field	Finish	Time	Winning (Losing) Margin	Winner (2nd Place)	Jockey	Ref
2001 – two-year-old season
Aug 11	Turf 1200 m (Firm)	2-Y-O Newcomer	Maiden	Kokura	58.4 (9th)	13	7th	1:13.0	1.1	River Treasure	Koichi Tsunoda	
Aug 25	Turf 1200 m (Firm)	2-Y-O Newcomer	Maiden	Kokura	54.3 (10th)	18	11th	1:12.3	2.0	Meiner Prairie	Koichi Tsunoda	
Sep 8	Turf 1200 m (Good)	2-Y-O Maiden	Maiden	Hanshin	81.2 (9th)	12	8th	1:11.2	1.6	Yamanin Ideal	Koichi Tsunoda	
Sep 23	Turf 1200 m (Firm)	2-Y-O Maiden	Maiden	Hanshin	86.3 (10th)	13	9th	1:12.1	1.3	Setono Akebono	Koichi Tsunoda	
Oct 7	Turf 2000 m (Firm)	2-Y-O Maiden	Maiden	Kyoto	11.4 (6th)	8	5th	2:03.3	1.6	Chitose Success	Koichi Tsunoda	
Oct 21	Turf 1800 m (Firm)	2-Y-O Maiden	Maiden	Kyoto	45.0 (10th)	15	2nd	1:48.8	0.5	Fujiyama Wild	Koichi Tsunoda	
Nov 4	Turf 1800 m (Good)	2-Y-O Maiden	Maiden	Kyoto	5.2 (2nd)	16	3rd	1:49.7	0.3	Namura Thanks	Koichi Tsunoda	
2002 – three-year-old season
Apr 20	Turf 1800 m (Firm)	3-Y-O Maiden	Maiden	Kyoto	18.2 (7th)	18	4th	1:48.5	0.8	Hoshino Sasayaki	Yasuhiko Yasuda	
May 4	Turf 1800 m (Firm)	3-Y-O Maiden	Maiden	Kyoto	5.1 (2nd)	18	6th	1:48.5	0.6	Saffron Blizzard	Yasuhiko Yasuda	
May 26	Turf 2000 m (Firm)	3-Y-O Maiden	Maiden	Chukyo	11.7 (5th)	18	1st	2:00.5	–0.5	(Meisho Nobinobi)	Koichi Tsunoda	
Jun 8	Turf 2000 m (Firm)	Buppuso Tokubetsu	Allowance	Chukyo	3.8 (1st)	15	2nd	2:01.7	0.0	Act Naturally	Koichi Tsunoda	
Jun 22	Turf 2200 m (Firm)	Urafu Tokubetsu	Allowance	Hanshin	6.7 (3rd)	18	1st	2:12.6	–0.8	(Prosome)	Koichi Tsunoda	
Jul 20	Turf 2200 m (Firm)	Sado Tokubetsu	Allowance	Niigata	2.2 (1st)	9	3rd	2:13.2	0.4	Precious Song	Koichi Tsunoda	
Aug 4	Turf 2000 m (Firm)	Toyako Tokubetsu	Allowance	Hakodate	4.3 (2nd)	16	3rd	2:04.5	0.2	Presio	Hirofumi Shii	
Sep 8	Turf 2000 m (Firm)	Nowaki Tokubetsu	Allowance	Hanshin	2.0 (1st)	8	1st	2:02.0	–0.1	(El Way Star)	Koichi Tsunoda	
Sep 22	Turf 2000 m (Firm)	Kobe Shimbun Hai	GII	Hanshin	16.1 (7th)	16	6th	2:00.4	1.3	Symboli Kris S	Koichi Tsunoda	
Oct 20	Turf 3000 m (Firm)	Kikuka-shō	GI	Kyoto	36.6 (10th)	18	1st	3:05.9	–0.0	(Fast Tateyama)	Koichi Tsunoda	
Dec 22	Turf 2500 m (Good)	Arima Kinen	GI	Nakayama	18.5 (5th)	14	11th	2:34.2	1.6	Symboli Kris S	Koichi Tsunoda	
2003 – four-year-old season
Mar 23	Turf 3000 m (Firm)	Hanshin Daishōten	GII	Hanshin	16.1 (5th)	15	12th	3:07.0	1.1	Daitaku Bertram	Koichi Tsunoda	
Apr 6	Turf 2000 m (Firm)	Sankei Ōsaka Hai	GII	Hanshin	28.8 (8th)	15	7th	1:59.6	0.5	Tagano My Bach	Koichi Tsunoda	
May 4	Turf 3200 m (Firm)	Tenno Sho (Spring)	GI	Kyoto	16.1 (7th)	18	1st	3:17.0	–0.1	(Sunrise Jaeger)	Koichi Tsunoda	
Jun 29	Turf 2200 m (Firm)	Takarazuka Kinen	GI	Hanshin	16.3 (6th)	17	1st	2:12.0	–0.0	(Tsurumaru Boy)	Koichi Tsunoda	
Oct 12	Turf 2400 m (Firm)	Kyōto Daishōten	GII	Kyoto	2.5 (2nd)	9	2nd	2:26.8	0.2	Tap Dance City	Koichi Tsunoda	
2004 – five-year-old season
Oct 31	Turf 2000 m (Good)	Tenno Sho (Autumn)	GI	Tokyo	19.8 (10th)	17	16th	2:02.7	3.8	Zenno Rob Roy	Koichi Tsunoda	
Nov 28	Turf 2400 m (Firm)	Japan Cup	GI	Tokyo	25.0 (11th)	16	9th	2:25.6	1.4	Zenno Rob Roy	Koichi Tsunoda	
Dec 26	Turf 2500 m (Firm)	Arima Kinen	GI	Nakayama	13.1 (6th)	15	14th	2:31.3	1.8	Zenno Rob Roy	Koichi Tsunoda	
2005 – six-year-old season
Feb 19	Turf 2200 m (Soft)	Kyōto Kinen	GII	Kyoto	14.8 (5th)	12	3rd	2:16.1	0.4	Narita Century	Koichi Tsunoda	
May 1	Turf 3200 m (Firm)	Tenno Sho (Spring)	GI	Kyoto	6.0 (3rd)	18	16th	3:18.3	1.8	Suzuka Mambo	Koichi Tsunoda	

== Pedigree ==
Pedigree of Hishi Miracle (JPN)
Sire Soccer Boy (JPN) 1985	Dictus (FR); 1967	Sanctus	Fine Top
Sire Soccer Boy (JPN) 1985	Dictus (FR); 1967	Sanctus	Sanelta
Sire Soccer Boy (JPN) 1985	Dictus (FR); 1967	Doronic	Worden
Sire Soccer Boy (JPN) 1985	Dictus (FR); 1967	Doronic	Dulzetta
Sire Soccer Boy (JPN) 1985	Dyna Sash (JPN); 1979	Northern Taste	Northern Dancer
Sire Soccer Boy (JPN) 1985	Dyna Sash (JPN); 1979	Northern Taste	Lady Victoria
Sire Soccer Boy (JPN) 1985	Dyna Sash (JPN); 1979	Royal Sash	Princely Gift
Sire Soccer Boy (JPN) 1985	Dyna Sash (JPN); 1979	Royal Sash	Sash of Honour
Dam Shunsaku Yoshiko (JPN) 1992	Shady Heights (GB); 1984	Shirley Heights	Mill Reef
Dam Shunsaku Yoshiko (JPN) 1992	Shady Heights (GB); 1984	Shirley Heights	Hardiemma
Dam Shunsaku Yoshiko (JPN) 1992	Shady Heights (GB); 1984	Vaguely	Bold Lad
Dam Shunsaku Yoshiko (JPN) 1992	Shady Heights (GB); 1984	Vaguely	Vaguely Mine
Dam Shunsaku Yoshiko (JPN) 1992	Shunsaku Lady (JPN); 1979	Lanark	Grey Sovereign
Dam Shunsaku Yoshiko (JPN) 1992	Shunsaku Lady (JPN); 1979	Lanark	Vermillion O'Toole
Dam Shunsaku Yoshiko (JPN) 1992	Shunsaku Lady (JPN); 1979	Moon Phoenix	Fidalgo
Dam Shunsaku Yoshiko (JPN) 1992	Shunsaku Lady (JPN); 1979	Moon Phoenix	Michiasa

- Hishi Miracle is inbred 5 × 5 to Nasrullah.

== See also ==
- Thoroughbred racing in Japan
- Kikuka Sho
- Takarazuka Kinen
