= Soccer Boy (horse) =

Japanese Thoroughbred racehorse (1985–2011)

Soccer Boy サッカーボーイ
- Soccer Boy racing at the 1988 Arima Kinen.
- Breed: Thoroughbred
- Sire: Dictus
- Grandsire: Sanctus
- Dam: Dyna Sash
- Damsire: Northern Taste
- Sex: Stallion
- Foaled: 28 April 1985
- Died: 7 October 2011 (aged 26)
- Country: Japan
- Colour: Flaxen Chestnut
- Breeder: Shadai Farm
- Owner: Shadai Race Horse
- Racing colors
- Trainer: Koji Ono
- Jockey: Masahiro Uchiyama; Hiroshi Kawachi
- Record: 11: 6-0-2
- Earnings: ¥219,932,400

Major wins
- Hanshin Sansai Stakes (1987); Chunichi Sports Yonsai Stakes (1988); Hakodate Kinen (1988); Mile Championship (1988)

Awards
- JRA Award for Best Two-Year-Old Colt (1987); JRA Award for Best Sprinter or Miler (1988)

Soccer Boy (Japanese: サッカーボーイ, Hepburn: Sakkā Bōi; 28 April 1985 – 7 October 2011) was a Japanese Thoroughbred racehorse and sire. In a career plagued by injuries, he competed from 1987 to 1988, recording six wins in eleven starts, including the Mile Championship in 1988 and the Hanshin Sansai Stakes in 1987. He received the JRA Award for Best Two-Year-Old Colt in 1987 and the JRA Award for Best Sprinter or Miler in 1988.

== Background ==
Soccer Boy was a chestnut horse bred in Shiraoi, Hokkaido, by Shadai Farm (Now known as Shiraoi Farm). He was sired by Dictus, a French-bred stallion, and his dam was Dyna Sash, a daughter of Northern Taste and Royal Sash, making him related to Stay Gold, Shonan Pandora and Snow Dragon. He was owned by Shadai Race Horse and sent into training with Koji Ono at the JRA's Ritto Training Center.

== Racing career ==
=== 1987: Two-year-old season ===
Soccer Boy debuted on 9 August 1987, in a maiden race on the turf at Hakodate Racecourse, winning by a margin of 1.5 seconds before the second place Tosho Mario. He subsequently finished fourth in the Hakodate Sansai Stakes (GIII) on September 27. After his first loss by Dictar Land, he won the Momiji Stakes (Open) at Kyoto Racecourse on October 31.

He was initially scheduled to run the 1987 Daily Hai Sansai Stakes but skipped due to an injury caused while training.

On December 20, he contested the Hanshin Sansai Stakes (GI) at Hanshin Racecourse. Ridden by Masahiro Uchiyama, he won the 1600-meter race by 1.3 seconds, setting a new track record of 1:34.5 on a firm track. Following this victory, he was named the 1987 JRA Award for Best Two-Year-Old Colt (the designation for the top two-year-old under the Japanese age system at the time).

=== 1988: Three-year-old season ===
Soccer Boy began his 1988 campaign on 6 March in the Yayoi Sho (GII) at Tokyo Racecourse, finishing third behind Sakura Chiyono O. During the Yayoi Sho,a rock got inside of his hoof,causing him to be sick. He was then subjected to large doses of antibiotics but got even worse and was forced to skip the Satsuki Sho because of this. He subsequently finished fourth in the NHK Hai (GII) and ran an uncharacteristic fifteenth place in the Tokyo Yushun (Japanese Derby, GI),despite being the favorite in the race.

On July 3, he won the Chunichi Sports Yonsai Stakes (GIII) at Chukyo Racecourse, defeating Yaeno Muteki. On August 21, he contested the Hakodate Kinen (GIII) at Hakodate for the first time in his career against older horses. He won the 2000-meter race by 0.8 seconds, setting a new track record of 1:57.8 on a firm track. His race and racecourse record held for 37 years, and were only broken recently by Veloce Era by 0.2 seconds in the 2025 Hakodate Kinen.

In the autumn, Soccer Boy was scheduled to run the Kikuka Sho but skipped due to another injury. He then entered the Mile Championship (GI) at Kyoto on 20 November. Ridden by Hiroshi Kawachi, he won the race by 0.7 seconds over Hokuto Helios. He made his final start in the Arima Kinen (GI) at Nakayama Racecourse on December 25, finishing third behind Oguri Cap and Tamamo Cross .He was initially in fourth place but due to an inquiry disqualifying Super Creek for bumping against Mejiro Durren, his position was increased to third.

Following the Arima Kinen, he was named the 1988 JRA Award for Best Sprinter or Miler.

=== 1989: Four-year-old season ===
Soccer Boy was scheduled to return in 1989 but suffered a fracture and subsequent hoof issues. He was officially retired from racing without making a start that year.

== Statistics ==
The following table details all 11 starts of Soccer Boy's racing career based on official netkeiba and JBIS records.

| Date | Distance (Condition) | Race | Class | Course | Odds (Favourite) | Field | Finish | Time | Winning (Losing) Margin | Winner (2nd Place) | Jockey | Ref |
|---|---|---|---|---|---|---|---|---|---|---|---|---|
1987 – two-year-old season
| Aug 9 | Turf 1200 m (Heavy) | 2-Y-O Newcomer | Maiden | Hakodate | 2.2 (1st) | 7 | 1st | 1:14.5 | –1.5 | (Tosho Mario) | Masahiro Uchiyama | |
| Sep 27 | Turf 1200 m (Soft) | Hakodate Sansai Stakes | GIII | Hakodate | 6.2 (3rd) | 12 | 4th | 1:12.9 | 0.7 | Dictar Land | Masahiro Uchiyama | |
| Oct 31 | Turf 1600 m (Soft) | Momiji Stakes | Open | Kyoto | 2.3 (1st) | 9 | 1st | 1:36.4 | –1.6 | (Rugger Black) | Masahiro Uchiyama | |
| Dec 20 | Turf 1600 m (Firm) | Hanshin Sansai Stakes | GI | Hanshin | 1.9 (1st) | 10 | 1st | R1:34.5 | –1.3 | (Daitaku Longchamp) | Masahiro Uchiyama | |
1988 – three-year-old season
| Mar 6 | Turf 2000 m (Firm) | Yayoi Sho | GII | Tokyo | 1.6 (1st) | 11 | 3rd | 2:01.5 | 0.4 | Sakura Chiyono O | Masahiro Uchiyama | |
| May 8 | Turf 2000 m (Good) | NHK Hai | GII | Tokyo | 3.5 (1st) | 16 | 4th | 2:02.4 | 0.4 | Meiner Glauben | Hiroshi Kawachi | |
| May 29 | Turf 2400 m (Firm) | Tokyo Yushun | GI | Tokyo | 5.8 (1st) | 24 | 15th | 2:28.0 | 1.7 | Sakura Chiyono O | Hiroshi Kawachi | |
| Jul 3 | Turf 1800 m (Firm) | Chunichi Sports Yonsai Stakes | GIII | Chukyo | 3.4 (2nd) | 11 | 1st | 1:48.9 | –0.1 | (Yaeno Muteki) | Hiroshi Kawachi | |
| Aug 21 | Turf 2000 m (Firm) | Hakodate Kinen | GIII | Hakodate | 2.2 (1st) | 14 | 1st | R1:57.8 | –0.8 | (Merry Nice) | Hiroshi Kawachi | |
| Nov 20 | Turf 1600 m (Firm) | Mile Championship | GI | Kyoto | 2.2 (1st) | 17 | 1st | 1:35.3 | –0.7 | (Hokuto Helios) | Hiroshi Kawachi | |
| Dec 25 | Turf 2500 m (Firm) | Arima Kinen | GI | Nakayama | 4.8 (3rd) | 13 | 3rd | 2:34.3 | 0.4 | Oguri Cap | Hiroshi Kawachi | |

- R indicates a track record.

== In popular culture ==
Soccer Boy serves as the model for the character Dicta Striker in the manga and anime series Umamusume Cinderella Grey, a spin-off of the Umamusume: Pretty Derby franchise. The character's name references Soccer Boy's sire, Dictus, and incorporates a "striker" motif reflecting the horse's name. In the anime adaptation, Dicta Striker is voiced by Yumiri Hanamori.

== Stud career ==
Soccer Boy's descendants include:

c = colt, f = filly
bold = grade 1 stakes (GI/JpnI)

| Foaled | Name | Sex | Major wins |
|---|---|---|---|
| 1991 | Kyoto City | c | Winter Stakes, Nagoya Daishoten, Seaside Stakes, **Tokyo Daishoten**, Urawa Kinen, Hakusan Daishoten (2x) |
| 1991 | Go Go Z | c | Copa Republica Argentina, Nikkei Shinshun Hai, Chunichi Shimbun Hai |
| 1996 | Narita Top Road | c | **Kikuka Sho**, Yayoi Sho, Kisaragi Sho, Hanshin Daishoten, Kyoto Kinen, Kyoto Daishoten |
| 1997 | Tico Tico Tac | f | **Shuka Sho** |
| 1998 | Super Gene | c | Niigata Kinen |
| 1999 | Hishi Miracle | c | **Kikuka Sho, Tenno Sho (Spring), Takarazuka Kinen** |
| 2000 | Blue Eleven | c | Tokyo Sports Hai Nisai Stakes, Sekiya Kinen |
| 2000 | Eye Popper | c | Stayers Stakes, Hanshin Daishoten |

== Pedigree ==
Pedigree of Soccer Boy (JPN)
| Sire Dictus (FR) 1967 | Sanctus (FR); 1960 | Fine Top | Fine Art |
| Sire Dictus (FR) 1967 | Sanctus (FR); 1960 | Fine Top | Toupie |
| Sire Dictus (FR) 1967 | Sanctus (FR); 1960 | Sanelta | Tourment |
| Sire Dictus (FR) 1967 | Sanctus (FR); 1960 | Sanelta | Saranella |
| Sire Dictus (FR) 1967 | Doronic (FR); 1960 | Worden | Wild Risk |
| Sire Dictus (FR) 1967 | Doronic (FR); 1960 | Worden | Sans Tares |
| Sire Dictus (FR) 1967 | Doronic (FR); 1960 | Dulzetta | Bozzetto |
| Sire Dictus (FR) 1967 | Doronic (FR); 1960 | Dulzetta | Dulcimer |
| Dam Dyna Sash (JPN) 1979 | Northern Taste (CAN); 1971 | Northern Dancer | Nearctic |
| Dam Dyna Sash (JPN) 1979 | Northern Taste (CAN); 1971 | Northern Dancer | Natalma |
| Dam Dyna Sash (JPN) 1979 | Northern Taste (CAN); 1971 | Lady Victoria | Victoria Park |
| Dam Dyna Sash (JPN) 1979 | Northern Taste (CAN); 1971 | Lady Victoria | Lady Angela |
| Dam Dyna Sash (JPN) 1979 | Royal Sash (GB); 1966 | Princely Gift | Nasrullah |
| Dam Dyna Sash (JPN) 1979 | Royal Sash (GB); 1966 | Princely Gift | Blue Gem |
| Dam Dyna Sash (JPN) 1979 | Royal Sash (GB); 1966 | Sash of Honour | Prince Chevalier |
| Dam Dyna Sash (JPN) 1979 | Royal Sash (GB); 1966 | Sash of Honour | Sylko |

- Soccer Boy was inbred 4 × 5 to Lady Angela and 5 × 5 × 5 to Nearco.

== See also ==
- Thoroughbred racing in Japan
- Mile Championship
