= 2002 Prix de l'Arc de Triomphe =

- Location: Longchamp Racecourse
- Date: October 6, 2002
- Winning horse: Marienbard

The 2002 Prix de l'Arc de Triomphe was a horse race held at Longchamp on Sunday 6 October 2002. It was the 81st running of the Prix de l'Arc de Triomphe.

The winner was Marienbard, a five-year-old horse trained in Great Britain by Saeed bin Suroor. The winning jockey was Frankie Dettori.

== Race details ==
- Sponsor: Groupe Lucien Barrière
- Purse: €1,600,000; First prize: €914,240
- Going: Good
- Distance: 2,400 metres
- Number of runners: 16
- Winner's time: 2m 26.7s

== Full result ==
Pos.	Marg.	Horse	Age	Jockey	Trainer (Country)
1		Marienbard	5	Frankie Dettori	Saeed bin Suroor (UAE)
2	¾	Sulamani	3	Thierry Thulliez	Pascal Bary (FR)
3	½	High Chaparral	3	Michael Kinane	Aidan O'Brien (IRE)
4	½	Califet	4	Thierry Jarnet	Guy Cherel (FR)
5	snk	Islington	3	Kieren Fallon	Sir Michael Stoute (GB)
6	¾	Aquarelliste	4	Dominique Boeuf	Élie Lellouche (FR)
7	1½	Anabaa Blue	4	Christophe Soumillon	Carlos Lerner (FR)
8	1½	Fair Mix	4	Stéphane Pasquier	Marcel Rolland (FR)
9	shd	Falbrav	4	Olivier Peslier	Luciano d'Auria (ITY)
10	1½	Black Sam Bellamy	3	Johnny Murtagh	Aidan O'Brien (IRE)
11	1½	Ana Marie	3	Davy Bonilla	Philippe Demercastel (FR)
12	5	Foundation Spirit	4	Gérald Mossé	François Doumen (FR)
13	5	Manhattan Cafe	4	Masayoshi Ebina	Futoshi Kojima (JPN)
14	2½	Asian Heights	4	Darryll Holland	Geoff Wragg (GB)
15	shd	Boreal	4	Andreas Suborics	Peter Schiergen (GER)
16	20	Sensible	4	Christophe Lemaire	Pascal Bary (FR)

- Abbreviations: shd = short-head; snk = short-neck

== Winner's details ==
Further details of the winner, Marienbard.

- Sex: Horse
- Foaled: 26 May 1997
- Country: Ireland
- Sire: Caerleon; Dam: Marienbad (Darshaan)
- Owner: Godolphin
- Breeder: Saif Ali
