= Red Desire =

Japanese thoroughbred racehorse

Red Desire レッドディザイア
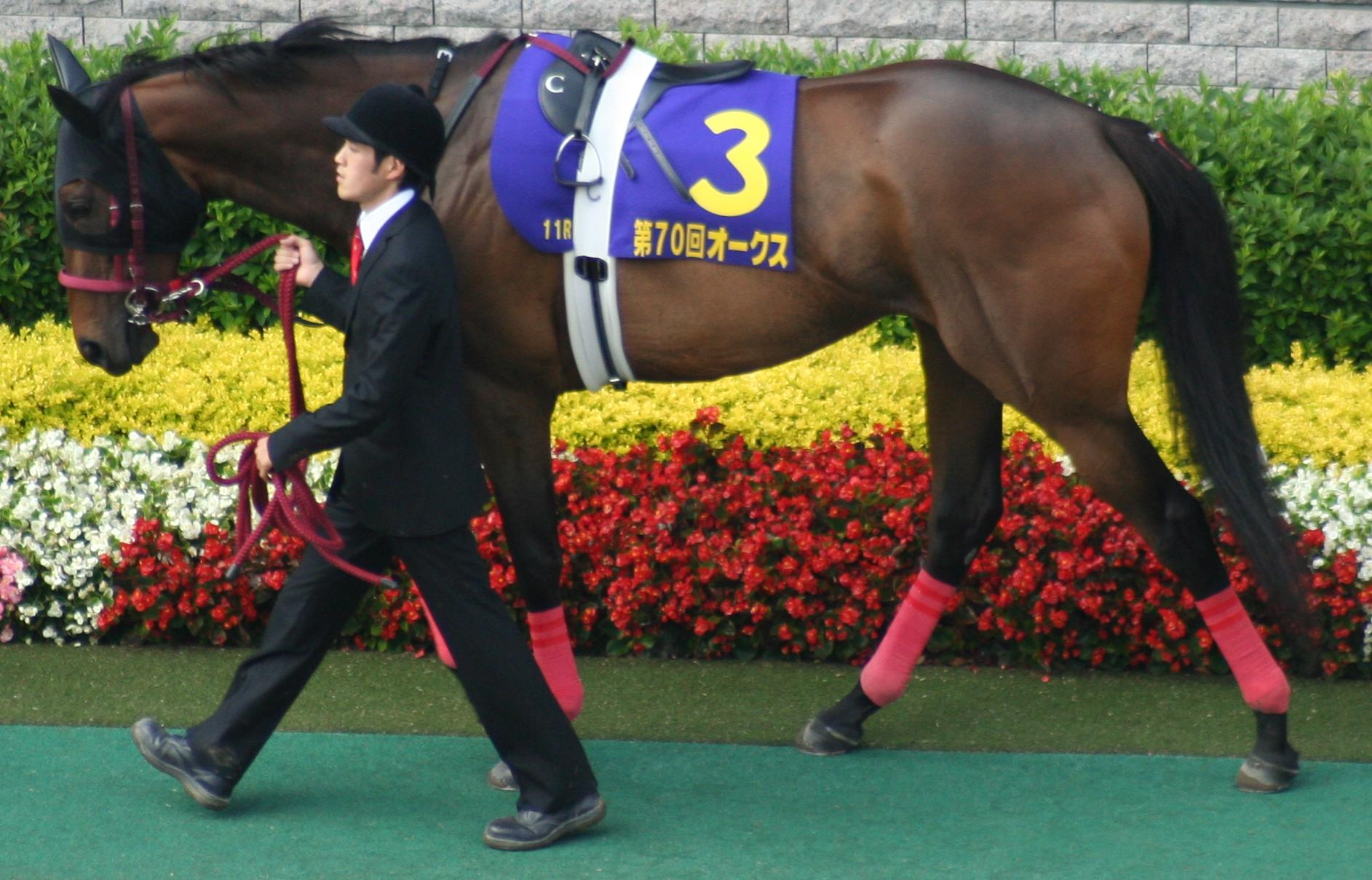
- Red Desire at Tokyo Racecourse in 2009
- Breed: Thoroughbred
- Sire: Manhattan Cafe
- Grandsire: Sunday Silence
- Dam: Great Sunrise
- Damsire: Caerleon
- Sex: Mare
- Foaled: April 19, 2006
- Died: May 20, 2016 (aged 10)
- Country: Japan
- Colour: Bay
- Breeder: Shadai Farm
- Owner: Tokyo Horse Racing Co. Ltd.
- Racing colours
- Trainer: Mikio Matsunaga
- Jockey: Hirofumi Shii
- Record: 14: 4-3-3
- Earnings: ¥360,468,800; JPN: ¥328,116,000; UAE: $360,000 United States dollars USA: $160,000 USD

Major wins
- Al Maktoum Challenge (2010); Japanese Classic Tiara Race wins: Shuka Sho (2009)

Red Desire (Japanese: レッドディザイア, Hepburn: Reddo Dizaia; 19 April 2006 – 20 May 2016) was a Japanese Thoroughbred racehorse and broodmare. She won the Shuka Sho in 2009 and also the Al Maktoum Challenge in 2010. She famously finished second in both the 2009 Oka Sho and the Yushun Himba behind 2010 Japanese Horse of the Year Buena Vista. She retired in 2011 with four wins in 14 races and gave birth to four foals. She died in 2016 due to peritonitis after giving birth to her final foal.

== Background ==
Red Desire was sired by 2001 Kikuka Sho winner Manhattan Cafe and foaled out of Great Sunrise who only won one race out of seven starts before becoming a broodmare. Tokyo Horse Racing Co. Ltd offered sixty thousand yen per 200 shares (equalling to 12 million yen) to became the owner of Red Desire.

The owner believed that Red Desire might emulate her father's prominence in long-distance races. During training, Red Desire had a fall and suffered colic in September which delayed her debut until the next year.

== Racing career ==
=== 2009: three-year-old season ===
Red Desire made her debut in a 1800m race at Kyoto Racecourse on January 4, in which she won the race by a nose. She went on to compete in Elfin Stakes, where she took over Wide Sapphire just before the finishing line to win by a nose for a second time.

With two wins in hand, Red Desire aimed straight for the Oka Sho. She started in the rear of the pack and successfully broke away in the straight, but was overtaken by Buena Vista, who was further to the outside, finishing second by half a length. She went on to compete in the Yushun Himba in May. She ran in the middle of the pack, took the inside at the fourth corner, and broke through the pack in the straight to take the lead, but was in a close race with Buena Vista, who was catching up from behind, and finished in second by a nose.

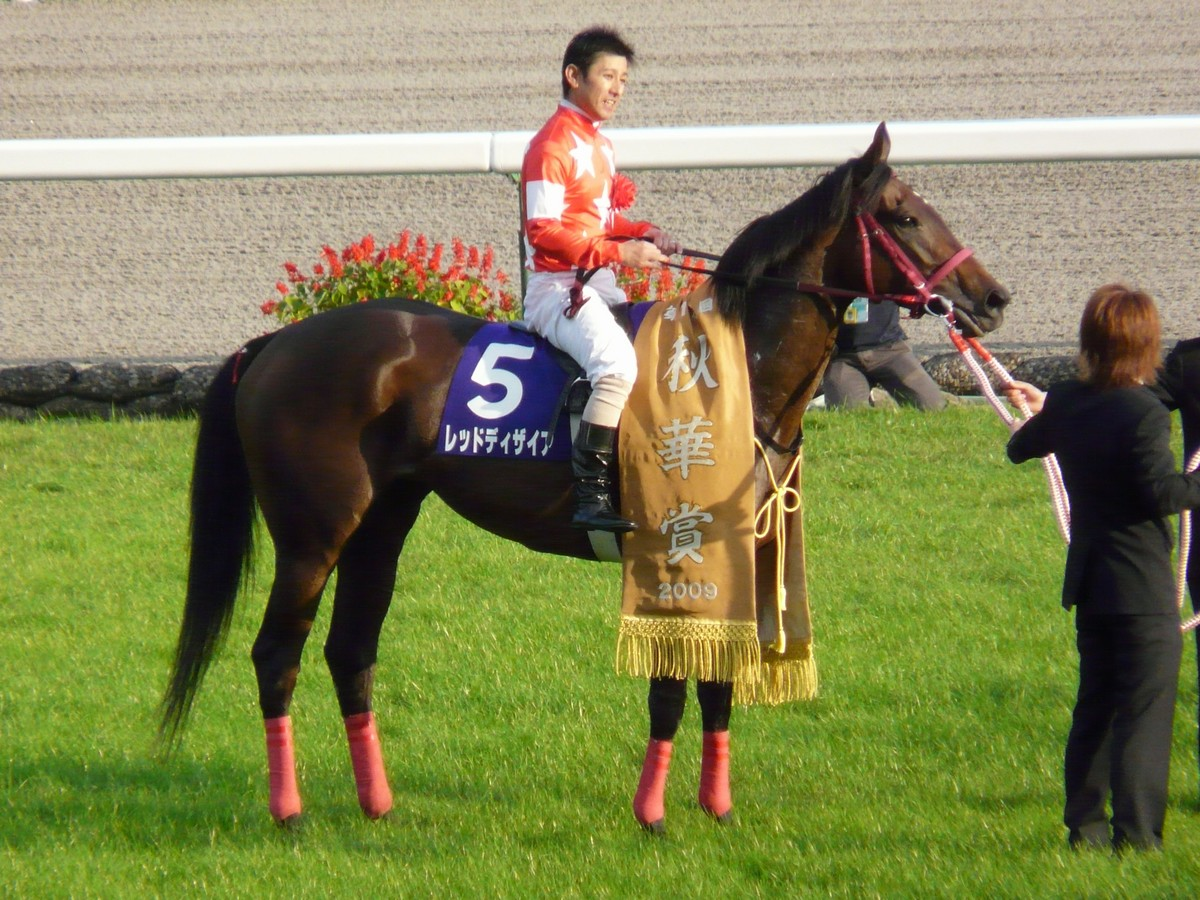
Red Desire after winning Shuka Sho in 2009

After having a good rest before the autumn starts, Red Desire ran in the Rose Stakes in September. She came as a favourite and started well mainly positioned at the back. She made a push in third corner but it was too late as Broad Street already capitalized her early escape and took the win. With three straight second-place finishes, her luck changed in her next race which is the Shuka Sho. During the race, she took the lead around the fourth corner and held off the fiercely pursuing Buena Vista by a nose to win. Buena Vista herself was demoted to third due to interference.

Red Desire withdrew from Queen Elizabeth II Cup due to injury and joined the Japan Cup in November. Even as a three year old, she managed to keep up with the pace and made a final rush to finish third behind Vodka and Oken Bruce Lee.

=== 2010: four-year-old season ===
The first race she joined in this year was Al Maktoum Challenge in Dubai. Ridden by Olivier Peslier, she chased from behind and then made a strong move from the outside to catch a Brazilian racehorse, Glória de Campeão, who was trying to break away in the straight and won by a neck. This win qualified her as a participant on the Dubai World Cup. In the upcoming Dubai World Cup, she was paired with Christophe Soumillon, but was unable to show the same powerful legs as in her previous race and finished 11th, which won by the one who she beat before (Glória de Campeão).

After returning to Japan, She raced in the Victoria Mile which set up another showdown with her rival, Buena Vista. Started the race well, running on the outside of the middle pack and making a move in the straight, but was overtaken by Buena Vista in the final stretch. She was unable to extend her lead and finished fourth. Red Desire was voted for the Takarazuka Kinen but was forced to rest after a nosebleed during one workout in June.

In fall, She travelled to the United States and joined the Flower Bowl Stakes as a preparatory race for competing in the Breeders' Cup Filly & Mare Turf. The Flower Bowl Stakes was held on soft turf due to raining and strong winds, which prevented Red Desire from preparing to her full potential. Despite the extremely slow pace, she ran in third or fourth place on the inside throughout the race. She took the lead from the inside in the final straight, but was overtaken by Ave and finished third. In the Breeders' Cup Filly & Mare Turf on November 5, she held on in a good position, saving her energy, and made an early spurt at the fourth corner, but she struggled to extend her lead in the straight in which Shared Account and Midday surpassed her and she finished fourth. She returned to Japan and raced in the Arima Kinen in which she finished in 14th place.

=== 2011: five-year-old season ===
She started the year with the Sapporo Kinen. Red Desire positioned well on third place and started her spurt later on but failed to improve which she ended up with third place. Red Desire was registered for the Tenno Sho (Autumn) but fail to qualify and switched her focus on the Queen Elizabeth II Cup. Unfortunately, due to repeatedly suffering from nosebleeds during workouts, her owner decided to retire her from racing and entered her for breeding career.

== Breeding career ==
Red Desire was not considered a successful broodmare. She only managed to foal four progenies, none of which managed to win a graded race. During the final foaling, Red Desire developed peritonitis and died soon after.

c = colt, f = filly

No.	Name	Foaled	Sex	Color	Sire	Wins	Races	Remarks
1st	Red Diver	2013	f	Bay	Harbinger	0	4	Deceased
2nd	Big Desire	2014	c	Bay	King Kamehameha	1	4	Deceased
3rd	Nostalgia	2015	f	Dark Bay	Novellist			Did not race, broodmare
4th	(Red Desire 2016)	2016	f	Bay	King Kamehameha			

== In popular culture ==
An anthropomorphized version of Red Desire appears in the Japanese multimedia franchise Umamusume: Pretty Derby, voiced by Hitomi Sekine. She is depicted as an avid reader of isekai novels to the point of believing herself to be a reincarnated saintess whose goal is to overcome the trials of the current world to reach the next one. She admires Manhattan Cafe and Vodka, the former her senior and whose coffee she enjoys drinking together with, and the latter she idolizes with photos and posters of her as personal possessions, though it is not entirely one-sided as Vodka has a friendly relationship with her.

== Racing form ==
Red Desire raced in 14 races in which she won 4 races (including 1 Group 1 win), finished second in 3 races, and third place in 3 races. This data available is based on JBIS search, netkeiba.com, equibase.com, and racingpost.com. The races are considered all weather.

Date	Age	Racecourse	Race	Grade	Distance (condition)	Entry	HN	Odds (Favored)	Finish	Time	Margins	Jockey	Winner (Runner-up)
Jan 4, 2009	3	Kyoto	3YO Debut		1,800 m (Firm)	13	13	3.4 (1)	1st	1:48.9	0.0	Hirofumi Shii	(Satono Emblem)
Feb 7, 2009	3	Kyoto	Elfin Stakes	OP	1,600 m (Firm)	12	2	2.2 (1)	1st	1:36.0	0.0	Hirofumi Shii	(Wide Sapphire)
Apr 12, 2009	3	Hanshin	Oka Sho	1	1,600 m (Firm)	18	18	14.4 (2)	2nd	1:34.1	0.1	Hirofumi Shii	Buena Vista
May 24, 2009	3	Tokyo	Yushun Himba	1	2,400 m (Firm)	17	3	6.0 (2)	2nd	2:26.1	0.0	Hirofumi Shii	Buena Vista
Sep 20, 2009	3	Hanshin	Rose Stakes	2	1,800 m (Firm)	18	11	1.4 (1)	2nd	1:44.7	0.0	Hirofumi Shii	Broad Street
Oct 18, 2009	3	Kyoto	Shuka Sho	1	2,000 m (Firm)	18	5	3.2 (2)	1st	1:58.2	–0.2	Hirofumi Shii	(Broad Street)
Nov 29, 2009	3	Tokyo	Japan Cup	1	2,400 m (Firm)	18	6	9.6 (6)	3rd	2:22.6	0.2	Hirofumi Shii	Vodka
Mar 4, 2010	4	Meydan	Al Maktoum Challenge	2	2,000 m (Good)	14	13	8/1 (6)	1st	2:02.6	–0.3	Olivier Peslier	(Glória de Campeão)
Mar 27, 2010	4	Meydan	Dubai World Cup	1	2,000 m (Firm)	14	3	6/1 (4)	11th	2:04.5	0.7	Christophe Soumillon	Glória de Campeão
May 16, 2010	4	Tokyo	Victoria Mile	1	1,600 m (Firm)	18	17	5.7 (2)	4th	1:32.5	0.1	Hirofumi Shii	Buena Vista
Oct 3, 2010	4	Belmont	Flower Bowl Stakes	1	1 1/4 miles (Good)	8	2	1.9 (1)	3rd	2:08.7	0.2	Kent Desormeaux	Ave
Nov 5, 2010	4	Churchill	Breeders' Cup Filly & Mare Turf	1	1 3/8 miles (Firm)	11	10	5.1 (3)	4th	2:18.0	0.3	Kent Desormeaux	Shared Account
Dec 26, 2010	4	Nakayama	Arima Kinen	1	2,500 m (Firm)	15	15	47.2 (11)	14th	2:34.0	1.4	Hirofumi Shii	Victoire Pisa
Aug 21, 2011	5	Sapporo	Sapporo Kinen	2	2,000 m (Firm)	13	8	6.2 (2)	3rd	2:00.5	0.1	Hirofumi Shii	Tosen Jordan

Legend:
Turf Dirt

== Pedigree ==
Pedigree of Red Desire (JPN), bay mare, 2006
Sire Manhattan Cafe (JPN) 1998	Sunday Silence (USA); 1986	Halo	Hail to Reason
Sire Manhattan Cafe (JPN) 1998	Sunday Silence (USA); 1986	Halo	Cosmah
Sire Manhattan Cafe (JPN) 1998	Sunday Silence (USA); 1986	Wishing Well	Understanding
Sire Manhattan Cafe (JPN) 1998	Sunday Silence (USA); 1986	Wishing Well	Mountain Flower
Sire Manhattan Cafe (JPN) 1998	Subtle Change (IRE); 1988	Law Society	Alleged
Sire Manhattan Cafe (JPN) 1998	Subtle Change (IRE); 1988	Law Society	Bold Bikini
Sire Manhattan Cafe (JPN) 1998	Subtle Change (IRE); 1988	Santa Luciana	Luciano
Sire Manhattan Cafe (JPN) 1998	Subtle Change (IRE); 1988	Santa Luciana	Suleika
Dam Great Sunrise (GB) 1998 FNo: 16-b	Caerleon (USA); 1980	Nijinsky II	Northern Dancer
Dam Great Sunrise (GB) 1998 FNo: 16-b	Caerleon (USA); 1980	Nijinsky II	Flaming Page
Dam Great Sunrise (GB) 1998 FNo: 16-b	Caerleon (USA); 1980	Foreseer	Round Table
Dam Great Sunrise (GB) 1998 FNo: 16-b	Caerleon (USA); 1980	Foreseer	Regal Gleam
Dam Great Sunrise (GB) 1998 FNo: 16-b	Grace and Glory (GB); 1993	Sadler's Wells	Northern Dancer
Dam Great Sunrise (GB) 1998 FNo: 16-b	Grace and Glory (GB); 1993	Sadler's Wells	Fairy Bridge
Dam Great Sunrise (GB) 1998 FNo: 16-b	Grace and Glory (GB); 1993	Grace Note	Top Ville
Dam Great Sunrise (GB) 1998 FNo: 16-b	Grace and Glory (GB); 1993	Grace Note	Val de Grace

- Red Desire is inbred 4 x 4 to Northern Dancer and 4 x 5 to Hail to Reason (Regal Gleam's sire)
