= Falcon Stakes =

Falcon Stakes ファルコンステークス
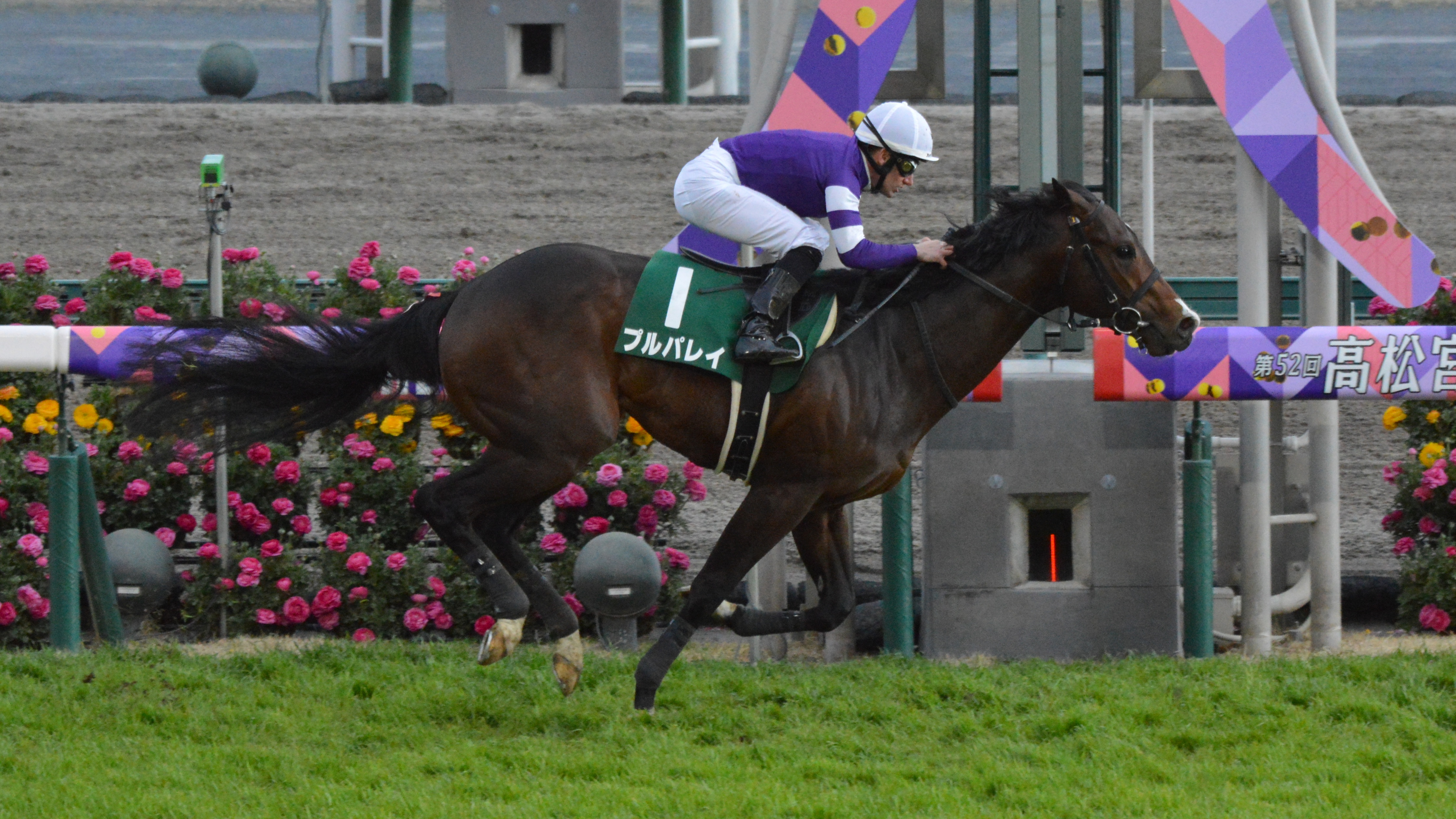
- Purpur Ray winning the 2022 Falcon Stakes
- Class: Grade 3
- Location: Chukyo Racecourse
- Inaugurated: 1987
- Race type: Thoroughbred Flat racing

Race information
- Distance: 1400 metres
- Surface: Turf
- Track: Left-handed
- Qualification: 3-y-o
- Weight: 57 kg Allowance: Fillies 2 kg
- Purse: ¥ 87,960,000 (as of 2026): 1st: ¥ 41,000,000; 2nd: ¥ 16,000,000; 3rd: ¥ 10,000,000

The Falcon Stakes (ファルコンステークス) is a Grade 3 horse race for three-year-old Thoroughbreds run in March over a distance of 1400 metres at Chukyo Racecourse.

The race was first run in 1987 as the Chunichi Sports Yonsai Stakes (中日スポーツ賞4歳ステークス) and has held Grade 3 status from its inauguration. It was initially run over 1800 before being cut to 1200 metres in 1996 and then extended to 1400 metres in 2012.

The name was changed to the current name in 2001.

== Previous winners ==
Year	Winner	Jockey	Trainer	Owner	Time
1987	Hide Ryu O	Tadashi Kayo	Makoto Osawa	Mitsuyuki Umezawa	1:48.8
1988	Soccer Boy	Hiroshi Kawachi	Koji Ono	Shadai Race Horse	1:48.9
1989	Osaichi George	Katsuhide Maruyama	Kazumi Domon	Choichi Node	1:47.9
1990	Long Arch	Yutaka Take	Akihiko Uda	Nakai Shoji	1:48.5
1991	Kogane Power	Seiki Tabara	Akio Tsurudome	Takao Seto	1:48.5
1992	Kyoei Bowgun	Tatsuya Matsumoto	Akihiko Nomura	Masao Matsuoka	1:48.2
1993	Nehai Caesar	Katsumi Shiomura	Tadashi Fuse	Daimaru Kigyo	1:45.2
1994	Inazuma Takao	Shoichi Osaki	Ryoichi Hisako	Takao Kojima	1:48.7
1995	Ibuki Rajo Mon	Yutaka Take	Masazo Ryoke	Ibuki	1:49.6
1996	Sugino Hayakaze	Hirokazu Tajima	Yukiharu Shikato	Yoshio Sugie	1:08.5
1997	Opening Theme	Takao Koike	Yoshihito Dazai	Koji Maeda	1:09.6
1998	Tokio Perfect	Masayoshi Ebina	Fumio Koga	Tokio Sakata	1:09.9
1999	Saikyo Sunday	Hirohi Kawachi	Masahiro Sakaguchi	Kenichiro Okumoto	1:09.8
2000	Yuwa Falcon	Eiji Nakadate	Masahiro Horii	Yuwa	1:08.9
2001	Rusunai Christie^{a}	Shinichiro Akiyama	Yoshio Takagi	Takaaki Bokujo	1:08.9
2002	Sunningdale	Yuichi Fukunaga	Tsutomu Setoguchi	Shigeki Goto	1:08.9
2003	Gallant Arrow	Hideaki Miyuki	Hiroki Sakiyama	Atsuko Tomizawa	1:09.7
2004	Kyowa Happiness^{a}	Yasuhiko Yasuda	Masaru Sayama	Masahiko Asakawa	1:09.5
2005	Kazusa Line	Eiji Nakadate	Masamichi Wada	Kazumasa Azu	1:09.9
2006	Tagano Bastille	Kenichi Ikezoe	Kaneo Ikezoe	Ryoji Yagi	1:09.9
2007	Admire Hokuto	Norihiro Yokoyama	Fumio Koga	Riichi Kondo	1:08.0
2008	Danon Go Go	Yutaka Take	Kojiro Hashiguchi	Danox	1:09.0
2009	Jo Cappuccino	Kota Fujioka	Kazuya Nakatake	Keiko Ueda	1:08.9
2010	A Shin Whity	Yuichi Kitamura	Shigeki Matsumoto	Eishindo	1:08.7
2011	Henny Hound^{b}	Yasunari Iwata	Yoshito Yahagi	Masamichi Hayashi	1:08.7
2012	Brightline	Katsumi Ando	Ippo Sameshima	North Hills	1:24.0
2013	Impulse Hero	Katsuharu Tanaka	Sakae Kunieda	Kanji Sasaki	1:22.2
2014	Tagano Grandpa	Yuichi Fukunaga	Hiroyoshi Matsuda	Ryoji Yagi	1:21.2
2015	Tagano Azaghal	Daisaku Matsuda	Teruhiko Chida	Ryoji Yagi	1:22.9
2016	Tosho Drafter	Hironobu Tanabe	Koji Kayano	Tosho Sangyo	1:25.0
2017	Kosoku Straight	Keita Tosaki	Eiji Nakadate	Akio Nozaki	1:21.1
2018	Mr Melody	Yuichi Fukunaga	Hideaki Fujiwara	Green Fields	1:22.1
2019	Happy Hour	Hayato Yoshida	Koshiro Take	Yuko Takashima	1:20.9
2020	Shine Garnet	Hironobu Tanabe	Toru Kurita	Koichiro Yamaguchi	1:21.3
2021	Rooks Nest	Hideaki Miyuki	Tamio Hamada	Yoshiro Kubota	1:20.1
2022	Purpur Ray	Mirco Demuro	Naosuke Sugai	G Riviere Racing	1:20.9
2023	Tamamo Black Tie	Hideaki Miyuki	Koichi Tsunoda	Tamamo	1:22.6
2024	Danon McKinley	Yuichi Kitamura	Hideaki Fujiwara	Danon	1:20.2
2025	Yankee Barows	Mirai Iwata	Hiroyuki Uemura	Koji Inokuma	1:21.0
2026	Diamond Knot	Yuga Kawada	Yuichi Fukunaga	Kaneko Makoto Holdings Co., Ltd	1:19.8

^{a} The 2001 winner Rusunai Christie and the 2004 winner Kyowa Happiness were fillies
^{b} The 2011 race was held at Hanshin Racecourse

== See also ==
- Horse racing in Japan
- List of Japanese flat horse races
