= Buena Vista (horse) =

Japanese-bred Thoroughbred racehorse

Buena Vista ブエナビスタ
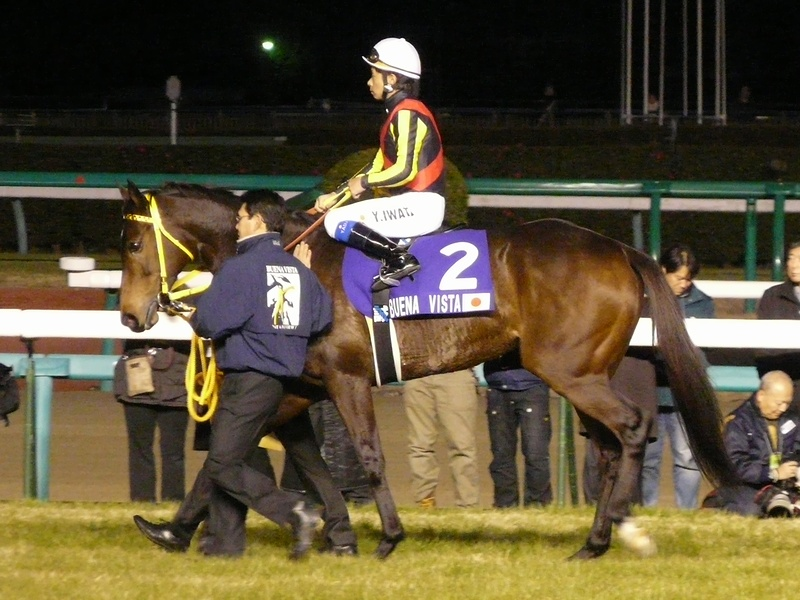
- Buena Vista during her retirement ceremony in 2011.
- Breed: Thoroughbred
- Sire: Special Week (JPN)
- Grandsire: Sunday Silence (USA)
- Dam: Biwa Heidi (JPN)
- Damsire: Caerleon (USA)
- Sex: Mare
- Foaled: March 14, 2006 (age 20)
- Country: Japan
- Colour: Dark bay
- Breeder: Northern Farm
- Owner: Sunday Racing
- Racing colours
- Trainer: Hiroyoshi Matsuda
- Jockey: Katsumi Ando; Norihiro Yokoyama; Christophe Soumillon; Yasunari Iwata
- Record: 23: 9-8-3
- Earnings: ¥1,478,869,700; Japan: ¥1,386,433,000; UAE: US$1,000,000

Major wins
- Hanshin Juvenile Fillies (2008); Tulip Sho (2009); Kyoto Kinen (2010); Victoria Mile (2010); Tenno Sho (Autumn) (2010); Japan Cup (2011); Japanese Classic Tiara Race wins: Oka Sho (2009); Yushun Himba (2009)

Awards
- JRA Award for Best Two-Year-Old Filly (2008); JRA Award for Best Three-Year-Old Filly (2009); JRA Award for Best Older Filly or Mare (2010, 2011); Japanese Horse of the Year (2010)

Buena Vista (Japanese: ブエナビスタ, Hepburn: Buena Bisuta; foaled 14 March 2006) is a retired Japanese Thoroughbred racehorse and broodmare who was the 2010 Japanese Horse of the Year after winning the first two races in the Japanese Fillies Triple Crown.

== Background ==
Buena Vista was foaled on 14 March 2006. She was sired by the 1999 Japan Cup winner, Special Week and out of 1995 Hanshin Juvenile Fillies winner, Biwa Heidi. Buena Vista was owned by Sunday Racing and bred by Northern Farm. She was initially named as "Biwa Heidi 6" before receiving her current racing name Buena Vista, meaning beautiful scenery in Spanish.

== Racing career ==
=== 2008: two-year-old season ===
In her maiden race (1800 m at Kyoto), Buena Vista finished third behind future 2009 Satsuki Sho's winner, Unrivaled. Her jockey, Katsumi Ando commented about Buena Vista - "She was hesitant for a while after the start and she wasn't in the groove yet. I thought she could catch up to the lead even from there". She raced again at the same racecourse over a shorter distance (1600 m) where she started from the back, then overtook the others on the outside of the straight to take the lead, and without Ando's help, she won by three lengths, earning her first victory.

Her final race of the year would be at the Hanshin Juvenile Fillies. She started slowly and worked her way back, then moved to the outside in the straight and made a strong comeback. With 200 meters remaining, she overtook the pack to take the lead, and with 100 meters remaining, Ando was confident of victory and did not urge her on any further. She crossed the finish line two and a half lengths ahead of the rest, winning the GI race. This marked a dam-offspring victory as her dam won the race 13 years prior. This was the first time a horse had won two consecutive races since its first victory, and it was the first time since the race was restricted to fillies. At the end of the year, Buena Vista won the JRA Award for Best Two-Year-Old Filly where 299 out of 300 journalists voted for her.

=== 2009: three-year-old season ===
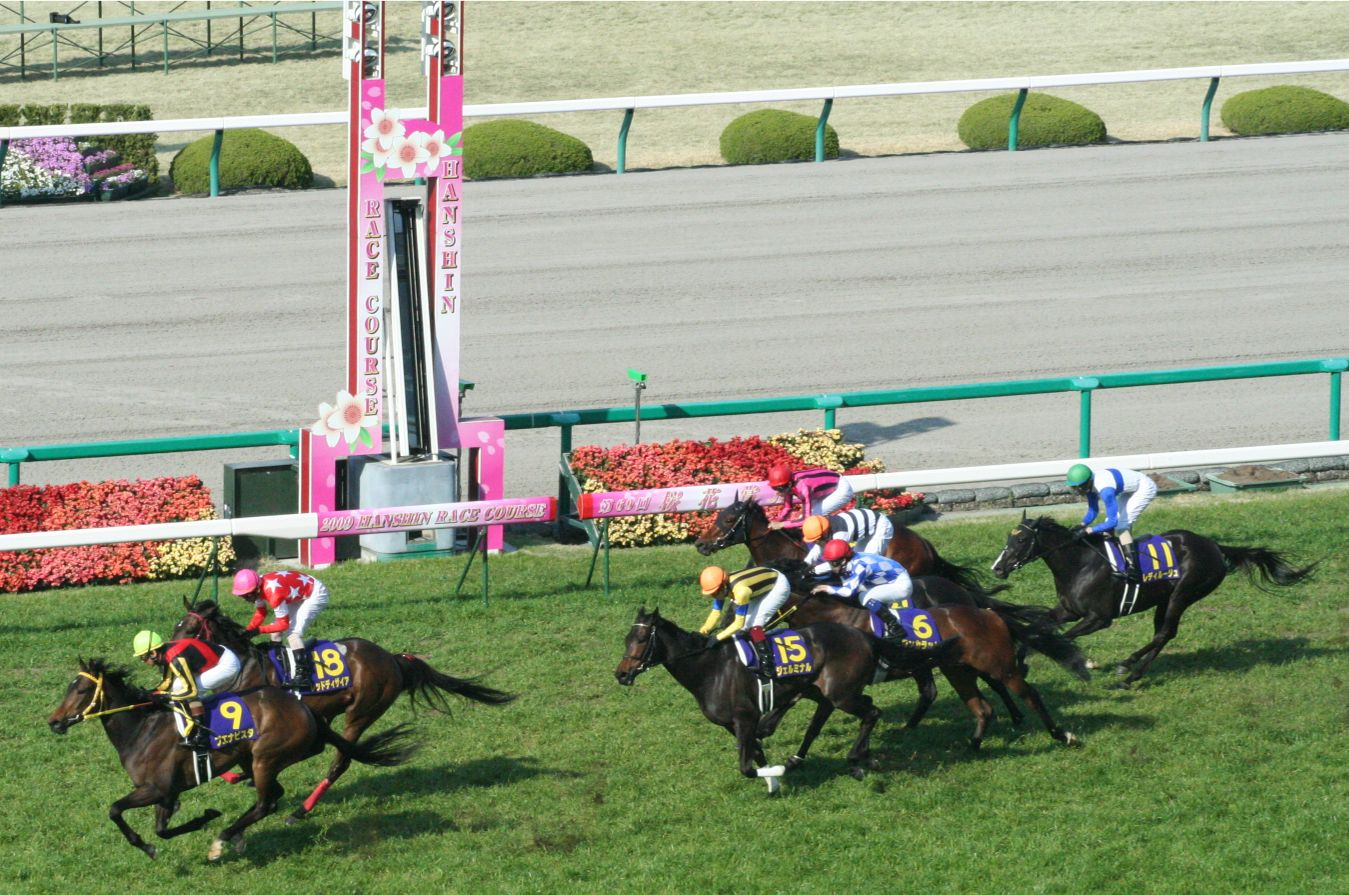
Buena Vista at the Oka Sho

Buena Vista started the year with Tulip Sho. The condition for that day is rainy and she was put on the inside gate for the race. Most of the race, she waited at the back of the pack. In the final 300 meters, Ando began to pursue, he closed the gap and overtook Sakura Mimosa, finishing in first place by one and a quarter lengths. With the strong momentum, she joined the Oka Sho at Hanshin. She was not in good temperament that day but became more composed by the care of her stablehand. As usual, Buena Vista started pretty slow at the beginning but closed the gap at the final corners and surpassed her rival, Red Desire from the outside in the final 100 meters and took the win. On May 24, Buena Vista challenged the Yushun Himba which being held at Tokyo. Without changing anything, Buena Vista stayed mostly at the back of the pack and started to move and speed up on the outside at the final 400 meters. On the other side, Red Desire managed to close up so much at the final straight and the race ended with a photo finish. After the review, The judges gave the win to Buena Vista by a nose.

Sunday Racing and her trainer, Matsuda proposed to go Prix de l'Arc de Triomphe after Buena Vista's fifth win in the row for the year but cancelled immediately after she finished the race in second place at Sapporo Kinen behind Yamanin Kingly. Sapporo Kinen was meant to be the preparation races for the France tour and the defeat there causing the owner to reconsider their decision. The team was concerned that Buena Vista's second-place finish in Sapporo Kinen was not good enough for the Arc. The focus shifted towards an attempt for the triple tiara in Shuka Sho which was held at her debut racecourse, Kyoto. On the race day, Buena Vista got a good start and positioned herself well in the middle pack before chasing Red Desire, who got off early from the outside and both horses reached the line in another photo finish fashion. This time, the winner is Red Desire who was ahead only by a nose. Furthermore, Buena Vista was demoted to third-place finish after she interfered with Broad Street by moving diagonally when the final result was released 17 minutes later.

Buena Vista's luck did not improve much after Shuka Sho. She raced in Queen Elizabeth II Cup where the top 2 finishers of that race, Queen Spumante and T.M. Precure burst early and opened a big gap up to 20 lengths. Buena Vista tried to recover but failed to do so and finished third on the day. Her great performances in the year accumulated almost 100,000 votes by the fans for her to race in Arima Kinen in which she did. She was the second most voted horses to be included but was promoted to first since the most favourite, Vodka was scratched. Due to lack of wins in the last three races, the team switched the jockey from Ando to Norihiro Yokoyama. The race began well for Buena Vista as she sat in sixth position and managed to pass 2007 winner, Matsurida Gogh to take the lead but lost it in the final straight to Dream Journey and finished second half a length behind. Due to her excellent form throughout the year by winning three races and snatching two out of three tiaras, Buena Vista won JRA Award for Best Three-Year-Old Filly with 286 out of 287 votes (she lost one vote to Red Desire).

=== 2010: four-year-old season ===
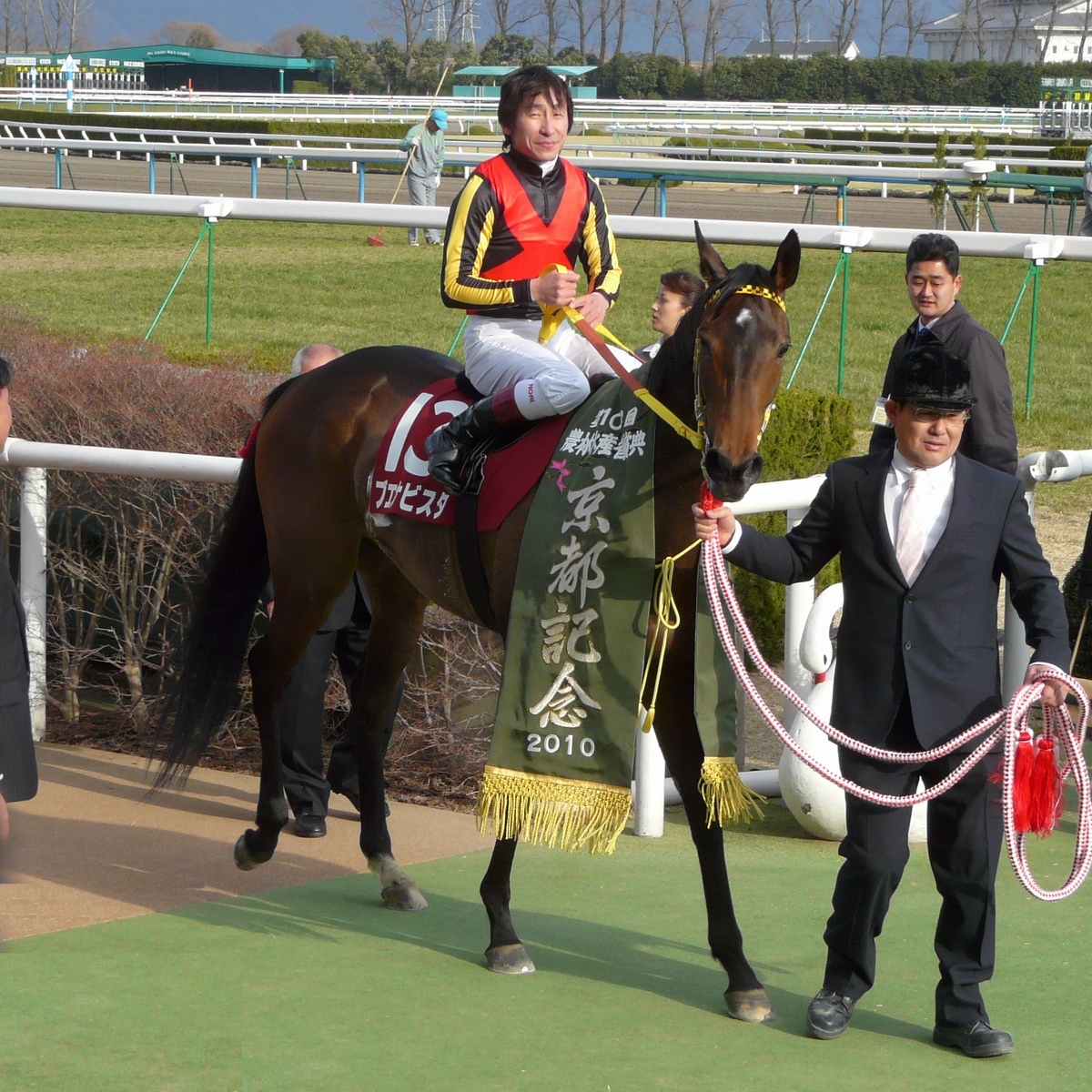
Buena Vista at the 2010 Kyoto Kinen

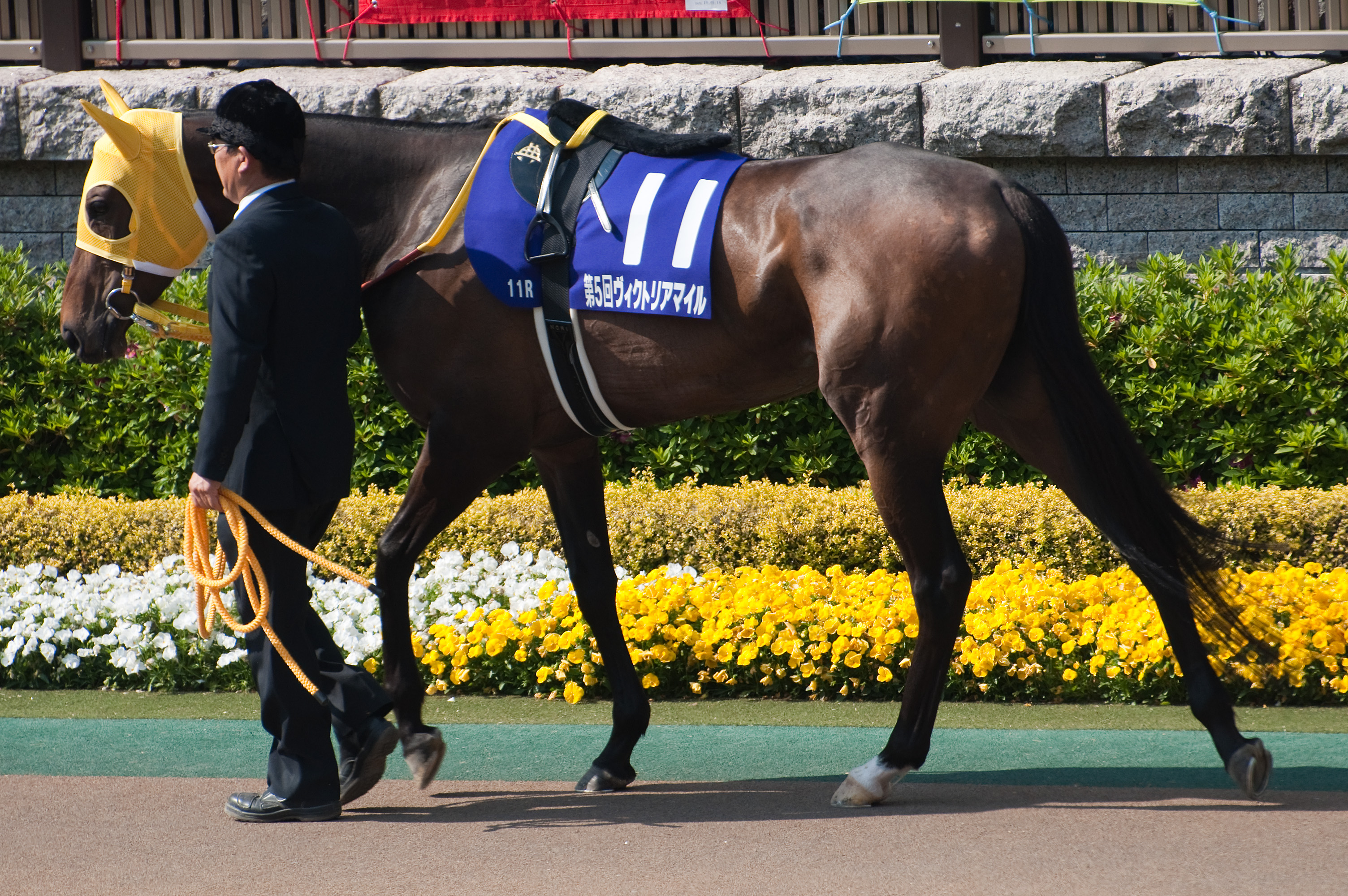
Buena Vista at the parade ring of the 2010 Victoria Mile

In the next year, Buena Vista first race was decided to be in Kyoto Kinen with Yokoyama remaining as her jockey. This race was important since it would be the decider whether the planned Dubai trip would be executed. On the race day, She held off the main contender, Jaguar Mail and claimed her first win since Yushun Himba nine months prior. After winning the race, the invitation was accepted and Buena Vista would be racing in Dubai Sheema Classic. Initially, the chosen jockey was Christophe Soumillon but he declined. Then the task fall onto Olivier Peslier which he accepted. Buena Vista was mainly blocked throughout the race but found an opening on final 100 meters in which she capitalized and finished second, behind Dar Re Mi.

The next race decided for Buena Vista would be Victoria Mile on May 16 in which her fiercest rival, Red Desire also competed in. Back with Yokoyama again, she started late in the race but rapidly caught up with Red Desire on the outside before finally overtook Hikaru Amaranthus for her fourth G1 win in total. In June, Buena Vista gained 92,000 votes in the fan poll for Takarazuka Kinen race which made her the first favourite on the bunch. In similar fashion as previous race, Buena Vista got the right position in the beginning and passed Earnestly to take the lead but failed to maintain the momentum when Nakayama Festa pulled a powerful late burst and beat her by half length to the finish line.

After the summer break ended, Buena Vista started the autumn season with Tenno Sho (Autumn) to boot. Before this race, Yokoyama got an injury on his cervical vertebrae and a fracture in the skull, thus rendering him unable to race. In this condition, Soumillon took over the reins. Different jockey does not affect Buena Vista much as her normal strategy of running late in the middle before spurting was being played as usual. This time, Buena Vista started her sprint in final 300 meters and she won her fifth G1 by ease, with Soumillon stopped pushing near the finishing line. Continuing the good momentum, Sunday Racing stuck with Soumillon for her next race, Japan Cup. Staying back for majority of the race, Buena Vista dashed in the final straight and passed both Victoire Pisa and Rose Kingdom for the first-place finish. 24 minutes later, Buena Vista was demoted to second because she veered to the inside and impeded Rose Kingdom in the final straight. Rose Kingdom was promoted as the official winner of the race and Soumillon was suspended for two weeks.

In the end of the year, Buena Vista being voted again to race in Arima Kinen. Soumillon return for the race with Buena Vista as his suspension ended before the race was held. During the later phase of this race, Buena Vista surged instantly at the end to chase Victoire Pisa in final 200 meters before both horses finished almost at the same time. This race gave a third photo finish in career for Buena Vista. Just like in Shuka Sho previous year, Buena Vista came second. With an excellent form (3 wins and 4 second places), Buena Vista won JRA Award for Best Older Filly or Mare and also getting the most prized award of the year, Japanese Horse of the Year for the 2010 season. For the best filly award, Buena Vista got a unanimous vote from 285 journalists.

=== 2011: five-year-old season ===
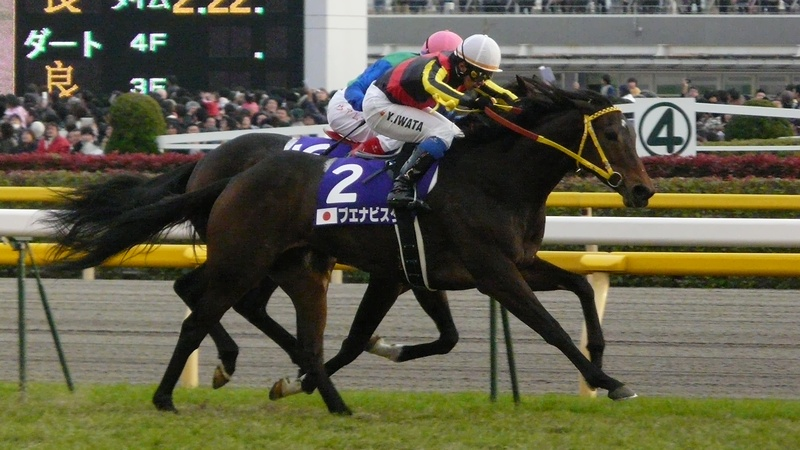
Buena Vista at the 2011 Japan Cup

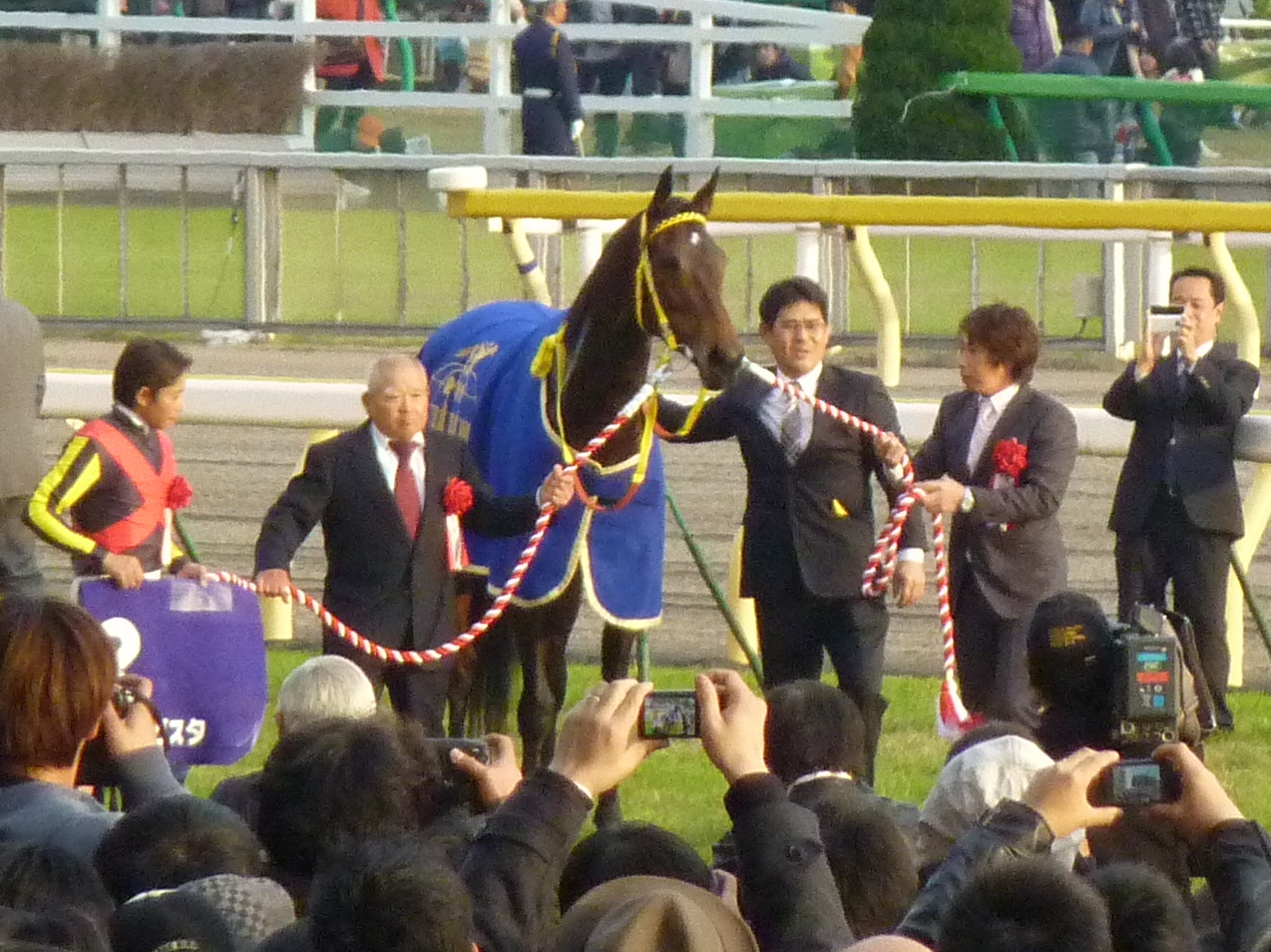
Buena Vista after winning the Japan Cup

Unlike previous years, Buena Vista started the year with an international race with Dubai World Cup in sight. Together with Transcend and Victoire Pisa, The trio went to Dubai with another Japanese horse, Rulership who would be racing in Dubai Sheema Classic. The jockey for this race was Ryan Moore as Soumillon had another commitment. The race was fine in the beginning but due to slow pace throughout the race, Buena Vista timing became off and she failed to show her late chasing pace and finished eighth, which is the first time she finished outside the podium. When she got back to Japan, she initially planned to return at Takarazuka Kinen but her good condition allowed her to defend the title in Victoria Mile. Her jockey this season would be Yasunari Iwata, which will continue the task until the end of the season. As per usual, Buena Vista placing herself at the back and spurting at the end, catching Lady Alba Rosa but failed to overtake previous year triple tiara winner horse, Apapane and finished second.

Buena Vista became the first favourite and most voted horse for Takarazuka Kinen for second successive year with approximately 100,000 votes being polled this time. The bad luck continued as she finished second behind Earnestly by one and a half length behind. Later in the autumn season, Buena Vista failed to defend her Tenno Sho (Autumn) reign where she finished fourth, three-quarters of a length behind the winner, Tosen Jordan. The trainer, Matsuda spoke about her recent declining form - "The horse was a little out of sorts. I think he'll do better next time". The place for the slump to end would be the Japan Cup, where Buena Vista came second last year due to demotion. This year, Buena Vista was second favourite behind a German horse, Danedream. She got off to a good start and moved outside, battled one on one with Tosen Jordan before reached the line first and redeemed her mishap in the previous year. Iwata, Matsuda and her stablehand, Keiji Yamaguchi were in tears after the win and the loud chant of "Iwata!" roaring at the Tokyo Racecourse that day.

Not long after the win, the team decided that Buena Vista last race would be the Arima Kinen. She was the first favourite of the race with 110,000 fans voted for her to win. She started from the inside gate and entered the straightaway in a good position in third place, but showed no signs of accelerating and fell back. She finished seventh, her first time missing the board (the racecourse electronic board) in Japan. The retirement ceremony being held soon after, in front of 60,000 fans on the Nakayama that day with Buena Vista wore a sash that she got from the Japan Cup win. Matsuda spoke about Buena Vista's career in whole - "I'm just relieved she ran and came back without any incident. She has give us some wonderful memories.". Even with a shaky season than usual, Buena Vista strived to win the best filly and mare award for fourth year straight where she won another JRA Award for Best Older Filly or Mare for second successive year in a row with 277 votes out of possible 285 journalists.

== Breeding career ==
On January 5, 2012, she was removed from the JRA racehorse registration list and became a broodmare at Northern Farm in Abira, Hokkaido. She was stalled next to her mother, Biwa Heidi. She retired from the broodmare duty in November 2026 and was pensioned at the Northern Horse Park in Tomakomai, Hokkaido. As of 2026, none of Buena Vista's foals have won graded races. Her two most successful offspring are Social Club and Tantalus, with both having 4 recorded wins thus far.

c = colt, f = filly, g = gelding

No.	Name	Foaled	Sex	Color	Sire	Races	Wins	Remarks
	(abortion)	2013			King Kamehameha			
1st	Coronacion	2014	f	Bay	King Kamehameha	12	1	Retired, broodmare
2nd	Social Club	2015	f	Chestnut	King Kamehameha	19	4	Retired, broodmare
3rd	Tantalus	2016	f	Bay	King Kamehameha	21	4	Retired, broodmare
4th	(Buena Vista 2017)	2017	c	Dark Bay	King Kamehameha			Did not race, riding horse
5th	Buena Ventura	2018	c	Chestnut	Maurice	9	1	Retired
6th	Buena El Dorado	2019	f	Bay	Lord Kanaloa			Did not race, broodmare
7th	Alta Vista	2020	f	Bay	Lord Kanaloa	17	2	Retired
	(unfertilized)	2021			Maurice			
8th	Obra Maestra	2022	g	Bay	Rey de Oro	15	3	Retired
9th	Gran Vista	2023	f	Bay	Drefong	5	0	Retired, broodmare
10th	Pytheas	2024	c	Bay	Rulership	1	0	Active
	(no offspring)	2025			Schnell Meister			
11th	(Buena Vista 2026)	2026	c	Bay	Schnell Meister			

== In popular culture ==
An anthropomorphized version of Buena Vista appears as a character in the Japanese multimedia franchise Umamusume: Pretty Derby, voiced by Fūka Izumi. She is depicted as a kindhearted, emotional, and empathetic girl and the player trainer's childhood friend who waited until they earned their trainer certification before beginning her racing career.

== Racing form ==
Buena Vista raced in 23 races in which she won 9 races (including 6 Group 1 wins), finished runner-up in 8 races, and third place in 3 races. This data available is based on JBIS search, netkeiba.com. and racingpost.com. The races are considered all weather.

Date	Age	Racecourse	Race	Grade	Distance (condition)	Entry	HN	Odds (Favored)	Finish	Time	Margins	Jockey	Winner (Runner-up)
Oct 26, 2008	2	Kyoto	2YO Newcomer		1,800 m (Firm)	11	4	2.3 (1)	3rd	1:52.0	0.3	Katsumi Ando	Unrivaled
Nov 15, 2008	2	Kyoto	2YO Maiden		1,600 m (Firm)	14	4	1.2 (1)	1st	1:34.9	–0.5	Katsumi Ando	(Happy Parade)
Dec 14, 2008	2	Hanshin	Hanshin Juvenile Fillies	1	1,600 m (Firm)	18	13	2.2 (1)	1st	1:35.2	–0.4	Katsumi Ando	(Danon Berbere)
Mar 7, 2009	3	Hanshin	Tulip Sho	3	1,600 m (Firm)	13	5	1.1 (1)	1st	1:36.5	–0.2	Katsumi Ando	(Sakura Mimosa)
Apr 12, 2009	3	Hanshin	Oka Sho	1	1,600 m (Firm)	18	9	1.2 (1)	1st	1:34.0	–0.1	Katsumi Ando	(Red Desire)
May 24, 2009	3	Tokyo	Yushun Himba	1	2,400 m (Firm)	17	7	1.4 (1)	1st	2:26.1	0.0	Katsumi Ando	(Red Desire)
Aug 23, 2009	3	Sapporo	Sapporo Kinen	2	2,000 m (Firm)	16	11	1.5 (1)	2nd	2:00.7	0.0	Katsumi Ando	Yamanin Kingly
Oct 18, 2009	3	Kyoto	Shuka Sho	1	2,000 m (Firm)	18	3	1.8 (1)	3rd*	1:58.2	0.0	Katsumi Ando	Red Desire
Nov 15, 2009	3	Kyoto	QE II Cup	1	2,200 m (Firm)	18	16	1.6 (1)	3rd	2:13.9	0.3	Katsumi Ando	Queen Spumante
Dec 27, 2009	3	Nakayama	Arima Kinen	1	2,500 m (Firm)	16	2	3.4 (1)	2nd	2:30.1	0.1	Norihiro Yokoyama	Dream Journey
Feb 20, 2010	4	Kyoto	Kyoto Kinen	2	2,200 m (Firm)	13	13	1.5 (1)	1st	2:14.4	–0.1	Norihiro Yokoyama	(Jaguar Mail)
Mar 27, 2010	4	Meydan	Dubai Sheema Classic	1	2,410 m (Firm)	16	10	6/1 (1)	2nd	2:31.8	0.2	Olivier Peslier	Dar Re Mi
May 16, 2010	4	Tokyo	Victoria Mile	1	1,600 m (Firm)	18	11	1.5 (1)	1st	1:32.4	0.0	Norihiro Yokoyama	(Hikaru Amaranthus)
Jun 27, 2010	4	Hanshin	Takarazuka Kinen	1	2,200 m (Good)	17	8	2.4 (1)	2nd	2:13.1	0.0	Norihiro Yokoyama	Nakayama Festa
Oct 31, 2010	4	Tokyo	Tenno Sho (Autumn)	1	2,000 m (Good)	18	2	2.2 (1)	1st	1:58.2	–0.3	Christophe Soumillon	(Pelusa)
Nov 28, 2010	4	Tokyo	Japan Cup	1	2,400 m (Firm)	18	16	1.9 (1)	2nd**	2:24.9	–0.3	Christophe Soumillon	Rose Kingdom
Dec 26, 2010	4	Nakayama	Arima Kinen	1	2,500 m (Firm)	15	7	1.7 (1)	2nd	2:32.6	0.0	Christophe Soumillon	Victoire Pisa
Mar 26, 2011	5	Meydan	Dubai World Cup	1	2,000 m (Firm)	14	13	7/1 (3)	8th	2:06.8	0.9	Ryan Moore	Victoire Pisa
May 15, 2011	5	Tokyo	Victoria Mile	1	1,600 m (Firm)	17	13	1.5 (1)	2nd	1:31.9	0.0	Yasunari Iwata	Apapane
Jun 26, 2011	5	Hanshin	Takarazuka Kinen	1	2,200 m (Firm)	16	8	2.8 (1)	2nd	2:10.3	0.2	Yasunari Iwata	Earnestly
Oct 30, 2011	5	Tokyo	Tenno Sho (Autumn)	1	2,000 m (Firm)	18	5	2.8 (1)	4th	1:56.4	0.3	Yasunari Iwata	Tosen Jordan
Nov 27, 2011	5	Tokyo	Japan Cup	1	2,400 m (Firm)	16	2	3.4 (2)	1st	2:24.2	0.0	Yasunari Iwata	(Tosen Jordan)
Dec 25, 2011	5	Nakayama	Arima Kinen	1	2,500 m (Firm)	13	1	3.2 (2)	7th	2:36.5	0.5	Yasunari Iwata	Orfevre

- * Finished second but demoted to third due to interference with Broad Street
- ** Finished first but demoted to second due to interference with Rose Kingdom

Legend:
Turf Tapeta

== Pedigree ==
Pedigree of Buena Vista (JPN), dark bay mare, 2006
Sire Special Week (JPN) 1995	Sunday Silence (USA); 1986	Halo	Hail to Reason
Sire Special Week (JPN) 1995	Sunday Silence (USA); 1986	Halo	Cosmah
Sire Special Week (JPN) 1995	Sunday Silence (USA); 1986	Wishing Well	Understanding
Sire Special Week (JPN) 1995	Sunday Silence (USA); 1986	Wishing Well	Mountain Flower
Sire Special Week (JPN) 1995	Campaign Girl (JPN); 1987	Maruzensky	Nijinsky II
Sire Special Week (JPN) 1995	Campaign Girl (JPN); 1987	Maruzensky	Shill
Sire Special Week (JPN) 1995	Campaign Girl (JPN); 1987	Lady Shiraoki	Saint Crespin
Sire Special Week (JPN) 1995	Campaign Girl (JPN); 1987	Lady Shiraoki	Miss Ashiyagawa
Dam Biwa Heidi (JPN) 1993	Caerleon (USA); 1980	Nijinsky II	Northern Dancer
Dam Biwa Heidi (JPN) 1993	Caerleon (USA); 1980	Nijinsky II	Flaming Page
Dam Biwa Heidi (JPN) 1993	Caerleon (USA); 1980	Foreseer	Round Table
Dam Biwa Heidi (JPN) 1993	Caerleon (USA); 1980	Foreseer	Regal Gleam
Dam Biwa Heidi (JPN) 1993	Aghsan (IRE); 1985	Lord Gayle	Sir Gaylord
Dam Biwa Heidi (JPN) 1993	Aghsan (IRE); 1985	Lord Gayle	Sticky Case
Dam Biwa Heidi (JPN) 1993	Aghsan (IRE); 1985	Santa Luciana	Luciano
Dam Biwa Heidi (JPN) 1993	Aghsan (IRE); 1985	Santa Luciana	Uleika (Family: 16-c)

== Notes ==
1. Hanshin Juvenile Fillies only restricted to fillies in 1991.
