= Marienbard =

Irish-bred Thoroughbred racehorse

- Racing silks of Godolphin
- Sire: Caerleon
- Grandsire: Nijinsky
- Dam: Marienbad
- Damsire: Darshaan
- Sex: Stallion
- Foaled: 26 May 1997
- Country: Ireland
- Colour: Bay
- Breeder: Saif Ali
- Owner: Saif Ali; Godolphin Racing
- Trainer: Michael Jarvis; Saeed bin Suroor
- Record: 17: 8-3-1
- Earnings: £1,124,150

Major wins
- Yorkshire Cup (2001); Jockey Club Stakes (2002); Deutschland-Preis (2002); Grosser Preis von Baden (2002); Prix de l'Arc de Triomphe (2002)

Marienbard (foaled 1997) was an Irish-bred, British-trained Thoroughbred racehorse best known for his win in the 2002 Prix de l'Arc de Triomphe.

== Background ==
Marienbard is a bay horse bred in Ireland by Saif Ali. He was sired by the Caerleon, a son of the 1971 British Triple Crown champion, Nijinsky whose other progeny include the Epsom Derby winner Generous. Marienbard was an unusually late foal, being born on 26 May 1997.

The colt was originally sent into training with the veteran Michael Jarvis at Newmarket, Suffolk.

== Racing career ==
Marienbard was late to develop and did not race as a two-year-old. In 2000 the colt won his first three races including a Listed race at Haydock Park Racecourse. He was then moved up in class to finish second in the Great Voltigeur Stakes, sixth (behind Millenary) in the St Leger Stakes and second in the St. Simon Stakes. At the end of the season, Marienbard was bought by Sheikh Mohammed's Godolphin Racing and transferred to the stable of Saeed bin Suroor. From then on he spent his winters in Dubai and his summers at Newmarket.

In 2001, Marienbard was campaigned over staying distances. On his seasonal debut he captured his first important race, the Group 2 Yorkshire Cup. He finished fifth in the Ascot Gold Cup over two and a half miles, second in the Grand Prix de Deauville and third to winner Vinnie Roe in the Group I Irish St. Leger. At the end of 2001, Marienbard finished seventh behind Ethereal, to whom he was conceding seven pounds, in the Melbourne Cup.

In 2002, the focus of Marienbard's career shifted to middle-distance races and he had his best season, winning four of six starts including three consecutive Group 1 races. In Germany he won the Grosser Preis von Baden and the Deutschland-Preis then capped off his racing career with a three-quarter length victory over Sulamani and High Chaparral in France's most prestigious race, the Prix de l'Arc de Triomphe.

== Stud record ==
Following his Arc win in October 2002, Marienbard was retired to stud duty and was sent to stand at East Stud on the island of Hokkaidō in Japan. In 2009, Marienbard was returned to Ireland to stand at the Kilbarry Lodge stud.
