= Al Maktoum Challenge (thoroughbreds) =

- Class: Group One
- Location: Meydan Racecourse; Dubai, United Arab Emirates
- Inaugurated: 1994
- Race type: Thoroughbred - Flat racing

Race information
- Distance: 1,900 metres
- Surface: Dirt
- Track: Left-handed
- Purse: $1,000,000 (2024)

The Al Maktoum Challenge, is a horse race run over a distance of 1,900 metres (approximately one and three-sixteenth miles) on dirt in late January at Meydan Racecourse in Dubai. The event was known as Al Maktoum Challenge, Round 3 and was the third of three races in the Al Maktoum Challenge series which serve as trial races for the Dubai World Cup but was renamed in 2024

It was first run in 1994 on dirt at Nad Al Sheba Racecourse. It was transferred to Meydan in 2010 where it was run on the synthetic Tapeta Footings surface. In 2015 the synthetic surface at Meydan was replaced by a dirt track.

The race was originally run over 2,400 metres before he current distance was established in 1996.

The race began as an ungraded stakes race before attaining Listed status in 1996. The race was elevated to Group 3 level in 2000 and became a Group 2 event in 2002. The race became a Group 1 event in 2012.

The distance of the event was decreased from 2,000 metres to 1,900 metres in 2024. The three race challenge series was moved for Arabian horses and the event was rebranded as the Al Maktoum Challenge.

== Records ==
Record time:

- 1:56.21 - Walk of Stars (2025)

Most wins by a horse:

- 2 - Salute The Soldier (2021, 2023)

Most wins by a jockey:

- 7 - Frankie Dettori (1996, 1997, 2000, 2002, 2003, 2006, 2008)

Most wins by a trainer:

- 11 - Saeed bin Suroor (1996, 1997, 1999, 2000, 2002, 2003, 2006, 2008, 2013, 2014, 2015)

Most wins by an owner:

- 8 - Godolphin Racing (1996, 2000, 2002, 2003, 2006, 2008, 2013, 2015)

== Winners ==
Year	Winner	Age	Jockey	Trainer	Owner	Time
1994	Cezanne	5	Gary Hind	Hilal Ibrahim	Sheikh Mohammed	2:36.77
1995	Dover Straits	4	John Carroll	Hilal Ibrahim	Sheikh Mohammed	2:34.40
1996	Tamayaz	4	Frankie Dettori	Saeed bin Suroor	Godolphin	2:08.41
1997	Kammtarra	4	Frankie Dettori	Saeed bin Suroor	Saeed Maktoum Al Maktoum	2:03.83
1998	Nabhaan	5	Richard Hills	David Morley	Hamdan Al Maktoum	2:05.91
1999	Spindrift	4	Gary Hind	Saeed bin Suroor	Rashid Bin Mohammed	2:00.53
2000	Dubai Millennium	4	Frankie Dettori	Saeed bin Suroor	Godolphin	1:59.60
2001	Hightori	4	Olivier Peslier	Philippe Demercastel	Gary Tanaka	2:01.59
2002	Street Cry	4	Frankie Dettori	Saeed bin Suroor	Godolphin	2:01.25
2003	Grandera	5	Frankie Dettori	Saeed bin Suroor	Godolphin	2:02.83
2004	Victory Moon	4	Weichong Marwing	Mike de Kock	Mad Syndicate	2:03.30
2005	Chiquitin	4	Michael Kinane	Jerry Barton	Sultan Mohammed Saud Al Kabeer	2:04.70
2006	Electrocutionist	5	Frankie Dettori	Saeed bin Suroor	Godolphin	2:01.06
2007	Eu Tambem	3	Kerrin McEvoy	Ismail Mohammed	Hamdan bin Mohammed Al Maktoum	2:01.53
2008	Jalil	4	Frankie Dettori	Saeed bin Suroor	Godolphin	2:03:35
2009	Asiatic Boy	5	Johnny Murtagh	Mike de Kock	Mohammed bin Khalifa Al Maktoum	2:03.03
2010	Red Desire	4	Olivier Peslier	Mikio Matsunaga	Tokyo Horse Racing	2:02.62
2011	Twice Over	6	Tom Queally	Henry Cecil	Khalid Abdullah	2:05.44
2012	Capponi	5	Ahmed Ajtebi	Mahmood Al Zarooni	Hamdan bin Mohammed Al Maktoum	2:03.05
2013	Hunter's Light	5	Silvestre de Sousa	Saeed bin Suroor	Godolphin	2:03.65
2014	Prince Bishop	7	Kieren Fallon	Saeed bin Suroor	Hamdan bin Mohammed Al Maktoum	2:04.23
2015	African Story	8	James Doyle	Saeed bin Suroor	Godolphin	2:04.92
2016	Special Fighter	5	Fernando Jara	Musabah Al Muhairi	Mansoor bin Mohammed al Maktoum	2:03.09
2017	Long River	7	Mickael Barzalona	Salem bin Ghadayer	Hamdan bin Mohammed Al Maktoum	2:04.20
2018	North America	6	Richard Mullen	Satish Seemar	Ramzan Kadyrov	2:01.71
2019	Capezzano	5	Mickael Barzalona	Salim bin Ghadayer	Sultan Ali	2:05.02
2020	Matterhorn	5	Mickael Barzalona	Salim bin Ghadayer	Hamdan bin Mohammed Al Maktoum	2:04.44
2021	Salute The Soldier	6	Adrie de Vries	Fawzi Abdulla Nass	Victorious	2:03.09
2022	Hypothetical	5	Mickael Barzalona	Salem bin Ghadayer	Sheikh Hamdan bin Mohammed Al Maktoum	2:04.79
2023	Salute The Soldier	8	Adrie de Vries	Fawzi Abdulla Nass	Victorious	2:04.52
2024	Kabirkhan	4	Pat Dobbs	Doug Watson	Tlek Mukanbetkaliyev	1:57.72
2025	Walk Of Stars	6	Tadhg O'Shea	Bhupat Seemar	Athbah Racing	1:56.21
2026	Imperial Emperor	6	Richard Mullen	Bhupat Seemar	Deva Racing	1:58.82

== See also ==
- List of United Arab Emirates horse races
