= List of winners of Japanese Thoroughbred Triple Crown races =

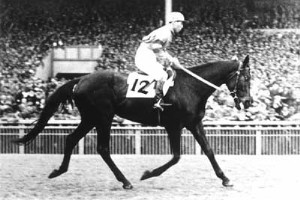
Saint Lite, the first horse to win any of the Triple Crowns (Classic, 1941)

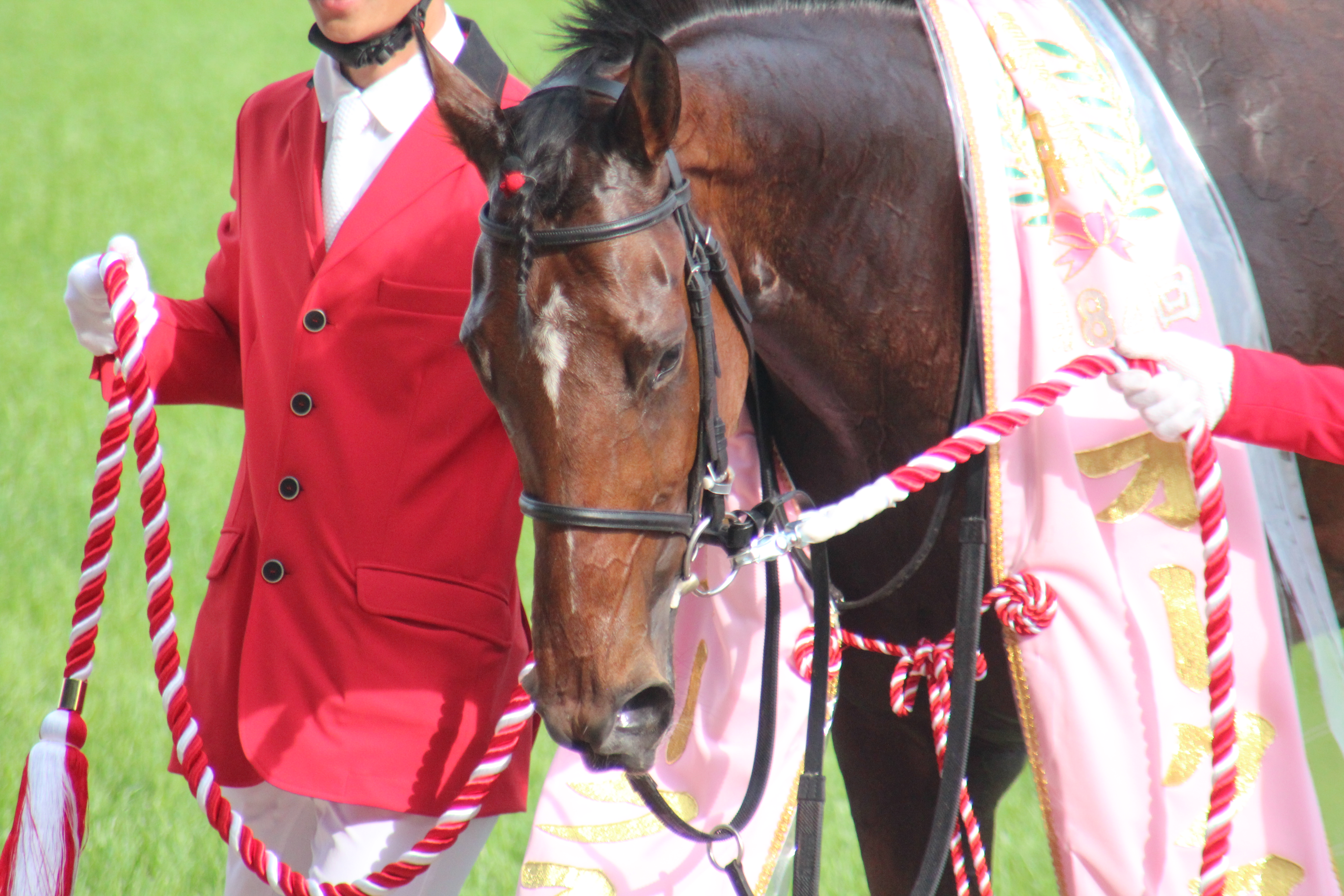
Liberty Island, the most recent horse to win any of the Triple Crowns (Tiara, 2023)

The Triple Crown of Thoroughbred Racing in Japan refers to five national-level titles, each consisting of a series of three Group 1 (GI) races. Organized by the Japan Racing Association (JRA) and the National Association of Racing (NAR), the five Crowns are the Classic Triple Crown, Triple Tiara, Dirt Triple Crown, Autumn Triple Crown and the Spring Triple Crown. Each of the 15 races were established in the 20th century, with the oldest being the Tōkyō Yūshun in 1932 and the youngest being the Japan Dirt Classic in 1999, although three of the Crowns were only established in the 21st century. A completed Crown set comes with significant prize money and prestige, and many Crown winners have been entered into the JRA Hall of Fame.

As of 2026, seventeen horses have won a Triple Crown title; eight have won the Classic Triple Crown, seven have won the Triple Tiara, and two have won the Autumn Triple Crown. No horse has yet completed either the Dirt Triple Crown or Spring Triple Crown, although three horses won the three legs of the Dirt Triple Crown before its formal establishment. 773 individual horses have won at least one Triple Crown race, with 106 of them winning multiple legs across different sets; while no horse has ever completed more than one Triple Crown series in their career, six horses jointly hold the record for most Crown legs won at seven races each: Almond Eye, Deep Impact, Kitasan Black, Orfevre, Symboli Rudolf and T. M. Opera O.

== Triple Crown races overview ==
Japanese Triple Crown Overview
Crown	First Leg	Second Leg	Third Leg	Qualification	No. of winners	Inauguration	Prize Money	Organised by	Ref
Classic Triple Crown	Satsuki Shō	Tōkyō Yūshun	Kikuka-shō	3yo, colts and fillies, no geldings	8	1939	¥300,000,000	JRA	
Triple Tiara	Oka Shō	Yūshun Himba	Shūka Shō (Note: Since 1996. The previous third legs were the Victoria Cup (1970–1975) and the Queen Elizabeth II Cup (1976–1995).)	3yo fillies and mares	7	1970	¥100,000,000	JRA	
Dirt Triple Crown	Haneda Hai	Tokyo Derby	Japan Dirt Classic	3yo, no geldings	0	2024	¥80,000,000	NAR	
Autumn Triple Crown	Tennō Shō (Autumn)	Japan Cup	Arima Kinen	3yo and older	2	2000	¥300,000,000 (Japanese horses) ¥150,000,000 (foreign horses)	JRA	
Spring Triple Crown	Ōsaka Hai	Tennō Shō (Spring)	Takarazuka Kinen	4yo and older (Ōsaka Hai and Tennō Shō (Spring)); 3yo and older (Takarazuka Kinen)	0	2017	¥300,000,000 (Japanese horses) ¥150,000,000 (foreign horses)	JRA	

== Winners ==
=== Key ===
Key for full list of race winners
†	Denotes winners of the Triple Crown
⁂	Denotes winners of all three legs of the Triple Crown before the Crown was formally established.
⁑	Denotes winners of the Triple Crown's first two legs that raced in the third leg and lost (Note: Source in the relevant third leg's row indicates whether the winning horse of the previous two legs ran in that year's race.)
※	Denotes winners of the Triple Crown's first two legs that did not race in the third leg
#	Denotes other winners of any other combination of 2 out of the 3 Triple Crown races
♥	Denotes filly or mare (not included on the Triple Tiara table, as all entries are fillies)
(DH)	Denotes a dead heat between two horses; both horses are considered to have won the race
* YEAR	Denotes the year the Crown was either inaugurated or a leg was changed

=== Classic Triple Crown individual race winners ===
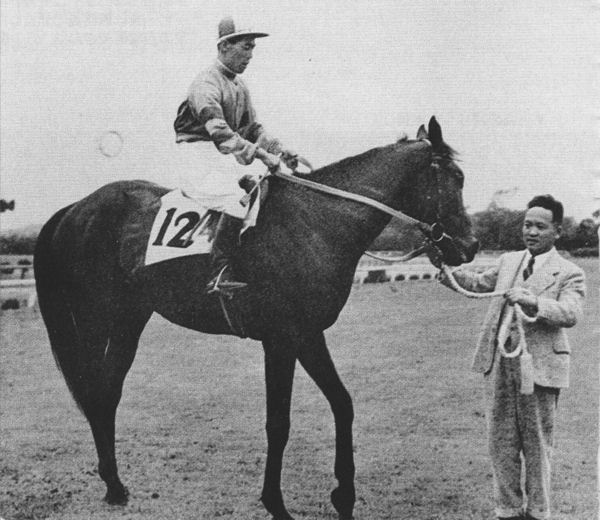
Saint Lite, the first Classic Triple Crown winner (1941)

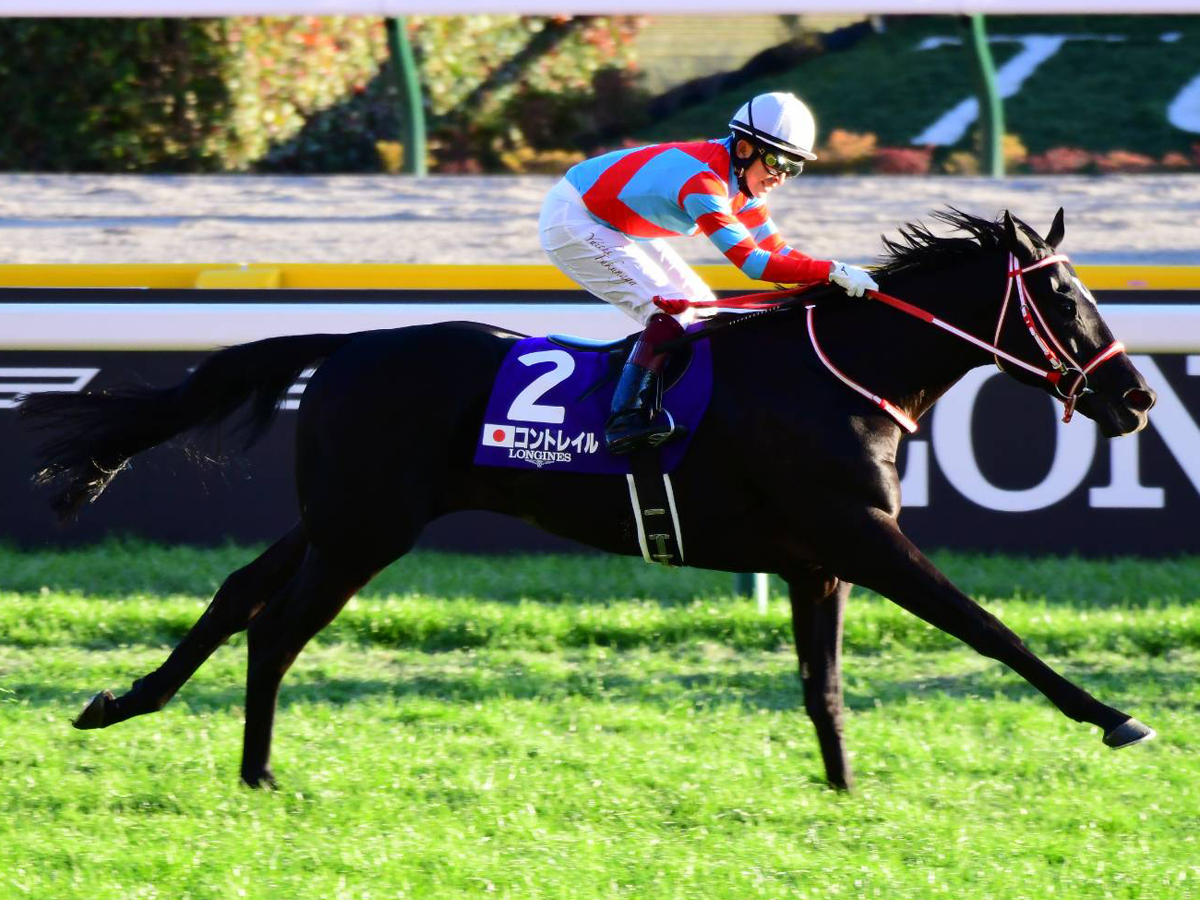
Contrail, the most recent Classic Triple Crown winner (2020)

Classic Triple Crown races
Year	Satsuki Shō	Tōkyō Yūshun	Kikuka-shō
1932	Not yet founded	Wakataka	Not yet founded
1933	Not yet founded	Kabutoyama	Not yet founded
1934	Not yet founded	Flame Mor	Not yet founded
1935	Not yet founded	Governor	Not yet founded
1936	Not yet founded	Tokumasa	Not yet founded
1937	Not yet founded	Hisatomo ♥	Not yet founded
1938	Not yet founded	Sugenuma	Tetsumon
* 1939	Rock Park	Kumohata	Marutake
1940	World Mine	Ieryu	Tetsuzakura
1941	† Saint Lite		
1942	Arbeit	Minami Homare	Hayatake
1943	Dielec	# Kurifuji ♥	
1944	Kuri Yamato	Kaiso	Annulled (Note: While originally run on 8 December with Kaiso winning, the race's results were declared void in January 1945 after officials discovered all entrants had run the wrong course, running two laps of Kyoto Racecourse's outer course instead of two laps of the inner course.)
1945	Race not run (Note: Cancelled due to World War II.)		Race not run
1946	Race not run		Azumarai
1947	Tokitsukaze ♥	Matsu Midori	Brownie ♥
1948	Hide Hikari ♥	Miharu O	Newford
1949	# Tosa Midori	Tachikaze	# Tosa Midori
1950	⁑ Kumono Hana		High Record
1951	※ Tokino Minoru		Track O
1952	※ Kurino Hana		Saint O
1953	⁑ Bostonian		Hakuryo
1954	# Dainana Hoshu	Golden Wave	# Dainana Hoshu
1955	Kegon	Otokitsu	Meiji Hikari
1956	Hekiraku	Hakuchikara	Kitano O
1957	Kazuyoshi	Hikaru Meiji	Rhapsody
1958	Taisei Hope	Daigo Homare	Koma Hikari
1959	Wildeal	Komatsu Hikari	Hakukurama
1960	⁑ Kodama		Kitano Oza
1961	Shin Tsubame	Hakusho	Azuma Tenran
1962	Yamano O	Fair Win	Hirokimi
1963	⁑ Meizui		Great Yoruka
1964	† Shinzan		
1965	Chitose O	Keystone	Dai Koter
1966	Nihon Pillow Ace	Teito O	Nasuno Kotobuki
1967	Ryuzuki	Asa Denko	Knit Eight
1968	Martis	Tanino Harromore	Asaka
1969	Wild More	Daishin Volgard	Akane Tenryu
1970	⁑ Tanino Moutiers		Date Tenryu
1971	※ Hikaru Imai		Nihon Pollow Moutiers
1972	Land Prince	Long Ace	Ishino Hikaru
1973	Haiseiko	# Take Hope	
1974	# Kitano Kachidoki	Colonel Lancer	# Kitano Kachidoki
1975	※ Kaburaya O		Kokusai Prince
1976	Tosho Boy	Climb Kaiser	Green Grass
1977	Hard Berge	Lucky Ruler	Press Toko
1978	Fantast	Sakura Shori	Inter Gushiken
1979	Bingo Garoo	Katsurano Haiseiko	Hashi Hermit
1980	Hawaiian Image	Opec Horse	North Gust
1981	※ Katsu Top Ace		Minagawa Manna
1982	Azuma Hunter	Bamboo Atlas	Horisky
1983	† Mr. C. B.		
1984	† Symboli Rudolf		
1985	# Miho Shinzan	Sirius Symboli	# Miho Shinzan
1986	Dyna Cosmos	Dyna Gulliver	Mejiro Durren
1987	# Sakura Star O	Merry Nice	# Sakura Star O
1988	Yaeno Muteki	Sakura Chiyono O	Super Creek
1989	Doctor Spurt	Winner's Circle	Bamboo Begin
1990	Haku Taisei	Ines Fujin	Mejiro McQueen
1991	※ Tokai Teio		Leo Durban
1992	⁑ Mihono Bourbon		Rice Shower
1993	Narita Taishin	Winning Ticket	Biwa Hayahide
1994	† Narita Brian		
1995	Genuine	Tayasu Tsuyoshi	Mayano Top Gun
1996	Ishino Sunday	Fusaichi Concorde	Dance in the Dark
1997	※ Sunny Brian		Matikanefukukitaru
1998	# Seiun Sky	Special Week	# Seiun Sky
1999	T. M. Opera O	Admire Vega	Narita Top Road
2000	# Air Shakur	Agnes Flight	# Air Shakur
2001	Agnes Tachyon	Jungle Pocket	Manhattan Cafe
2002	No Reason	Tanino Gimlet	Hishi Miracle
2003	⁑ Neo Universe		That's the Plenty
2004	Daiwa Major	King Kamehameha	Delta Blues
2005	† Deep Impact		
2006	⁑ Meisho Samson		Song of Wind
2007	Victory	Vodka ♥	Asakusa Kings
2008	Captain Thule	Deep Sky	Oken Bruce Lee
2009	Unrivaled	Logi Universe	Three Rolls
2010	Victoire Pisa	Eishin Flash	Big Week
2011	† Orfevre		
2012	# Gold Ship	Deep Brillante	# Gold Ship
2013	Logotype	Kizuna	Epiphaneia
2014	Isla Bonita	One and Only	Toho Jackal
2015	※ Duramente		Kitasan Black
2016	Dee Majesty	Makahiki	Satono Diamond
2017	Al Ain	Rey de Oro	Kiseki
2018	Epoca d'Oro	Wagnerian	Fierement
2019	Saturnalia	Roger Barows	World Premiere
2020	† Contrail		
2021	Efforia	Shahryar	Titleholder
2022	Geoglyph	Do Deuce	Ask Victor More
2023	Sol Oriens	Tastiera	Durezza
2024	Justin Milano	Danon Decile	Urban Chic
2025	Museum Mile	Croix du Nord	Energico
2026	⁑ Lovcen		Going to Sky

=== Triple Tiara individual race winners ===
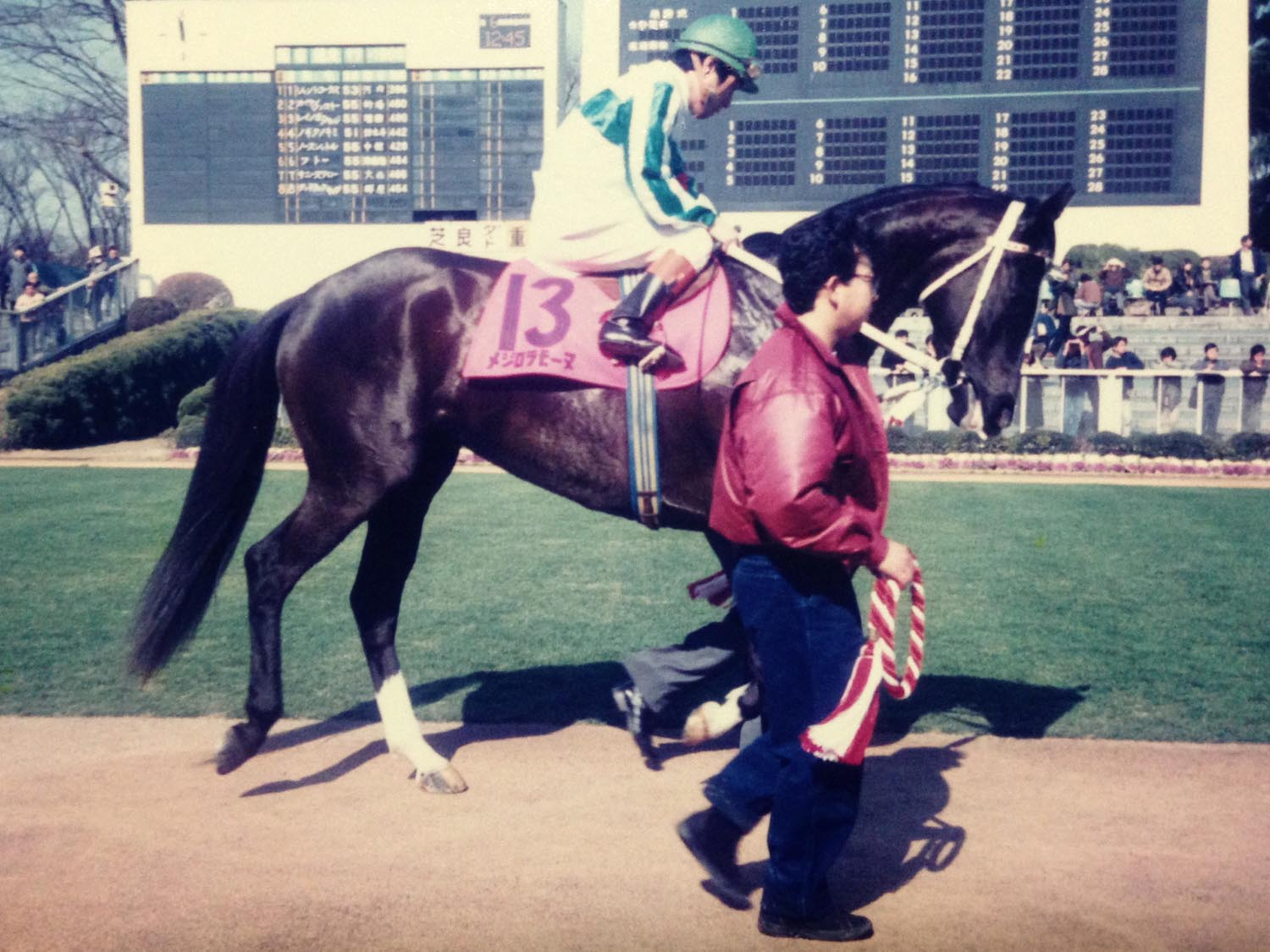
Mejiro Ramonu, the first Triple Tiara winner, and the only horse to win the Tiara when the third leg was the Queen Elizabeth II Cup (1986)

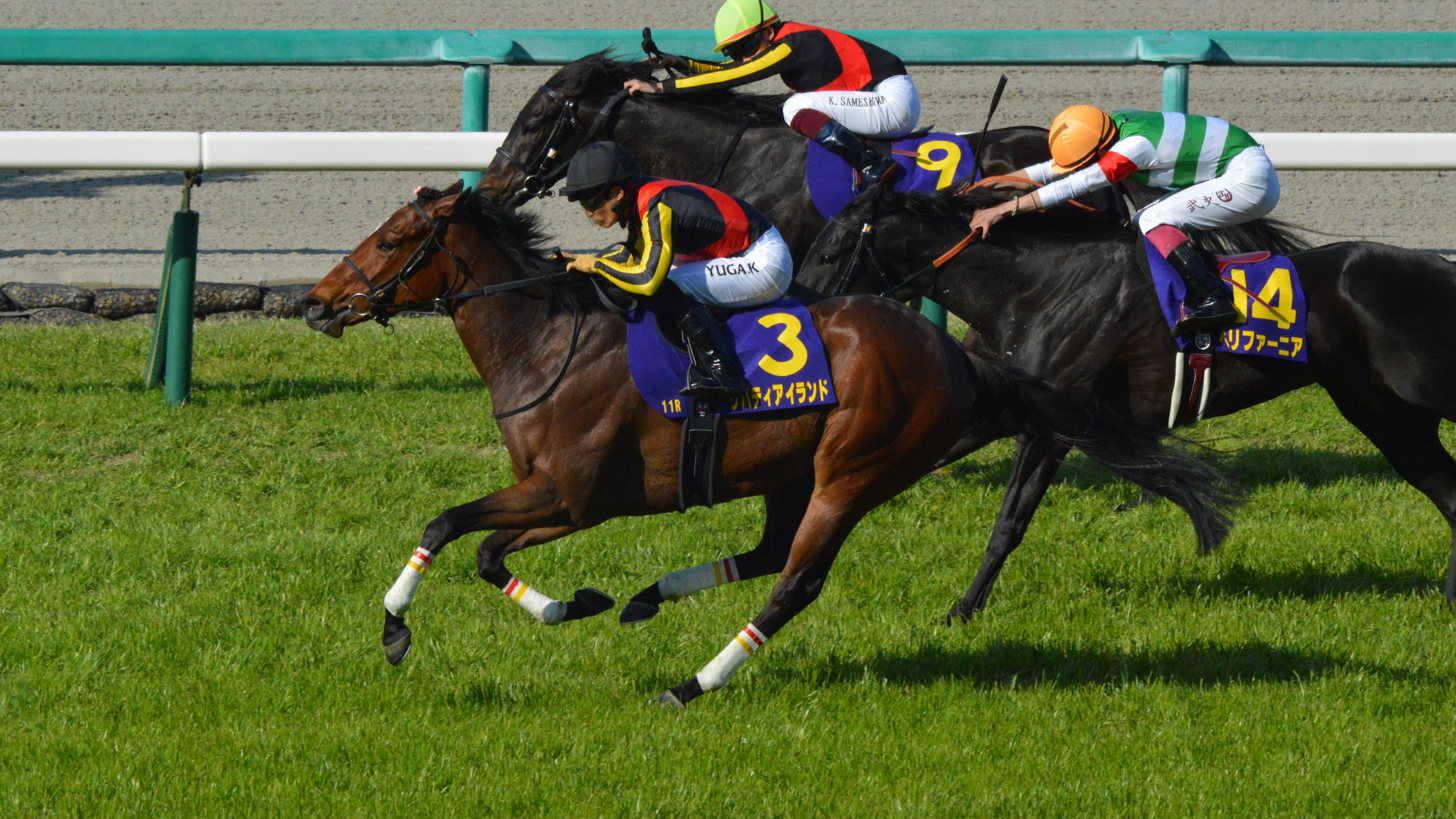
Liberty Island, the most recent Triple Tiara winner (2023)

Triple Tiara races
Year	Oka Shō	Yūshun Himba	Victoria Cup (1970–1975) Queen Elizabeth II Cup (1976–1995) Shūka Shō (1996–present) (Note: Sources for 1970–1975, 1976–2023, 2024 onwards.)
1938	Not yet founded	Asteri Mor	Not yet founded
1939	Soul Lady	Hoshi Homare	Not yet founded
1940	Tairei	Rounella	Not yet founded
1941	Brand Sol	Tetsu Banzai	Not yet founded
1942	Banner Goal	Rock States	Not yet founded
1943	Miss Theft	Kurifuji	Not yet founded
1944	Yamaiwai	Race not run	Not yet founded
1945	Race not run	Race not run	Not yet founded
1946	Race not run	Mitsumasa	Not yet founded
1947	Brownie	Tokitsukaze	Not yet founded
1948	Hamakaze	Yashima Hime	Not yet founded
1949	Yashima Daughter	King Night	Not yet founded
1950	Tosa Mitsuru	Koma Minoru	Not yet founded
1951	Tsuki Kawa	Kiyo Fuji	Not yet founded
1952	※ Swee Sue		Not yet founded
1953	Kansei	Jitsu Homare	Not yet founded
1954	※ Yamaichi		Not yet founded
1955	Yashima Belle	Hiroichi	Not yet founded
1956	Miss Lilas	Fair Manna	Not yet founded
1957	※ Miss Onward		Not yet founded
1958	Hoshu Queen	Miss Marusa	Not yet founded
1959	Kiyo Take	Okan	Not yet founded
1960	Tokino Kiroku	Star Roch	Not yet founded
1961	Sugi Hime	Chitose Hope	Not yet founded
1962	Kenho	O Hayabusa	Not yet founded
1963	Miss Masako	Aiteio	Not yet founded
1964	※ Kane Keyaki		Not yet founded
1965	Hatsuyuki	Verona	Not yet founded
1966	Wakakumo	Hiro Yoshi	Not yet founded
1967	Sea Ace	Yama Pit	Not yet founded
1968	Koyu	Lupinus	Not yet founded
1969	Hide Kotobuki	Shadai Tarquin	Not yet founded
* 1970	Tamami	Jupique	Kunino Hana
1971	Nasuno Kaori	Kane Himuro	Taiyo Kotobuki
1972	# Achieve Star	Take Fubuki	# Achieve Star
1973	# Nitto Chidori	Nasuno Chigusa	# Nitto Chidori
1974	Takaeno Kaori	# Toko Elsa	
1975	※ Tesco Gaby		Hida Roman
* 1976	⁑ Titania		Diamante
1977	# Inter Gloria	Linear Queen	# Inter Gloria
1978	Oyama Tesco	Five Hope	Lead Swallow
1979	Horsemen Tesco	Agnes Lady	Miss Kaburaya
1980	# Hagino Top Lady	Kei Kiroku	# Hagino Top Lady
1981	Brocade	Temmon	Agnes Tesco
1982	Riesengross	Shadai Ivor	Victoria Crown
1983	Shadai Sophia	Dyna Carle	Long Grace
1984	Diana Tholon	Tokai Roman	Kyowa Thunder
1985	Erebus	Noah no Hakobune	Reward Wing
1986	† Mejiro Ramonu		
1987	⁑ Max Beauty		Talented Girl
1988	Ara Hotoku	Cosmo Dream	Miyama Poppy
1989	Shadai Kagura	Light Color	Sand Peeress
1990	Agnes Flora	Eishin Sunny	Kyoei Tap
1991	Sister Tosho	Isono Roubles	Rinden Lily
1992	Nishino Flower	Adorable	Takeno Velvet
1993	⁑ Vega		Hokuto Vega (Note: Despite the similar names, Vega and Hokuto Vega are unrelated horses that were coincidentally named after the same star.)
1994	Oguri Roman	Chokai Carol	Hishi Amazon
1995	Wonder Perfume	Dance Partner	Sakura Candle
* 1996	Fight Gulliver	Air Groove	Fabulous la Fouine
1997	Kyoei March	# Mejiro Dober	
1998	# Phalaenopsis	Erimo Excel	# Phalaenopsis
1999	Primo Ordine	Umeno Fiber	Buzen Candle
2000	Cheers Grace	Silk Prima Donna	Tico Tico Tac
2001	# T. M. Ocean	Lady Pastel	# T. M. Ocean
2002	Arrow Carry	Smile Tomorrow	Fine Motion
2003	† Still in Love		
2004	Dance in the Mood	Daiwa El Cielo	Sweep Tosho
2005	Rhein Kraft	Cesario	Air Messiah
2006	Kiss to Heaven	# Kawakami Princess	
2007	# Daiwa Scarlet	Robe Decollette	# Daiwa Scarlet
2008	Reginetta	Tall Poppy	Black Emblem
2009	⁑ Buena Vista		Red Desire
2010	† Apapane	† Apapane (DH)	† Apapane
2010	† Apapane	Saint Emilion (DH)	† Apapane
2011	Marcellina	Erin Court	Aventura
2012	† Gentildonna		
2013	Ayusan	# Meisho Mambo	
2014	Harp Star	Nuovo Record	Shonan Pandora
2015	Let's Go Donki	# Mikki Queen	
2016	Jeweler	Sinhalite	Vivlos
2017	Reine Minoru	Soul Stirring	Deirdre
2018	† Almond Eye		
2019	Gran Alegria	Loves Only You	Chrono Genesis
2020	† Daring Tact		
2021	Sodashi	Uberleben	Akaitorino Musume
2022	⁑ Stars on Earth		Stunning Rose
2023	† Liberty Island		
2024	Stellenbosch	# Cervinia	
2025	# Embroidery	Kamunyak	# Embroidery
2026	Star Anise	Juryoku Pierrot	Monroe Walk

=== Dirt Triple Crown individual race winners ===
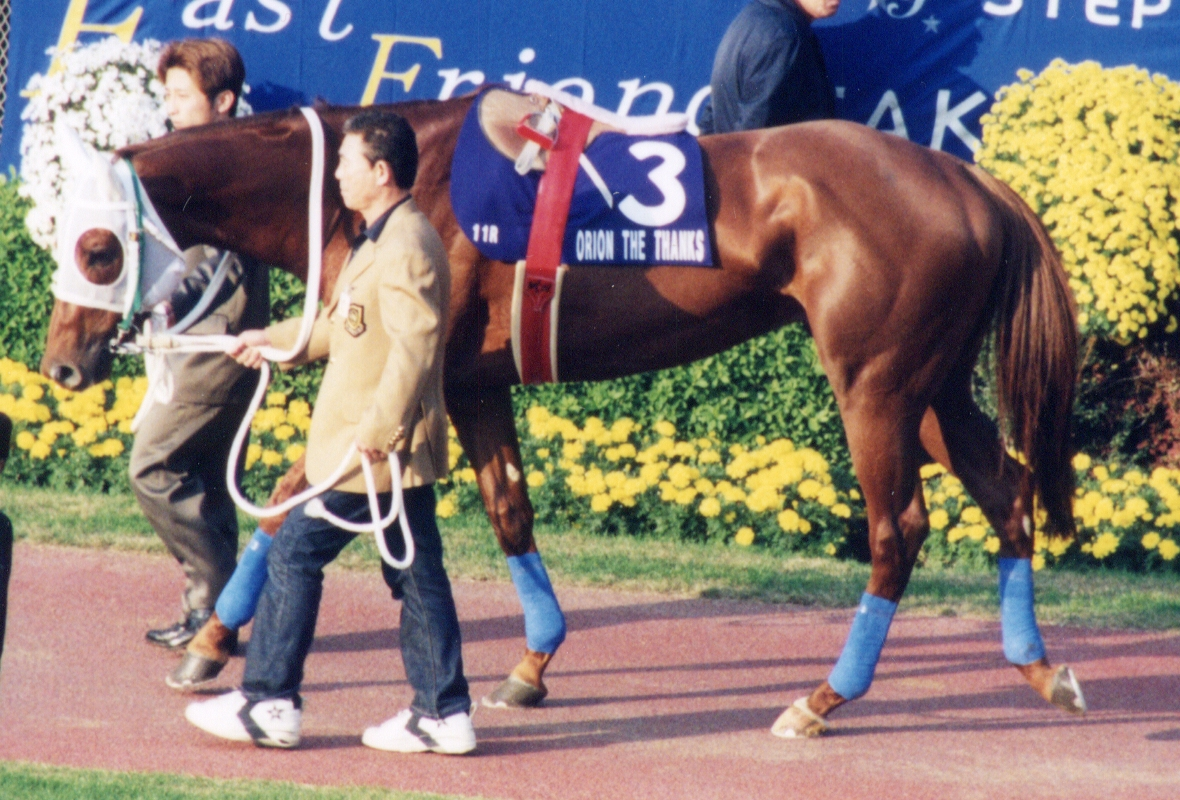
Orion the Thanks, the first horse to win all three Dirt Triple Crown legs before its establishment (1999)

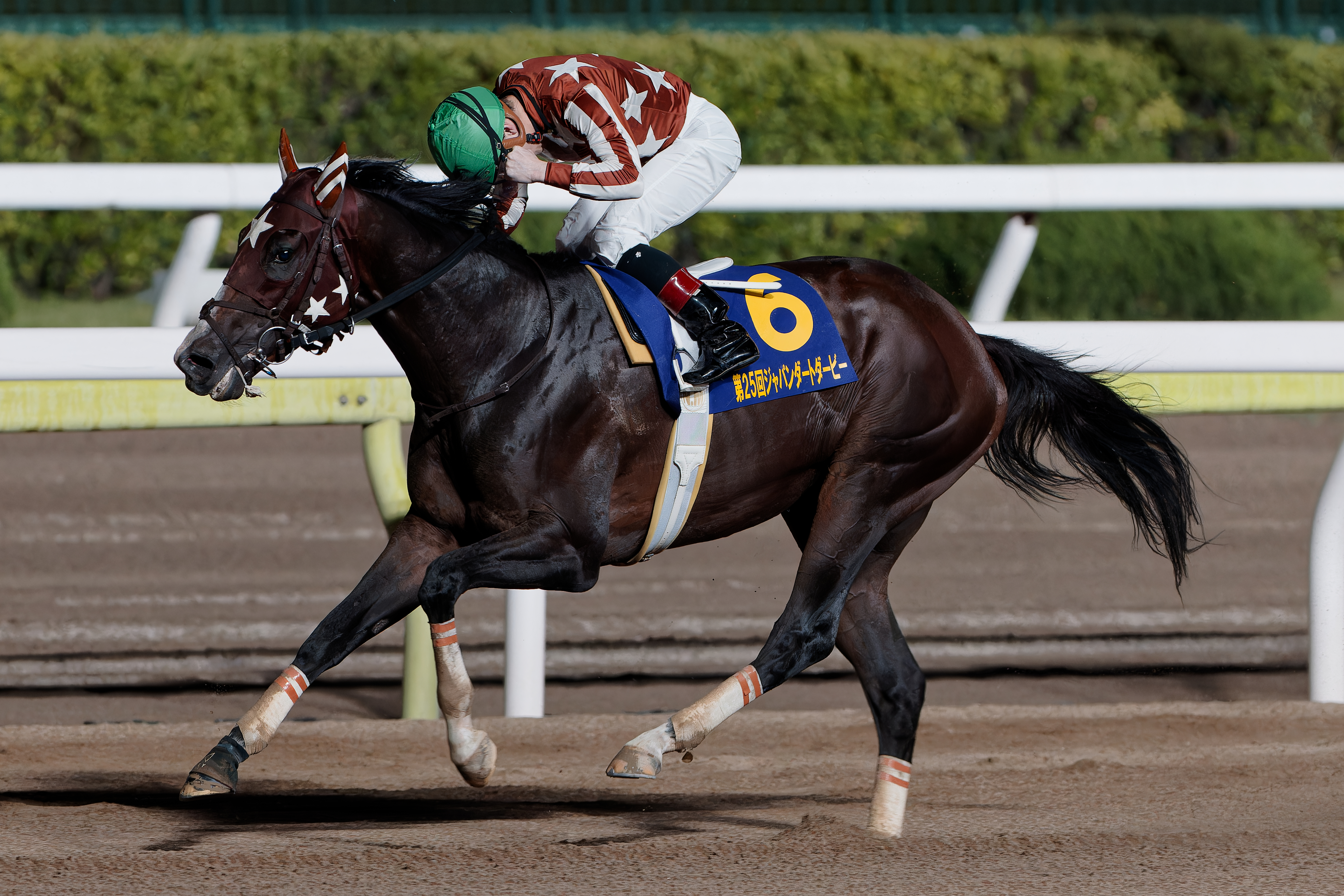
Mick Fire, the last horse to win all three Dirt Triple Crown legs before the Crown's official establishment (2023)

Dirt Triple Crown races
Year	Haneda Hai	Tokyo Derby	Japan Dirt Classic
1955	Not yet founded	Royal Leather ♥	Not yet founded
1956	※ Otone		Not yet founded
1957	※ Hatsuyuki		Not yet founded
1958	※ Daini Kotobuki		Not yet founded
1959	Haru Sekito ♥	Seisho	Not yet founded
1960	※ Daisan Kotobuki		Not yet founded
1961	※ Yaguchi Hope		Not yet founded
1962	Bold Pride	Selcall	Not yet founded
1963	Kokuyu	Shinnitsukei	Not yet founded
1964	Kotobuki Nino	Pearl Mountain	Not yet founded
1965	Masahou	Higashi Yuri ♥	Not yet founded
1966	Ichishiden	Shin O	Not yet founded
1967	※ Hikaru Takai		Not yet founded
1968	China Cap	Wealth Diver	Not yet founded
1969	※ Yamano Taiyo		Not yet founded
1970	Daini Health O	Ryu Tokitsu	Not yet founded
1971	※ Fuji Prince		Not yet founded
1972	※ Tokiwa Taiyo		Not yet founded
1973	※ Yogozan		Not yet founded
1974	Mitsuru Kotobuki	Daiei Monde	Not yet founded
1975	※ Golden Ribbon		Not yet founded
1976	Diehard Kotobuki	Rocky Line	Not yet founded
1977	Takeno Okan	Sango Monde	Not yet founded
1978	※ Hatsushiba O		Not yet founded
1979	※ Soul Shadow		Not yet founded
1980	※ Takafuji Minoru		Not yet founded
1981	Conan Ruby ♥	Suzuyu	Not yet founded
1982	Hospitality	Daishin Shirayuki	Not yet founded
1983	※ Sun Oi		Not yet founded
1984	※ King Haiseikoh		Not yet founded
1985	Maruzen Adiyar	Mirukoji	Not yet founded
1986	※ Hanaki O		Not yet founded
1987	Shinano Davis	George Rex	Not yet founded
1988	Ryuko King	Windmill	Not yet founded
1989	※ Rosita ♥		Not yet founded
1990	※ Outrun Seiko		Not yet founded
1991	Urban Top	Apollo Pink ♥	Not yet founded
1992	Kashiwazu Princess ♥	Grade Shori	Not yet founded
1993	Blue Family	Present	Not yet founded
1994	Spectacle	Kanesho Gold	Not yet founded
1995	Hikari Rufus	Shoji Taisei	Not yet founded
1996	Nike Jaguar	Centric	Not yet founded
1997	Canyon Roman	Surprise Power	Not yet founded
1998	Gold Head	Atomic Thunder	Not yet founded
1999	⁂ Orion the Thanks		
2000	Yellow Power	Hinode Luster	Meiner Combat
2001	⁂ Toshin Blizzard		
2002	Principal River	King Saviour	Gold Allure
2003	⁑ Nike a Delight		Big Wolf
2004	Tokino Kojiro	Adjudi Mitsuo	Cafe Olympus
2005	※ Sea Chariot		Kane Hekili
2006	Thank You Win	B B Tornado	Friendship
2007	Top Sabaton	Ampersand	Furioso
2008	Nick Bunyan	Dream Sky	Success Brocken
2009	Nike High Grade	Silent Sutamen	Testa Matta
2010	Seize the Gold	Makani Bisty	Magnifica
2011	⁑ Clave Secreta ♥		Grape Brandy
2012	Art Sahara	Pretiolas	Hatano Vainqueur
2013	Outgeneral	Inside the Park	Chrysolite
2014	⁑ Happy Sprint		Kazenoko
2015	Studium	Lucky Prince	Nonkono Yume
2016	Turbulence	Baldassare	Kyoei Gere
2017	Captain King	# Higashi Will Win	
2018	Yamano Fight	Haseno Pyro	Le Vent Se Leve
2019	Mutually	Hikari Oso	Chrysoberyl
2020	Gold Heuer	Aime Limite	Danon Pharaoh
2021	Transcendence	Alain Barows	Castle Top
2022	Miyagi Zao	Kile	Notturno
2023	⁂ Mick Fire		
* 2024	Amante Bianco	Ramjet	Forever Young
2025	⁑ Natural Rise		Narukami
2026	⁑ Finger		Silver Ratio

=== Autumn Triple Crown individual race winners ===
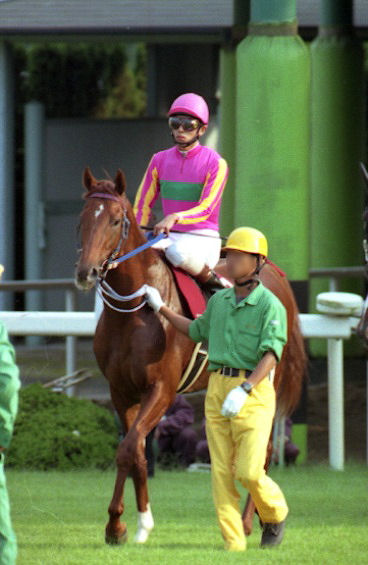
T. M. Opera O, the first Autumn Triple Crown winner (2000), and tied first for most leg wins of the five Crowns at seven victories

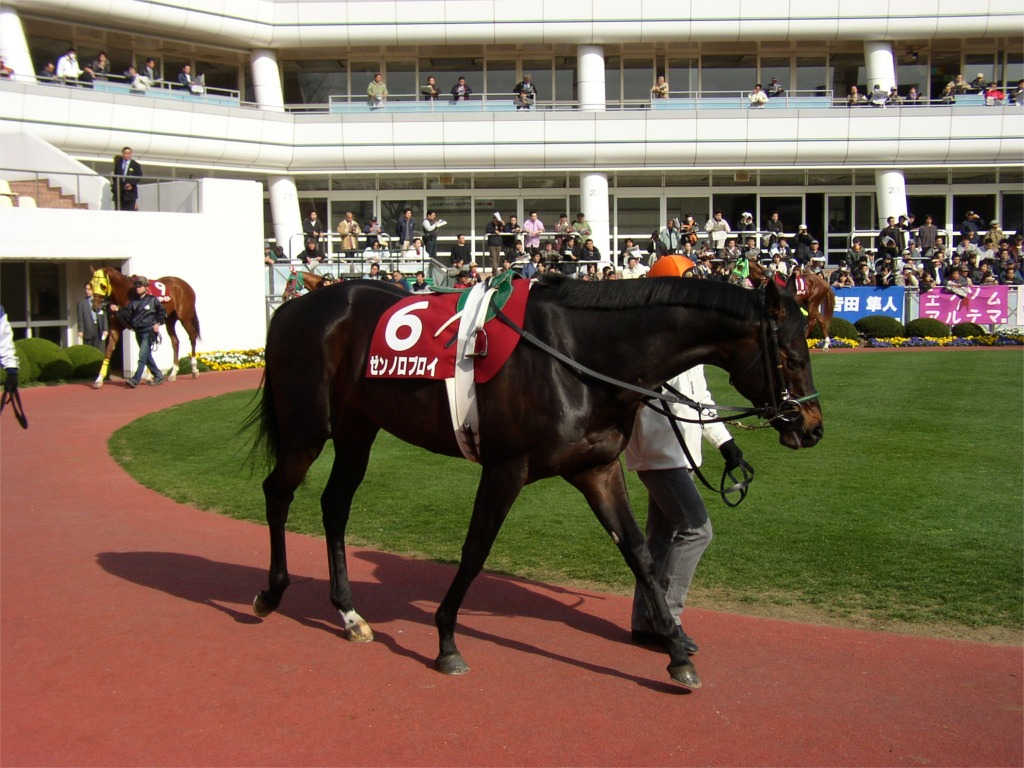
Zenno Rob Roy, the second, and most recent, Autumn Triple Crown winner (2004)

Autumn Triple Crown races
Year	Tennō Shō (Autumn)	Japan Cup	Arima Kinen
1937	Happy Might	Not yet founded	Not yet founded
1938	Hisatomo ♥	Not yet founded	Not yet founded
1939	Tetsumon	Not yet founded	Not yet founded
1940	Rocky Mor	Not yet founded	Not yet founded
1941	Estates	Not yet founded	Not yet founded
1942	Nipatois ♥	Not yet founded	Not yet founded
1943	Kuri Hikari	Not yet founded	Not yet founded
1944	Race not run	Not yet founded	Not yet founded
1945	Race not run	Not yet founded	Not yet founded
1946	Race not run	Not yet founded	Not yet founded
1947	Toyo Ume	Not yet founded	Not yet founded
1948	Katsu Fuji	Not yet founded	Not yet founded
1949	Newford	Not yet founded	Not yet founded
1950	Yashima Daughter ♥	Not yet founded	Not yet founded
1951	Hatakaze	Not yet founded	Not yet founded
1952	Track O	Not yet founded	Not yet founded
1953	Queen Narubi ♥	Not yet founded	Not yet founded
1954	Opal Orchid ♥	Not yet founded	Not yet founded
1955	Dainana Hoshu	Not yet founded	Not yet founded
1956	Midfarm	Not yet founded	Meiji Hikari
1957	# Hakuchikara	Not yet founded	# Hakuchikara
1958	Cellulose ♥	Not yet founded	Onward There
1959	# Garnet ♥	Not yet founded	# Garnet ♥
1960	Ote Mon	Not yet founded	Star Roch ♥
1961	Takamagahara	Not yet founded	Homareboshi
1962	Kurihide ♥	Not yet founded	Onslaught
1963	# Ryu Forel	Not yet founded	# Ryu Forel
1964	# Yamato Kyodai	Not yet founded	# Yamato Kyodai
1965	# Shinzan	Not yet founded	# Shinzan
1966	# Korehide	Not yet founded	# Korehide
1967	# Kabuto Ciro	Not yet founded	# Kabuto Ciro
1968	Knit Eight	Not yet founded	Ryuzuki
1969	Mejiro Taiyo	Not yet founded	Speed Symboli
1970	Mejiro Asama	Not yet founded	Speed Symboli
1971	# Tomei ♥	Not yet founded	# Tomei ♥
1972	Yamanin Wave	Not yet founded	Ishino Hikaru
1973	Tanino Chikara	Not yet founded	Strong Eight
1974	Kamino Tesio	Not yet founded	Tanino Chikara
1975	Fujino Parthia	Not yet founded	Ishino Arashi
1976	Eyeful	Not yet founded	Tosho Boy
1977	Hokuto Boy	Not yet founded	Ten Point
1978	Tenmei	Not yet founded	Kane Minobu
1979	Three Giants	Not yet founded	Green Grass
1980	Pretty Cast♥	Not yet founded	Hoyo Boy
1981	Hoyo Boy	Mairzy Doates ♥	Amber Shadai
1982	Mejiro Titan	Half Iced	Hikari Duel
1983	Kyoei Promise	Stanerra ♥	Lead Hoyu
1984	Mr. C. B.	Katsuragi Ace	Symboli Rudolf
1985	Gallop Dyna	# Symboli Rudolf	
1986	Sakura Yutaka O	Jupiter Island	Dyna Gulliver
1987	Nippo Teio	Le Glorieux	Mejiro Durren
1988	Tamamo Cross	Pay the Butler	Oguri Cap
1989	Super Creek	Horlicks ♥	Inari One
1990	Yaeno Muteki	Better Loosen Up	Oguri Cap
1991	Prekrasnie	Golden Pheasant	Dai Yusaku
1992	Let's Go Tarquin	Tokai Teio	Mejiro Palmer
1993	Yamanin Zephyr	Legacy World	Tokai Teio
1994	Nehai Caesar	Marvelous Crown	Narita Brian
1995	Sakura Chitose O	Lando	Mayano Top Gun
1996	Bubble Gum Fellow	Singspiel	Sakura Laurel
1997	Air Groove ♥	Pilsudski	Silk Justice
1998	Offside Trap	El Condor Pasa	Grass Wonder
1999	⁑ Special Week		Grass Wonder
* 2000	† T. M. Opera O		
2001	Agnes Digital	Jungle Pocket	Manhattan Cafe
2002	# Symboli Kris S	Falbrav	# Symboli Kris S
2003	# Symboli Kris S	Tap Dance City	# Symboli Kris S
2004	† Zenno Rob Roy		
2005	Heavenly Romance ♥	Alkaased	Heart's Cry
2006	Daiwa Major	# Deep Impact	
2007	Meisho Samson	Admire Moon	Matsurida Gogh
2008	Vodka ♥	Screen Hero	Daiwa Scarlet ♥
2009	Company	Vodka ♥	Dream Journey
2010	Buena Vista ♥	Rose Kingdom	Victoire Pisa
2011	Tosen Jordan	Buena Vista ♥	Orfevre
2012	Eishin Flash	Gentildonna ♥	Gold Ship
2013	Just A Way	Gentildonna ♥	Orfevre
2014	Spielberg	Epiphaneia	Gentildonna ♥
2015	Lovely Day	Shonan Pandora ♥	Gold Actor
2016	Maurice	Kitasan Black	Satono Diamond
2017	# Kitasan Black	Cheval Grand	# Kitasan Black
2018	Rey de Oro	Almond Eye ♥	Blast Onepiece
2019	Almond Eye ♥	Suave Richard	Lys Gracieux ♥
2020	※ Almond Eye ♥		Chrono Genesis ♥
2021	# Efforia	Contrail	# Efforia
2022	# Equinox	Vela Azul	# Equinox
2023	※ Equinox		Do Deuce
2024	※ Do Deuce		Regaleira ♥
2025	Masquerade Ball	Calandagan	Museum Mile
2026	Danon Decile		

=== Spring Triple Crown individual race winners ===
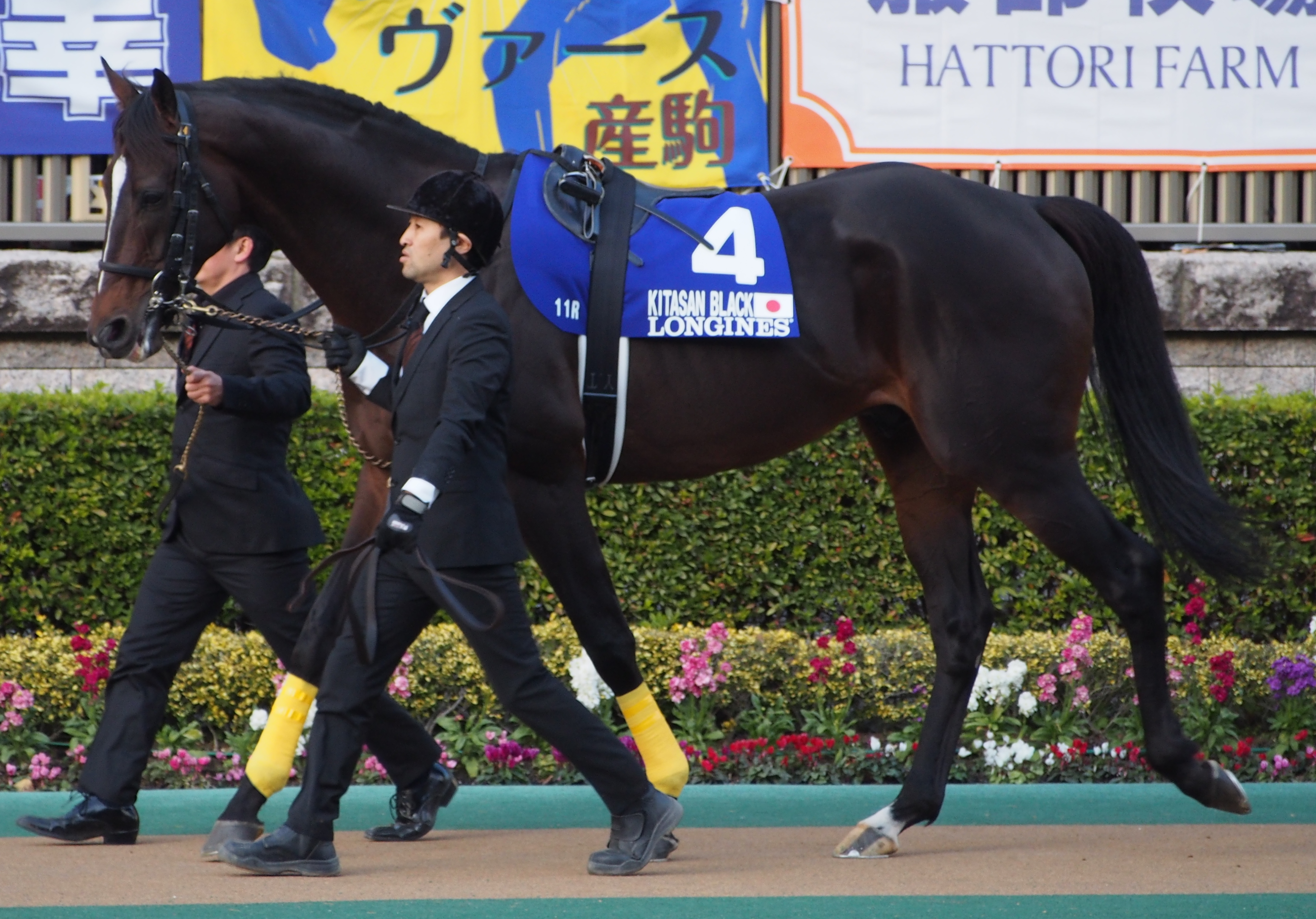
Kitasan Black won the first two legs of the Spring Triple Crown, but finished ninth in the Takarazuka Kinen. (2017)

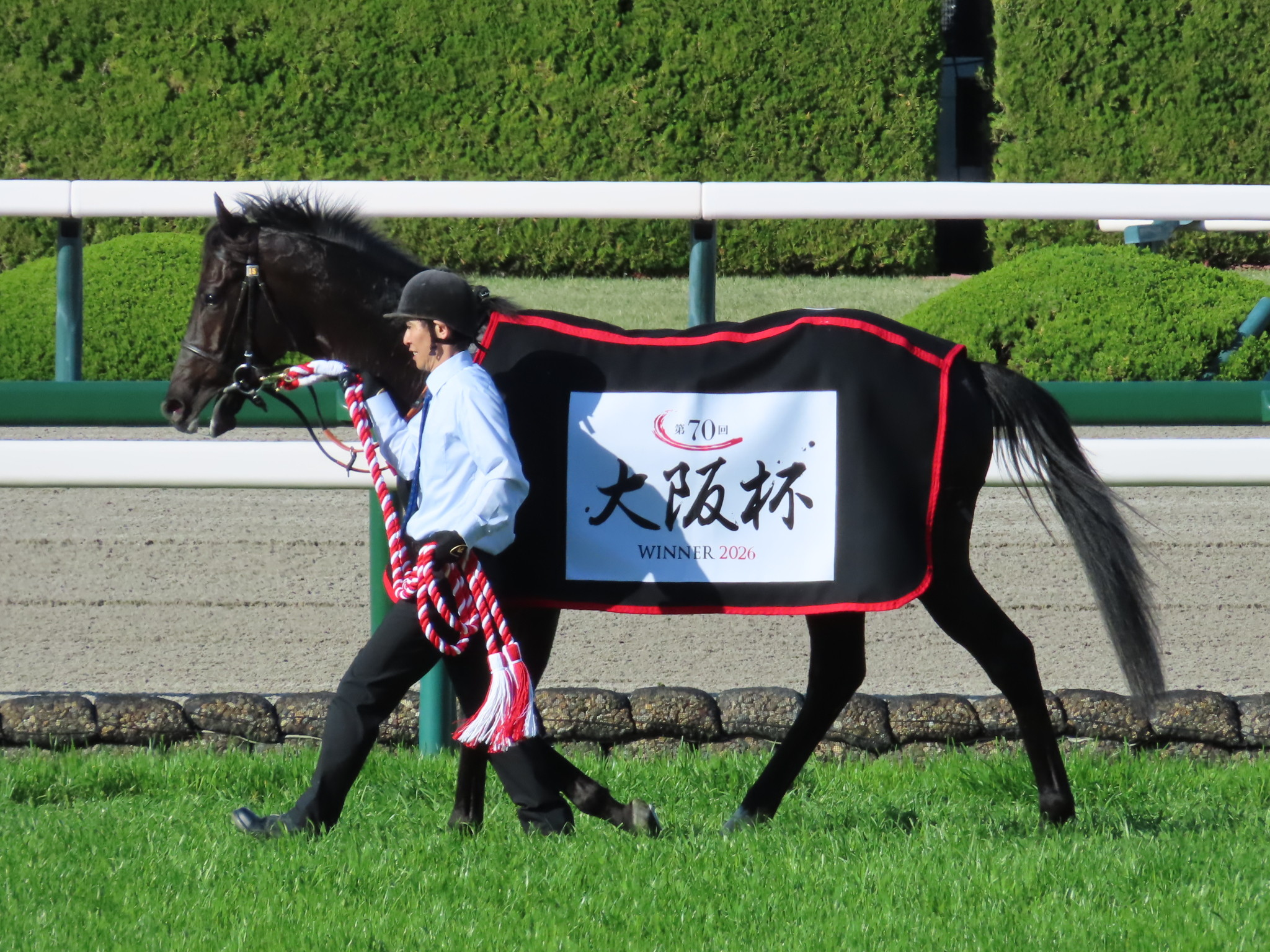
Croix du Nord, Kitasan Black's son, also won the first two legs of the Spring Triple Crown, but finished second in the Takarazuka Kinen. (2026)

Spring Triple Crown races
Year	Ōsaka Hai (Note: Results for before the Ōsaka Hai was a GI race are included under the References subheader. Results since its promotion to GI are sourced from the JRA's website.)	Tennō Shō (Spring)	Takarazuka Kinen
1938	Not yet founded	Hase Park	Not yet founded
1939	Not yet founded	Sugenuma	Not yet founded
1940	Not yet founded	Tokino Chikara	Not yet founded
1941	Not yet founded	Marutake	Not yet founded
1942	Not yet founded	Minami Mor	Not yet founded
1943	Not yet founded	Grand Lite	Not yet founded
1944	Not yet founded	Hiro Sakura	Not yet founded
1945	Not yet founded	Race not run	Not yet founded
1946	Not yet founded	Race not run	Not yet founded
1947	Not yet founded	Olite	Not yet founded
1948	Not yet founded	Cyma	Not yet founded
1949	Not yet founded	Miharu O	Not yet founded
1950	Not yet founded	Owens	Not yet founded
1951	Not yet founded	Takakura Yama	Not yet founded
1952	Not yet founded	Mitsuhata	Not yet founded
1953	Not yet founded	Leda ♥	Not yet founded
1954	Not yet founded	Hakuryo	Not yet founded
1955	Not yet founded	Taka O	Not yet founded
1956	Not yet founded	Meiji Hikari	Not yet founded
1957	Homare Ichi	Kitano O	Not yet founded
1958	Katsura Homare ♥	Onward There	Not yet founded
1959	Kiyo Sugata	Tosa O	Not yet founded
1960	Wildeal	Kuripero	Homare Hiro
1961	Kodama	Yamanin More	Caesar
1962	Sugi Hime ♥	Onslaught	Kodama
1963	Ryu Z ♥	Korehisa	Ryu Forel
1964	Tetsuno O	# Hikaru Pola	
1965	Young Hero	Asahoko	Shinzan
1966	Ballymoss Nisei	Hakuzuikou	Eight Crown ♥
1967	Ryu Pharos	Speed Symboli	Hikaru Takai
1968	Yamapit ♥	# Hikaru Takai	
1969	# Date Horai	Takeshiba O	# Date Horai
1970	Shunsaku O	Riki Eikan	Speed Symboli
1971	Kei Takashi	# Mejiro Musashi	
1972	Fidor	Bell Wide	Shofu Midori
1973	Nihon Pillow Moutiers	Tai Tehm	Hamano Parade
1974	Kiyono Sakae	Take Hope	Haiseiko
1975	Sky Leader	Ichifuji Isami	Naoki
1976	Long Hawk	Erimo George	Fujino Parthia
1977	Gold Eagle	Ten Point	Tosho Boy
1978	King Lanark	Green Grass	Erimo George
1979	Metro Jumbo	Kashuu Chikara	Sakura Shori
1980	Hashi Kranz	Nichidou Taro	Teru Tenryu
1981	Sancy Doll	Katsurano Haiseiko	Katsu R
1982	Sanei Tholon	# Monte Prince	
1983	Hikari Duel	Amber Shadai	Hagino Kamui O
1984	# Katsuragi Ace	Monte Fast	# Katsuragi Ace
1985	State Jaguar	Symboli Rudolf	Suzuka Koban
1986	Sakura Yutaka O	Kushiro King	Persian Boy
1987	Nishino Raiden	Miho Shinzan	Suzu Parade
1988	Fresh Voice	# Tamamo Cross	
1989	Yaeno Muteki	# Inari One	
1990	※ Super Creek		Osaichi George
1991	White Stone	Mejiro McQueen	Mejiro Ryan
1992	Tokai Teio	Mejiro McQueen	Mejiro Palmer
1993	# Mejiro McQueen	Rice Shower	# Mejiro McQueen
1994	Nehai Caesar	# Biwa Hayahide	
1995	Inter My Way	Rice Shower	Dantsu Seattle
1996	Taiki Blizzard	Sakura Laurel	Mayano Top Gun
1997	# Marvelous Sunday	Mayano Top Gun	# Marvelous Sunday
1998	Air Groove ♥	Mejiro Bright	Silence Suzuka
1999	Silent Hunter	Special Week	Grass Wonder
2000	Meisho Odo	# T. M. Opera O	
2001	Toho Dream	T. M. Opera O	Meisho Doto
2002	Sunrise Pegasus	Manhattan Cafe	Dantsu Flame
2003	Tagano My Bach	# Hishi Miracle	
2004	Neo Universe	Ingrandire	Tap Dance City
2005	Sunrise Pegasus	Suzuka Mambo	Sweep Tosho ♥
2006	Company	# Deep Impact	
2007	⁑ Meisho Samson		Admire Moon
2008	Daiwa Scarlet ♥	Admire Jupiter	Eishin Deputy
2009	# Dream Journey	Meiner Kitz	# Dream Journey
2010	T M Encore	Jaguar Mail	Nakayama Festa
2011	※ Hiruno d'Amour		Earnestly
2012	Shonan Mighty	Beat Black	Orfevre
2013	Orfevre	Fenomeno	Gold Ship
2014	Kizuna	Fenomeno	Gold Ship
2015	Lachesis	Gold Ship	Lovely Day
2016	Ambitious	Kitasan Black	Marialite ♥
* 2017	⁑ Kitasan Black		Satono Crown
2018	Suave Richard	Rainbow Line	Mikki Rocket
2019	Al Ain	Fierement	Lys Gracieux ♥
2020	Lucky Lilac ♥	Fierement	Chrono Genesis ♥
2021	Lei Papale ♥	World Premiere	Chrono Genesis ♥
2022	Potager	# Titleholder	
2023	Jack d'Or	Justin Palace	Equinox
2024	Bellagio Opera	T O Royal	Blow the Horn
2025	Bellagio Opera	Redentor	Meisho Tabaru
2026	⁑ Croix du Nord		Meisho Tabaru
