= Triple Crown =

Triple Crown may refer to:

== Sports ==
=== Baseball ===
==== Triple Crown by discipline ====
- Hitting Triple Crown
- Pitching Triple Crown

==== Triple Crown by league ====
- Triple Crown (MLB)
- Triple Crown (NLB)
- Triple Crown (NPB)
- Triple Crown (KBO)

=== Basketball ===
- Triple Crown (American basketball)
- Triple Crown (European basketball)

=== Horse racing ===
- Triple Crown of Thoroughbred Racing
  - English Triple Crown race winners
- Triple Crown of Thoroughbred Racing (Japan)
  - List of winners of Japanese Thoroughbred Triple Crown races
- Triple Crown of Thoroughbred Racing (United States)
  - Triple Crown Trophy
  - Triple Crown Productions
- Canadian Triple Crown of Thoroughbred Racing
- Philracom Triple Crown Stakes, Philippines
- Pacing Triple Crown
- Trotting Triple Crown
- Triple Crown of Hurdling

=== Motor racing ===
- Triple Crown of Motorsport
- Triple Crown of endurance racing
- Triple Crown (IndyCar)

=== Professional wrestling ===
- Triple Crown Heavyweight Championship, Japan
- Triple Crown (professional wrestling), mainly US

=== Other sports ===
- Triple Crown of Alpine Skiing
- Triple Crown of American Football
- Triple Crown of Boxing
- Triple Crown of Brazilian Football
- Triple crown of bridge
- Triple Crown of conformation showing (AKC Championship, National and Westminster Dog Shows), only once won by Roundtown Mercedes of Maryscot
- Triple Crown of Cycling
- Triple Crown (darts)
- Triple Crown (golf)
- Triple Crown of Hiking
- Triple Crown (pickleball)
- Triple Crown (poker)
- Triple Crown (rugby union)
- Triple Crown (snooker)
- Triple Crown (tennis)
- Triple Crown of Surfing
- Triple Crown of Open Water Swimming
- Triple Crown Tournament, cricket
- Triple Crown, of Nordic skiing
- Triple Crown Tour, of USA Ultimate
- Triple Crown of Canoe Racing

== Other uses ==
- Chiappa Triple Crown, Italian made triple-barrel shotguns
- Coat of arms of the Drapers Company, 1439 emblem with three triple crowns
- Papal tiara, the three-tiered crown that was used by popes for centuries
- Triple accreditation, in business schools
- Triple Crown of Acting, for winners of an Academy Award, an Emmy Award, and a Tony Award in acting categories
- Triple Crown Records, a record label
- Triple Crown for winners of K-pop music programs three times
- Triple Crown of National High Adventure award, associated with High Adventure Bases of the Boy Scouts of America
- Triple Crown of Science Fiction, Nebula Award, Hugo Award, and Philip K. Dick Award; only once occurring towards William Gibson
- Triple Crown, the show title for the 2007 Carolina Crown Drum & Bugle Corps which was, in fact, about horse racing

== See also ==
- Grand Tour (cycling)
- Grand Slam (golf)
- Grand Slam (tennis)
- Three Crowns, an emblem of Sweden
- Three crowns (disambiguation)
- Three Kingdoms (disambiguation)
- Treble (association football)
- Treble (handball), for example FC Barcelona Handbol
- Triple Gold Club in ice hockey
- Winston Million, in NASCAR
