= Tokyo Shimbun Hai =

Tokyo Shimbun Hai 東京新聞杯
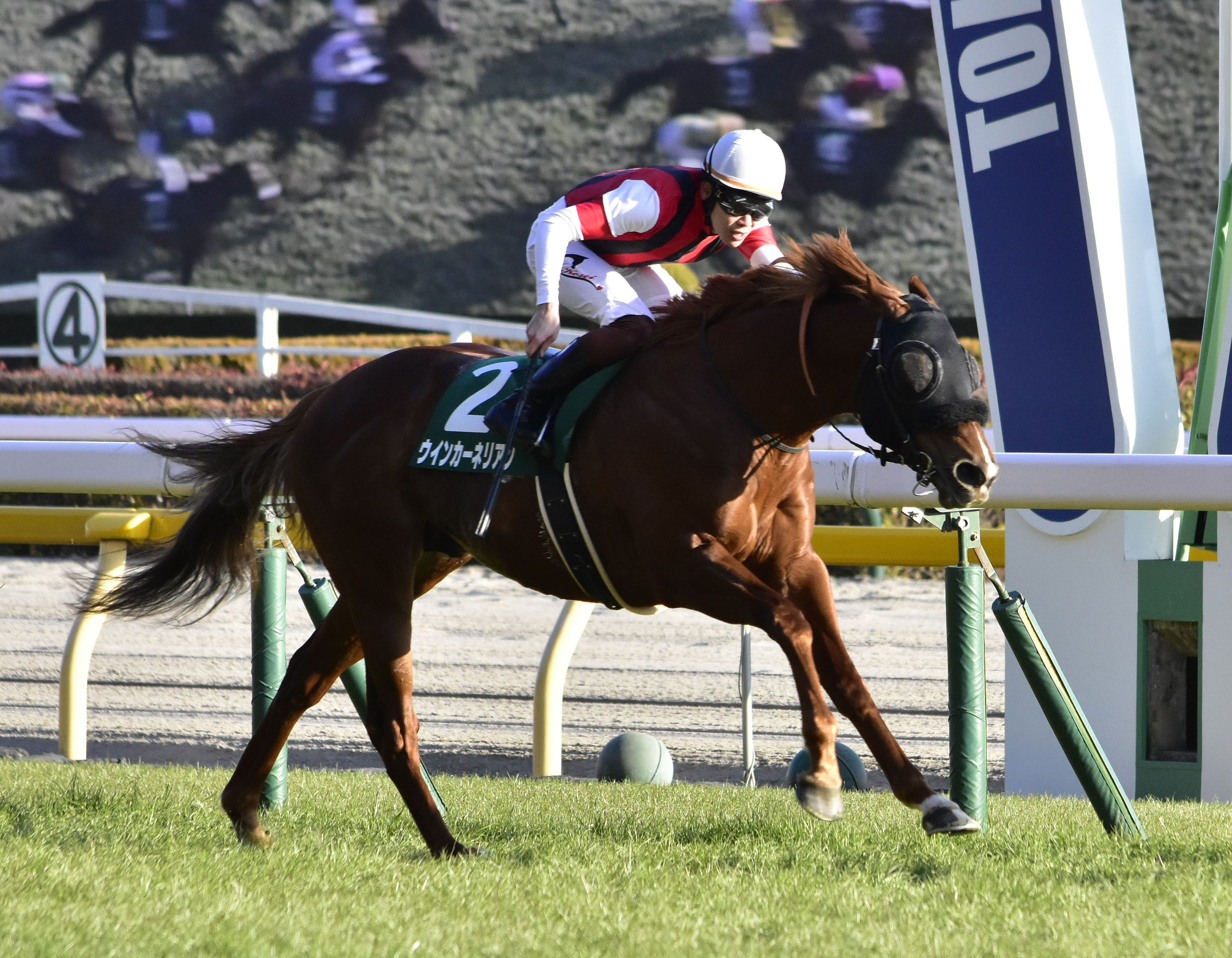
- Win Carnelian winning the 2023 Tokyo Shimbun Hai
- Class: Grade 3
- Location: Tokyo Racecourse
- Inaugurated: 1951
- Race type: Thoroughbred Flat racing

Race information
- Distance: 1600 metres
- Surface: Turf
- Track: Left-handed
- Qualification: 4-y-o+
- Weight: Special Weight
- Purse: ¥ 87,960,000 (as of 2026): 1st: ¥ 41,000,000; 2nd: ¥ 16,000,000; 3rd: ¥ 10,000,000

The Tokyo Shimbun Hai (Japanese 東京新聞杯) is a Grade 3 horse race for Thoroughbreds aged four and over in Japan, run in February over a distance of 1600 metres on turf at Tokyo Racecourse.

The Tokyo Shimbun Hai was first run in 1951 and has held Grade 3 status since 1984. The race was originally run over 2400 metres but the distance was cut to 2200 metres in 1968, 2100 metres in 1969, 2000 metres in 1971 and to 1600 metres in 1984. It was run at Nakayama Racecourse in 1965, 1968 and 2003.

== Weight ==
57 kg for four-year-olds above.

Allowances:

- 2 kg for fillies / mares
- 1 kg for southern hemisphere bred three-year-olds

Penalties (excluding two-year-old race performance):

- If a graded stakes race has been won within a year:
  - 3 kg for a grade 1 win (2 kg for fillies / mares)
  - 2 kg for a grade 2 win (1 kg for fillies / mares)
  - 1 kg for a grade 3 win
- If a graded stakes race has been won for more than a year:
  - 2 kg for a grade 1 win (1 kg for fillies / mares)
  - 1 kg for a grade 2 win

== Past winners ==
| Year | Winner | Age | Length (in m) | Jockey | Trainer | Owner | Time |
|---|---|---|---|---|---|---|---|
| 1951 | Tosa Midori | 5 | T2400m | Yasuzo Tanaka | Torai Hieda | Kenjiro Saito | 2:30.2 |
| 1952 | Mitsuhata | 4 | T2400m | Masato Watanabe | Yukio Yano | Shinichi Kono | 2:29.2 |
| 1953 | Morimatsu | 4 | T2400m | Yasuzo Tanaka | Morikichi Fukuzono | Akimatsu Morishima | 2:36.3 |
| 1954 | Hakuryo | 4 | T2400m | Takayoshi Yasuda | Tokichi Ogata | Nishi Hiroshi | 2:30.2 |
| 1955 | Taka O | 4 | T2400m | Ryoji Furuyama | Daijiro Uemura | Ginjiro Takasu | 2:30.1 |
| 1956 | Otokitsu | 4 | T2400m | Toshio Nihon'yanagi | Fusamatsu Okubo | Washitaro Kawaguchi | 2:31.2 |
| 1957 | Haku Chikara | 4 | T2400m | Takayoshi Yasuda | Tokichi Ogata | Nishi Hiroshi | 2:32.2 |
| 1958 | Mitsuru | 5 | T2400m | Yuji Nohira | Tokichi Ogata | Masaichi Nagata | 2:29.4 |
| 1959 | Kuripero | 4 | T2400m | Hiroaki Moriyasu | Tokichi Ogata | Tomoji Kuribayashi | 2:30.0 |
| 1960 | Komatsu Hikari | 4 | T2400m | Takeo Ito | Fusamatsu Okubo | Shigeo Komatsu | 2:28.8 |
| 1961 | Takamagahara | 4 | T2400m | Kaga Takemi | Kizo Konishi | Taro Hirai | 2:29.4 |
| 1962 | Tokon | 4 | T2400m | Tsutomu Yamaoka | Yukio Yano | Nozomi Shiwaku | 2:28.7 |
| 1963 | Asama Fuji | 4 | T2400m | Kaga Takemi | Yukio Yano | Miya Kitano | 2:29.7 |
| 1964 | Myosotis | 4 | T2400m | Santa Takamatsu | Takeichi Kawakami | Date Masashi | 2:30.4 |
| 1965 | Yamadori | 4 | T2400m | Hiroaki Moriyasu | Suenosuke Mori | Yutaro Shimizu | 2:29.5 |
| 1966 | Korehide | 4 | D2400m | Takayoshi Yasuda | Tokichi Ogata | Yasushi Chigira | 2:28.9 |
| 1967 | Theftway | 5 | T2400m | Yuji Nohira | Shozo Nohira | Haru Suzuki | 2:31.4 |
| 1968 | Onward Hill | 5 | T2200m | Mitsuo Makino | Hiroshi Nakamura | Junzo Kashiyama | 2:16.1 |
| 1969 | Takeshiba O | 4 | D2100m | Takayoshi Yasuda | Suetaro Mitsui | Masao Obata | 2:09.5 |
| 1970 | Masu Minoru | 4 | D2100m | Kaga Takemi | Shotaro Abe | Eiichi Masuyama | 2:11.3 |
| 1971 | Trentam | 4 | T2000m | Masami Tsuboi | Toshio Nihon'yanagi | Kono Michi | 2:02.4 |
| 1972 | Akane Tenryu | 6 | T2000m | Nobuyuki Hoshino | Teruo Hashimoto | Eiichi Sekino | 2:07.3 |
| 1973 | Sugano Homare | 4 | T2000m | Yuji Nohira | Shiro Akiyama | Kotaro Sugahara | 2:01.1 |
| 1974 | Yushio | 4 | T2000m | Hiroyuki Gohara | Kazuo Kikuchi | Katsusaburo Usui | 2:02.1 |
| 1975 | Fujino Parthia | 4 | T2000m | Shoichi Osaki | Yokichi Okubo | Toshio Kitano | 2:02.5 |
| 1976 | Agnes Beauty | 5 | T2000m | Shoichi Osaki | Hiroshi Shibata | Shigeji Sanada | 2:02.2 |
| 1977 | Tofuku Sedan | 4 | T2000m | Hitoshi Miyata | Suekichi Okubo | Yoshiharu Inoue | 2:02.2 |
| 1978 | Suzu Saffron | 5 | T2000m | Hiroyuki Nakajima | Yoshio Nakazumi | Yoshio Komurasaki | 2:01.5 |
| 1979 | Mejiro Phantom | 4 | T2000m | Hitoshi Miyata | Yokichi Okubo | Toshio Kitano | 2:02.0 |
| 1980 | Fuji Admirable | 4 | T2000m | Hiroyuki Nakajima | Tsuneyoshi Mikami | Eiichi Araki | 2:02.4 |
| 1981 | Droppo Lord | 4 | T2000m | Eiji Nakano | Shizuo Araki | Shuzo Takimura | 2:01.7 |
| 1982 | Monte Prince | 5 | T2000m | Masato Yoshinaga | Kichisaburo Matsuyama | Kihachi Mori | 2:00.8 |
| 1983 | Takara Tenryu | 4 | T2000m | Isao Shimada | Tsuguyoshi Sasaki | Sachiko Harada | 2:02.1 |
| 1984 | Symboli York | 5 | T1600m | Eiji Nakano | Takayoshi Yasuda | Symboli Stud | 1:37.6 |
| 1985 | Dokan Yashima | 5 | T1600m | Eizaburo Otsuka | Tomojiro Tanaka | Arai Kogyo Co., Ltd. | 1:35.4 |
| 1986 | Gallop Dyna | 6 | T1600m | Isamu Shibazaki | Susumu Yano | Shadai Race Horse Co. Ltd. | 1:35.0 |
| 1987 | Ebisu George | 6 | T1600m | Chiaki Sakai | Katsutoshi Aikawa | Tomosaburo Kato | 1:35.1 |
| 1988 | Kailas Amon | 4 | T1600m | Tomio Yasuda | Kichisaburo Matsuyama | Amon Co., Ltd. | 1:34.7 |
| 1989 | Tosho Mario | 4 | T1600m | Masato Shibata | Shinji Okuhira | Tosho Sangyo | 1:35.6 |
| 1990 | Hokuto Helios | 6 | T1600m | Yoshitomi Shibata | Takao Nakano | Kanamori Mori Shoji Co., Ltd. | 1:34.6 |
| 1991 | Horino Winner | 4 | T1600m | Yutaka Take | Kunihiko Take | Masao Horiuchi | 1:33.9 |
| 1992 | Narcisse Noir | 6 | T1600m | Yasuo Sugawara | Isao Tanoue | Osamu Awata | 1:34.4 |
| 1993 | Kyowa Hoseki | 4 | T1600m | Yutaka Take | Kunihiko Take | Yoshio Asakawa | 1:33.9 |
| 1994 | Sekitei Ryu O | 5 | T1600m | Katsuharu Tanaka | Toshifumi Fujiwara | Shingen Kanko | 1:33.6 |
| 1995 | Golden Eye | 7 | D1600m | Tsuyoshi Tanaka | Takashi Tsukazaki | Kenichi Takahashi | 1:37.8 |
| 1996 | Trot Thunder | 7 | T1600m | Norihiro Yokoyama | Kazuo Naito | Teruo Fujimoto | 1:34.4 |
| 1997 | Best Tie Up | 5 | T1600m | Yukio Okabe | Yasuhisa Matsuyama | Teruya Yoshida | 1:33.7 |
| 1998 | Big Sunday | 4 | T1600m | Masayoshi Ebina | Tadashi Naka | Big Co., Ltd. | 1:34.2 |
| 1999 | King Halo | 4 | T1600m | Yoshitomi Shibata | Masahiro Sakaguchi | Yoshio Asakawa | 1:33.5 |
| 2000 | Daiwa Caerleon | 7 | T1600m | Hiroshi Kitamura | Yoshitaka Ninomiya | Daiwa Shoji K. | 1:33.6 |
| 2001 | Checkmate | 6 | T1600m | Shinji Fujita | Kenji Yamauchi | Tomiro Fukami | 1:34.2 |
| 2002 | Admire Cozzene | 6 | T1600m | Hiroki Goto | Mitsuru Hashida | Riichi Kondo | 1:37.7 |
| 2003 | Bold Brian | 4 | T1600m | Yoshitomi Shibata | Kazuo Fujisawa | Eiichi Kobayashi | 1:32.3 |
| 2004 | Win Radius | 6 | T1600m | Katsuharu Tanaka | Kazuo Fujisawa | Win Co. Ltd. | 1:33.0 |
| 2005 | Hat Trick | 4 | T1600m | Yutaka Take | Katsuhiko Sumii | U.Carrot Farm | 1:33.7 |
| 2006 | Fuji Silence | 6 | T1600m | Teruo Eda | Fuyuki Tako | Yasuhide Asano | 1:33.7 |
| 2007 | Suzuka Phoenix | 5 | T1600m | Yutaka Take | Mitsuru Hashida | Keiji Nagai | 1:32.7 |
| 2008 | Laurel Guerreiro | 4 | T1600m | Shinji Fujita | Mitsugu Kon | Laurel Racing Co .Ltd. | 1:32.8 |
| 2009 | Absolute | 5 | T1600m | Katsuharu Tanaka | Yoshitada Munakata | Hiroyuki Sonobe | 1:36.9 |
| 2010 | Red Spada | 4 | T1600m | Norihiro Yokoyama | Kazuo Fujisawa | Tokyo Horse Racing Co. Ltd. | 1:32.1 |
| 2011 | Smile Jack | 6 | T1600m | Kousei Miura | Satoru Kobiyama | Yomoji Saito | 1:32.5 |
| 2012 | Garbo | 5 | T1600m | Shu Ishibashi | Hidekatsu Shimizu | Kazuyoshi Ishikawa | 1:32.8 |
| 2013 | Clarente | 4 | T1600m | Yasunari Iwata | Kojiro Hashiguchi | Shinji Maeda | 1:32.9 |
| 2014 | Whale Capture | 6 | T1600m | Masayoshi Ebina | Kiyotaka Tanaka | Masaru Shimada | 1:33.2 |
| 2015 | Vincennes | 6 | T1600m | Yuichi Fukunaga | Mikio Matsunaga | Shadai Race Horse Co. Ltd. | 1:35.7 |
| 2016 | Smart Layer | 6 | T1600m | Hayato Yoshida | Ryuji Okubo | Toru Okawa | 1:34.1 |
| 2017 | Black Spinel | 4 | T1600m | Mirco Demuro | Hidetaka Otonashi | Sunday Racing Co. Ltd. | 1:34.9 |
| 2018 | Lys Gracieux | 4 | T1600m | Yutaka Take | Yoshito Yahagi | U.Carrot Farm | 1:34.1 |
| 2019 | Indy Champ | 4 | T1600m | Yuichi Fukunaga | Hidetaka Otonashi | Silk Racing Co. Ltd. | 1:31.9 |
| 2020 | Primo Scene | 5 | T1600m | Mirco Demuro | Tetsuya Kimura | Silk Racing Co. Ltd. | 1:33.0 |
| 2021 | Karate | 5 | T1600m | Akira Sugawara | Yoshiyasu Takahashi | Hikaru Odagiri | 1:32.4 |
| 2022 | Elusive Panther | 4 | T1600m | Hironobu Tanabe | Takashi Kubota | Tsunefumi Kusama | 1:32.3 |
| 2023 | Win Carnelian | 6 | T1600m | Kousei Miura | Yuichi Shikato | Win Co. Ltd. | 1:31.8 |
| 2024 | Sakura Toujours | 7 | T1600m | Rachel King | Noriyuki Hori | Sakura Commerce Co. Ltd. | 1:32.1 |
| 2025 | Water Licht | 4 | T1600m | Akira Sugawara | Hiroshi Kawachi | Masato Yamaoka | 1:32.6 |
| 2026 | Trovatore | 5 | T1600m | Christophe Lemaire | Yuichi Shikato | Sunday Racing Co. Ltd. | 1:32.2 |

== See also ==
- Horse racing in Japan
- List of Japanese flat horse races
