= Tokitsukaze (horse) =

Japanese Thoroughbred racehorse (1944–1966)

- Breed: Thoroughbred
- Sire: Primero
- Grandsire: Blandford
- Dam: Dai-go Manna
- Damsire: Shian Mor
- Sex: Filly
- Foaled: 10 March 1944
- Died: 19 June 1966 (aged 22); Shimoda, Aomori, Japan
- Country: Japan
- Colour: Bay
- Breeder: Masuda Farm
- Owner: Washitarō Kawaguchi
- Trainer: Fusamatsu Okubo
- Jockey: Yoshiaki Satō
- Record: 30: 11-4-4
- Earnings: ¥1,315,810

Major wins
- Kabutoyama Kinen (1947); Nōrin Daijin Shō (1948); Japanese Classic Race wins: Nōrinshō Shōten (1947); Japanese Classic Tiara Race wins: Yūshun Himba (1947)

Awards
- Leading sire in Japan (as broodmare)

Honors
- Japan Racing Association Hall of Fame (1984)

Tokitsukaze (Japanese: トキツカゼ, Tokitsukaze; 10 March 1944 – 19 June 1966) was a Japanese Thoroughbred racehorse and broodmare. She won the Nōrinshō Shōten (now the Satsuki Shō) and the Yūshun Himba in 1947, becoming an irregular dual classic winner. She also won the Kabutoyama Kinen that year. She finished second in the Tōkyō Yūshun (Japanese Derby) by a head. As a broodmare, she produced Otokitsu (Tōkyō Yūshun, Japanese Horse of the Year (1955)) and Onward There (Tennō Shō Spring, Arima Kinen, Japanese Horse of the Year (1958)). She was inducted into the Japan Racing Association Hall of Fame in 1984.

== Background ==
Tokitsukaze was a bay filly bred at Masuda Farm in Shimoda Village, Aomori Prefecture. She was sired by Primero, a British-bred stallion by Blandford imported by the Koiwai Stud Farm, and her dam was Dai-go Manna (第五マンナ), a mare by Shian Mor. She was purchased for ¥50,000 by Washitarō Kawaguchi based solely on her pedigree, with trainer Fusamatsu Okubo having never seen the horse before the purchase. She was trained by Okubo at Nakayama Racecourse.

== Racing career ==
=== 1946: two-year-old season ===
Tokitsukaze debuted on 24 November 1946 in a race at Tokyo Racecourse, finishing second. She won her second start in December.

=== 1947: three-year-old season ===
Tokitsukaze won three consecutive races at Nakayama and Tokyo in spring, including an eight-length victory over Matsukujira on heavy ground. On 11 May, she won the Nōrinshō Shōten (Satsuki Shō) over 2000 metres by six lengths, again defeating Matsukujira. On 8 June, she contested the Tōkyō Yūshun (Japanese Derby) over 2400 metres and finished second by a head to Matsukujira in a field of twenty-four.

In autumn, Tokitsukaze won the Yūshun Himba over 2400 metres by a large margin, completing an irregular dual classic. She won the Kabutoyama Kinen at Nakayama on 9 November. She finished the season with six wins from twelve starts.

=== 1948: four-year-old season ===
Tokitsukaze won three races from fourteen starts, including a course-record victory at Tokyo in June. She finished unplaced in the Tennō Shō (Autumn) and the Meguro Kinen (Autumn).

=== 1949: five-year-old season ===
Tokitsukaze won an open race at Tokyo on 20 March and was retired.

== Statistics ==
The following table details all 30 starts of Tokitsukaze's racing career. Times and margins were not officially recorded for all races in this era; unrecorded entries are shown as –.

Date	Distance (Condition)	Race	Class	Course	Odds (Favourite)	Field	Finish	Time	Jockey	Winning (Losing) Margin	Winner (2nd Place)	Ref
1946 – two-year-old season
Nov 24	Turf 1800 m (Heavy)	A 3-Y-O	Maiden	Tokyo	– (4th)	11	2nd	–	Yoshiaki Satō	3.5	Neon	
Dec 1	Turf 1800 m (Heavy)	A 3-Y-O	Maiden	Tokyo	– (1st)	15	1st	1:53.2	Yoshiaki Satō	–0.1	(Raimerie)	
1947 – three-year-old season
Mar 23	Turf 1800 m (Yielding)	B 4-Y-O (Filly)	Allowance	Nakayama	– (1st)	12	1st	2:00.2	Yoshiaki Satō	–2.0	(Hatsukabuto)	
Apr 6	Turf 1800 m (Good)	4-Y-O Filly Special	Stakes	Nakayama	– (2nd)	5	1st	2:00.8	Yoshiaki Satō	–0.1	(Brand Baboosh)	
May 3	Turf 1600 m (Soft)	A 4-Y-O	Allowance	Tokyo	– (1st)	6	1st	1:52.4	Yoshiaki Satō	–4.0	(Matsukujira)	
May 11	Turf 2000 m (Yielding)	Nōrinshō Shōten	Classic	Tokyo	– (1st)	14	1st	2:11.2	Yoshiaki Satō	–3.0	(Matsukujira)	
May 24	Turf 1600 m (Good)	A 4-Y-O	Allowance	Tokyo	– (1st)	5	3rd	–	Yoshiaki Satō	–	Matsukujira	
Jun 8	Turf 2400 m (Good)	Tōkyō Yūshun	Classic	Tokyo	– (2nd)	24	2nd	–	Yoshiaki Satō	0.1	Matsukujira	
Oct 5	Turf 2000 m (Good)	A 4/5-Y-O (Filly)	Allowance	Tokyo	– (1st)	7	2nd	–	Yoshiaki Satō	0.3	Tama	
Oct 19	Turf 2400 m (Yielding)	Yūshun Himba	Classic	Tokyo	– (1st)	6	1st	2:40.4	Yoshiaki Satō	–5.0	(Neon)	
Nov 9	Turf 1950 m (Heavy)	Kabutoyama Kinen	Stakes	Nakayama	– (1st)	8	1st	2:10.2	Yoshiaki Satō	–0.4	(East Parade)	
Nov 16	Turf 2600 m (Good)	Nōrinshō Shōten	Classic	Nakayama	– (2nd)	13	5th	–	Yoshiaki Satō	–	Matsukujira	
Nov 29	Turf 2400 m (Good)	4/5-Y-O Handicap	Open	Nakayama	– (1st)	10	3rd	–	Yoshiaki Satō	–	Tokino Midori	
Dec 14	Turf 2600 m (Heavy)	4-Y-O Special	Open	Nakayama	– (2nd)	12	5th	–	Yoshiaki Satō	–	Shimataka	
1948 – four-year-old season
Mar 21	Turf 1800 m (Yielding)	A Handicap	Allowance	Nakayama	– (4th)	6	1st	1:55.0	Yoshiaki Satō	–0.3	(Toyokume)	
Mar 28	Turf 2400 m (Good)	5-Y-O Special	Open	Nakayama	– (4th)	8	4th	–	Yoshiaki Satō	–	Shimataka	
Apr 4	Turf 2600 m (Yielding)	Nakayama Kinen (Spring)	Stakes	Nakayama	– (3rd)	8	5th	–	Yoshiaki Satō	–	Brand Baboosh	
Apr 25	Turf 1600 m (Good)	A 4-Y-O+ Handicap	Open	Tokyo	– (3rd)	6	3rd	–	Yoshiaki Satō	–	Toyokume	
May 9	Turf 2600 m (Good)	A 5-Y-O+ Special	Open	Tokyo	– (2nd)	4	3rd	–	Yoshiaki Satō	–	Toyokume	
May 29	Turf 1800 m (Good)	A 4-Y-O+ Handicap	Open	Tokyo	– (3rd)	8	2nd	–	Yoshiaki Satō	0.1	Marushin	
Jun 5	Turf 2000 m (Good)	A 5-Y-O Special	Open	Tokyo	– (1st)	6	1st	R2:06.6	Yoshiaki Satō	–2.5	(Marushin)	
Jun 19	Turf 2400 m (Soft)	A 5-Y-O+ Handicap	Open	Tokyo	– (5th)	7	4th	–	Yoshiaki Satō	–	Akebono	
Oct 3	Turf 1800 m (Heavy)	A 4-Y-O+ Special Handicap	Open	Nakayama	– (3rd)	10	4th	–	Yoshiaki Satō	–	Akebono	
Oct 10	Turf 2600 m (Good)	Nōrin Daijin Shō	Stakes	Nakayama	– (1st)	6	1st	2:48.2	Yoshiaki Satō	–5.0	(Kiyomasa)	
Nov 13	Turf 2000 m (Good)	A Special Handicap Cap	Open	Tokyo	– (5th)	12	5th	–	Yoshiaki Satō	–	Katsufuji	
Nov 23	Turf 3200 m (Yielding)	Tennō Shō (Autumn)	Imperial Prize	Tokyo	– (2nd)	8	6th	–	Yoshiaki Satō	–	Katsufuji	
Dec 4	Turf 2000 m (Good)	A Special Handicap Cap	Open	Tokyo	– (4th)	15	9th	–	Takeshi Sasaki	–	World More	
Dec 19	Turf 3200 m (Yielding)	Meguro Kinen (Autumn)	Stakes	Tokyo	– (8th)	9	7th	–	Yoshiaki Satō	–	Sefetes	
1949 – five-year-old season
Mar 13	Turf 1800 m (Good)	Special Handicap Cap	Open	Tokyo	– (1st)	10	6th	–	Yoshiaki Satō	–	Tokino Hoshi	
Mar 20	Turf 2000 m (Good)	Open	Open	Tokyo	– (2nd)	6	1st	2:08.0	Yoshiaki Satō	–1.0	(Brand Light)	

== Stud career ==
Tokitsukaze entered stud at Masuda Farm in 1949. She produced sixteen foals over seventeen years. Her major progeny included Otokitsu (オートキツ), who won the 1955 Tōkyō Yūshun by eight lengths on heavy ground, and Onward There (オンワードゼア), who won the Tennō Shō (Spring) and Arima Kinen. Both were named Horse of the Year in their respective seasons.

Tokitsukaze died of uterine haemorrhage on 19 June 1966, shortly after foaling her sixteenth offspring.

=== Notable progeny ===
Progeny	Major wins
Otokitsu (オートキツ)	Tōkyō Yūshun, Diamond Stakes, Tokyo Hai; Japanese Horse of the Year (1955)
Onward There (オンワードゼア)	Tennō Shō (Spring), Arima Kinen, Nakayama 4-Y-O Stakes, Nihon Keizai Shō; Japanese Horse of the Year (1958)

== Pedigree ==
Pedigree of Tokitsukaze (JPN)
Sire Primero (GB) 1931	Blandford (GB); 1919	Swynford	John o'Gaunt
Sire Primero (GB) 1931	Blandford (GB); 1919	Swynford	Canterbury Pilgrim
Sire Primero (GB) 1931	Blandford (GB); 1919	Blanche	White Eagle
Sire Primero (GB) 1931	Blandford (GB); 1919	Blanche	Black Cherry
Sire Primero (GB) 1931	Athasi (GB); 1917	Farasi	Desmond
Sire Primero (GB) 1931	Athasi (GB); 1917	Farasi	Molly Morgan
Sire Primero (GB) 1931	Athasi (GB); 1917	Athgreany	Galloping Simon
Sire Primero (GB) 1931	Athasi (GB); 1917	Athgreany	Fairyland
Dam Dai-go Manna (JPN) 1939	Shian Mor (GB); 1924	Buchan	Sunstar
Dam Dai-go Manna (JPN) 1939	Shian Mor (GB); 1924	Buchan	Hamoaze
Dam Dai-go Manna (JPN) 1939	Shian Mor (GB); 1924	Orlass	Orby
Dam Dai-go Manna (JPN) 1939	Shian Mor (GB); 1924	Orlass	Simon Lass
Dam Dai-go Manna (JPN) 1939	Manna (JPN); 1928	Clackmannan	Lomond
Dam Dai-go Manna (JPN) 1939	Manna (JPN); 1928	Clackmannan	Pretty Polly
Dam Dai-go Manna (JPN) 1939	Manna (JPN); 1928	Dai-san Frustrate	Intaglio
Dam Dai-go Manna (JPN) 1939	Manna (JPN); 1928	Dai-san Frustrate	Frustrate

- Tokitsukaze is inbred 4 × 5 to Desmond and 5 × 5 to Gallinule.
- Her sire Primero was imported by Koiwai Stud Farm in 1936 and was a dominant stallion in Japan, siring multiple classic winners.
- Her dam Dai-go Manna was bred at Koiwai Stud Farm. The female line traces back to Frustrate, one of Koiwai's foundation mares.

== See also ==
- Thoroughbred racing in Japan
- Tōkyō Yūshun
- Satsuki Shō
