= Triple Crown of Motorsport =

Motorsport achievement

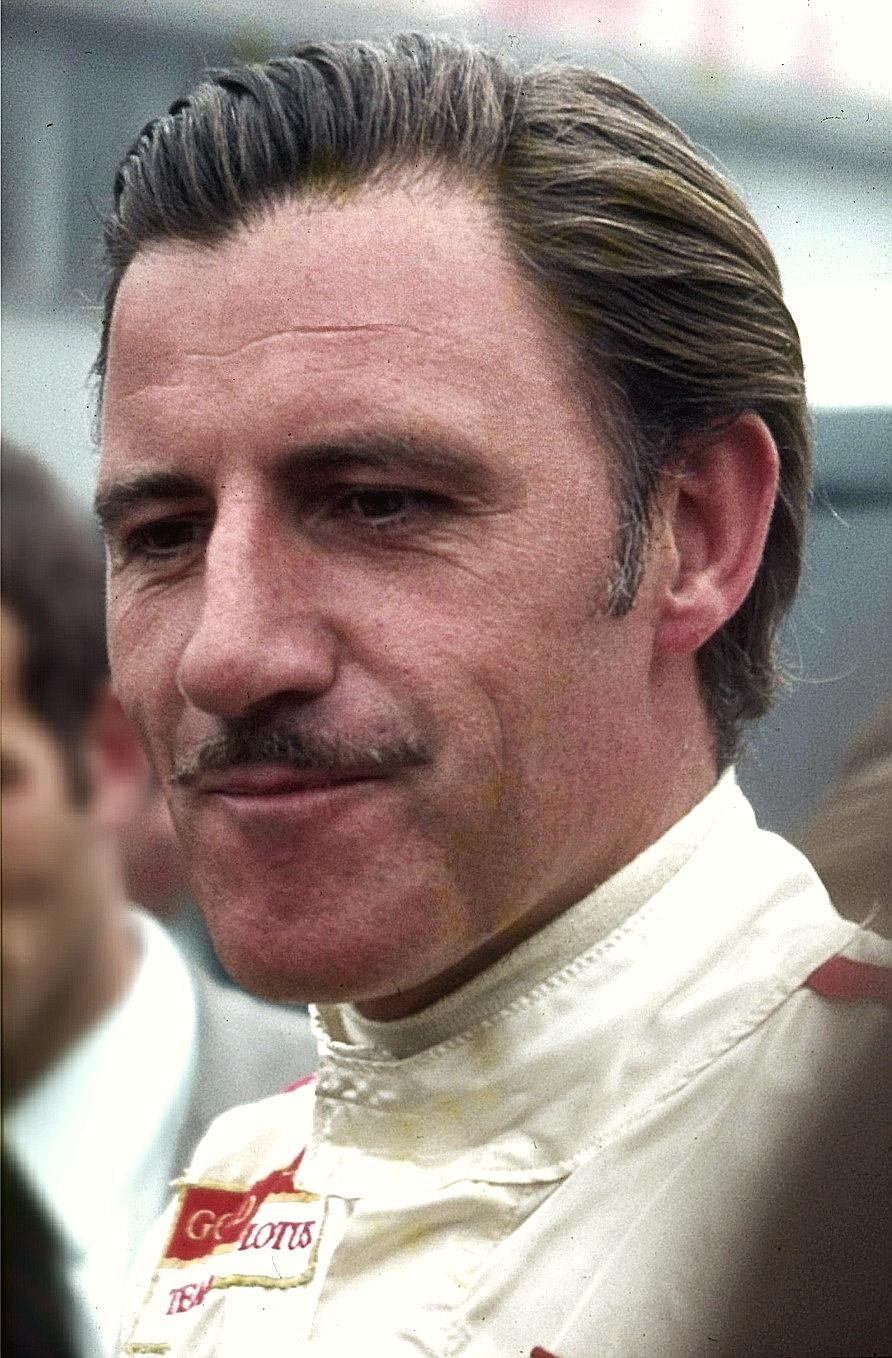
Graham Hill (pictured in 1969) is the only driver to have completed the Triple Crown.

The Triple Crown of Motorsport is an unofficial motorsport achievement, often regarded as associated with the three most important achievements of a driver in motorsport, inspired by the triple crown of thoroughbred racing.

The earliest version of the Triple Crown requires that the driver wins the:

- Indianapolis 500 (first held in 1911)
- 24 Hours of Le Mans (first held in 1923)
- World Drivers' Championship of Formula One (first held in 1950)

However, under a more recent popular definition the World Drivers' Championship is replaced by the Monaco Grand Prix (first held in 1929).

Graham Hill is the only driver to have completed the Triple Crown by either its World Drivers' Championship or Monaco Grand Prix definition. Among active drivers, Fernando Alonso is the only one to have won two of three events in both versions of the crown, having won the 2018 and 2019 24 Hours of Le Mans, the 2005 and 2006 World Drivers' Championships, and the 2006 and 2007 editions of the Monaco Grand Prix. The Indianapolis 500 and Monaco Grand Prix themselves have been parts of the World Drivers' Championship during various periods: the Indy 500 from 1950 to 1960, and the Monaco Grand Prix from 1950 to present.

McLaren is the only racing team to have completed the Crown, along with several manufacturers whose equipment won the component races. Equivalent concepts also exist within specific disciplines of motor racing.

== Other definitions ==
=== Endurance racing ===
The Triple Crown of endurance racing features Le Mans and has added the 24 Hours of Daytona and the 12 Hours of Sebring. This crown has been won by several drivers, namely Phil Hill, A. J. Foyt, Hans Herrmann, Jackie Oliver, Al Holbert, Hurley Haywood, Mauro Baldi, Andy Wallace, Marco Werner, Timo Bernhard and Nick Tandy. Many drivers have come close to winning the crown with second-place finishes in the third event, such as Ken Miles (1966 24 Hours of Le Mans), Mario Andretti (Le Mans 1995) and Allan McNish (Daytona 2012).

=== IndyCar racing ===
In the period of 1971–1989, Indy car racing contested their own Triple Crown. From 1971 to 1980 it consisted of the three 500-mile events on the calendar: the Indianapolis 500, Pocono 500, and California 500. Ontario Motor Speedway was closed in 1980, and the California 500 was replaced with the Michigan 500. The triple crown continued through 1989, after which the Pocono race was discontinued. No driver won all three events during the 1980s.

The IndyCar Triple Crown was revived in 2013, with the 1971–80 format of the Indianapolis 500 (in May), Pocono 500 (in July - 400 miles the first year), and the MAVTV 500 (in October, held at Fontana). A $1 million bonus prize was offered for any driver to win all three races.

For 2014, Pocono returned to the 500-mile format, Fontana was moved to the season ending race in August and all three events awarded double championship points. Since the California 500's return under IndyCar sanction, it has been a night race.

In 2015, Fontana moved to July, while Pocono was the penultimate race of the season in August. Fontana was removed from the IndyCar calendar after 2015, and Pocono was removed from the IndyCar calendar after 2019.

Of all variations of the IndyCar Triple Crown, only six drivers have achieved the feat over their career, namely Bobby Unser, A. J. Foyt, Al Unser, Johnny Rutherford, Danny Sullivan and Rick Mears, with Al Unser the only one to achieve it in a single season, 1978.

=== NASCAR ===
The Triple Crown of NASCAR includes the Daytona 500, the Coca-Cola 600, and the Southern 500. This crown has been won by several drivers, namely Jeff Gordon, Jimmie Johnson, Darrell Waltrip, David Pearson, Dale Earnhardt, Denny Hamlin, and Kevin Harvick. Many drivers have come close to winning the crown with second-place finishes in the third event, such as Dale Earnhardt Jr. (Darlington 2014), Kyle Busch (Daytona 2019), Tony Stewart (Daytona 2004 and 2008), Matt Kenseth (Darlington 2006 and 2015), Bobby Allison (Charlotte 1971, 1972, 1975, and 1982), Cale Yarborough (Charlotte 1968), Mark Martin (Daytona 2007), and Bill Elliott (Daytona 1990 and 1992).

=== NHRA ===
The term is often used during the season in the National Hot Rod Association to refer to its three most prestigious races, the Winternationals, the U.S. Nationals, and the Finals. The Winternationals is the event that kicks off the NHRA season, held during the second weekend in February, the U.S. Nationals is often called "The oldest, richest, and most prestigious race in the NHRA," and carries the largest purse of any event on the schedule, and the Auto Club Finals at Pomona are held to mark the end of the NHRA season.

Both the Winternationals, and the Auto Club Finals are held on the same track, Auto Club Raceway at Pomona, while the U.S. Nationals has been held at Lucas Oil Raceway in Indianapolis since 1961 (prior to that, the race was held on a now demolished track in Detroit). By far, the person with the most Triple Crown wins in his division is 16-time funny car champion John Force.

=== American motorsport ===
A. J. Foyt and Mario Andretti are the only drivers to have won both the Indianapolis 500 and the Daytona 500. Both drivers also won the Rolex 24 at Daytona and 12 Hours of Sebring. Foyt won four editions of the Indianapolis 500, and collected seven open-wheel titles and a 24 Hours of Le Mans win. Andretti won three editions of the 12 Hours of Sebring, the 1969 Indianapolis 500, and also won four open-wheel titles, a Formula One world championship, and a class win and second overall finish at the 1995 24 Hours of Le Mans.

=== Australian motorsport ===
In Australia, a driver is said to have achieved the "Triple Crown" if they win the Sandown 500, the Bathurst 1000 and the Supercars Championship (formerly the Australian Touring Car Championship) in the same year. Only two drivers have achieved this feat: Peter Brock in 1978 and 1980 and Craig Lowndes in 1996.

=== Japanese motorsport ===
The Japanese Triple Crown is achieved by winning titles in Japanese Formula 3, Super Formula, and Super GT. The only driver to have completed the feat is current Formula E driver Nick Cassidy.

== List of Triple Crown winners ==
=== Individuals ===
Events which make up the traditional (Indy 500 / Le Mans 24hr / F1 WDC) and the alternative (Indy 500 / Le Mans 24hr / Monaco GP) definitions are included below.

Driver	Indianapolis 500 winner	24 Hours of Le Mans winner	Monaco Grand Prix winner	F1 World Champion
(United Kingdom) Graham Hill	1966	1972	1963, 1964, 1965, 1968, 1969	1962, 1968

=== Teams and manufacturers ===
Listed below are the teams and manufacturers to have completed the Triple Crown. Though the achievement is typically used to refer to an individual driver's achievements, some organisations have also been credited for their wins across multiple drivers. As of 2026, only three entities have completed the Triple Crown:

- Mercedes completed the Triple Crown as both a chassis manufacturer and an engine manufacturer by winning the 1952 24 Hours of Le Mans.
- McLaren completed the Triple Crown as both a team and chassis manufacturer by winning the 1995 24 Hours of Le Mans.
- Ford completed the Triple Crown only as an engine manufacturer by winning the 1968 Monaco Grand Prix.

Additionally, as an engine manufacturer only, Mercedes won the Indianapolis 500 in 1994, the 24 Hours of Le Mans in 1989 and the Monaco Grand Prix in 1998, 2000, 2002, 2005, 2007, 2008, 2009 and 2025.

Manufacturer	Indianapolis 500 winner	24 Hours of Le Mans winner	Monaco Grand Prix winner
(United Kingdom) McLaren	1972, 1974, 1976	**1995**	1984, 1985, 1986, 1988, 1989, 1990, 1991, 1992, 1993, 1998, 2000, 2002, 2005, 2007, 2008, 2025
(Germany) Mercedes	1915	**1952**	1935, 1936, 1937, 2013, 2014, 2015, 2016, 2019, 2026
(United States) Ford	1965–1967, 1969–1971, 1995–1996	1966–1969, 1975, 1980	**1968**, 1969, 1970, 1971, 1973, 1974, 1977, 1978, 1980, 1982, 1983, 1993, 1994

A pink background indicates a privately-run entry of a winning chassis manufacturer. A highlighting in bold indicates the Triple Crown completion.

== Active competitors who have completed two legs of the Triple Crown ==
As of February 2026, the only active drivers who have won two legs of the traditional Triple Crown are Juan Pablo Montoya and Fernando Alonso. Both have won the Monaco Grand Prix (Montoya in 2003, Alonso in 2006 and 2007), while Montoya has won the Indianapolis 500 twice (2000 and 2015) and Alonso has two overall wins for the 24 Hours of Le Mans (2018 and 2019).

For the alternative Triple Crown, the only active drivers who have won two legs are Jacques Villeneuve and Fernando Alonso. Villeneuve won the Indianapolis 500 in 1995 and was the F1 World Champion for 1997. Alonso was the F1 World Champion for 2005 and 2006, as well as the winner of the 24 Hours of Le Mans in 2018 and 2019.

Villeneuve has competed in the leading class at Le Mans twice with Peugeot in 2007 and 2008, his car retiring with mechanical failure in 2007 and finishing runner-up a year later. Montoya raced at Le Mans in 2018, 2020 and 2021 but only in the privateer LMP2 class, which is not expected to challenge for an overall win. Fernando Alonso, meanwhile, competed at the Indianapolis 500 in 2017, 2019 and 2020, his best position being 21st in 2020.

The drivers listed below have completed two of the three legs for either version of the Triple Crown.

Driver	Indianapolis 500 winner	24 Hours of Le Mans winner	Monaco Grand Prix winner	F1 World Champion
(Italy) Tazio Nuvolari	—	1933	1932	—N/a (Note: The Formula One World Championship wasn't founded until 1950, after Nuvolari's career had ended.)
(France) Maurice Trintignant	—	1954	1955, 1958	—
(United Kingdom) Mike Hawthorn	—	1955	—	1958
(United States) Phil Hill	—	1958, 1961, 1962	—	1961
(United States) A. J. Foyt	1961, 1964, 1967, 1977	1967	—	—
(New Zealand) Bruce McLaren	—	1966	1962	—
(United Kingdom) Jim Clark	1965	—	—	1963, 1965
(Austria) Jochen Rindt	—	1965	1970	1970
(United States) Mario Andretti	1969	— (Note: Mario Andretti won the WSC category at the 1995 24 Hours of Le Mans, but most sources only consider overall victory as being eligible for the Triple Crown.)	—	1978
(Brazil) Emerson Fittipaldi	1989, 1993	—	—	1972, 1974
(Canada) **Jacques Villeneuve**	1995	—	—	1997
(Colombia) **Juan Pablo Montoya**	2000, 2015	— (Note: Juan Pablo Montoya won the LMP2 Pro-Am category at the 2021 24 Hours of Le Mans, but most sources only consider overall victory as being eligible for the Triple Crown.)	2003	—
(Spain) **Fernando Alonso**	—	2018, 2019	2006, 2007	2005, 2006

Key: Active drivers are highlighted in bold.

== See also ==
- Triple Crown
- List of winners of Triple Crown of Motorsport races
