= Orion the Thanks =

Japanese Thoroughbred racehorse

Orion the Thanks オリオンザサンクス
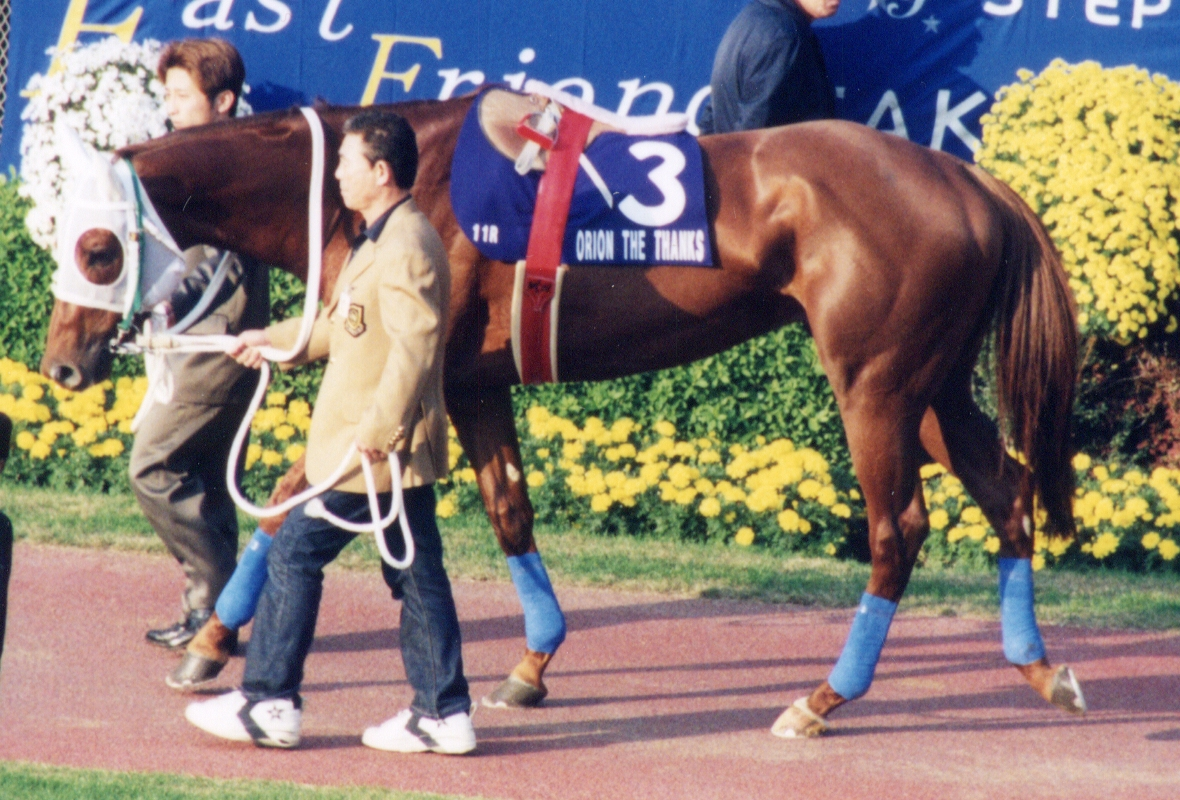
- Orion the Thanks on November 25, 2000, at Tokyo Racecourse.
- Breed: Thoroughbred
- Sire: Shanghai
- Grandsire: Procida
- Dam: Milano Collection
- Damsire: Rivlia
- Sex: Stallion
- Foaled: April 10, 1996
- Died: March 3, 2023
- Country: Japan
- Colour: Chestnut
- Owner: Keiko Hiura
- Racing colours
- Trainer: Kazunori Tanabe; Kiyomatsu Akama
- Jockey: Hideji Hayata
- Record: 24: 11-2-1
- Earnings: ¥272,910,000

Major wins
- Japan Dirt Classic (1999); Haneda Hai (1999); Tokyo Derby (1999)

Awards
- NAR Grand Prix Best 3-Year-Old Thoroughbred (1999)

Orion the Thanks (Japanese: オリオンザサンクス, Hepburn: Orion Za Sankusu; April 10, 1996 – March 3, 2023) was a Japanese racehorse and stallion.

His major victories included the 1999 Japan Dirt Derby (JpnI). That same year, he was selected as the NAR Best 3-Year-Old Thoroughbred.

== Racing career ==
=== 1998: three-year-old season (Note: Prior to Japan switching to the international age system for racehorses in 2001, they used an old age notation called "kazoedoshi", where all horses were considered to be one year old at birth.) ===
Orion the Thanks was trained by Kazunori Tabe at the Hokkaido Keiba circuit. He made his debut at Monbetsu Racecourse on April 15, 1998.

Following his debut victory, he contested several 1,000-meter open races at Asahikawa Racecourse, finishing seventh, second, and then going on to win the next two. In September, he contested contested in the Eikan Sho, taking first place and setting a 1,000-metre track record for the course, earning recognition as one of the most promising three-year-old horses in regional racing.

He concluded his Hokkaido campaign with four wins from six starts before transferring to the Akama Kiyomatsu stable at Ohi Racecourse. Following the transfer, he contested in the Zen-Nippon Sansai Yushun at Kawasaki Racecourse. He broke well and raced calmly, but tired out, and struggled to navigate after the final corner; despite having been voted 4th favourite to win, he finished in 10th place.

=== 1999: four-year-old season ===
Entering his four-year-old season in 1999, Orion Thanks began the year by winning the Wakajishi Tokubetsu, an open race. He lead throughout, relying on his early speed, defeating the runner-up, Reward Conga, by 1.5 seconds.

He followed this with a victory in the Keihin Hai in heavy snowfall, where he again took the lead early and held on to win. Following these performances, he was regarded as the leading contender for the 1999 Minami-Kanto Triple Crown (today's "Dirt Triple Crown"). He won the opening leg at the Haneda Hai, but was then beaten into third by his contemporaries, Opera Hat and Taikō Legend, in the second leg, the Tokyo Okan Sho. However, he would become a double crowner after winning the Tokyo Derby.

He participated in the inaugural Japan Dirt Derby, where he went off as the second favourite. It was expected that Opera Hat, the favourite, would win the race once again, giving his demonstrated high stamina on the final spurt. However, Orion the Thanks took the lead from the start and raced well, finishing first by a neck, becoming the first winner of the race.

Although the victory appeared to establish him as the leading four-year-old dirt horse of the season, his health subsequently declined. Unable to reproduce the speed that had characterized his earlier performances, he recorded a series of disappointing results. After returning in the autumn and having been voted favourite once more, he finished eleventh in the Super Championship.

=== 2000: five-year-old season ===
In 2000, Orion Thanks competed over a variety of distances as he attempted to establish himself in new areas, including participation in dirt Grade 1 races under the Japan Racing Association. In the Frontier Sprint Hai in Ohi Racecourse, he returned to sprint racing for the first time in a while, and won by coming from behind, rather than using his usual front-running tactics.

On 25 November, he was selected as the representative of regional racing for the inaugural Japan Cup Dirt (GI), held at Tokyo Racecourse and Japan's first international dirt race. He took the lead at a high pace from the start and attracted attention from the crowd, but faded in the latter stages and finished fifteenth. Although he was entered for the Tokyo Daishōten at the end of the year, he was excluded as a reserve entry and instead contested the Katsushima Open, which he won.

=== 2001 and retirement ===
In 2001, following the change in Japanese horse age notation, Orion Thanks began his season in the Tokyo City Hai, where he was sent off as the favourite but finished fifth. He then travelled to Saga Racecourse for the Saga Kinen, where he finished eleventh. Following the race, he was diagnosed with Tendonitis, and retired from racing.

== Racing Record ==
Orion the Thanks won 11 races out of 24 starts. This data is available on JBIS.

Date	Race	Class	Distance	Racecourse	Finish	Entry	Time	Jockey	Winner (2nd Place)
1998: Three-year-old season
April 15	Three-year-old debut		Dirt 1000m	Monbetsu	1st	8	1:02.2	Hiroki Shibuya	(Squall Chase)
June 17	Three-year-old OP	OP	Dirt 1000m	Sapporo	7th	1	1:02.5	Hiroki Shibuya	Dai Coaster
July 2	Three-year-old OP	OP	Dirt 1000m	Asahikawa	2nd	5	1:01.9	Hiroki Shibuya	Kamiwaza
July 29	Three-year-old OP	OP	Dirt 1000m	Asahikawa	1st	3	1:00.5	Hiroki Shibuya	(Morpheroy)
August 26	Three-year-old OP	OP	Dirt 1000m	Asahikawa	1st	5	1:01.6	Hiroki Shibuya	(Wonder Power)
September 23	Eikan Sho	H2 (Note: Classified as a local G2 in Hokkaido racing)	Dirt 1000m	Asahikawa	1st	6	0:59.9	Hiroki Shibuya	(Shinsei Raiden)
December 29	Zen-Nippon Sansai Yushun	G2	Dirt 1600m	Kawasaki	10th	13	1:45.2	Hideji Hayata	Admire Mambo
1999: Four-year-old season
January 19	Wakajishi Special	OP	Dirt 1700m	Ohi	1st	14	1:48.6	Hideji Hayata	(Reward Conga)
February 11	Keihin Cup	Jpn2	Dirt 1700m	Ohi	1st	10	1:48.0	Hideji Hayata	(Keishu Excel)
April 13	Haneda Hai	Jpn1	Dirt 1600m	Ohi	1st	10	1:41.3	Hideji Hayata	(Rabbit Symphony)
May 10	Tokyo Okan Sho	Jpn1	Dirt 1800m	Ohi	3rd	10	1:54.8	Hideji Hayata	Opera Hat
June 9	Tokyo Derby	Jpn1	Dirt 2000m	Ohi	1st	15	2:07.7	Hideji Hayata	(Taiko Legend)
July 8	Japan Dirt Classic	G1	Dirt 2000m	Ohi	1st	6	2:06.9	Hideji Hayata	(Opera Hat)
October 13	Super Championship	Jpn2	Dirt 2000m	Ohi	11th	3	2:16.3	Hideji Hayata	Ichiko Tamayuki
2000: Five-year-old season
February 20	February Stakes	G1	Dirt 1600m	Tokyo	15th	4	1:37.5	Hideji Hayata	Wing Arrow
March 22	Frontier Sprint Cup	Jpn3	Dirt 1200m	Ohi	1st	9	1:12.4	Hideji Hayata	(Dear Victory)
April 13	Mile Grand Prix	Jpn1	Dirt 1600m	Ohi	5th	11	1:41.2	Hideji Hayata	Intelli Power
June 22	Teio Sho	Jpn1	Dirt 2000m	Ohi	15th	6	2:10.5	Hideji Hayata	Fast Friend
September 27	Tokyo Cup	Jpn2	Dirt 1200m	Ohi	8th	10	1:12.5	Hideji Hayata	Belle-Ami Lord
October 31	Grand Champion 2000	Jpn1	Dirt 2000m	Ohi	2nd	10	2:06.2	Hideji Hayata	Makiba Sniper
November 25	Japan Cup Dirt	G1	Dirt 2100m	Tokyo	15th	3	2:13.9	Hideji Hayata	Wing Arrow
December 30	Katsushima Open	OP	Dirt 1600m	Ohi	1st	14	1:40.0	Hideji Hayata	(Zenno Motore)
2001: Six-year-old season
January 17	Tokyo City Cup	Jpn3	Dirt 1400m	Ohi	5th	12	1:25.5	Hideji Hayata	Surprise Power
February 12	Saga Kinen	Jpn3	Dirt 2000m	Saga	11th	8	2:13.7	Hideji Hayata	Mitsuaki Silence

== Pedigree ==
Pedigree of Orion the Thanks (JPN)
Sire Shanghai (USA) 1989	Procida (USA); 1981	Mr. Prospector	Raise a Native
Sire Shanghai (USA) 1989	Procida (USA); 1981	Mr. Prospector	Gold Digger
Sire Shanghai (USA) 1989	Procida (USA); 1981	With Distinction	Distinctive
Sire Shanghai (USA) 1989	Procida (USA); 1981	With Distinction	Carrie's Rough
Sire Shanghai (USA) 1989	Korveya (USA); 1982	Riverman	Never Bend
Sire Shanghai (USA) 1989	Korveya (USA); 1982	Riverman	River Lady
Sire Shanghai (USA) 1989	Korveya (USA); 1982	Konafa	Damascus
Sire Shanghai (USA) 1989	Korveya (USA); 1982	Konafa	Royal Statute
Dam Milano Collection (JPN) 1991	Rivlia (USA); 1982	Riverman	Never Bend
Dam Milano Collection (JPN) 1991	Rivlia (USA); 1982	Riverman	River Lady
Dam Milano Collection (JPN) 1991	Rivlia (USA); 1982	Dahlia	Vaguely Noble
Dam Milano Collection (JPN) 1991	Rivlia (USA); 1982	Dahlia	Charming Alibi
Dam Milano Collection (JPN) 1991	Fudo Gold (JPN); 1979	Mojabe	Swaps
Dam Milano Collection (JPN) 1991	Fudo Gold (JPN); 1979	Mojabe	Somebody Who
Dam Milano Collection (JPN) 1991	Fudo Gold (JPN); 1979	Countess Dress Up	Dress Up
Dam Milano Collection (JPN) 1991	Fudo Gold (JPN); 1979	Countess Dress Up	Countess Lautrec

Orion the Thanks was inbred 3 × 3 to Riverman, and 5 × 4 × 4 to Never Bend. He was also inbred 5 × 5 to Khaled, a St James's Palace Stakes winner, through Swaps and Dress up on his Dam's side. This information is available on netkeiba and JBIS.
