= Kabutoyama (horse) =

Japanese Thoroughbred racehorse (1930–1951)

Kabutoyama カブトヤマ
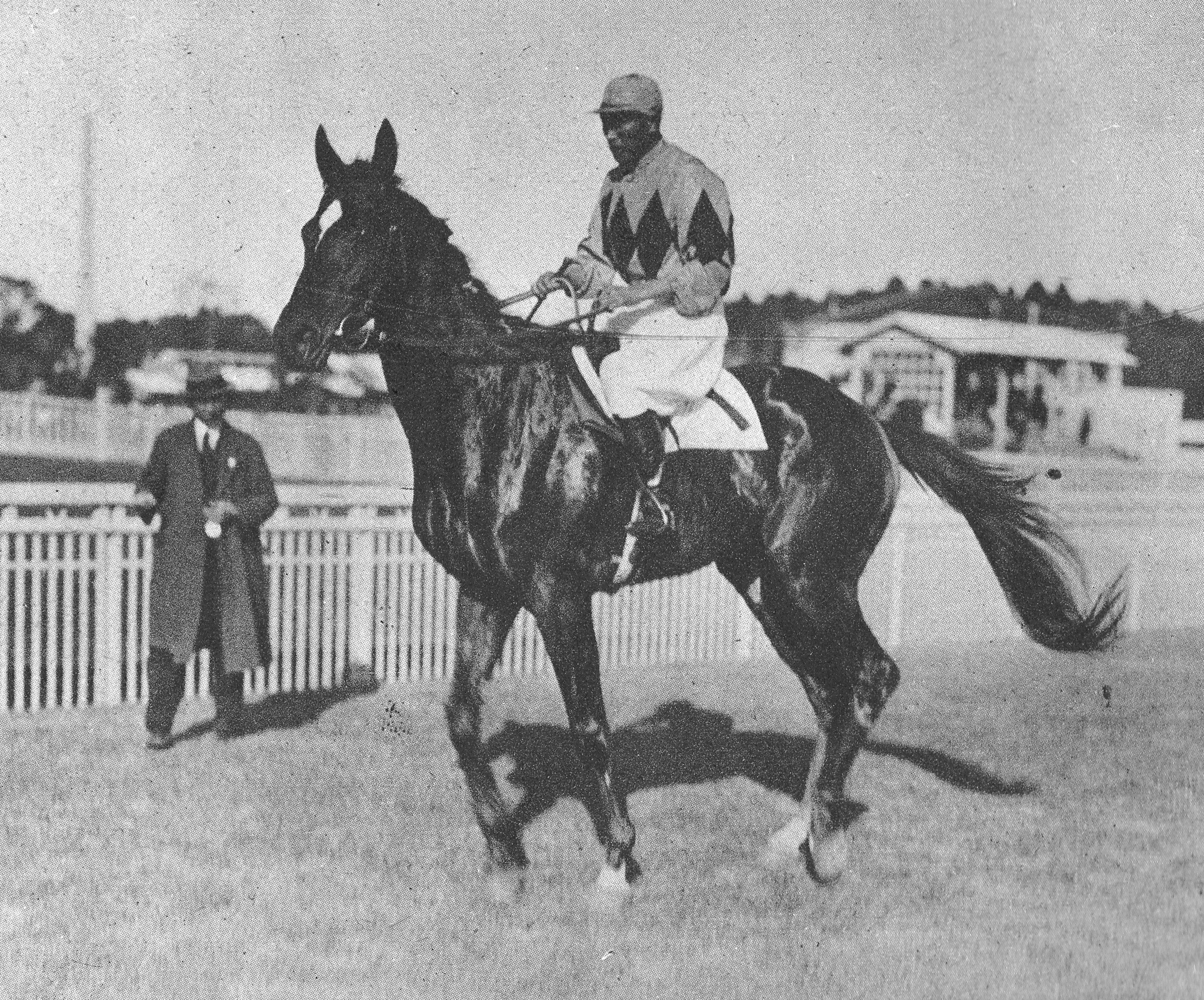
- Kabutoyama after winning the 1934 Meguro Kinen
- Breed: Thoroughbred
- Sire: Shian Mor
- Grandsire: Buchan
- Dam: Astral
- Damsire: Chapel Brampton
- Sex: Stallion
- Foaled: 5 March 1930
- Died: 13 August 1951 (aged 21); Shichinohe, Aomori, Japan
- Country: Japan
- Colour: Bay
- Breeder: Koiwai Farm
- Owner: Dohei Maekawa
- Trainer: Fusamatsu Okubo
- Jockey: Fusamatsu Okubo
- Record: 29: 12-7-6
- Earnings: ¥74,965

Major wins
- Tōkyō Yūshun (1933)

Kabutoyama (Japanese: カブトヤマ, Hepburn: Kabutoyama; 5 March 1930 – 13 August 1951) was a Japanese Thoroughbred racehorse and sire. He competed from 1933 to 1934, recording twelve wins in twenty-nine starts. He won the second running of the Tōkyō Yūshun Dai Kyoso (Japanese Derby) in 1933. He was sired by Shian Mor, a British-bred son of Buchan who had finished third in the Epsom Derby before being imported to Japan as a stallion at Koiwai Farm. His dam was Astral, a winner of the 1927 Tokyo Teishitsu Goshoten (Imperial Prize). His full brothers include Governor (Tōkyō Yūshun Dai Kyoso winner) and Rocky More (Teishitsu Goshoten winner).

== Background ==
Kabutoyama was a bay horse bred at Koiwai Farm in Shizukuishi, Iwate Prefecture. He was purchased for ¥20,150 at a yearling sale by Dohei Maekawa, the president of Isetan department store, and sent into training with Fusamatsu Okubo at the Meguro Racecourse. Okubo served as both trainer and jockey, riding Kabutoyama in all twenty-nine of his races.

== Racing career ==
=== 1933: three-year-old season ===
Kabutoyama debuted on March 25, 1933, at Nakayama Racecourse, winning a newcomer race on heavy ground by a neck. He finished third in a subsequent race before contesting the second Tōkyō Yūshun Dai Kyoso on April 30 at the Meguro Racecourse. Ridden by Okubo, he was positioned in a favourable position before accelerating in the straight to defeat Merry Utopia by four lengths.

He went on to win three more races in 1933, including the Shin Ko Oba (New/Old Colt) at Hanshin Racecourse and the Nosho (Agricultural Prize) at Hanshin, setting a course record in the latter.

=== 1934: four-year-old season ===
Kabutoyama won eight races in 1934, including the Fukushima Teishitsu Goshoten (Imperial Prize) at Fukushima Racecourse in June, the Meguro Kinen (Meguro Memorial) at Tokyo in November, and the Nakayama 5-Year-Old Tokubetsu at Nakayama in December. His retirement race was the Nakayama 5-Year-Old Tokubetsu on December 7, 1934, which he won by a large margin on heavy ground.

== Statistics ==
The following table details all 29 starts of Kabutoyama's racing career based on netkeiba and JBIS records. Times marked N/A were not recorded in available sources.

Date	Distance	Race	Course	Weight [kg]	Field	Finish	Time	Jockey	Winner (2nd Place)	Ref
1933 – three-year-old season
Mar 25	Turf 2000 m	Shin Ko	Nakayama	55	7	1st	2:11.2	Fusamatsu Okubo	(Asian Mor)	
Apr 3	Turf 2200 m	Yusho	Nakayama	55	7	3rd	N/A	Fusamatsu Okubo	Amor	
Apr 30	Turf 2400 m	Tōkyō Yūshun Dai Kyoso	Tokyo (Meguro)	55	19	1st	2:34.2	Fusamatsu Okubo	(Merry Utopia)	
Sep 27	Turf 2000 m	Ko Ko Tokubetsu Handicap	Hanshin	62	11	2nd	N/A	Fusamatsu Okubo	Etsu Fought	
Oct 1	Turf 2000 m	Shin Ko Oba	Hanshin	59	11	1st	2:08.4	Fusamatsu Okubo	(Asayasu)	
Oct 6	Turf 3200 m	Nosho	Hanshin	56	4	1st	R3:27.3	Fusamatsu Okubo	(Trustful)	
Oct 29	Turf 2000 m	Ko Ko Tokubetsu Handicap	Nakayama	59	12	4th	N/A	Fusamatsu Okubo	Hakusetsu	
Oct 30	Turf 2000 m	Ko Ba	Nakayama	63	5	2nd	N/A	Fusamatsu Okubo	Isahaya	
Nov 3	Turf 2400 m	Nakayama 4-Y-O Tokubetsu	Nakayama	63	10	4th	N/A	Fusamatsu Okubo	Red Sand	
Nov 26	Turf 1800 m	Shin Ko Ko Oba	Tokyo	63	15	Unplaced	N/A	Fusamatsu Okubo	Rock Light	
1934 – four-year-old season
Mar 23	Turf 2000 m	Tokubetsu Handicap	Nakayama	69	7	1st	2:06.3	Fusamatsu Okubo	(Taiho)	
Apr 1	Turf 2800 m	Nakayama Spring Tokubetsu	Nakayama	63	3	3rd	N/A	Fusamatsu Okubo	Wakamichi	
Apr 8	Turf 2600 m	Yusho	Nakayama	63	6	2nd	N/A	Fusamatsu Okubo	Taiho	
Apr 15	Turf 2000 m	Tokyo Teishitsu Goshoten	Tokyo	67	5	3rd	N/A	Fusamatsu Okubo	Miracle Utopia	
Apr 21	Turf 2400 m	5-Y-O Tokubetsu	Tokyo	66	4	3rd	N/A	Fusamatsu Okubo	Wakamichi	
Apr 27	Turf 1800 m	Shin Ko Ba Handicap	Tokyo	69	10	1st	1:54.4	Fusamatsu Okubo	(Rock Light)	
Apr 29	Turf 2600 m	Yusho	Tokyo	65	5	5th	N/A	Fusamatsu Okubo	Amor	
May 5	Turf 2000 m	Handicap	Yokohama	62	7	2nd	N/A	Fusamatsu Okubo	Taiho	
May 6	Turf 2000 m	Yokohama Teishitsu Goshoten	Yokohama	68	3	3rd	N/A	Fusamatsu Okubo	Taiho	
May 18	Turf 2200 m	Handicap	Yokohama	67	5	1st	2:22.2	Fusamatsu Okubo	(Red Sand)	
May 20	Turf 2600 m	Yusho	Yokohama	66	4	2nd	N/A	Fusamatsu Okubo	Denko	
Jun 18	Turf 1800 m	Fukushima Teishitsu Goshoten	Fukushima	58	9	1st	1:54.2	Fusamatsu Okubo	(Yae Hikari)	
Oct 20	Turf 2200 m	Handicap	Yokohama	68	11	2nd	N/A	Fusamatsu Okubo	Rairiki	
Oct 20	Turf 3200 m	Yokohama Tokubetsu	Yokohama	68	8	2nd	N/A	Fusamatsu Okubo	Hatsupy Land	
Nov 1	Turf 2000 m	Tokubetsu Handicap	Tokyo	69	7	1st	2:07.2	Fusamatsu Okubo	(Flame Mor)	
Nov 12	Turf 3400 m	Meguro Kinen	Tokyo	69	5	1st	3:44.1	Fusamatsu Okubo	(Rairiki)	
Nov 17	Turf 2400 m	5-Y-O Tokubetsu	Tokyo	72	4	1st	2:34.2	Fusamatsu Okubo	(Hatsupy Land)	
Nov 30	Turf 2000 m	Tokubetsu Handicap	Nakayama	68	5	3rd	N/A	Fusamatsu Okubo	Hatsupy Land	
Dec 7	Turf 3200 m	Nakayama 5-Y-O Tokubetsu	Nakayama	62	4	1st	3:37.2	Fusamatsu Okubo	(Hatsupy Land)	

== Stud career ==
Following his retirement, Kabutoyama became a stallion at Tohoku Bokujo (Northeast Farm) in Shichinohe, Aomori Prefecture. His first foals were born in 1936 and began racing in 1938. His most successful offspring was Mats Midori, who won the 1947 Tōkyō Yūshun (Japanese Derby), achieving the first father-son Derby victory in Japanese racing history. To commemorate this achievement, the Kabutoyama Kinen was established in 1947 as a graded stakes race for Japanese-bred horses; it was discontinued in 2003 after its original purpose of promoting domestic-bred stallions had been achieved, and was replaced by the Fukushima Himba Stakes. Kabutoyama died of old age on August 13, 1951, at the age of 21, and was buried at the Tohoku Bokujo Shichinohe branch.

== Pedigree ==
Pedigree of Kabutoyama (JPN)
Sire Shian Mor (GB) 1924	Buchan (GB); 1916	Sunstar	Sundridge
Sire Shian Mor (GB) 1924	Buchan (GB); 1916	Sunstar	Doris
Sire Shian Mor (GB) 1924	Buchan (GB); 1916	Hamoaze	Torpoint
Sire Shian Mor (GB) 1924	Buchan (GB); 1916	Hamoaze	Maid of the Mist
Sire Shian Mor (GB) 1924	Orlass (IRE); 1914	Orby	Orme
Sire Shian Mor (GB) 1924	Orlass (IRE); 1914	Orby	Rhoda B.
Sire Shian Mor (GB) 1924	Orlass (IRE); 1914	Simon Lass	Simmontault
Sire Shian Mor (GB) 1924	Orlass (IRE); 1914	Simon Lass	Kilkenny Lass
Dam Astral (JPN) 1921	Chapel Brampton (GB); 1912	Beppo	Marco
Dam Astral (JPN) 1921	Chapel Brampton (GB); 1912	Beppo	Pitti
Dam Astral (JPN) 1921	Chapel Brampton (GB); 1912	Mesquite	Sainfoin
Dam Astral (JPN) 1921	Chapel Brampton (GB); 1912	Mesquite	St. Silave
Dam Astral (JPN) 1921	Taneyoshi (JPN); 1912	Diamond Wedding	Diamond Jubilee
Dam Astral (JPN) 1921	Taneyoshi (JPN); 1912	Diamond Wedding	Wedlock
Dam Astral (JPN) 1921	Taneyoshi (JPN); 1912	Beautiful Dreamer	Euthusiast
Dam Astral (JPN) 1921	Taneyoshi (JPN); 1912	Beautiful Dreamer	Reposo

- Kabutoyama's sire Shian Mor finished third in the Epsom Derby before being imported to Japan.
- His grandsire Buchan won the Eclipse Stakes, Champion Stakes, and Doncaster Cup.
- His dam Astral won the 1927 Tokyo Teishitsu Goshoten (Imperial Prize).
- His full brothers Governor and Rocky More both won major races in Japan.

== See also ==
- Thoroughbred racing in Japan
- Tōkyō Yūshun
- Koiwai Farm
