= Hakuryo =

Japanese Thoroughbred racehorse (1950–1975)

- Hakuryo (right) with jockey Takao Yasuda
- Sire: Primero (GB)
- Grandsire: Blandford (GB)
- Dam: Dai-yon Buchanum Beauty (JPN)
- Damsire: Diolite (GB)
- Sex: Stallion
- Foaled: 6 May 1950
- Country: Japan
- Colour: Bay
- Breeder: Yashima Bokujo
- Owner: Hiroshi Nishi
- Trainer: Tokichi Ogata
- Jockey: Takao Yasuda; Toshio Nihonyanagi; Katsumi Yagisawa; Shuji Ito; Takeshi Takao; Akiyoshi Yamazaki
- Record: 25: 16-4-5
- Earnings: ¥10,093,200

Major wins
- Tenno Sho (Spring) (1954); Mainichi Okan (1954); Nakayama Kimpai (1955); Meguro Kinen (Spring) (1955); Japanese Classic Race wins: Kikuka-sho (1953)

Awards
- Japanese Horse of the Year (1954); Best Older Colt or Horse (1954)

Hakuryo (Japanese: ハクリヨウ, May 6, 1950 – September 4, 1975) was a Japanese Thoroughbred racehorse and sire. He won the 1953 Kikuka-sho and the 1954 Tenno Sho (Spring). In 1954, he received the Keishu-sha Award for Japanese Horse of the Year and Best Older Colt or Horse. After retiring, he stood as a stallion and sired 11 stakes winners, including two classic winners.

== Background ==
Hakuryo was foaled on May 6, 1950, at Morita Farm in Aomori Prefecture, where his dam had been sent from Yashima Bokujo. His childhood name was Yashima Beauty. He was sired by Primero, and his dam was Dai-yon Buchanum Beauty, a daughter of Diolite. His full siblings included New Moana, who won the 1952 Mainichi Okan, and Shirahata, who won the Fukushima Kinen and later became the dam of Meiji Hikari. Among his contemporaries bred at Yashima Bokujo were Bostonian and Tokitsu.

Hakuryo was purchased by Hiroshi Nishi and trained by Tokichi Ogata. The name "Hakuryo" is derived from a fisherman in the Noh play Hagoromo. He measured 172 cm in height and 194 cm in girth, which was large for a Japanese racehorse of the 1950s. This build contributed to chronic quarter cracks that affected him throughout his career.

== Racing career ==
=== 1952–1953: Early career ===
Hakuryo debuted on November 8, 1952, at Tokyo Racecourse, finishing third after being promoted from fourth due to the disqualification of Hatakaze. Hoof problems delayed his next starts until March 1953, when he won a maiden race. In the spring, he contested the Japanese Triple Crown races, finishing second to Bostonian in the Satsuki Sho and the NHK Hai, and third behind Bostonian in the Tokyo Yushun (Japanese Derby).

During the summer, he won four open-class races, including the Nakayama Yonsai Stakes in a course record time of 2:06.1. In the autumn, he lost to Bostonian in a Kyoto open race but won the Kikuka-sho on November 23. Ridden by Takao Yasuda, Hakuryo took the lead at the third corner and defeated Bostonian by three and a half lengths, preventing him from winning the Triple Crown.

=== 1954–1955: Older horse career ===
In 1954, Hakuryo was undefeated in five starts. His victories included the Tenno Sho (Spring), where he defeated Bostonian by six lengths, and the Mainichi Okan, which he won by four lengths over Cheerio, Bostonian, and Takao. Following the Mainichi Okan, he received an invitation to run in the Washington, D.C. International Stakes in the United States, becoming the first Japanese-trained horse to receive such an invitation. The owner accepted, and the horse was transported to Haneda Airport, but the overseas trip was cancelled because his large size made air transport unfeasible and sea transport was considered detrimental to his condition.

In January 1955, he was named Japanese Horse of the Year and Best Older Colt or Horse, defeating Dainana Hoshu in the voting. He also received the Tokyo Racing Journalists Club Award. He returned to racing in 1955, winning the Nakayama Kimpai and the Meguro Kinen (Spring). He finished third in an open race in July while carrying 69 kg, after which he was retired.

== Statistics ==
The following table details all 25 starts of Hakuryo's racing career based on official JRA historical records.

Date	Distance (Condition)	Race	Class	Course	Odds (Favourite)	Field	Finish	Time	Winning (Losing) Margin	Winner (2nd Place)	Jockey	Ref
1952 – two-year-old season
Nov 8	Turf 1000 m (Good)	Newcomer	Maiden	Tokyo	N/A	7	3rd	N/A	N/A	Tokitsu	Takao Yasuda	
1953 – three-year-old season
Mar 8	Turf 1200 m (Good)	5-Man Shita	Allowance	Tokyo	N/A	13	1st	R1:17.2	–Nose	(Daiwa)	Takao Yasuda	
Mar 21	Turf 1600 m (Good)	4-Y-O Special	Allowance	Tokyo	N/A	9	3rd	N/A	N/A	Tokitsu	Takao Yasuda	
Apr 5	Turf 1800 m (Soft)	20-Man Shita	Allowance	Nakayama	N/A	8	1st	R1:58.1	–5	(Tenou Musashi)	Toshio Nihonyanagi	
Apr 26	Turf 2000 m (Good)	Satsuki Sho	GI	Nakayama	N/A	17	2nd	N/A	1	Bostonian	Toshio Nihonyanagi	
May 10	Turf 2000 m (Good)	NHK Hai	Open	Tokyo	N/A	10	2nd	N/A	3.5	Bostonian	Toshio Nihonyanagi	
May 24	Turf 2400 m (Heavy)	Tokyo Yushun	GI	Tokyo	N/A	33	3rd	N/A	N/A	Bostonian	Toshio Nihonyanagi	
May 30	Turf 1800 m (Good)	Open	Open	Tokyo	N/A	5	1st	R1:55.3	–8	(Queen Suess)	Takao Yasuda	
Jun 14	Turf 1600 m (Good)	Yasuda Sho	Open	Tokyo	N/A	9	3rd	N/A	N/A	Swee Sue	Katsumi Yagisawa	
Jun 21	Turf 1800 m (Good)	Special Handicap	Open	Nakayama	N/A	6	2nd	N/A	Nose	Kiyostrong	Takao Yasuda	
Jul 5	Turf 2000 m (Soft)	Nakayama Yonsai S	Open	Nakayama	N/A	7	1st	R2:06.1	–3	(Hatao)	Toshio Nihonyanagi	
Sep 23	Turf 1800 m (Good)	Open	Open	Tokyo	N/A	7	1st	R1:52.0	–2.5	(Fuso)	Takao Yasuda	
Oct 10	Turf 1800 m (Soft)	Open	Open	Nakayama	N/A	6	1st	R1:54.4	–8	(Kaneharu)	Takao Yasuda	
Oct 18	Turf 2000 m (Good)	Kabutoyama Kinen	Open	Nakayama	N/A	8	1st	R2:05.0	–5	(Minenosugata)	Takao Yasuda	
Nov 14	Turf 2000 m (Good)	Open	Open	Kyoto	N/A	7	2nd	N/A	1.5	Bostonian	Shuji Ito	
Nov 23	Turf 3000 m (Good)	Kikuka-sho	GI	Kyoto	N/A	8	1st	R3:09.1	–3.5	(Bostonian)	Takao Yasuda	
1954 – four-year-old season
Mar 14	Turf 1800 m (Good)	Special Handicap	Open	Tokyo	N/A	11	1st	R1:51.0	–2	(Fuso)	Takao Yasuda	
Mar 28	Turf 2400 m (Good)	Tokyo Hai	Open	Tokyo	N/A	5	1st	R2:30.2	–5	(Takahata)	Takao Yasuda	
May 8	Turf 2000 m (Good)	Open	Open	Kyoto	N/A	4	1st	R2:05.0	–9	(Daisan Hoshu)	Takeshi Takao	
May 16	Turf 3200 m (Good)	Tenno Sho (Spring)	GI	Kyoto	N/A	6	1st	R3:24.2	–6	(Bostonian)	Takao Yasuda	
Oct 3	Turf 2500 m (Good)	Mainichi Okan	Open	Tokyo	N/A	5	1st	R2:35.2	–4	Cheerio	Takao Yasuda	
1955 – five-year-old season
Jan 16	Turf 2600 m (Good)	Nakayama Kimpai	Open	Tokyo	N/A	10	1st	R2:45.2	–2.5	(Takao)	Takao Yasuda	
Mar 27	Turf 2500 m (Soft)	Meguro Kinen (Spring)	Open	Tokyo	N/A	4	1st	R2:40.4	–0.75	(Kane Eikan)	Takao Yasuda	
Jul 10	Turf 1700 m (Good)	Open	Open	Nakayama	N/A	7	3rd	N/A	N/A	Masahata	Akiyoshi Yamazaki	

- Note: "R" in the Time column indicates a course record. Exact decimal odds were not systematically recorded for JRA races in the early 1950s; "N/A" denotes historically unavailable metrics.

== Notable progeny ==
- 1957 crop
  - Caesar – Takarazuka Kinen, Asahi Challenge Cup, Naruo Kinen, Chukyo Kinen, Hankyu Hai, Meguro Kinen (Spring), Swan Stakes
  - Kusanagi – Chukyo Kinen
- 1959 crop
  - Yamano O – Satsuki Sho, Mainichi Okan, Diamond Stakes, Yasuda Kinen, Nikkei Sho
  - Toast – Nakayama Kinen, Mainichi Okan, Nakayama Kimpai, Argentine Jockey Club Cup
- 1960 crop
  - Chitose River – Kyoto Yonsai Tokubetsu
  - Chiest O – NTV Hai
- 1962 crop
  - Houran – Nakayama Daishogai (Autumn)
  - Kitashinzan – Hanshin Shogai Stakes (Spring)
- 1963 crop
  - Marufubuki – Niigata Kinen
- 1964 crop
  - Sea Ace – Oka Sho
  - New Onward – American Jockey Club Cup, Stayers Stakes

=== Broodmare sire progeny ===
- Hikaru Takai (1964, by Limbo) – Tenno Sho (Spring)
- Inter Hikari (1966, by Garcent) – Best Steeplechaser (1971)
  - Barone Turf (1972, by Bounteous) – Best Steeplechaser (1977–1979)
- Lucky Ruler (1974, by Stupendous) – Tokyo Yushun
- Dokan Jo (1984, by Tosho Boy) – Best Two-Year-Old Filly (1986)

== Stud career and evaluation ==
Hakuryo stood at Wakakusa Farm in Hokkaido for three years before moving to the Urakawa Stallion Station. During this period, domestic stallions were generally less favored due to the influx of foreign imports, but Hakuryo sired multiple stakes winners. He ranked in the top ten of the Japanese general sire list seven times, peaking at fourth in 1964. He died of old age on September 4, 1975, at the age of 25, and was buried at Urakawa Minota Farm.

Jockey Takao Yasuda, who rode both Hakuryo and Hakuchikara, stated that Hakuryo possessed more speed and power than Hakuchikara, and that his front-running style would have been suited to American racing. Trainer Tokichi Ogata noted that few horses of the era matched Hakuryo's physical build. Hiroshi Nishi's wife later stated that Nishi had originally intended to send Hakuryo, rather than Hakuchikara, to compete in the United States.

== Pedigree ==
Pedigree of Hakuryo (JPN)
Sire Primero (GB) 1931	Blandford (GB) 1919	Swynford (GB)	John O'Gaunt (GB)
Sire Primero (GB) 1931	Blandford (GB) 1919	Swynford (GB)	Canterbury Pilgrim (GB)
Sire Primero (GB) 1931	Blandford (GB) 1919	Blanche (GB)	White Eagle (GB)
Sire Primero (GB) 1931	Blandford (GB) 1919	Blanche (GB)	Black Cherry (GB)
Sire Primero (GB) 1931	Athasi (IRE) 1917	Farasi (GB)	Desmond (GB)
Sire Primero (GB) 1931	Athasi (IRE) 1917	Farasi (GB)	Molly Morgan (GB)
Sire Primero (GB) 1931	Athasi (IRE) 1917	Athgreany (GB)	Galloping Simon (GB)
Sire Primero (GB) 1931	Athasi (IRE) 1917	Athgreany (GB)	Fairyland (GB)
Dam Dai-yon Buchanum Beauty (JPN) 1930	Diolite (GB) 1927	Diophon (GB)	Grand Parade (GB)
Dam Dai-yon Buchanum Beauty (JPN) 1930	Diolite (GB) 1927	Diophon (GB)	Donnetta (GB)
Dam Dai-yon Buchanum Beauty (JPN) 1930	Diolite (GB) 1927	Needle Rock (GB)	Rock Sand (GB)
Dam Dai-yon Buchanum Beauty (JPN) 1930	Diolite (GB) 1927	Needle Rock (GB)	Needle Point (GB)
Dam Dai-yon Buchanum Beauty (JPN) 1930	Buchanum Beauty (JPN) 1929	Shian Mor (GB)	Buchan (GB)
Dam Dai-yon Buchanum Beauty (JPN) 1930	Buchanum Beauty (JPN) 1929	Shian Mor (GB)	Orlass (GB)
Dam Dai-yon Buchanum Beauty (JPN) 1930	Buchanum Beauty (JPN) 1929	Dai-san Beautiful Dreamer (JPN)	Intagliore (GB)
Dam Dai-yon Buchanum Beauty (JPN) 1930	Buchanum Beauty (JPN) 1929	Dai-san Beautiful Dreamer (JPN)	Beautiful Dreamer (GB)

== See also ==
- Thoroughbred racing in Japan
