= Finger (horse) =

Japanese Thoroughbred racehorse

Finger フィンガー
- Breed: Thoroughbred
- Sire: Gun Runner
- Grandsire: Candy Ride
- Dam: Estilo Talentoso
- Damsire: Maclean's Music
- Sex: Stallion
- Foaled: February 18, 2023
- Country: Japan
- Colour: Bay
- Breeder: Takahashi Farm
- Owner: M's Racing
- Racing colours
- Trainer: Hiroyasu Tanaka
- Jockey: Keita Tosaki
- Record: 10: 4-4-0
- Earnings: 207,800,000 JPY (JRA) 194,500,000 JPY (NAR)

Major wins
- Haneda Hai (2026); Tokyo Derby (2026)
- Last updated on June 29, 2026

Finger (Japanese: フィンガー, Hepburn: Fingā; foaled February 18, 2023) is a Japanese Thoroughbred Racehorse. His major victories include the 2026 Haneda Hai and Tokyo Derby.

== Racing career ==
=== 2-year-old season (2025) ===
Finger made his debut in the 2025 1,800 meter maiden race for 2-year-olds on the dirt track at Nakayama Racecourse, ridden by Keita Tosaki. Going off as the second favorite, he was overtaken by Kenton in the final stretch and finished a close second. He ran two more maiden races that same year, both in November, and both 1,600 meters on the dirt track at Tokyo Racecourse, but finished second in both.

=== 3-year-old season (2026) ===
On January 4, 2026, he returned to Nakayama, this time running in a maiden race for 3-year-olds. He delivered a decisive victory, breaking sharply from the start to take the lead, and maintaining his speed throughout the race, and winning by over ten lengths. On January 21, Finger competed in the Bluebird Cup, a domestic grade 3 race restricted to three-year-old horses, held at Funabashi Racecourse. Despite this being his first attempt at a graded stakes race and a short time after his successful maiden race, he ran well. Finger settled onto 3rd place on the outside during the mid-race, pushing ahead on the third turn, winning by a length and a half.

On March 25, 2026, he competed in the Keihan Hai, a grade 2 race and a trial race for the Haneda Hai, the first leg for Japan's Dirt Triple Crown. He finished in second place, three lengths behind Rock Ptarmigan.

Finishing second guaranteed him priority entry rights to the Haneda Hai on April 29, 2026, where he went off as the third favorite. He broke well, and took the lead near the first turn. Realize Glint and Rock Ptarmigan challenged for the lead several times, but failed to catch up to Finger. He finished first by three lengths.

In his post-race comments, jockey Tosaki said, "Trainer Hiroyasu Tanaka and I made a plan before the race. We thought we would try to race near the front. I was able to take the lead, but I wondered if I had slowed the pace down too much. I think Finger has improved compared to the previous race." Regarding the possibility of winning the Dirt Triple Crown, he said, "Since we were able to win one of the classics, I think he will continue to attract attention from here on, and I hope everyone will support him. We were able to show Finger's strength, and I think we can look forward to his future success as well."

On June 10, he participated in the Tokyo Derby, the second leg of the Dirt Triple Crown. Just like in his previous race, he took the lead and set the pace. Although Rock Ptarmigan briefly overtook him just before the final turn, he reclaimed the lead, and went on to win by a length, achieving his second consecutive crown.

On June 25, it was announced that Finger would aim for the Pacific Classic Stakes, to be held at Del Mar Racetrack on August 22, which would be his first overseas campaign. It was explained that, based on the result of that race, they would consider whether to proceed to the Breeders' Cup Classic.

He arrived at Del Mar on August 16, less than a full week before the race. During the race, he botched the start and settled in mid pack. Full Serrano and Knightsbridge—who ran nose to nose throughout the race—set a rapid pace, with the initial quarter mile being covered in 22.68 seconds. Finger made several attempts to better his position, but was pushed back and continued to lose his strength. On the third corner he began to slow down, falling further back and finishing last, in 11th place.

Once he returned to Japan to complete the third leg of the dirt triple crown, Japan Dirt Classic, he had a poor workout leading up to the race as he finished two lengths behind his training mate. With a new jockey in Ryusei Sakai, Finger who raced as the fifth favourite led the race from the start but fell once reaching the homestretch to finish in ninth.

== Racing record ==
Finger has won four races out of ten starts. The following racing form is based on information available on netkeiba.com and JBIS-Search.

Date	Distance (Condition)	Race	Class	Course	Field	HN	Odds (Favored)	Finish	Time	Winning (Losing) Margin	Jockey	Winner (2nd Place)
2025 – two-year-old season
Sep 27	Dirt 1,800 m (Fast)	Two Year Old Debut		Nakayama	16	10	7.2 (3rd)	2nd	1:56.0	(2 lengths)	Keita Tosaki	Kenton
Nov 9	Dirt 1,600 m (Good)	Two Year Old Maiden		Tokyo	16	2	6.4 (3rd)	2nd	1:37.6	(neck)	Keita Tosaki	Saint Lazare
Nov 24	Dirt 1,600 m (Fast)	Two Year Old Maiden		Tokyo	14	6	1.5 (1st)	2nd	1:37.6	(3 lengths)	Keita Tosaki	Mac Lir
2026 – three-year-old season
Jan 4	Dirt 1,800 m (Good)	Three Year Old Maiden		Nakayama	13	4	1.3 (1st)	1st	1:54.5	10+ lengths	Keita Tosaki	(Nishino Morimichi)
Jan 21	Dirt 1,800 m (Fast)	Bluebird Cup	JpnIII (Note: All Jpn graded races are considered Listed internationally.)	Funabashi	13	13	1.8 (1st)	1st	1:55.4	1 1/2 lengths	Keita Tosaki	(Katarite)
Mar 25	Dirt 1,700 m (Good)	Keihan Hai	JpnII	Oi	7	1	2.4 (1st)	2nd	1:46.8	(3 lengths)	Keita Tosaki	Rock Ptarmigan
Apr 29	Dirt 1,800 m (Good)	Haneda Hai	JpnI	Oi	13	11	4.2 (3rd)	1st	1:52.7	3 lengths	Keita Tosaki	(Rock Ptarmigan)
Jun 10	Dirt 2,000 m (Muddy)	Tokyo Derby	JpnI	Oi	16	12	2.8 (2nd)	1st	2:04.4	1 1/4 lengths	Keita Tosaki	(Silver Ratio)
Aug 23	Dirt 2,000 m (Fast)	Pacific Classic Stakes	GI	Del Mar	11	3	7.7 (3rd)	11th	2:07.78	(29 1/2 lengths)	Keita Tosaki	Knightsbridge
Oct 7	Dirt 2,000 m (Fast)	Japan Dirt Classic	JpnI	Oi	16	10	8.0 (5th)	9th	2:07.0	(15 lengths)	Ryusei Sakai	Silver Ratio

== Pedigree ==
Pedigree of Finger (JPN)
Sire Gun Runner 2013	Candy Ride; 1999	Ride the Rails	Cryptoclearance
Sire Gun Runner 2013	Candy Ride; 1999	Ride the Rails	Herbalesian
Sire Gun Runner 2013	Candy Ride; 1999	Bramalea	Candy Stripes
Sire Gun Runner 2013	Candy Ride; 1999	Bramalea	City Girl
Sire Gun Runner 2013	Quiet Giant; 2007	Giant's Causeway	Storm Cat
Sire Gun Runner 2013	Quiet Giant; 2007	Giant's Causeway	Mariah's Storm
Sire Gun Runner 2013	Quiet Giant; 2007	Quiet Dance	Quiet American*
Sire Gun Runner 2013	Quiet Giant; 2007	Quiet Dance	Misty Dancer
Dam Estilo Talentoso 2017	Maclean's Music; 2008	Distorted Humor	Forty Niner
Dam Estilo Talentoso 2017	Maclean's Music; 2008	Distorted Humor	Danzig's Beauty
Dam Estilo Talentoso 2017	Maclean's Music; 2008	Forest Music	Unbridled's Song
Dam Estilo Talentoso 2017	Maclean's Music; 2008	Forest Music	Defer West
Dam Estilo Talentoso 2017	Bazinga Baby; 2012	Afleet Alex	Northern Afleet
Dam Estilo Talentoso 2017	Bazinga Baby; 2012	Afleet Alex	Maggy Hawk
Dam Estilo Talentoso 2017	Bazinga Baby; 2012	Elizaveta	Quiet American*
Dam Estilo Talentoso 2017	Bazinga Baby; 2012	Elizaveta	Carezza

Finger is inbred 4x4 to Quiet American, and 5x5x5 to Fappiano.
