= Kizuna (horse) =

Japanese-bred Thoroughbred racehorse

Kizuna キズナ
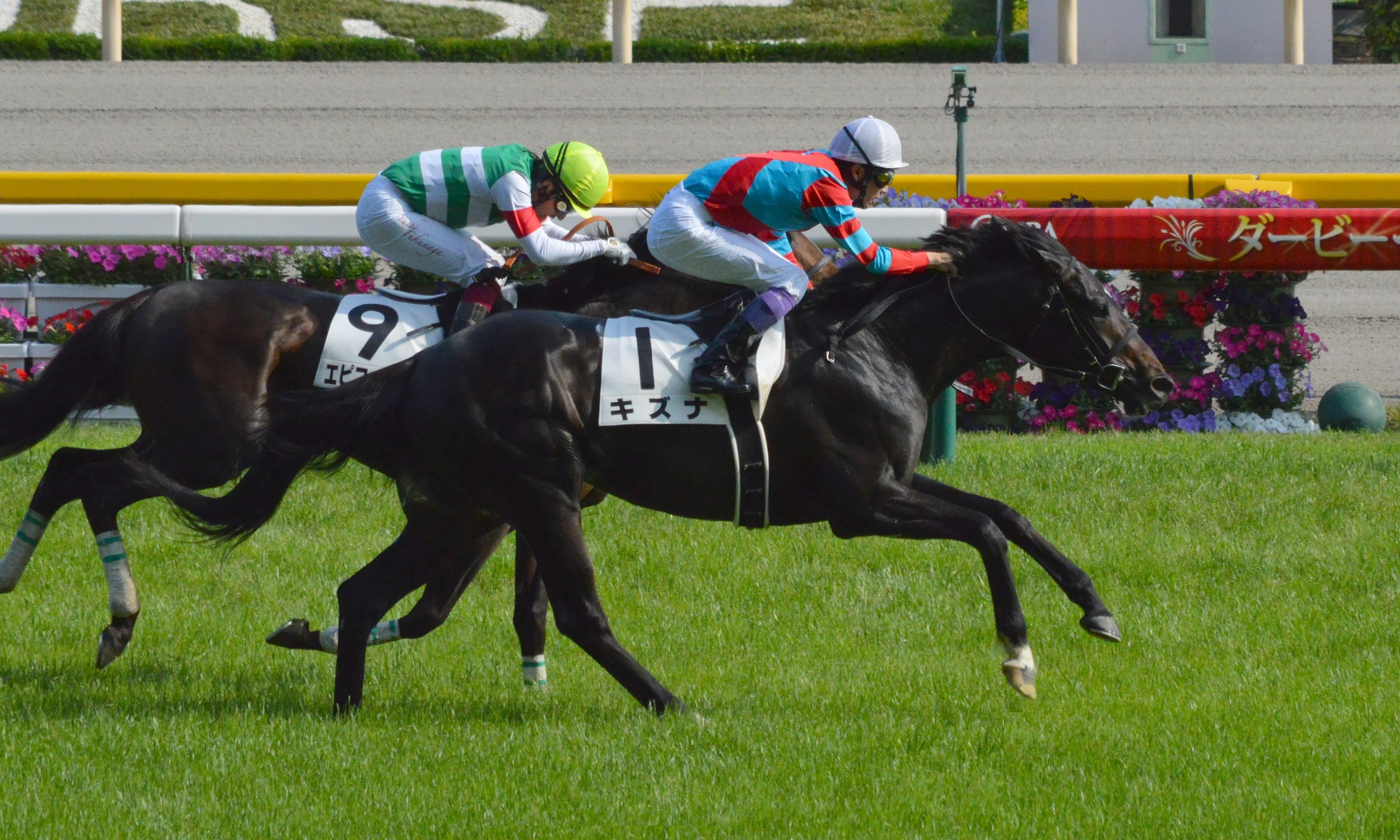
- Kizuna racing at the 2013 Tokyo Yushun.
- Breed: Thoroughbred
- Sire: Deep Impact
- Grandsire: Sunday Silence
- Dam: Catequil
- Damsire: Storm Cat
- Sex: Stallion
- Foaled: 5 March 2010
- Country: Japan
- Colour: Brown
- Breeder: North Hills Co Ltd
- Owner: Shinji Maeda
- Racing colours
- Trainer: Shozo Sasaki
- Jockey: Yutaka Take
- Record: 14: 7-1-2
- Earnings: Japan: ¥476,399,000; France: €348,180

Major wins
- Mainichi Hai (2013); Kyoto Shimbun Hai (2013); Prix Niel (2013); Sankei Osaka Hai (2014); Japanese Classic Race wins: Tokyo Yushun (2013)

Awards
- JRA Award for Best Three-Year-Old Colt (2013); Leading sire in Japan (2024, 2025)

Kizuna (Japanese: キズナ, Hepburn: Kizuna; foaled 5 March 2010) is a Japanese Thoroughbred racehorse who won the Tokyo Yushun in 2013.

== Background ==
Kizuna is a brown horse with a small white star and white socks on his hind legs, bred in Japan by the North Hills Co Ltd. He was sired by the outstanding Japanese racehorse Deep Impact out of the Canadian-bred mare Catequil. Deep Impact was the Japanese Horse of the Year in 2005 and 2006, winning races including the Tokyo Yushun, Tenno Sho, Arima Kinen and Japan Cup. Catequil had previously produced the Japanese champion filly Phalaenopsis. She was also a half-sister of Pacificus, the dam of Narita Brian and Biwa Hayahide, both of whom were named Japanese Horse of the Year.

Koji Maeda, head of North Hills, named the horse Kizuna, which is a Japanese word meaning "bond", after he was touched by the warm words he was given by others around him when he was visiting Dubai for the 2011 Dubai World Cup that was held two weeks after the 2011 Tohoku Earthquake, which coincided with Kizuna just turning 1 year old.

== Racing career ==
=== 2012: two-year-old season ===
Kizuna began his racing career on 7 October 2012 when he won a race for newcomers over 1800 metres at Kyoto Racecourse. He won another race over the same course and distance on 11 November. The colt was then moved up in class for the Grade 3 Radio Nikkei Hai Nisai Stake over 2000 metres at Hanshin Racecourse, where he finished third, beaten half a length and a neck by Epiphaneia and Bad Boy.

=== 2013: three-year-old season ===
Kizuna made his three-year-old debut in the Grade 2 Hochi Hai Yayoi Sho at Nakayama Racecourse on 3 March. In a blanket finish, he took fifth place in a field of twelve runners, less than three-quarters of a length behind the winner Camino Tassajara. Three weeks later, Kizuna started the 1/2 favourite for the Grade 3 Mainichi Hai at Hanshin. Ridden by Yutaka Take, he won by three lengths from Geyersworth, with Bad Boy three and a half lengths back in third. Despite being eligible the Satsuki Sho, the first leg of Japanese Triple Crown, Kizuna's connection decided not to field him in the race, but to focus on the Tokyo Yūshun, the Japanese derby.

On 4 May Kizuna entered one of the preparation races, the Kyoto Shimbun Hai over 2200 metres at Kyoto. He started the 2/5 favourite and won by one and a half lengths from Peptide Amazon. Kizuna was one of eighteen colts to contest the 80th running of the Tokyo Yūshun at Tokyo Racecourse and started the 19/10 favourite ahead of the Satsuki Sho winner Logotype. Take produced the colt with a strong late run on the outside to take the lead in the final strides and win by half a length from Epiphaneia in a time of 2:24.6.

Kizuna was sent to Europe in the autumn of 2013 to be prepared for a run the Prix de l'Arc de Triomphe. On 15 September he contested the Prix Niel at Longchamp Racecourse in Paris where he faced a strong field of European colts including The Derby winner Ruler of the World and the Grand Prix de Paris winner Flintshire. Take restrained the colt towards the back of the field before making his challenge on the outside in the straight. He took the lead inside the last 100 metres and held off the late challenge of Ruler of the World to win by a head. After the race Kizuna's trainer Shozo Sasaki said "This was his first run abroad so I'm very pleased. He was about 80% compared with the Japanese Derby, so we will work hard to get the final 20% before the Arc." On 6 October started the third favourite in a field of seventeen runners in the Arc de Triomphe. Date held the colt up at the back of the field before moving up on the outside approaching the turn into the straight. He stayed on well in the closing stages to finish fourth behind Treve, Orfevre and Intello.

In January 2014 Kizuna won the JRA Award for Best Three-Year-Old Colt taking 238 of the 280 votes.

=== 2014: four-year-old season ===
Kizuna began his third season with an easy win in the Grade 2 Sankei Osaka Hai at Hanshin on 6 April. On 4 May Kizuna started 7/10 favourite for the two-mile Tenno Sho at Kyoto. He was held up at the back of the eighteen runner field before switching to the wide outside in the straight. He finished strongly, but was unable to catch the leaders and finished fourth behind Fenomeno, Win Variation and Hokko Brave. Shortly after the race, it was announced that Kizuna had sustained a small fracture to his left hind leg and would be off the track for most of the year. Sasaki suggested that his next run might be the Arima Kinen in December.

=== 2015: five-year-old season ===
After a nine-month absence, Kizuna returned in the Grade 2 Kyoto Kinen on 15 February 2015 and finished third, beaten a nose and a neck by Lovely Day and Suzuka Devious with Harp Star in fifth. In April he started odds-on favourite for the Sankei Osaka Hai but was beaten into second place by the five-year-old mare Lachesis. On 3 May Kizuna was made the 2.3/1 favourite for the Tennō Shō but finished seventh of the seventeen runners behind Gold Ship. He was retired from racing after sustaining a training injury in September 2015.

== Racing form ==
Kizuna won seven races and placed in another three out of 14 starts. This data is available in JBIS, netkeiba and racingpost.

Date	Track	Race	Grade	Distance (Condition)	Entry	HN	Odds (Favored)	Finish	Time	Margins	Jockey	Winner (Runner-up)
2012 – two-year-old season
Oct 7	Kyoto	2yo Newcomer		1,800 m (Firm)	7	5	2.0 (1)	1st	1:51.6	–0.3	Tetsuzo Sato	(Regeneration)
Nov 11	Kyoto	Kigiku Sho	ALW (1W)	1,800 m (Good)	10	4	2.0 (1)	1st	1:49.8	–0.6	Tetsuzo Sato	(Tosen Powerful)
Dec 22	Hanshin	Radio Nikkei Hai Nisai Stakes	3	2,000 m (Good)	7	6	2.9 (2)	3rd	2:05.5	0.1	Yutaka Take	Epiphaneia
2013 – three-year-old season
Mar 3	Nakayama	Yayoi Sho	2	2,000 m (Firm)	12	6	6.4 (3)	5th	2:01.1	0.1	Yutaka Take	Camino Tassajara
Mar 23	Hanshin	Mainichi Hai	3	1,800 m (Firm)	13	6	1.5 (1)	1st	1:46.2	–0.5	Yutaka Take	(Geyersworth)
May 4	Kyoto	Kyoto Shimbun Hai	3	2,200 m (Firm)	16	5	1.4 (1)	1st	2:12.3	–0.2	Yutaka Take	(Peptide Amazon)
May 26	Tokyo	Tokyo Yushun	1	2,400 m (Firm)	18	1	2.9 (1)	1st	2:24.3	–0.1	Yutaka Take	(Epiphaneia)
Sep 15	Longchamp	Prix Niel	2	2,400 m (Soft)	10	8	6/1 (5)	1st	2:37.6	0.0	Yutaka Take	(Ruler Of The World)
Oct 6	Longchamp	Prix de l'Arc de Triomphe	1	2,400 m (Soft)	17	14	7/1 (3)	4th	2:33.4	1.4	Yutaka Take	Treve
2014 – four-year-old season
Apr 6	Hanshin	Sankei Osaka Hai	2	2,000 m (Firm)	8	7	2.4 (2)	1st	2:00.3	–0.2	Yutaka Take	(Tokai Paradise)
May 4	Kyoto	Tenno Sho (Spring)	1	3,200 m (Firm)	18	14	1.7 (1)	4th	3:15.2	0.1	Yutaka Take	Fenomeno
2015 – five-year-old season
Feb 15	Kyoto	Kyoto Kinen	2	2,200 m (Firm)	11	4	2.3 (2)	3rd	2:11.5	0.0	Yutaka Take	Lovely Day
Apr 5	Hanshin	Sankei Osaka Hai	2	2,000 m (Heavy)	14	7	1.4 (1)	2nd	2:03.2	0.3	Yutaka Take	Lachesis
May 3	Kyoto	Tenno Sho (Spring)	1	3,200 m (Firm)	17	13	3.3 (1)	7th	3:15.2	0.5	Yutaka Take	Gold Ship

Legend:
Turf

== Stud career ==
Kizuna was retired to the Shadai Stallion Station and has a current stud fee of ¥20,000,000. He ranked first on the Japanese Leading Sire list in 2024 and 2025.

=== Notable progeny ===
Below data is based on JBIS Stallion Reports.

c = colt, f = filly, g = gelding
bold = G1/Jpn1 stakes

Grade One winners
Foaled	Name	Sex	Major Wins
2017	Akai Ito	f	**Queen Elizabeth II Cup**
2018	Songline	f	Fuji Stakes, 1351 Turf Sprint, **Yasuda Kinen** (twice), **Victoria Mile**
2021	Justin Milano	c	Kyodo Tsushin Hai, **Satsuki Shō**
2021	Kazeno Runner	c	Saga Kinen, **Kawasaki Kinen**
2021	Sixpence	c	Spring Stakes, Mainichi Ōkan, Nakayama Kinen, **Yasuda Kinen**
2021	W Heart Bond	f	Miyako Stakes, **Champions Cup**
2022	Natural Rise	c	Keihin Hai, **Haneda Hai**, **Tokyo Derby**
2023	Monroe Walk	f	Rose Stakes, **Shuka Sho**

Other winners
Foaled	Name	Sex	Major Wins
2017	Ablaze	f	Flower Cup
2017	Bien Fait	g	Hakodate Sprint Stakes, Aoi Stakes, Hakodate Nisai Stakes
2017	Chimera Verite	c	Hokkaido Nisai Yushun
2017	Crystal Black	c	Keisei Hai
2017	Deep Bond	c	Kyoto Shimbun Hai, Hanshin Daishoten (twice), Prix Foy
2017	Hagino Alegrias	c	Sirius Stakes (twice), Nagoya Daishoten
2017	Maltese Diosa	f	Tulip Sho, Shion Stakes
2017	Shamrock Hill	f	Mermaid Stakes
2017	Teleos Bell	f	Queen Sho, Breeders' Gold Cup
2018	Bathrat Leon	c	New Zealand Trophy, Godolphin Mile, 1351 Turf Sprint
2018	Fine Rouge	f	Fairy Stakes, Shion Stakes
2018	Neviim	c	Hanshin Jump Stakes
2018	Stellaria	f	Fukushima Himba Stakes
2019	Ask Wild More	c	Kyoto Shimbun Hai
2019	Impress	c	Niigata Jump Stakes
2019	Meisho Gekirin	c	All Comers
2019	Parallel Vision	c	Lord Derby Challenge Trophy
2020	Alice Verite	f	Mermaid Stakes
2020	Conch Shell	f	Nakayama Himba Stakes
2021	June Take	c	Kyoto Shimbun Hai, Kyōto Kinen
2021	Queen's Walk	f	Queen Cup, Rose Stakes, Kinko Sho
2021	Stinger Glass	c	Diamond Stakes
2021	Sunrise Zipangu	c	Kozukata Sho, Miyako Stakes, Nagoya Grand Prix
2022	Ai Sansan	f	Aichi Hai
2022	Brown Ratchet	f	Artemis Stakes
2022	Eri King	c	Kyoto Nisai Stakes, Kobe Shimbun Hai
2022	Lesedrama	f	Flower Cup
2022	Lila Emblem	c	Shinzan Kinen
2022	Magic Sands	c	Sapporo Nisai Stakes
2022	Satono Shining	c	Kisaragi Sho
2022	Shonan Xanadu	f	Fillies' Revue
2023	Audacia	c	Spring Stakes
2023	Dream Core	f	Queen Cup
2023	Peintre Naif	c	Tokyo Sports Hai Nisai Stakes

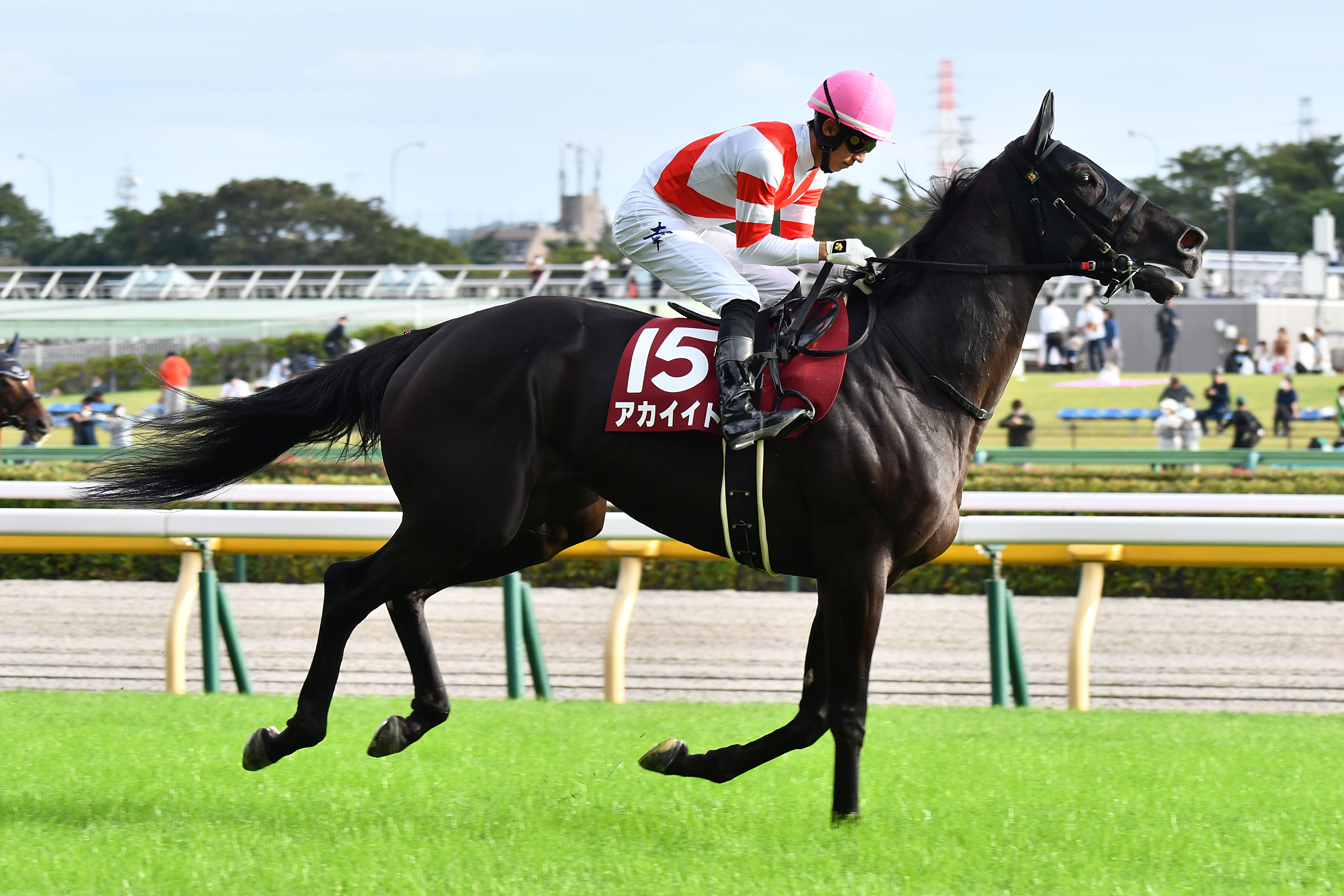
Akai Ito

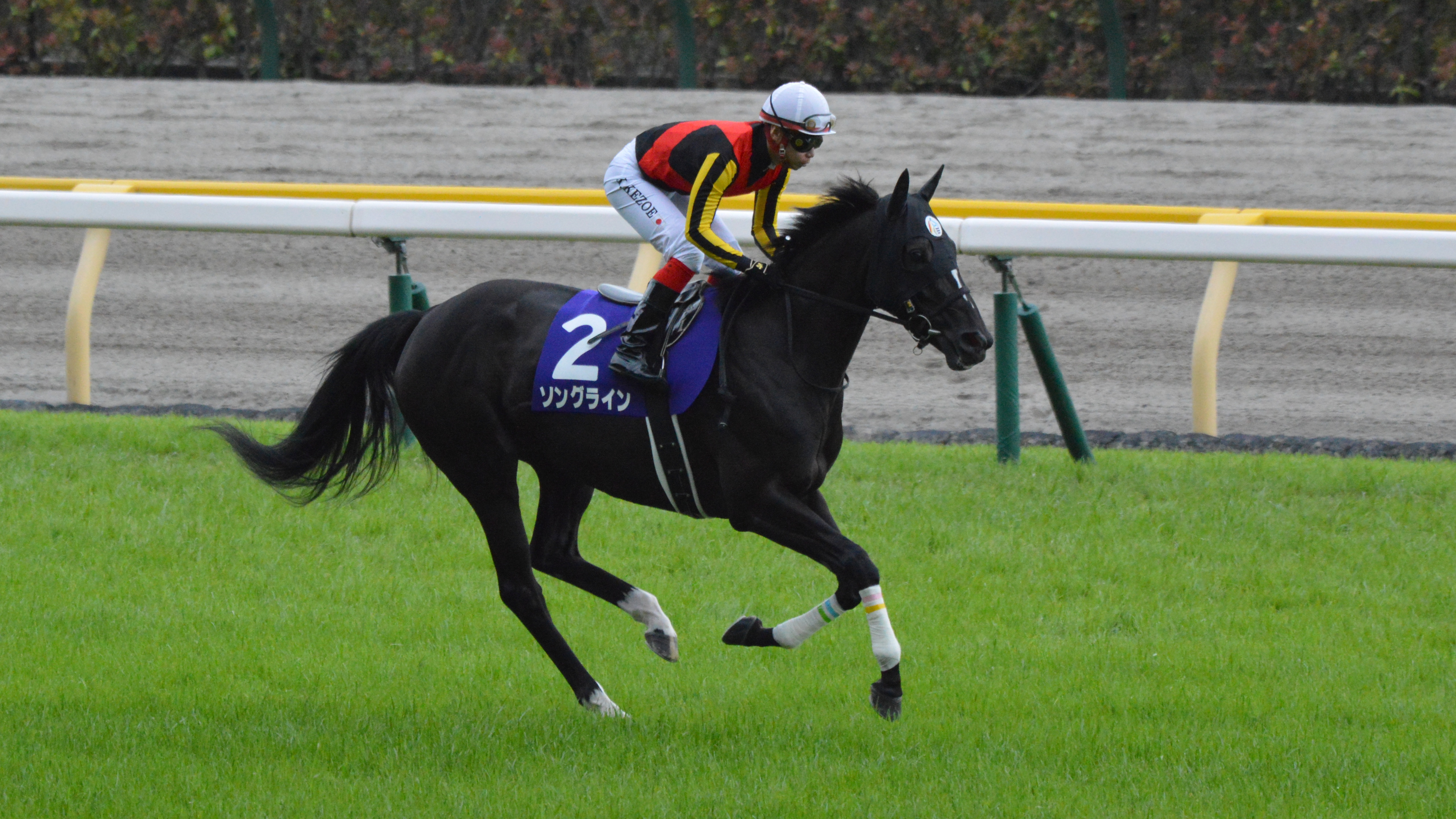
Songline

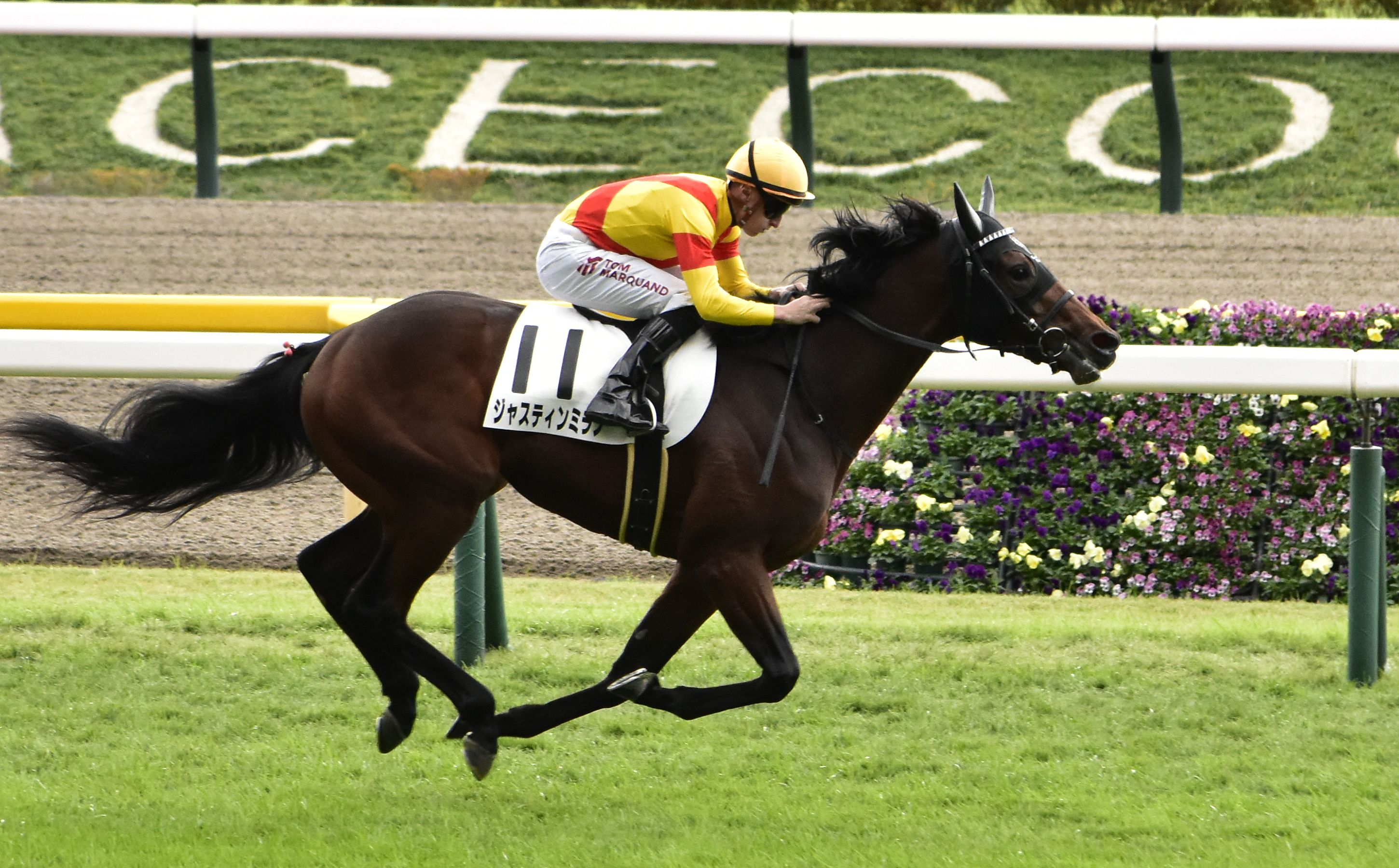
Justin Milano

Kazeno Runner

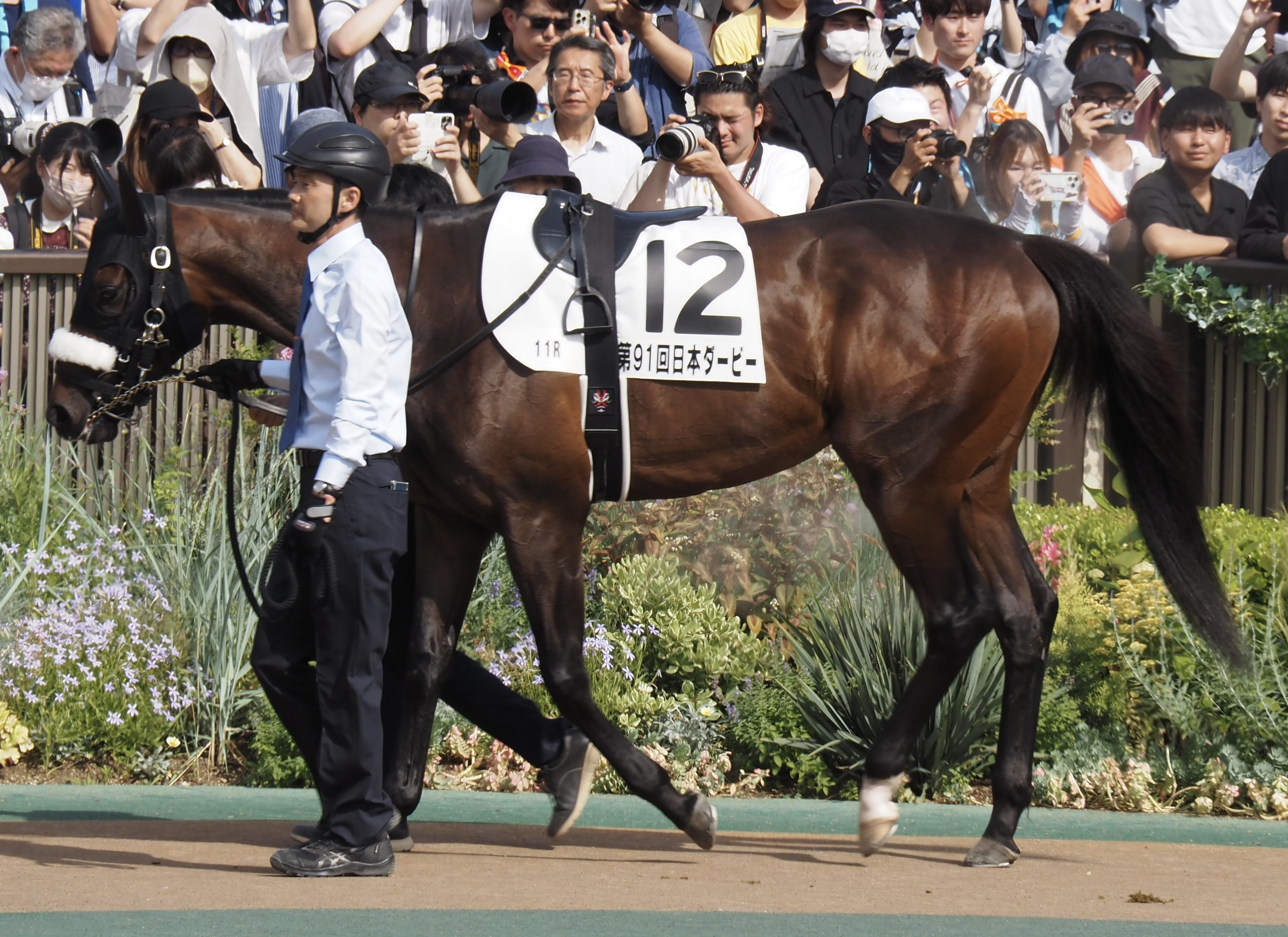
Sixpence

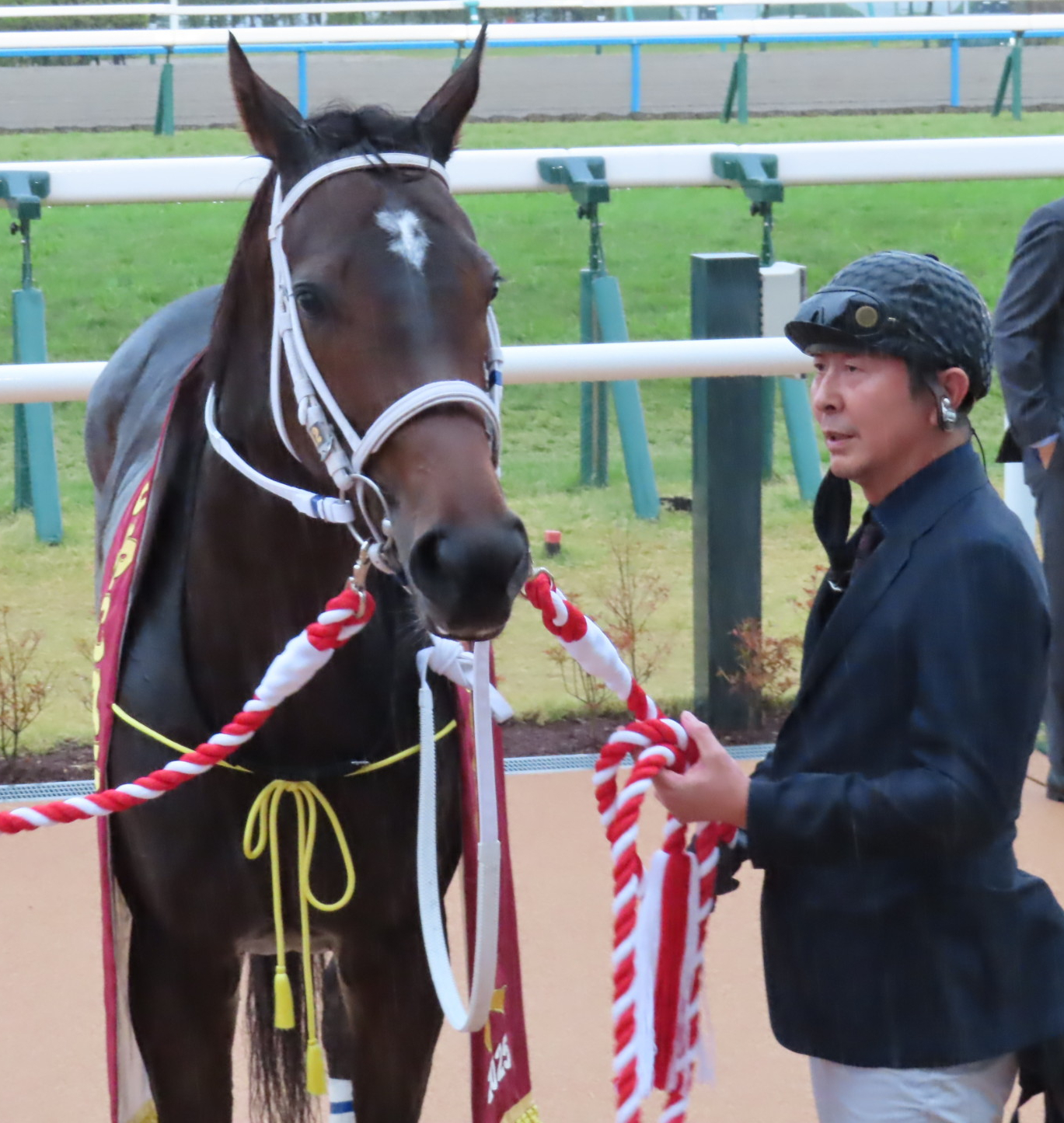
W Heart Bond

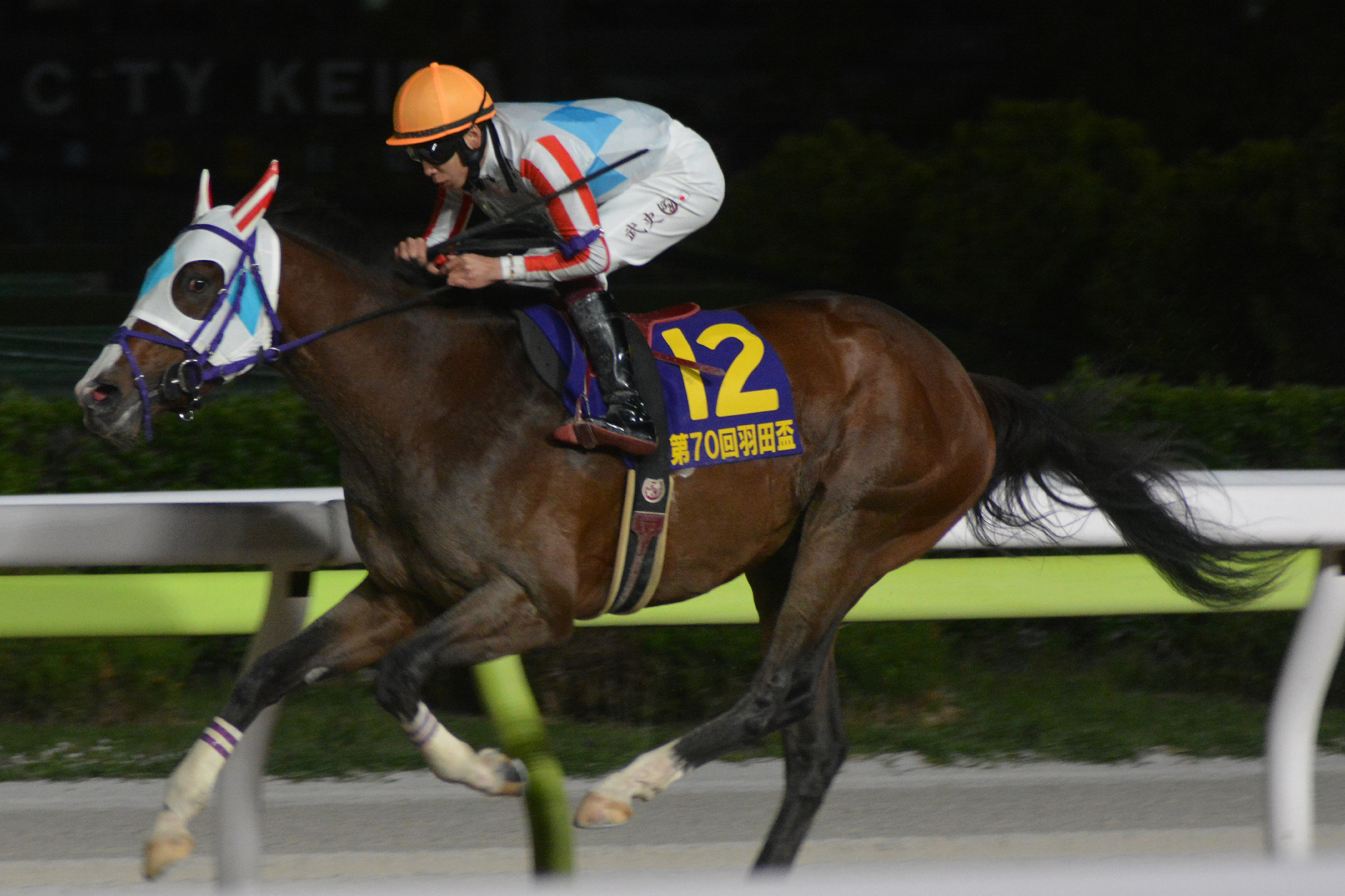
Natural Rise

Monroe Walk

== Pedigree ==
Pedigree of Kizuna (JPN), brown horse, 2010
Sire Deep Impact (JPN) 2002	Sunday Silence (USA); 1986	Halo	Hail to Reason
Sire Deep Impact (JPN) 2002	Sunday Silence (USA); 1986	Halo	Cosmah
Sire Deep Impact (JPN) 2002	Sunday Silence (USA); 1986	Wishing Well	Understanding
Sire Deep Impact (JPN) 2002	Sunday Silence (USA); 1986	Wishing Well	Mountain Flower
Sire Deep Impact (JPN) 2002	Wind in Her Hair (IRE); 1991	Alzao	Lyphard
Sire Deep Impact (JPN) 2002	Wind in Her Hair (IRE); 1991	Alzao	Lady Rebecca
Sire Deep Impact (JPN) 2002	Wind in Her Hair (IRE); 1991	Burghclere	Busted
Sire Deep Impact (JPN) 2002	Wind in Her Hair (IRE); 1991	Burghclere	Highclere
Dam Catequil (CAN) 1990	Storm Cat (USA); 1983	Storm Bird	Northern Dancer
Dam Catequil (CAN) 1990	Storm Cat (USA); 1983	Storm Bird	South Ocean
Dam Catequil (CAN) 1990	Storm Cat (USA); 1983	Terlingua	Secretariat
Dam Catequil (CAN) 1990	Storm Cat (USA); 1983	Terlingua	Crimson Saint
Dam Catequil (CAN) 1990	Pacific Princess (USA); 1973	Damascus	Sword Dancer
Dam Catequil (CAN) 1990	Pacific Princess (USA); 1973	Damascus	Kerala
Dam Catequil (CAN) 1990	Pacific Princess (USA); 1973	Fiji	Acropolis
Dam Catequil (CAN) 1990	Pacific Princess (USA); 1973	Fiji	Rififi (Family: 13-a)
