= Bluebird Cup =

Bluebird Cup ブルーバードカップ
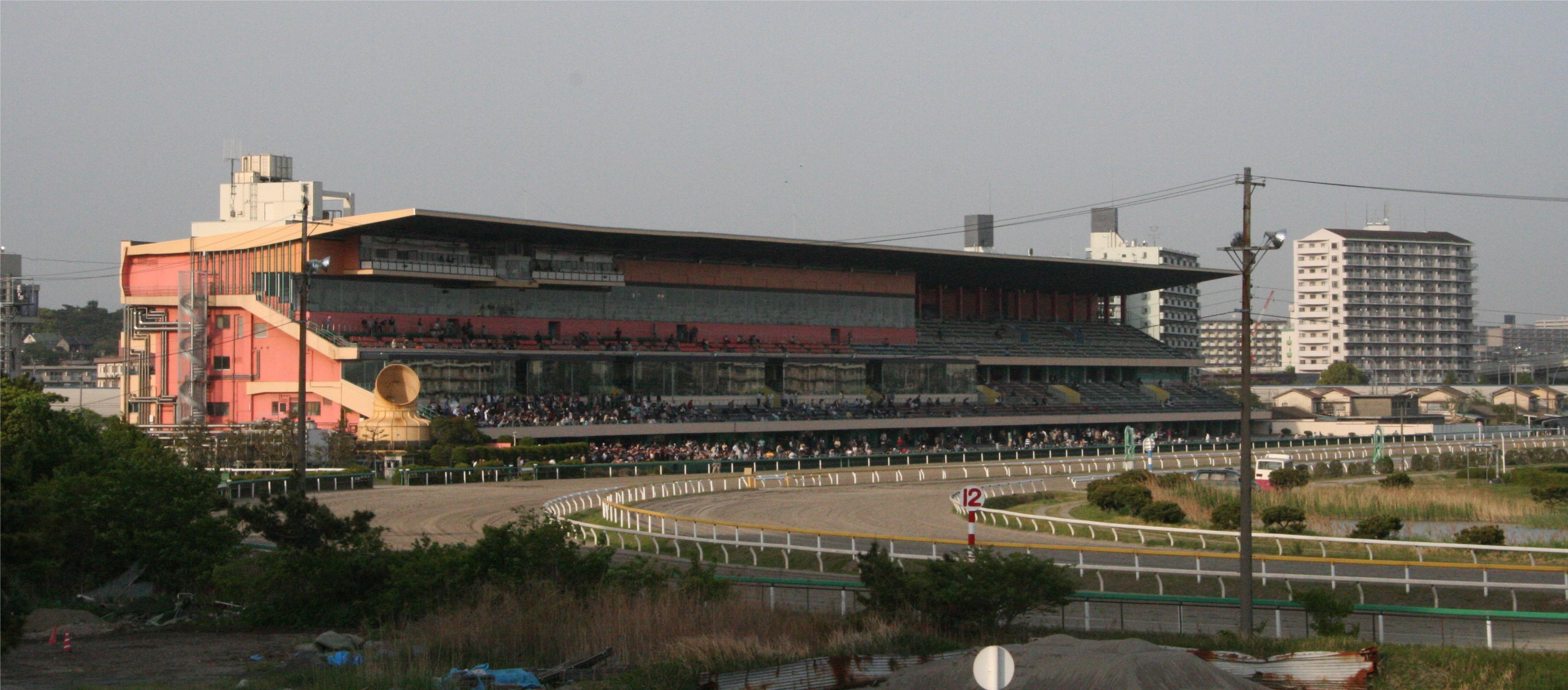
- Funabashi Racecourse Grandstand
- Class: Domestic Grade III (Jpn III)
- Location: Funabashi Racecourse
- Inaugurated: February 15, 1956
- Race type: Thoroughbred Flat racing

Race information
- Distance: 1800 metres
- Surface: Dirt
- Track: Left-handed
- Qualification: 3-y-o
- Weight: 56 kg (54 kg for fillies)
- Purse: ¥ 40,800,000 (as of 2026); 1st: ¥ 24,000,000; 2nd: ¥ 8,400,000; 3rd: ¥ 4,800,000

The Bluebird Cup (ブルーバードカップ) is a domestic grade III (JpnIII) flat horse race in Japan.

== Background ==
The Bluebird Cup is a JpnIII (Dirt Grade) stakes race in Japan’s NAR (National Association of Racing) system, organized by the Chiba Prefecture Racing Association and held at Funabashi Racecourse. Since 2024, it is run annually in mid-January over 1,800 meters on dirt, exclusively for 3-year-old Thoroughbreds. The race serves as an official trial for the Haneda Hai, with the winning locally trained horse earning priority entry into the race.

Eligibility includes both NAR-selected and JRA-selected horses, with up to four JRA-trained runners permitted. Weight is set at 56 kg (54 kg for fillies). Additional weight penalties apply based on prior earnings: JRA horses with over ¥5 million in prize money, or NAR horses with over ¥12 million, carry an extra 1 kg. The first-place prize in 2026 is ¥24 million. The race’s official title is the “Nikkan Gendai Sho Bluebird Cup”, named after the newspaper Nikkan Gendai, which provides the winner’s trophy. Multiple subsidiary prizes are awarded, including honors from the JRA Chairman, the National Association of Racing, and regional breeding associations.

== History ==
The Bluebird Cup was first run on February 15, 1956, as a restricted race for 4-year-old (by East Asian age reckoning) Arabian-bred horses, a common format in early Japanese racing. It remained an Arabian-only event in 1997. A change occurred in 1998, when the race was opened to Thoroughbreds under an “All-Comer” format. From 1999 onward, it became Thoroughbred-exclusive. The race maintained graded status until 2005, after which it was downgraded to a non-graded special race from 2006 to 2016. In 2017, it was elevated to quasi-graded (jun-jusho) status. During this period (2006–2022), it also served as a trial for the Tokyo Bay Cup, granting top finishers priority entry.

A major restructuring came in 2024, as part of Japan’s nationwide dirt racing system reform. The Bluebird Cup was reinstated as a formal Dirt Grade race, designated JpnIII, and repositioned as a key prep for the Haneda Hai. The distance was extended from 1,600m to 1,800m, aligning it with modern dirt classic standards. Despite the long hiatus from graded status, the race retained its original numbering, thus the 2024 edition was officially the 50th Bluebird Cup.

== Past winners ==
Year	Winner	Age	Length (in m)	Jockey	Trainer	Owner	Organization	Time
1956	Fureccha	3	D1600	Motonobu Torikai	Motonobu Torikai	Matsuo Hata	Kawasaki	1:47.4
1957	Ichikiyo Takara	3	D1600	Akira Taniguchi	Genso Taniguchi	Kinya Kawamata	Funabashi	1:45.2
1958	Moaner	3	D1600	Shigeru Suda	Manji Kimura	Tsune Oshita	Funabashi	1:43.4
1959	Asiantha	3	D1600	Tokichi Arayama	Kaiji Satake	Shinpei Shirai	Funabashi	1:46.3
1960	Shimauta	3	D1600	Mamoru Katsumata	Kinshu Sato	Takako Ueda	Kawasaki	1:49.4
1961	Daigo Wilson	3	D1600	Takehisa Sasaki	Shunkichi Suzuki	Shuichi Sato	Kawasaki	1:45.3
1962	Dai Ryu	3	D1600	Yasuhiro Fujita	Sanji Sekiguchi	Fusae Anzai	Funabashi	1:44.1
1963	Fukutomi Homare	3	D1600	Masaru Kobude	Shoichi Morita	Tadashi Kobayashi	Ohi	1:45.5
1964	Adel Bauer	3	D1600	Shigeru Suda	Shota Yamamoto	Shuji Mogi	Ohi	1:43.5
1965	Bingo	3	D1600	Shigeru Suda	Toshie Tanaka	Shigeru Tokutake	Ohi	1:44.4
1966	Hanano Kinen	3	D1600	Tadao Atsumi	Mitsuo Moriya	Toshie Moritani	Ohi	1:42.8
1967	Hojitsu	3	D1600	Tsuneo Takayanagi	Tatsuki Musashi	Yuzo Kato	Ohi	1:43.5
1968	Bio	3	D1600	Norihiko Miyashita	Hitoshi Miyashita	Chube Suwa	Funabashi	1:42.7
1969	Morisei Yuu	3	D1600	Sakae Monoi	Harumatsu Yamashita	Seiichiro Moriya	Ohi	1:42.8
1970	Speed Matsuku	3	D1600	Norihiko Miyashita	Mutsuo Hamizuki	Kiichi Yamamoto	Funabashi	1:42.9
1971	Bourgeon	3	D1600	Kenji Uchiyama	Mankichi Kimura	Teru Kimura	Funabashi	1:43.3
(No race in 1972 due to an outbreak of Equine influenza)
1973	Dalai Lama	3	D1600	Kazuhiro Tabeta	Kazuo Kimura	Kimura Farm Co. Ltd.	Funabashi	1:41.3
1974	Miss Dairin	3	D1600	Tsugio Kakimoto	Isamu Sato	Yoshikatsu Yamagiwa	Funabashi	1:39.8
1975	Hokuto Raiden	3	D1600	Fujiro Kogo	Kosuke Hirashima	Chube Suzuki	Funabashi	1:41.8
1976	Marutoku Chidori	3	D1600	Saburo Takahashi	Akira Kumazawa	Tokuharu Yoshino	Funabashi	1:40.5
1977	Sodeno Boy	3	D1600	Kazuya Ushijima	Tadashi Ito	Rii Fukushi	Funabashi	1:42.6
1978	Hachino Win	3	D1600	Makoto Matsushiro	Shunosuke Senkiri	Nobuyasu Kawada	Funabashi	1:43.6
1979	Saryu Musashi	3	D1600	Takaharu Kuwajima	Hiroyuki Takamatsu	Kyuzo Ushimaru	Funabashi	1:41.7
1980	Ike Aretsu Po	3	D1600	Ichiro Watanabe	Tetsuro Miyashita	Toyoharu Ikeda	Funabashi	1:41.7
1981	Sanriki Yuu	3	D1600	Shigeru Honma	Katsuhisa Adachi	Taneaki Takahashi	Kawasaki	1:42.5
1982	Keiwei Homare	3	D1600	Saburo Takahashi	Masaru Kobude	Keiji Kameda	Ohi	1:41.5
1983	Hayano Lancer	3	D1600	Saburo Takahashi	Sanchiro Fukushima	Suminori Yoshinaga	Kawasaki	1:42.6
1984	Kaneyama Kazan	3	D1600	Chiaki Hori	Mitsuyuki Tomiwaki	Yoshikatsu Yamagiwa	Ohi	1:42.7
1985 (dh)	Nomura Daio	3	D1600	Saburo Takahashi	Harumatsu Yamashita	Akio Nomura	Ohi	1:42.2
1985 (dh)	Dark Lua	3	D1600	Masami Yoshida	Nobuo Mukai	Sumiko Mogushi	Urawa	1:42.2
1986	Toyokura Teio	3	D1600	Takashi Ishizaki	Yozosuke Idezukuri	Toyokura Shoji Co. Ltd.	Funabashi	1:43.8
1987	Hokuto Light O	3	D1600	Shigeru Honda	Hisashi Matsuda	Hokuto Farm Co. Ltd.	Kawasaki	1:43.6
1988	Otaru Homer	3	D1600	Saburo Takahashi	Sakae Monoi	Ritsuko Yoneda	Ohi	1:42.9
1989	Hokuto Emperor	3	D1600	Takaharu Kuwajima	Minoru Goto	Hokuto Farm Co. Ltd.	Funabashi	1:42.2
1990	Mister Tomikawa	3	D1600	Junichi Yuasa	Toshikazu Nakai	Eiji Fujimoto	Funabashi	1:44.3
1991	Nyuto Mos	3	D1600	Takashi Sato	Tatsuo Hirose	Shigemi Kawasaki	Urawa	1:45.5
1992	Hitachi Tozai	3	D1600	Takehisa Sasaki	Katsuhisa Adachi	Masatoshi Kanda	Kawasaki	1:44.9
1993	Gate Walking	3	D1600	Satoshi Saito	Hayato Saito	Kokichi Kidoguchi	Funabashi	1:44.8
1994	Grand Site	3	D1600	Takaharu Kuwajima	Yasuo Niwa	Eiko Umezaki	Funabashi	1:43.5
1995	Homare Shouhai	3	D1600	Takashi Ishizaki	Hiroshi Degawa	Akitsugu Ito	Funabashi	1:44.1
1996	Maruzen Mao	3	D1600	Takeshi Nozaki	Goro Ota	Kiyomi Tanaka	Kawasaki	1:43.7
1997	Maruzen Ichiban	3	D1600	Takashi Ishizaki	Shozo Ebara	Akitsugu Ito	Funabashi	1:46.8
1998	S.K. Tiger	3	D1600	Yuki Sato	Takatsugu Hatano	Sukenori Ito	Funabashi	1:42.3
1999	Shinsei Raiden	3	D1600	Takashi Ishizaki	Masayuki Kawashima	Tatsuhiko Kimura	Funabashi	1:42.7
2000	Hinode Coating	3	D1600	Takashi Sato	Masayuki Kawashima	Asabiru Real Estate Co. Ltd.	Funabashi	1:40.3
2001	Tomiken Phantom	3	D1600	Takashi Ishizaki	Katsushi Degawa	Tomiken Co. Ltd.	Funabashi	1:43.0
2002	Back Gear	3	D1600	Takashi Ishizaki	Masayuki Kawashima	Tatsuhiko Kimura	Funabashi	1:42.6
2003	Nike a Delight	3	D1600	Takashi Ishizaki	Ryuichi Degawa	Sumi Ono	Funabashi	1:42.1
2004	Tomiken Winner	3	D1600	Seiji Sago	Michihiko Okahara	Tomiken Co. Ltd.	Funabashi	1:42.6
2005	Time Ryan	3	D1600	Takashi Ishizaki	Masatoshi Kawashima	Tatsuhiko Kimura	Funabashi	1:39.9
(Special and quasi-graded race from 2006 to 2022)
(No race in 2023)
2024	Ammothyella	3	D1800	Ryusei Sakai	Mikio Matsunaga	Hiroo Race Co. Ltd.	JRA	1:55.9
2025	Melchior	3	D1800	Yuga Kawada	Mikio Matsunaga	Katsumi Yoshida	JRA	1:53.3
2026	Finger	3	D1800	Keita Tosaki	Hiroyasu Tanaka	M's Racing	JRA	1:55:4

== See also ==
- Horse racing in Japan
- List of Japanese flat horse races

=== Netkeiba ===
- 2024 en, 2025 en, 2026 en
