= Haneda Hai =

Japanese thoroughbred horse race

Haneda Hai 羽田盃
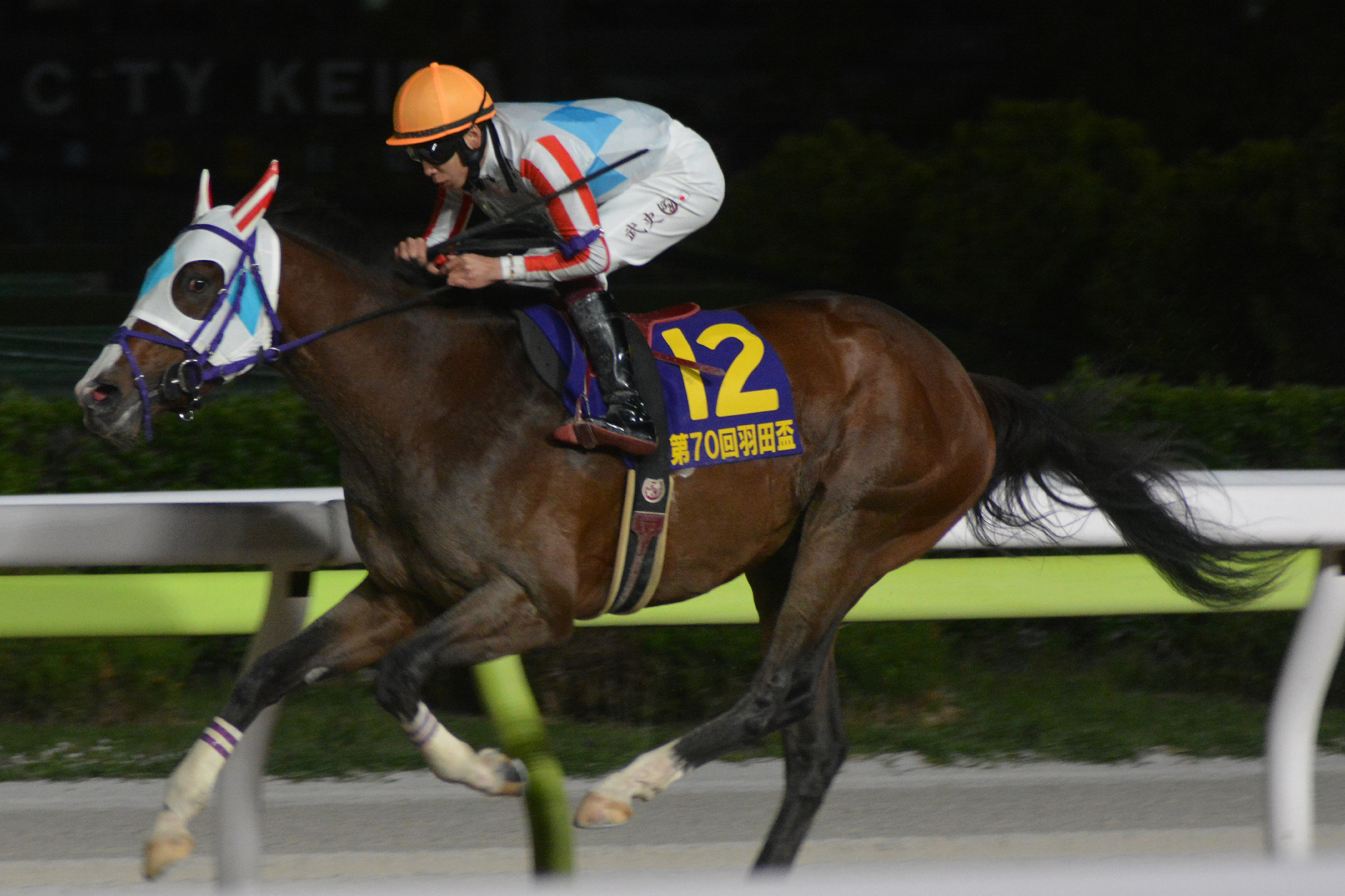
- 2025 Haneda Hai winner, Natural Rise
- Class: Domestic Grade 1 (JpnI); International Listed
- Location: Ohi Racecourse; Shinagawa, Tokyo
- Inaugurated: 18 April 1956 (70 years ago)
- Race type: Thoroughbred

Race information
- Distance: 1,800 meters (about 9 furlongs or 1 1/8 miles)
- Surface: Dirt
- Track: Right-handed
- Qualification: Three-years-old no geldings
- Weight: 57 kg Allowances; 2 kg for fillies 2 kg for S. Hemisphere
- Purse: ¥ 102,000,000 (as of 2026); 1st: ¥ 60,000,000; 2nd: ¥ 21,000,000; 3rd: ¥ 12,000,000
- Bonuses: Triple Crown of Dirt Series; Winner of Haneda Hai, Tokyo Derby and Japan Dirt Classic ¥ 80,000,000

The Haneda Hai (羽田盃; "Haneda Cup") is a Japanese Domestic Grade 1 flat race for three year old thoroughbred colts and fillies run over a distance of 1,800 meters (about 9 furlongs) on dirt at Ohi Racecourse in Shinagawa, Tokyo in late April to early May.

== History ==
It began in 1956 as the Ohi Hai. Its name was changed to Haneda Hai in commemoration of Haneda Racecourse which used to be situated next to Shinagawa.

The distance has been changed several times. It has been run as follows:

- from its inception until 1966 at 1,800 meters
- from 1967 to 1995 at 2,000 meters
- from 1996 to 1998 at 1,800 meters
- from 1999 to 2001 at 1,600 meters
- from 2002 to 2003 at 1,790 meters
- from 2004 onwards at 1,800 meters

Until 2023, this race was the first leg of the South Kanto (南関東; Minami-Kantō) Triple Crown along with Tokyo Derby and Japan Dirt Derby and only horses belonging to South Kanto Horseracing could run.

=== Dirt Grade Promotion ===
The race was promoted to Domestic Grade 1 along with Tokyo Derby in 2024. Formerly the first leg of the South Kanto Triple Crown, it became the first leg of new Japanese Triple Crown of Dirt. Entries were expanded to 16 horses with 4 horses belonging to Japan Racing Association.

== Trial races ==
Trial races provide automatic berths to the winning horses or placed horses as specified.

Race Name	Class	Racecourse	Distance	Condition
Bluebird Cup	JpnIII	Funabashi	1,800 meters	Winner that belongs to NAR.
Kumotori Sho	JpnIII	Ohi	1,800 meters	Two horses that belong to JRA who placed 3rd or better.
Kumotori Sho	JpnIII	Ohi	1,800 meters	Top 2 horses that belong to NAR regardless of placing.
Starburst Cup	OP	Ohi	2,000 meters	Winner
Keihin Hai	JpnII	Ohi	1,700 meters	Two horses that belong to JRA who placed 3rd or better.
Keihin Hai	JpnII	Ohi	1,700 meters	Top 2 horses that belong to NAR regardless of placing.

Races listed below does not provide automatic berths, but still important steps for this race.

Race Name	Class	Racecourse	Distance	Condition
Classic Challenge	OP	Ohi	1,800 meters	Winner
Spring Cup	SPI	Nagoya	1,700 meters	Winner

== Winners since 2004 ==
Year	Winner	Jockey	Trainer	Owner	Time
2004	Tokino Kojiro (JPN)	Nobuhiro Yamada (JPN)	(Japan) Rentaro Hasegawa (KAW)	Hisatsugu Tanaka (JPN)	1:53.5
2005	Sea Chariot (USA)	Hiroyuki Uchida (JPN)	(Japan) Masayuki Kawashima (FUN)	Darley Japan Racing (JPN)	1:53.5
2006	Thank You Win (JPN)	Seiji Sakai (JPN)	(Japan) Mitsuhiro Okabayashi (FUN)	Yoshimitsu Itaka (JPN)	1:53.1
2007	Top Sabaton (JPN)	Shun Ishizaki (JPN)	(Japan) Masao Kakimoto (FUN)	Tsuya Kiya (JPN)	1:51.1
2008	Nick Banyan (JPN)	Fumio Matoba (JPN)	(Japan) Yoichi Sasaki (OHI)	Yasushi Tsumura (JPN)	1:52.8
2009	Nike High Grade (JPN)	Keita Tosaki (JPN)	(Japan) Masayuki Kawashima (FUN)	Seiji Ono (JPN)	1:54.9
2010	Seize the Gold (JPN)	Hiroyuki Uchida (JPN)	(Japan) Katsunori Arayama (OHI)	Daiten Farm Co., Ltd. (JPN)	1:53.7
2011	Clave Secreta (JPN)	Keita Tosaki (JPN)	(Japan) Masayuki Kawashima (FUN)	Sunday Racing (JPN)	1:52.1
2012	Art Sahara (JPN)	Tadanari Konno (JPN)	(Japan) Katsunori Arayama (OHI)	Daiten Farm Co., Ltd. (JPN)	1:52.9
2013	Outgeneral (JPN)	Norifumi Mikamoto (JPN)	(Japan) Masayuki Kawashima (FUN)	Sunday Racing (JPN)	1:52.8
2014	Happy Sprint (JPN)	Hiroto Yoshihara (JPN)	(Japan) Junpei Morishita (OHI)	Tsuji Bokujo (JPN)	1:52.6
2015	Studium (JPN)	Shun Ishizaki (JPN)	(Japan) Yoshiyuki Yano (FUN)	Nicks Co., Ltd. (JPN)	1:54.6
2016	Turbulence (JPN)	Taito Mori (JPN)	(Japan) Takashi Mizuno (URA)	Shunji Izumi (JPN)	1:55.5
2017	Captain King (JPN)	Takayuki Yano (JPN)	(Japan) Naoyuki Matoba (OHI)	Toshio Hiramoto (JPN)	1:54.4
2018	Yamano Fight (JPN)	Kota Motohashi (JPN)	(Japan) Yoshiyuki Yano (FUN)	Akihiko Yamaguchi (JPN)	1:53.7
2019	Mutually (JPN)	Norifumi Mikamoto (JPN)	(Japan) Yoshiyuki Yano (FUN)	Jotaro Ishise (JPN)	1:53.5
2020	Gold Heuer (JPN)	Seiji Yamazaki (JPN)	(Japan) Hiroshi Iwamoto (KAW)	Hatsue Okada (JPN)	1:53.3
2021	Transcendence (JPN)	Taito Mori (JPN)	(Japan) Satoshi Kokubo (URA)	Eishu Tokuhara (JPN)	1:51.5
2022	Miyagi Zao (JPN)	Daisuke Mashima (JPN)	(Japan) Junpei Morishita (OHI)	Masatoshi Suzuki (JPN)	1:52.4
2023	Mick Fire (JPN)	Norifumi Mikamoto (JPN)	(Japan) Kazuo Watanabe (OHI)	Koichi Hoshika (JPN)	1:50.9
Triple Crown of Dirt Series
2024	Amante Bianco (JPN)	Yuga Kawada (JPN)	(Japan) Keisuke Miyata (JRA)	Silk Racing (JPN)	1:53.9
2025	Natural Rise (JPN)	Takeshi Yokoyama (JPN)	(Japan) Keizo Ito (JRA)	Hiroyuki Yoshioka (JPN)	1:52.1
2026	Finger (JPN)	Keita Tosaki (JPN)	(Japan) Hiroyasu Tanaka (JRA)	M's Racing (JPN)	1:52.7

== Earlier winners ==
- 1956 – Otone
- 1957 – Hatsuyuki
- 1958 – Daini Kotobuki
- 1959 – Harusekito
- 1960 – Daisan Kotobuki
- 1961 – Yaguchi Hope
- 1962 – Bold Pride
- 1963 – Kokuyu
- 1964 – Kotobukino Ni
- 1965 – Masa Ho
- 1966 – Ichi Shiden
- 1967 – Hikaru Takai
- 1968 – China Cap
- 1969 – Yamano Taiyo
- 1970 – Daini Herusu O
- 1971 – Fuji Prince
- 1972 – Tokiwa Taiyo
- 1973 – Yokozan
- 1974 – Mitsuru Kotobuki
- 1975 – Golden Ribot
- 1976 – Die Hard Kotobuki
- 1977 – Takeno Okan
- 1978 – Hatsushiba O
- 1979 – Soul Chateau
- 1980 – Takafuji Minoru
- 1981 – Konan Ruby
- 1982 – Hospitality
- 1983 – San Oi
- 1984 – King Haiseiko
- 1985 – Maruzen Adiaru
- 1986 – Hanaki O
- 1987 – Shinano Davis
- 1988 – Ryuko King
- 1989 – Rosita
- 1990 – Outrun Seiko
- 1991 – Urban Top
- 1992 – Kashiwa's Princess
- 1993 – Blue Family
- 1994 – Spectacle
- 1995 – Hikari Rufas
- 1996 – Nike Jaguar
- 1997 – Canyon Roman
- 1998 – Gold Head
- 1999 – Orion the Thanks
- 2000 – Yellow Power
- 2001 – Toshin Blizzard
- 2002 – Principal River
- 2003 – Nike a Delight

== See also ==
- Horse racing in Japan
- List of Japanese flat horse races
