= Natural Rise =

Japanese Thoroughbred racehorse (foaled 2022)

Natural Rise ナチュラルライズ
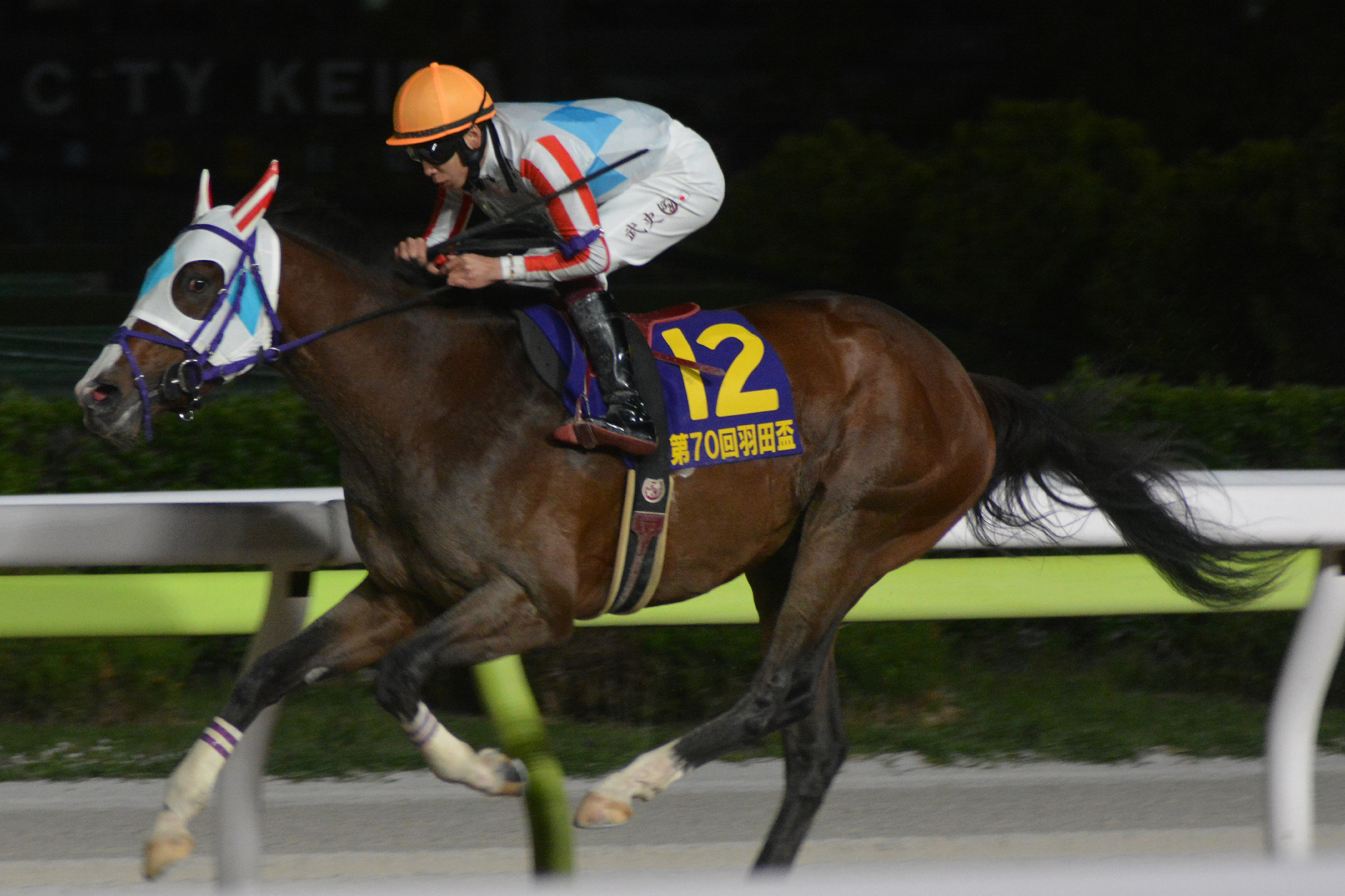
- Natural Rise winning the 2025 Haneda Hai
- Breed: Thoroughbred
- Sire: Kizuna
- Grandsire: Deep Impact
- Dam: Lady Madonna
- Damsire: Distorted Humor
- Sex: Colt
- Foaled: 2 February 2022
- Country: Japan
- Colour: Bay
- Breeder: Grand Bokujo
- Owner: Hiroyuki Yoshioka
- Racing colours
- Trainer: Keizo Ito
- Jockey: Takeshi Yokoyama
- Record: 12: 5-1-0 (4 JRA: 2-0-0; 8 NAR: 3-1-0)
- Earnings: ¥237,943,000

Major wins
- Haneda Hai (2025); Tokyo Derby (2025); Keihin Hai (2025)

Natural Rise (Japanese: ナチュラルライズ, Hepburn: Nachuraru Raizu; foaled 2 February 2022) is a Japanese Thoroughbred racehorse. He has competed since 2024, recording five wins in eleven starts, including the Haneda Hai (JpnI) and Tokyo Derby (JpnI) in 2025, and the Keihin Hai (JpnII) in 2025. He won the first two legs of the 3-Year-Old Dirt Triple Crown but finished second in the Japan Dirt Classic (JpnI), the third leg.

== Background ==
Natural Rise is a bay colt bred in Shinhidaka, Hokkaido, by Grand Bokujo. He was sired by Kizuna, a son of Deep Impact, and his dam was Lady Madonna, a daughter of the American-bred stallion Distorted Humor. His racing name combines "Natural" with "Rise." He was purchased for ¥33,000,000 by Hiroyuki Yoshioka at the 2022 Select Sale weanling session. He was sent into training with Keizo Ito at the JRA's Miho Training Center.

== Racing career ==
=== 2024: Two-year-old season ===
Natural Rise debuted on July 20, 2024, in a maiden race on the dirt at Sapporo Racecourse, ridden by Takeshi Yokoyama, winning by six lengths. He was scratched from the Platanus Sho (Allowance) at Tokyo in October due to right foreleg phlegmon. On November 23, he won the Cattleya Stakes (Open) at Tokyo Racecourse, defeating Cracking by 0.75 lengths. He finished fourth in the Zen-Nippon Nisai Yushun (JpnI) at Kawasaki Racecourse in December.

=== 2025: Three-year-old season ===
On March 26, Natural Rise won the Keihin Hai (JpnII) at Oi Racecourse by six lengths, recording his first graded stakes victory. On April 29, he won the Haneda Hai (JpnI) at Oi by five lengths, recording his first Grade 1-level victory. On June 11, he won the Tokyo Derby (JpnI) at Oi by 2.5 lengths in a race record time of 2:03.8, completing the first two legs of the 3-Year-Old Dirt Triple Crown.

On October 8, he finished second in the Japan Dirt Classic (JpnI) at Oi, beaten three lengths by Narukami, failing to complete the triple crown. He finished eleventh in the Tokyo Daishoten (GI) at Oi in December.

=== 2026: Four-year-old season ===
Natural Rise finished seventh in the February Stakes (GI) at Tokyo in February. He finished eighth in the Kashiwa Kinen (JpnI) at Funabashi Racecourse in May and eighth in the Teio Sho (JpnI) at Oi in July. One month later, he finished in fourth place in the Elm Stakes. Yokoyama stated that even though he carried a pretty heavy load at 59 kg, the horse ran well and he satisfied with the result. However, not long after the race, the horse was diagnosed with a bowed tendon on his right forearm, forcing him off the racetracks for at least 9 months.

== Statistics ==
The following table details all 12 starts of Natural Rise's racing career based on official netkeiba and JBIS records. Record current as of 8 August 2026.

Date	Distance (Condition)	Race	Class	Course	Odds (Favourite)	Field	Finish	Time	Jockey	Winning (Losing) Margin	Winner (2nd Place)	Ref
2024 – two-year-old season
Jul 20	Dirt 1700 m (Firm)	2-Y-O Newcomer	Maiden	Sapporo	3.0 (1st)	14	1st	1:45.7	Takeshi Yokoyama	–1.0	(Berber Compass)	
Nov 23	Dirt 1600 m (Good)	Cattleya Stakes	Open	Tokyo	3.6 (2nd)	16	1st	1:36.4	Takeshi Yokoyama	–0.1	(Clay King)	
Dec 11	Dirt 1600 m (Firm)	Zen-Nippon Nisai Yushun	JpnI	Kawasaki	1.4 (1st)	11	4th	1:42.9	Takeshi Yokoyama	0.5	Myriad Love	
2025 – three-year-old season
Mar 26	Dirt 1700 m (Firm)	Keihin Hai	JpnII	Oi	1.9 (1st)	14	1st	1:45.5	Takeshi Yokoyama	–1.2	(Riko Sparrow)	
Apr 29	Dirt 1800 m (Soft)	Haneda Hai	JpnI	Oi	1.3 (1st)	15	1st	1:52.1	Takeshi Yokoyama	–1.0	(Night of Fire)	
Jun 11	Dirt 2000 m (Heavy)	Tokyo Derby	JpnI	Oi	1.5 (1st)	16	1st	2:03.8	Takeshi Yokoyama	–0.5	(Clay King)	
Oct 8	Dirt 2000 m (Firm)	Japan Dirt Classic	JpnI	Oi	1.9 (1st)	16	2nd	2:04.3	Takeshi Yokoyama	0.6	Narukami	
Dec 29	Dirt 2000 m (Soft)	Tokyo Daishoten	GI	Oi	5.5 (3rd)	15	11th	2:07.2	Takeshi Yokoyama	2.9	Diktaean	
2026 – four-year-old season
Feb 22	Dirt 1600 m (Firm)	February Stakes	GI	Tokyo	21.4 (7th)	16	7th	1:36.2	Takeshi Yokoyama	0.8	Costa Nova	
May 5	Dirt 1600 m (Firm)	Kashiwa Kinen	JpnI	Funabashi	6.9 (4th)	13	8th	1:41.1	Takeshi Yokoyama	2.5	Wilson Tesoro	
Jul 1	Dirt 2000 m (Good)	Teio Sho	JpnI	Oi	24.2 (8th)	13	8th	2:04.5	Takeshi Yokoyama	1.7	Mikki Fight	
Aug 8	Dirt 1700 m (Good)	Elm Stakes	GIII	Sapporo	9.4 (5th)	11	4th	1:44.8	Takeshi Yokoyama	1.0	Luxor Cafe	

== Pedigree ==
Pedigree of Natural Rise (JPN)
Sire Kizuna (JPN) 2010	Deep Impact (JPN); 2002	Sunday Silence	Halo
Sire Kizuna (JPN) 2010	Deep Impact (JPN); 2002	Sunday Silence	Wishing Well
Sire Kizuna (JPN) 2010	Deep Impact (JPN); 2002	Wind in Her Hair	Alzao
Sire Kizuna (JPN) 2010	Deep Impact (JPN); 2002	Wind in Her Hair	Burghclere
Sire Kizuna (JPN) 2010	Cat Quill (USA); 1990	Storm Cat	Storm Bird
Sire Kizuna (JPN) 2010	Cat Quill (USA); 1990	Storm Cat	Terlingua
Sire Kizuna (JPN) 2010	Cat Quill (USA); 1990	Pacific Princess	Damascus
Sire Kizuna (JPN) 2010	Cat Quill (USA); 1990	Pacific Princess	Fiji
Dam Lady Madonna (JPN) 2016	Distorted Humor (USA); 1993	Forty Niner	Mr. Prospector
Dam Lady Madonna (JPN) 2016	Distorted Humor (USA); 1993	Forty Niner	File
Dam Lady Madonna (JPN) 2016	Distorted Humor (USA); 1993	Danzig's Beauty	Danzig
Dam Lady Madonna (JPN) 2016	Distorted Humor (USA); 1993	Danzig's Beauty	Sweetest Chant
Dam Lady Madonna (JPN) 2016	Dream Writer (USA); 2009	Tale of the Cat	Storm Cat
Dam Lady Madonna (JPN) 2016	Dream Writer (USA); 2009	Tale of the Cat	Yarn
Dam Lady Madonna (JPN) 2016	Dream Writer (USA); 2009	Rebridled Dreams	Unbridled's Song
Dam Lady Madonna (JPN) 2016	Dream Writer (USA); 2009	Rebridled Dreams	Key Cents

- Natural Rise is inbred 3 × 4 to Storm Cat, 5 × 5 to Northern Dancer, and 4 × 5 to Mr. Prospector (dam side).

== See also ==
- Thoroughbred racing in Japan
- Haneda Hai
- Tokyo Derby
