= Round One Corporation =

Japanese retail chain

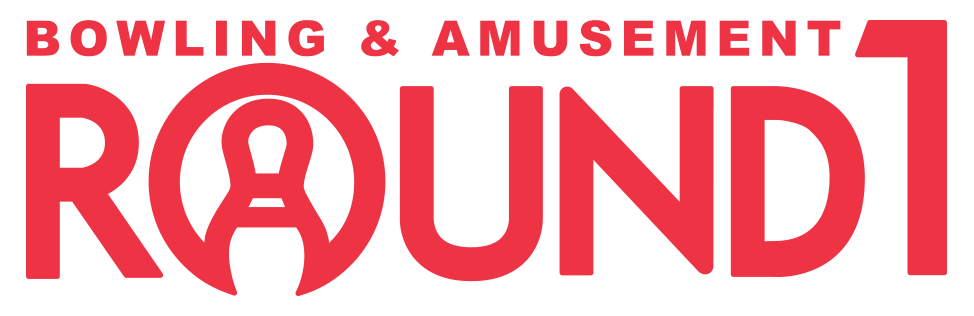

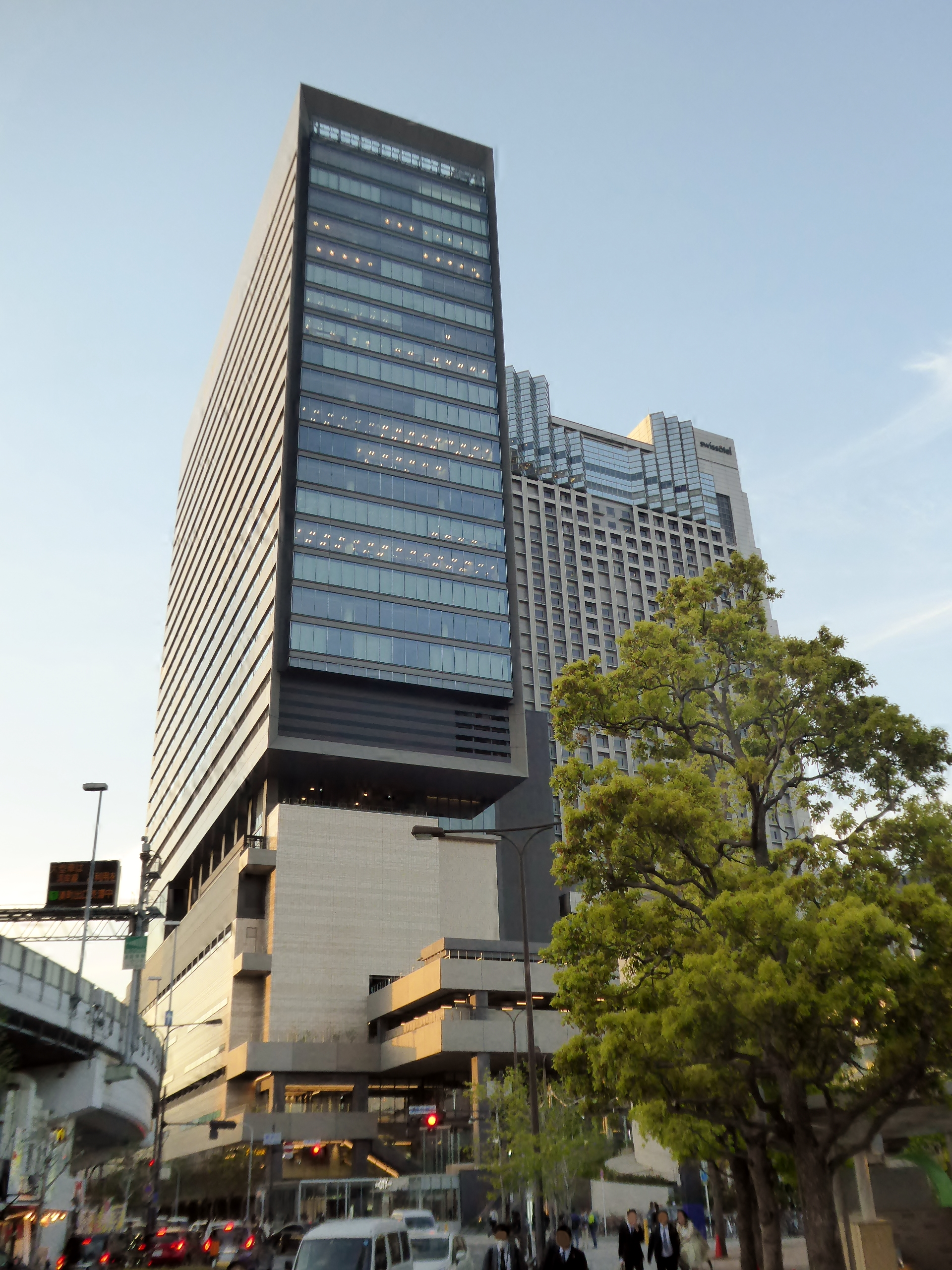
- Namba Skyo, where Round One Corporation's headquarters is located
- Native name: ラウンドワン
- Type: Public
- Traded as: TYO: 4680
- Founded: 1980; 46 years ago
- Founder: Masahiko Sugino
- Headquarters: Sakai-ku, Sakai City, Osaka, Japan
- Number of locations: 161 (2023)
- Area served: Japan; United States; China
- Subsidiaries: Round One Entertainment Inc.
- Website: round1.co.jp round1usa.com

Round One Corporation (Japanese: ラウンドワン, Hepburn: Raundo Wan), stylized as ROUND1, is a Japan-based amusement store chain. In Japan, the amusement centers offer bowling alleys, arcade games, karaoke, and billiards. Select larger locations also include SpoCha, which is an abbreviation for “Sports Challenge”, which offers a variety of items and indoor activities such as batting cages, basketball, volleyball, tennis, futsal, driving range, etc. Round One Entertainment Inc. is an American subsidiary of Round One Corporation. The amusement centers in the U.S. offer a variety of bowling, karaoke, video game arcade cabinets and redemption games, billiards, darts, and ping pong while serving a variety of food and beverages.

== History ==
=== 20th century ===
On December 25, 1980, the owner, Masahiko Sugino, founded a company called Sugino Kosan that featured a roller skate facility with arcade games. A few years later, the facility expanded to include a bowling alley which became very popular. This company later became the first Round One arcade in 1993. Since then, the company quickly expanded all across Japan.

=== 21st century ===
Before 2010, the company first attempted to expand to the United States, when the company established Round One U.S.A. Corp. But after not finding a good location for their first overseas location, this subsidiary closed down in July 2006. The subsidiary was relaunched in 2008 as Round One Entertainment Inc., and successfully opened up a Round One-branded location at Puente Hills Mall in City of Industry, California in 2010.

In Japan, there are currently 107 stores open.

In the U.S., there were stores open in 27 states as of 2016. More locations were planned to open in Indiana, and South Carolina. As of 2019, Round 1 plans to expand at a rate of 10 stores per year.

The brand also plans to open stores in the Asia-Pacific region. There is currently a location open in China, and a former location in Russia, which was divested in 2022.

== Arcade games ==
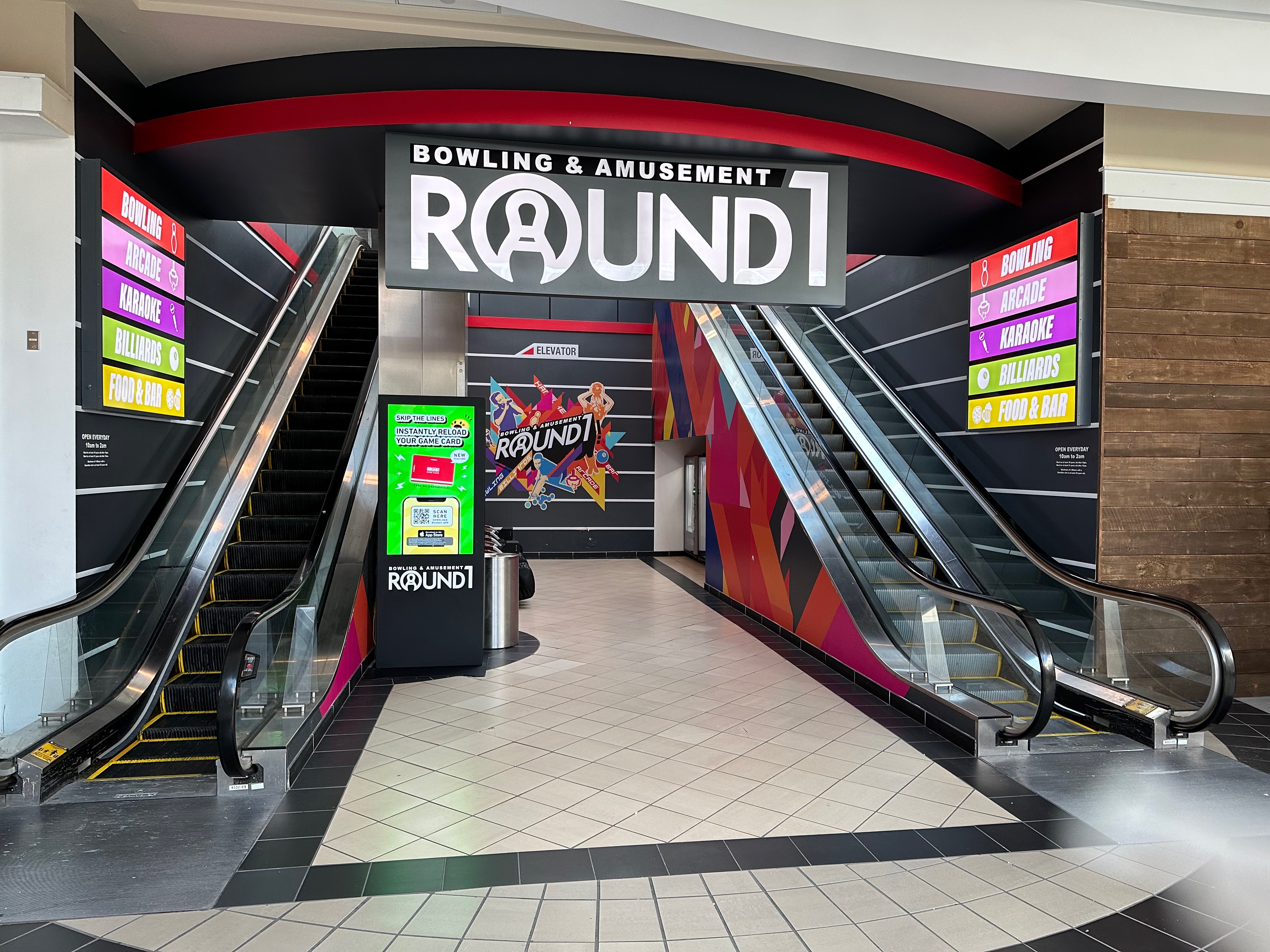
Entrance to Round One at The Maine Mall in South Portland, Maine, United States

In addition to American arcade games, Round One locations in the United States offer many exclusive Japanese arcade games, which is something that other arcades rarely or cannot offer. These include maimai DX CiRCLE PLUS, CHUNITHM PARADISE LOST (offline), beatmania IIDX 34: ZINRAI, Dance Dance Revolution World, Sound Voltex ∇ (read as "Nabla"), Groove Coaster (offline), Wangan Midnight Maximum Tune 5 (addressed as Maximum Tune 5 for its American release; currently released as its updated form Maximum Tune 5DX+), and Initial D Arcade Stage 8. They also exclusively offer the special, golden 20th Anniversary cabinet for Dance Dance Revolution World. Until 2026, Round One and Dave & Buster's were the only two entertainment centers in the United States that served e-AMUSEMENT, an online service integrated into some Konami-related arcade rhythm games under their Bemani division. This changed in 2026, with independent arcades in the United States beginning to receive official games from Konami.

Round One also offers UFO catchers, which is a popular type of claw machine based in Japan.
