= Tokyo Derby (horse race) =

Tokyo Derby 東京ダービー
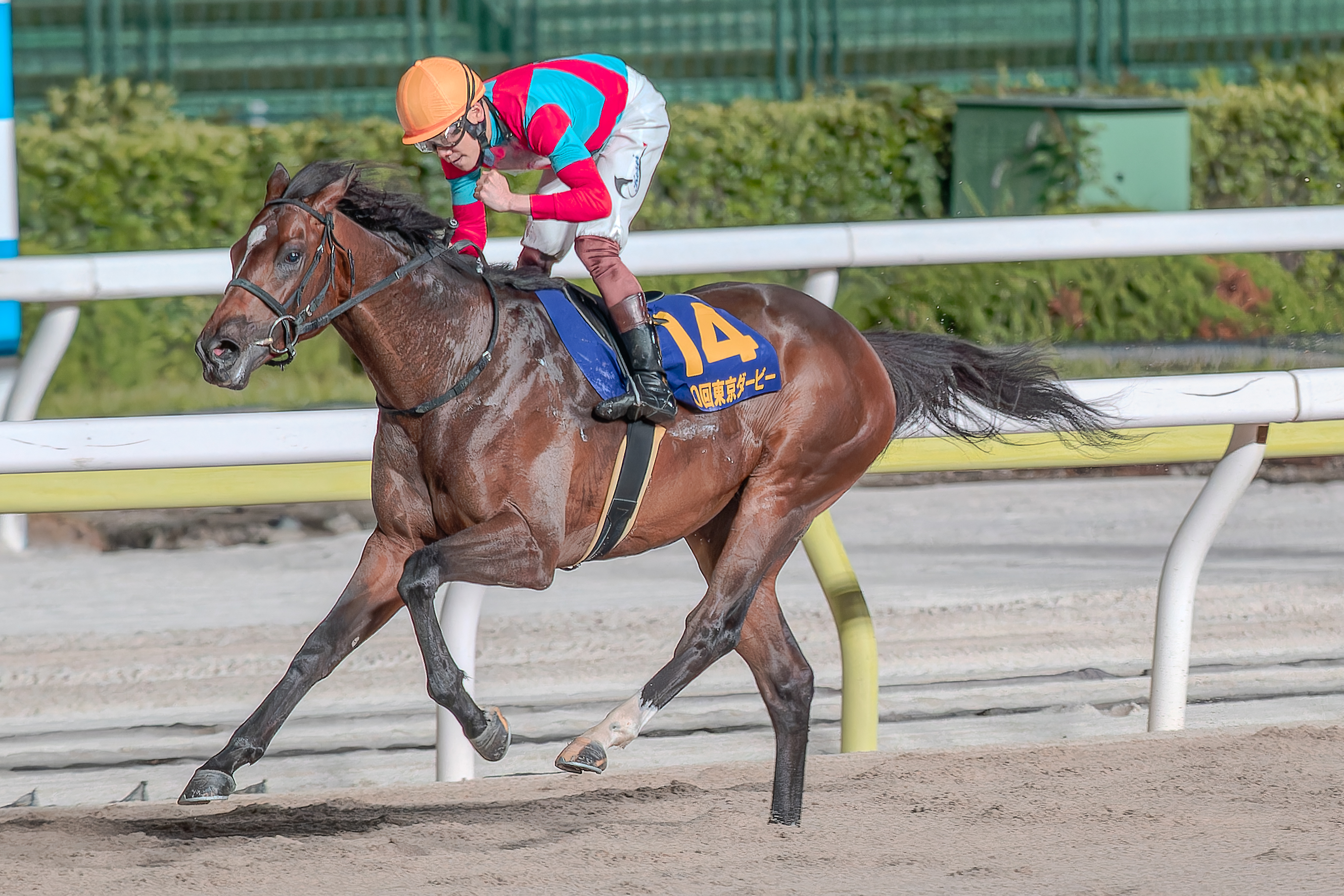
- 2024 Tokyo Derby winner, Ramjet
- Class: Domestic Grade 1 (JpnI); International Listed
- Location: Ohi Racecourse; Shinagawa, Tokyo
- Inaugurated: 15 May 1955 (71 years ago)
- Race type: Thoroughbred

Race information
- Distance: 2,000 meters (About 10 furlongs or 1 1/4 miles)
- Surface: Dirt
- Track: Right-handed
- Qualification: Three-years-old no geldings
- Weight: 57 kg Allowances; 2 kg for fillies 2 kg for S. Hemisphere
- Purse: ¥ 170,000,000 (as of 2026); 1st: ¥ 100,000,000; 2nd: ¥ 35,000,000; 3rd: ¥ 20,000,000
- Bonuses: Triple Crown of Dirt Series; Winner of Haneda Hai, Tokyo Derby and Japan Dirt Classic ¥ 80,000,000

The Tokyo Derby (東京ダービー) is a Japanese Domestic Grade 1 flat race for three year old thoroughbred colts and fillies run over a distance of 2,000 meters (about 10 furlongs) on dirt at Ohi Racecourse in Shinagawa, Tokyo in June.

== History ==
It was first held in 1955, at that time named Haru-no-Kura (春の鞍), meaning 'The Race of Spring race meeting', over a distance of 2000 meters. Its name was changed to Tokyo Metropolis Derby in 1964 and to Tokyo Derby in 1966.

Its distance has been changed three times. From 1955 to 1966, it was run at 2000 meters, then changed to 2400 meters from 1967 to 1998, and since 1999, it has been run at 2000 meters.

Until 2023, this race was the second leg of the South Kanto (南関東; Minami-Kantō) Triple Crown with Haneda Hai and Japan Dirt Derby and only horses belonging to South Kanto Horseracing could run.

=== Dirt Grade Promotion ===
The race was promoted to Domestic Grade 1 along with Haneda Hai in 2024. Formerly the second leg of the South Kanto Triple Crown, it is now the second leg of new Japanese Triple Crown of Dirt. Entries were expanded to 16 horses with 4 horses belonging to Japan Racing Association.

== Trial races ==
Trial races provide automatic berths to the winning horses or placed horses as specified.

| Race Name | Class | Racecourse | Distance | Condition |
|---|---|---|---|---|
| Crown Cup | SIII | Kawasaki | 1,600 meters | Winner |
| Haneda Hai | JpnI | Ohi | 1,800 meters | Three horses that belong to JRA who placed 5th or better. |
| Haneda Hai | JpnI | Ohi | 1,800 meters | Top 3 horses that belong to NAR regardless of placing. |
| Unicorn Stakes | GIII | (Japan) Kyoto | 1,900 meters | Horse(s) that belong to JRA who placed 2nd or better. |
| Unicorn Stakes | GIII | (Japan) Kyoto | 1,900 meters | Top finished horse that belong to NAR regardless of placing. |
| Tokyo Wan Cup | SII | Funabashi | 1,700 meters | Winner |

Races listed below does not provide automatic berths, but still important steps for this race.

| Race Name | Class | Racecourse | Distance | Condition |
|---|---|---|---|---|
| Nishi Nihon Classic | 重賞Ｉ | Sonoda | 1,870 meters | Winner |
| Diamond Cup | M1 | Morioka | 1,800 meters | Winner |
| Tokyo Derby Challenge | OP | Ohi | 2,000 meters | Winner |

== Winners since 1999 ==
| Year | Winner | Jockey | Trainer | Owner | Time |
|---|---|---|---|---|---|
| 1999 | Orion the Thanks (JPN) | Shuji Hayata (JPN) | (Japan) Kiyomatsu Akama (OHI) | Keiko Hiura (JPN) | 2:07.7 |
| 2000 | Hinode Luster (JPN) | Takaharu Kuwajima (JPN) | (Japan) Katsumi Degawa (FUN) | Horseman Hinode Co., Ltd. (JPN) | 2:06.9 |
| 2001 | Toshin Blizzard (JPN) | Takayuki Ishizaki (JPN) | (Japan) Kenji Sato (FUN) | Hironobu Inagaki (JPN) | 2:07.5 |
| 2002 | King Saviour (JPN) | Shinobu Sakai (JPN) | (Japan) Hitoshi Yagi (KAW) | Toshihiko Kiso (JPN) | 2:08.0 |
| 2003 | Nike a Delight (JPN) | Takayuki Ishizaki (JPN) | (Japan) Ryuichi Degawa (FUN) | Sumi Ono (JPN) | 2:08.9 |
| 2004 | Adjudi Mitsuo (JPN) | Takashi Sato (JPN) | (Japan) Masayuki Kawashima (FUN) | Masao Orido (JPN) | 2:05.2 |
| 2005 | Sea Chariot (USA) | Hiroyuki Uchida (JPN) | (Japan) Masayuki Kawashima (FUN) | Darley Japan Racing (JPN) | 2:05.3 |
| 2006 | B. B. Tornado (JPN) | Naoki Machida (JPN) | (Japan) Eiichi Takei (KAW) | Bando Bokujo (JPN) | 2:07.5 |
| 2007 | Ampersand (JPN) | Keita Tosaki (JPN) | (Japan) Takashi Ikeda (KAW) | Hidekazu Date (JPN) | 2:05.0 |
| 2008 | Dream Sky (JPN) | Keita Tosaki (JPN) | (Japan) Katsuyoshi Uchida (KAW) | Dream Turf Co., Ltd. (JPN) | 2:06.5 |
| 2009 | Silent Sutamen (JPN) | Masahiko Kaneko (JPN) | (Japan) Katsuhisa Adachi (KAW) | Shizuo Miyazawa (JPN) | 2:06.7 |
| 2010 | Makani Bisty (JPN) | Keita Tosaki (JPN) | (Japan) Makoto Matsuura (OHI) | Toshiko Bizenjima (JPN) | 2:06.7 |
| 2011 | Clave Secreta (JPN) | Keita Tosaki (JPN) | (Japan) Masayuki Kawashima (FUN) | Sunday Racing (JPN) | 2:06.5 |
| 2012 | Pretiolas (JPN) | Kota Motohashi (JPN) | (Japan) Junpei Morishita (OHI) | Yasuaki Date (JPN) | 2:06.8 |
| 2013 | Inside the Park (JPN) | Seiji Sakai (JPN) | (Japan) Masato Hayashi (FUN) | Yusuke Yamaguchi (JPN) | 2:07.2 |
| 2014 | Happy Sprint (JPN) | Hiroto Yoshihara (JPN) | (Japan) Junpei Morishita (OHI) | Tsuji Bokujo (JPN) | 2:05.9 |
| 2015 | Lucky Prince (JPN) | Tadanari Konno (JPN) | (Japan) Satoshi Kokubo (URA) | Masatada Kunida (JPN) | 2:07.5 |
| 2016 | Baldassare (JPN) | Hiroto Yoshihara (JPN) | (Japan) Keiji Nakamichi (OHI) | Toshiaki Date (JPN) | 2:06.9 |
| 2017 | Higashi Will Win (JPN) | Taito Mori (JPN) | (Japan) Kenji Sato (FUN) | MMC Co., Ltd. (JPN) | 2:06.9 |
| 2018 | Haseno Pyro (JPN) | Takayuki Yano (JPN) | (Japan) Kenji Sato (FUN) | Fumio Hasegawa (JPN) | 2:06.7 |
| 2019 | Hikari Oso (JPN) | Seiji Yamazaki (JPN) | (Japan) Hiroshi Iwamoto (KAW) | Tsuru Nishimori (JPN) | 2:09.4 |
| 2020 | Aime Limite (JPN) | Tatsuya Yamaguchi (JPN) | (Japan) Masato Hayashi (FUN) | Taisei Co., Ltd. (JPN) | 2:06.9 |
| 2021 | Alain Barows (JPN) | Seiji Sakai (JPN) | (Japan) Masato Hayashi (FUN) | Hirotsugu Inokuma (JPN) | 2:06.6 |
| 2022 | Kile (JPN) | Kota Motohashi (JPN) | (Japan) Satoshi Kokubo (URA) | Takaya Shimakawa (JPN) | 2:07.1 |
| 2023 | Mick Fire (JPN) | Norifumi Mikamoto (JPN) | (Japan) Kazuo Watanabe (OHI) | Koichi Hoshika (JPN) | 2:04.8 |
Triple Crown of Dirt Series
| 2024 | Ramjet (JPN) | Kosei Miura (JPN) | (Japan) Shozo Sasaki (JRA) | Koji Maeda (JPN) | 2:06.1 |
| 2025 | Natural Rise (JPN) | Takeshi Yokoyama (JPN) | (Japan) Keizo Ito (JRA) | Hiroyuki Yoshioka (JPN) | 2:03.8 |
| 2026 | Finger (JPN) | Keita Tosaki (JPN) | (Japan) Hiroyasu Tanaka (JRA) | M's Racing (JPN) | 2:04.4 |

== Earlier winners ==
- 1955 – Royal Leather (Lady Fortune)
- 1956 – Otone
- 1957 – Hatsuyuki
- 1958 – Daini Kotobuki
- 1959 – Seisho
- 1960 – Daisan Kotobuki
- 1961 – Yaguchi Hope
- 1962 – Cell Call
- 1963 – Shinnitsukei
- 1964 – Pearl Mountain
- 1965 – Higashi Yuri
- 1966 – Shin O
- 1967 – Hikaru Takai
- 1968 – Wealth Diver
- 1969 – Yamano Taiyo
- 1970 – Ryu Tokitsu
- 1971 – Fuji Prince
- 1972 – Tokiwa Taiyo
- 1973 – Yokozan
- 1974 – Daiei Mond
- 1975 – Golden Ribot
- 1976 – Rocky Line
- 1977 – Sanko Mond
- 1978 – Hatsushiba O
- 1979 – Soul Chateau
- 1980 – Takafuji Minoru
- 1981 – Suzuyu
- 1982 – Daishin Shirayuki
- 1983 – San Oi
- 1984 – King Haiseiko
- 1985 – Mill Koji
- 1986 – Hanaki O
- 1987 – George Rex
- 1988 – Windmill
- 1989 – Rosita
- 1990 – Outrun Seiko
- 1991 – Apollo Pink
- 1992 – Grade Shori
- 1993 – Pleasant
- 1994 – Kanesho Gold
- 1995 – George Taisei
- 1996 – Saint Rick
- 1997 – Surprise Power
- 1998 – Atomic Thunder

== See also ==
- Horse racing in Japan
- List of Japanese flat horse races
