= Monroe Walk =

Japanese racehorse

Monroe Walk モンローウォーク
- Monroe Walk at the Shuka Sho parade ring
- Breed: Thoroughbred
- Sire: Kizuna
- Grandsire: Deep Impact
- Dam: Amphitrite
- Damsire: Sebring
- Sex: Filly
- Country: Japan
- Color: Brown
- Breeder: Northern Farm
- Owner: M's Racing
- Racing colours
- Trainer: Tetsuya Kimura → Hiroyuki Uemura
- Jockey: Keita Tosaki
- Record: 5: 5-0-0
- Earnings: 201,712,000 JPY

Major wins
- Rose Stakes (2026); Shūka Shō (2026)
- Last updated on October 18, 2026

Monroe Walk (Japanese: モンローウォーク, Hepburn: Monrō Uōku; foaled March 10, 2023) is an active Japanese Thoroughbred racehorse best known for winning the 2026 Shūka Shō while undefeated.

She was named after "the way Monroe walks".

== Racing career ==
=== 2025: two year-old season ===
Monroe Walk made her racing debut on August 16, 2025, in a two-year-old newcomer race at Niigata Racecourse under trainer Tetsuya Kimura. Breaking from the innermost gate, she took an early lead and led throughout to win the race. She was subsequently aimed at the Artemis Stakes, but was withdrawn after being diagnosed with a fracture. She was later transferred to Hiroyuki Uemura's stable.

=== 2026: three year-old season ===
Monroe Walk returned to racing after an absence of about 10 months in the Yakumo Tokubetsu, winning comfortably without being fully ridden out. She followed this with a three-length victory in the Kamomejima Tokubetsu, despite the rain-affected track conditions.

On September 13, Monroe Walk made her graded stakes debut in the Rose Stakes, having been transported to the racecourse on the day of the race. She tracked the front runner Fast Forward in second place before pulling clear comfortably when urged forward in the home straight, securing her first graded stakes victory and extending her unbeaten record to four races. She became the second horse to win the Rose Stakes while remaining undefeated, and the first since Fine Motion in 2002, 24 years earlier.

On October 18, Monroe Walk made her Grade 1 debut in the Shūka Shō at Kyoto Racecourse. Ridden by Keita Tosaki and starting as the overwhelming favorite, she raced in fifth position before overtaking Garavogue in the final 100 meters to win by a neck, with Dream Core finishing third. Her winning time of 1:56.1 set a new race record and equaled the course record over 2,000 meters.

The victory extended her unbeaten record to five consecutive wins and made her the fourth horse to win the Shūka Shō while undefeated, following Fine Motion in 2002, Kawakami Princess in 2006, and Daring Tact in 2020. It also marked her first Grade 1 victory and the first Shūka Shō win for trainer Hiroyuki Uemura, while Tosaki secured his second victory in the race, following his win aboard Akaitorino Musume in 2021.

Shuka Sho victory ceremony

Shuka Sho victory ceremony

== Racing statistics ==
Below data is based on data available on JBIS Search, and NetKeiba.

Date	Track	Race	Grade	Distance (Condition)	Entry	HN	Odds (Favored)	Finish	Time	Margins	Jockey	Winner (Runner-up)
2025 – two-year-old season
Oct 16	Niigata	2YO Debut		1,600 m (Firm)	11	1	1.2 (1)	1st	1:35.5	-0.5	Keita Tosaki	(Kiri Mitsu)
2026 – three-year-old season
Jun 14	Hakodate	Yakumo Tokubetsu	1W	1,800 m (Firm)	10	5	1.6 (1)	1st	1:47.8	-0.3	Kazuo Yokoyama	(Dogwood)
Jul 19	Hakodate	Kamomejima Tokubetsu	2W	1,800 m (Yielding)	13	9	1.5 (1)	1st	1:48.4	-0.6	Kazuo Yokoyama	(Astoril)
Sep 13	Hanshin	Rose Stakes	GII	1,800 m (Firm)	12	7	1.9 (1)	1st	1:44.5	-0.5	Keita Tosaki	(Enne)
Oct 18	Kyoto	Shūka Shō	GI	2,000 m (Firm)	17	8	1.3 (1)	1st	R1:56.1	0.0	Keita Tosaki	(Garavogue)

Legend:
Turf

- R indicated that it was a record time finish

== Pedigree ==
Pedigree of Monroe Walk (JPN), Brown filly, 2023
Sire Kizuna br. 2010	Deep Impact b. 2002	Sunday Silence (USA)	Hail to Reason
Sire Kizuna br. 2010	Deep Impact b. 2002	Sunday Silence (USA)	Wishing Well
Sire Kizuna br. 2010	Deep Impact b. 2002	Wind in Her Hair (IRE)	Alzao (USA)
Sire Kizuna br. 2010	Deep Impact b. 2002	Wind in Her Hair (IRE)	Burghclere (GB)
Sire Kizuna br. 2010	Catequil (CAN) b. 1990	Storm Cat USA	Storm Bird CAN
Sire Kizuna br. 2010	Catequil (CAN) b. 1990	Storm Cat USA	Terlingua
Sire Kizuna br. 2010	Catequil (CAN) b. 1990	Pacific Princess (USA)	Damascus
Sire Kizuna br. 2010	Catequil (CAN) b. 1990	Pacific Princess (USA)	Fiji (GB)
Dam Amphitrite (AUS) dk. b. 2015	Sebring ch. 2005	More Than Ready (USA)	Southern Halo
Dam Amphitrite (AUS) dk. b. 2015	Sebring ch. 2005	More Than Ready (USA)	Woodman's Girl
Dam Amphitrite (AUS) dk. b. 2015	Sebring ch. 2005	Purespeed	Flying Spur
Dam Amphitrite (AUS) dk. b. 2015	Sebring ch. 2005	Purespeed	Lady Moulin
Dam Amphitrite (AUS) dk. b. 2015	Ocean Dream b. 2006	Redoute's Choice	Danehill (USA)
Dam Amphitrite (AUS) dk. b. 2015	Ocean Dream b. 2006	Redoute's Choice	Shantha's Choice
Dam Amphitrite (AUS) dk. b. 2015	Ocean Dream b. 2006	Joolzy (NZ)	Noble Bijou (USA)
Dam Amphitrite (AUS) dk. b. 2015	Ocean Dream b. 2006	Joolzy (NZ)	Bon et Vite (Family 17-b)
