= Masahiko Sugino =

Japanese businessman and racehorse owner

- 杉野公彦
- Sugino at the 2026 Diamond Stakes ceremony
- Born: September 20, 1961 (age 65); Osaka Prefecture, Japan
- Education: Momoyama Gakuin University
- Known for: Business magnate Racehorse Owner

Masahiko Sugino (杉野公彦) is a Japanese businessman who founded Round One Corporation.

== Career ==
While attending the university, he took over the roller skating rink run by his father, and founded Sugino Kosan Co. Ltd. in December 1980. In 1993 he founded Round One and became the CEO of that company, and in the following year he had Round One merge with Sugino Kosan before renaming the latter to Round One.

== As a racehorse owner ==
In addition to his career, he is also the owner of several grade winning racehorses, with him using the registrant name "M's Racing".

- Harper (2023 Daily Hai Queen Cup)
- Finger (2026 Bluebird Cup, 2026 Haneda Hai & 2026 Tokyo Derby)
- Stinger Glass (2026 Diamond Stakes)
- Monroe Walk (2026 Rose Stakes & 2026 Shuka Sho)
