= Japan Dirt Classic =

Japan Dirt Classic ジャパンダートクラシック
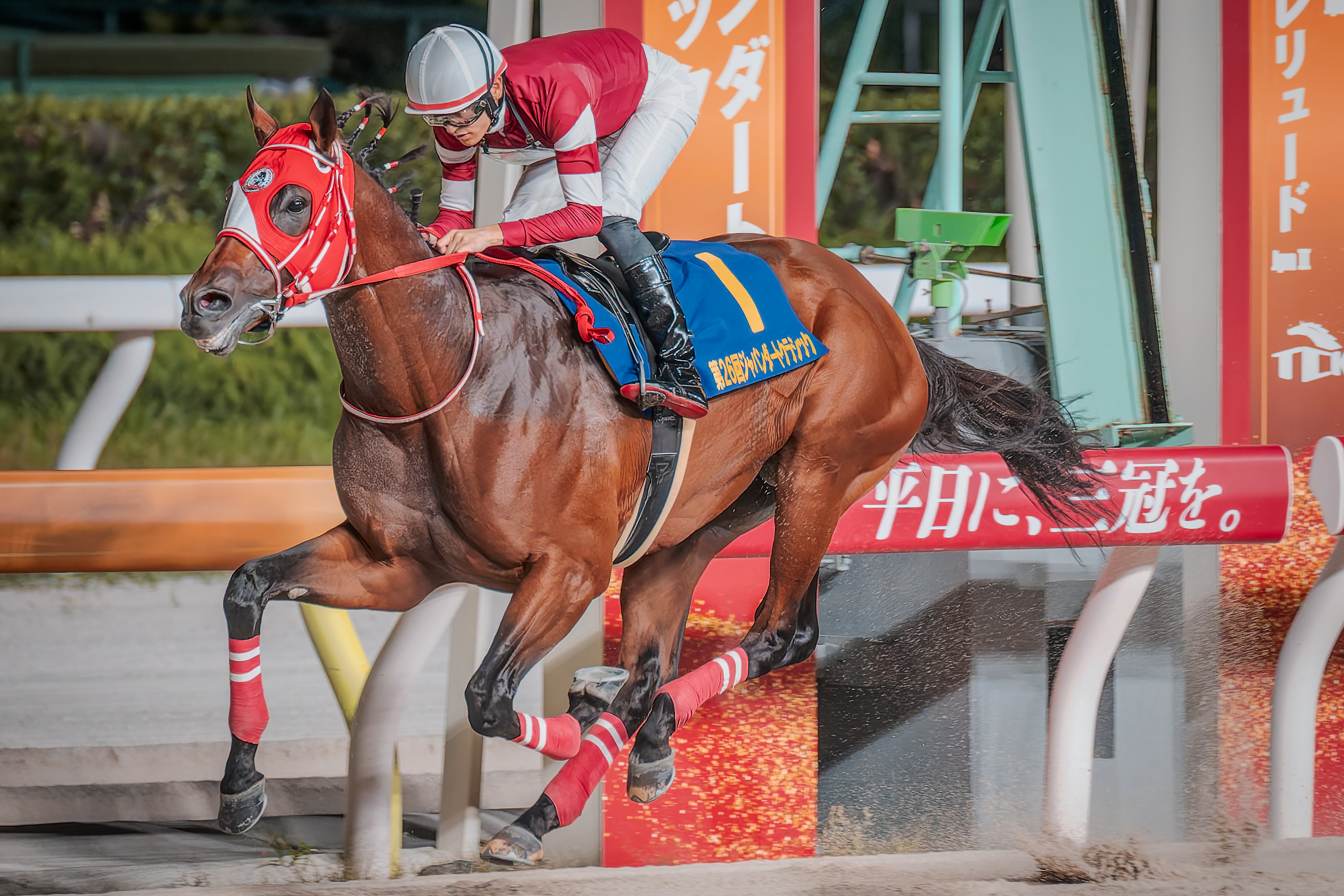
- 2024 Japan Dirt Classic winner, Forever Young
- Class: Domestic Grade 1 (JpnI); International Listed
- Location: Ohi Racecourse; Shinagawa, Tokyo
- Inaugurated: 8 July 1999 (27 years ago)
- Race type: Thoroughbred

Race information
- Distance: 2000 meters (About 10 furlongs or 1 1/4 miles)
- Surface: Dirt
- Track: Right-handed
- Qualification: Three-years-old no geldings
- Weight: 57 kg Allowances; 2 kg for fillies 2 kg for S. Hemisphere
- Purse: ¥ 119,000,000 (as of 2025); 1st: ¥ 70,000,000; 2nd: ¥ 24,500,000; 3rd: ¥ 14,000,000
- Bonuses: Triple Crown of Dirt Series; Winner of Haneda Hai, Tokyo Derby and Japan Dirt Classic ¥ 80,000,000; Winner of the U.S. Triple Crown ¥ 30,000,000; Winner of any international G1 race, UAE Derby or Saudi Derby ¥ 20,000,000

The Japan Dirt Classic (ジャパンダートクラシック) is Japanese Domestic Grade 1 flat race for three year old thoroughbred colts and fillies run over a distance of 2,000 meters (approximately 1 mile 2 furlongs) at the Ohi Racecourse, Shinagawa, Tokyo in early October. It is the third and final leg of the Japanese Triple Crown of Dirt.

== History ==
The race was first run in 1999 as the Japan Dirt Derby and was the Japanese equivalent of the American Kentucky Derby, though the race was the last leg of Triple Crown of South Kanto (南関東; Minami-Kantō) Horseracing, while the Kentucky Derby is the first race of American Triple Crown.

The majority of winners come from the Japan Racing Association (JRA), another Japanese horse racing governing body, as the JRA does not host any Grade 1 dirt races exclusively for 3-year-old horses.

In June 2022, it was announced that from 2024 that it would become the third leg of the Japanese Triple Crown of Dirt along with the Haneda Hai and the Tokyo Derby. The name of the race was changed to the Japan Dirt Classic, and the race scheduling was moved from July to October. Geldings are no longer able to enter, and the prize money for 1st place was increased to 70,000,000 yen.

== Trial races ==
Trial races provide automatic berths to the winning horses or placed horses as specified.

Race Name	Class	Racecourse	Distance	Condition
Leopard Stakes	GIII	(Japan) Niigata	1,800 meters	Winner
Kuroshio Hai	SIII	Ohi	1,800 meters	Top 2 horses
Kozukata Sho	JpnII	Morioka	2,000 meters	Winner

== Winners since 1999 ==
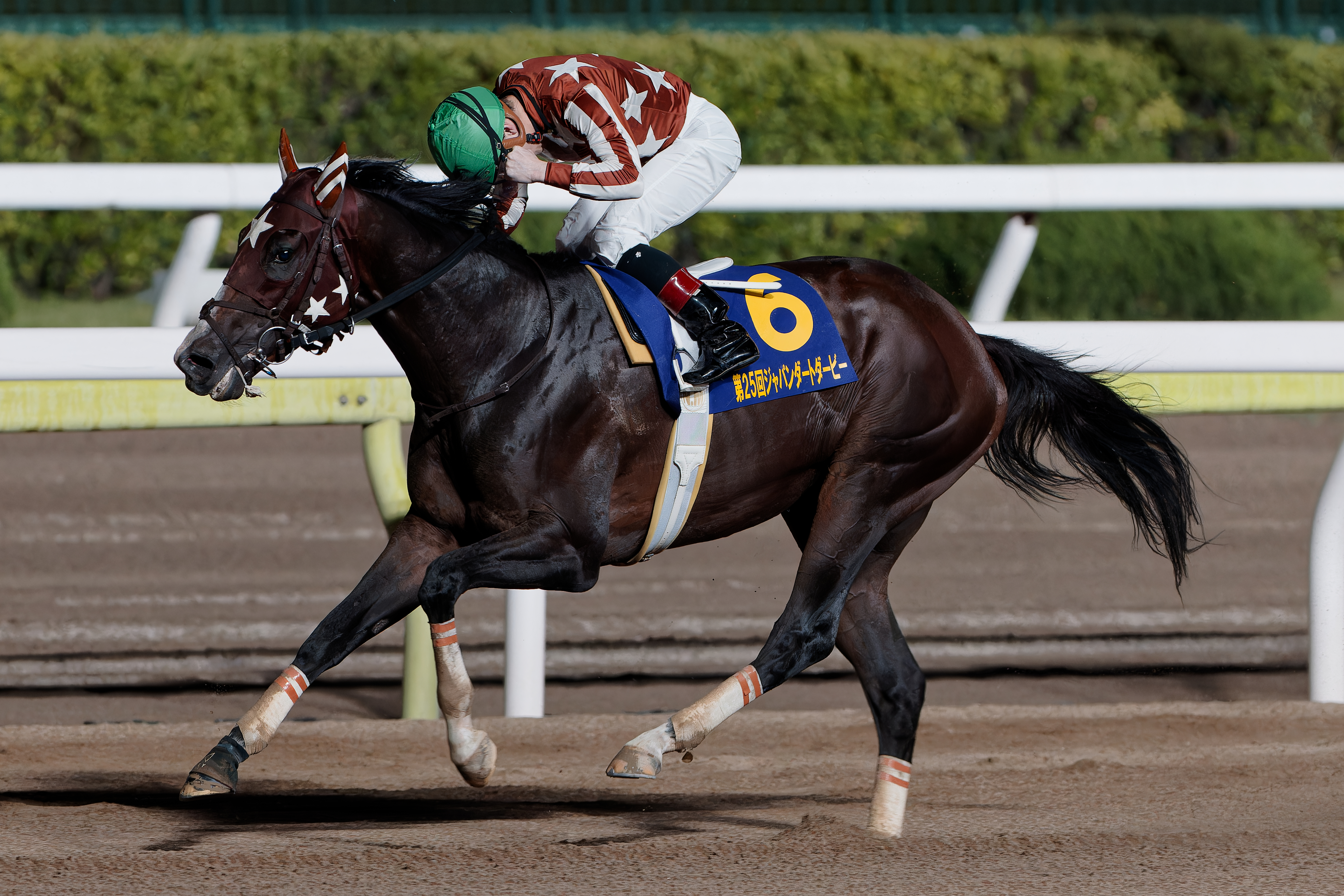
Mick Fire, the last winner of Japan Dirt Derby, ridden by Norifumi Mikamoto.

Year	Winner	Jockey	Trainer	Owner	Time
1999	Orion the Thanks (JPN)	Shuji Hayata (JPN)	(Japan) Kiyomatsu Akama (OHI)	Keiko Hiura (JPN)	2:06.9
2000	Meiner Combat (JPN)	Naohiro Onishi (JPN)	(Japan) Ryuichi Inaba (JRA)	Thoroughbred Club Ruffian (JPN)	2:06.4
2001	Toshin Blizzard (JPN)	Takayuki Ishizaki (JPN)	(Japan) Kenji Sato (FUN)	Hironobu Inagaki (JPN)	2:05.8
2002	Gold Allure (JPN)	Yutaka Take (JPN)	(Japan) Yasuo Ikee (JRA)	Shadai Race Horse Co., Ltd. (JPN)	2:04.1
2003	Big Wolf (JPN)	Yutaka Take (JPN)	(Japan) Tadashi Nakao (JRA)	Big Co., Ltd. (JPN)	2:04.9
2004	Cafe Olympus (USA)	Yoshitomi Shibata (JPN)	(Japan) Yasuhisa Matsuyama (JRA)	Kiyoshi Nishikawa (JPN)	2:04.5
2005	Kane Hekili (JPN)	Yutaka Take (JPN)	(Japan) Katsuhiko Sumii (JRA)	Kaneko Makoto Holdings (JPN)	2:04.9
2006	Friendship (JPN)	Hiroyuki Uchida (JPN)	(Japan) Katsuhiko Sumii (JRA)	Teruya Yoshida (JPN)	2:06.1
2007	Furioso (JPN)	Tadanari Konno (JPN)	(Japan) Masayuki Kawashima (FUN)	Darley Japan Racing (JPN)	2:02.9
2008	Success Brocken (JPN)	Norihiro Yokoyama (JPN)	(Japan) Hideaki Fujiwara (JRA)	Tetsu Takashima (JPN)	2:04.5
2009	Testa Matta (USA)	Yasunari Iwata (JPN)	(Japan) Akira Murayama (JRA)	Kazumi Yoshida (JPN)	2:04.5
2010	Magnifica (JPN)	Keita Tosaki (JPN)	(Japan) Masayuki Kawashima (FUN)	Teruya Yoshida (JPN)	2:05.2
2011	Grape Brandy (JPN)	Norihiro Yokoyama (JPN)	(Japan) Takayuki Yasuda (JRA)	Shadai Race Horse Co., Ltd. (JPN)	2:04.9
2012	Hatano Vainqueur (JPN)	Hirofumi Shii (JPN)	(Japan) Mitsugu Kon (JRA)	Good Luck Farm Co., Ltd. (JPN)	2:05.3
2013	Chrysolite (JPN)	Hiroyuki Uchida (JPN)	(Japan) Hidetaka Otonashi (JRA)	Carrot Farm Co., Ltd. (JPN)	2:04.8
2014	Kazenoko (JPN)	Shinichiro Akiyama (JPN)	(Japan) Kenji Nonaka (JRA)	Koji Nudejima (JPN)	2:03.9
2015	Nonkono Yume (JPN)	Christophe Lemaire (FR)	(Japan) Yukihiro Kato (JRA)	Kazumasa Yamada (JPN)	2:05.6
2016	Kyoei Gere (JPN)	Keita Tosaki (JPN)	(Japan) Yoshito Yahagi (JRA)	Haruo Tanaka (JPN)	2:05.7
2017	Higashi Will Win (JPN)	Masashige Honda (JPN)	(Japan) Kenji Sato (FUN)	MMC Co., Ltd. (JPN)	2:05.8
2018	Le Vent Se Leve (JPN)	Mirco Demuro (ITA)	(Japan) Kiyoshi Hagiwara (JRA)	G1 Racing (JPN)	2:05.8
2019	Chrysoberyl (JPN)	Yuga Kawada (JPN)	(Japan) Hidetaka Otonashi (JRA)	Carrot Farm Co., Ltd. (JPN)	2:06.1
2020	Danon Pharaoh (JPN)	Ryusei Sakai (JPN)	(Japan) Yoshito Yahagi (JRA)	Danox Co., Ltd. (JPN)	2:05.9
2021	Castle Top (JPN)	Kazuma Nakano (JPN)	(Japan) Nobuhiro Shibuya (FUN)	Hiroshi Joichi (JPN)	2:05.9
2022	Notturno (JPN)	Yutaka Take (JPN)	(Japan) Hidetaka Otonashi (JRA)	Kaneko Makoto Holdings (JPN)	2:04.6
2023	Mick Fire (JPN)	Norifumi Mikamoto (JPN)	(Japan) Kazuo Watanabe (OHI)	Koichi Hoshika (JPN)	2:04.6
Triple Crown of Dirt Series
2024	Forever Young (JPN)	Ryusei Sakai (JPN)	(Japan) Yoshito Yahagi (JRA)	Susumu Fujita (JPN)	2:04.1
2025	Narukami (JPN)	Keita Tosaki (JPN)	(Japan) Hiroyasu Tanaka (JRA)	Godolphin (UAE)	2:03.7
2026	Silver Ratio (JPN)	Takeshi Yokoyama (JPN)	(Japan) Kenji Nonaka (JRA)	Sunday Racing (JPN)	2:04.0

== Records ==
Leading jockey(s) :

- 4 – Yutaka Take : Gold Allure (2002), Big Wolf (2003), Kane Hekili (2005), Notturno (2022)

Leading trainer(s) :

- 3 – Hidetaka Otonashi : Chrysolite (2013), Chrysoberyl (2019), Notturno (2022)
- 3 – Yoshito Yahagi : Kyoei Gere (2016), Danon Pharaoh (2020), Forever Young (2024)

Leading owner(s) :

- 2 – Shadai Race Horse : Kane Hekili (2005), Notturno (2022)
- 2 – Kaneko Makoto Holdings : Gold Allure (2002), Grape Brandy (2011)
- 2 – Carrot Farm : Chrysolite (2013), Chrysoberyl (2019)

- Fastest winning time : 2:02.9 – Furioso (2007)
- Slowest winning time : 2:06.9 – Orion the Thanks (1999)

== See also ==
- Horse racing in Japan
- List of Japanese flat horse races
