= Keita Tosaki =

Japanese jockey (born 1980)

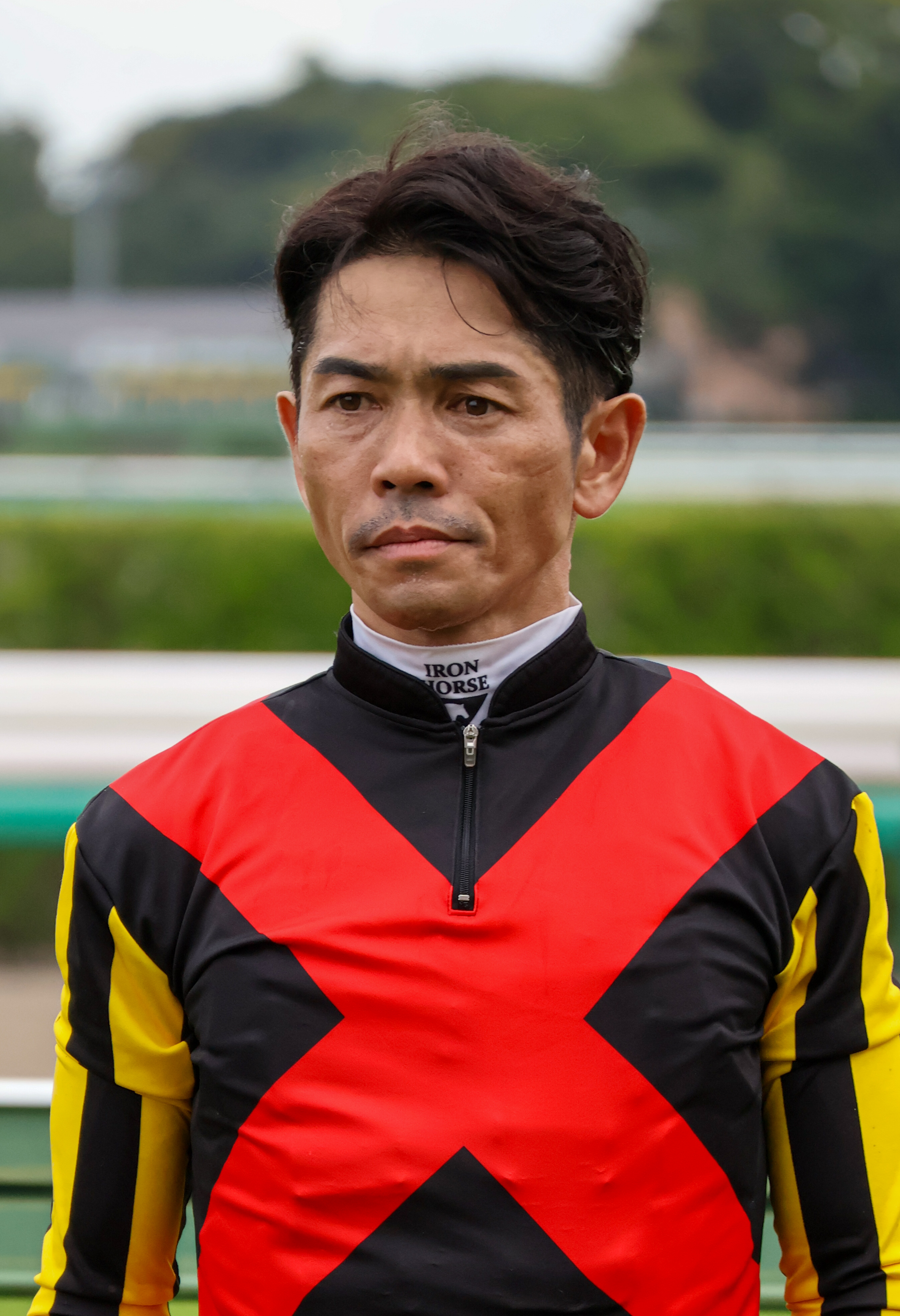
- Keita Tosaki at the 2025 St Lite Kinen

Personal information
- Native name: 戸崎圭太
- Nationality: Japanese
- Born: July 8, 1980 (age 46) Mibu, Tochigi, Japan
- Occupation: Jockey
- Height: 160 cm (5 ft 3 in)
- Weight: 49 kg (108 lb)

Horse racing career
- Sport: Horse racing
- Career wins: 1585 (JRA); 2436 (NAR)

Racing awards
- NAR Grand Prix Best Fair Play Award (2006); NAR Grand Prix Best Jockey Award (2008); NAR Grand Prix for Best Jockey (Races Won) (2009-12); NAR Grand Prix for Best Jockey (Money Earned) (2009-12); NAR Grand Prix Grand Prize Jockey (2011); JRA Award for Most Valuable Jockey (2014-16, 2022, 2024); JRA Award for Best Jockey (Races Won) (2014-16)

Significant horses
- Furioso, Real Impact, Gentildonna, Straight Girl, Epoca d'Oro, Chuwa Wizard, Akaitorino Musume, Songline, Justin Milano, Danon Decile, Regaleira

Keita Tosaki (Japanese: 戸崎圭太, Hepburn: Tosaki Keita); born July 8, 1980) is a Japanese jockey born in Mibu, Tochigi.

== Profile ==
Tosaki started his career as a jockey for the Ohi Racecourse, part of the National Association of Racing, in 1998. He rode and won his first race on April 12 of that year, when he rode Miyasan Yashima to victory.

Tosaki rode his first JRA race on June 26, 2005, when he rode Spring Lagos at a maiden race in Fukushima Racecourse, who finished at 10th place. He won his first JRA race on July 8, 2007, which also happened to be on his 27th birthday, at Hanshin Racecourse with Yamakatsu Tigger.

Tosaki rode his first JRA graded race with Sea Chariot at the 2007 March Stakes, where he finished 14th.

Tosaki won his first Dirt Grade Race in 2008 when he won the Diolite Kinen with Furioso. He later went on to win the Tokyo Derby with Dream Sky for the second year in a row after he won the 2007 race with Ampersand. He also won his first JpnI race with Furioso on that year's Teio Sho with Furioso. These wins contributed to him being named the Best Jockey of the Year in the 2008 NAR Grand Prix.

On March 25, 2009, Tosaki won his 1,000th NAR victory after winning the Keihin Hai with Nike High Grade.

In 2010, Tosaki won his third Tokyo Derby with Makani Bisty. On June 30, Tosaki won the Teio Sho with Furioso for the second time, beating JRA horses such as Kane Hekili, Vermilion, Success Brocken, and Bonneville Record. Tosaki also won his first JRA graded race with Glorious Noah when they won the Musashino Stakes.

Tosaki won his first JRA Grade I race when he won the Yasuda Kinen with Real Impact in 2011.

Tosaki won his 2,000th NAR victory with Greco, when they won a race at Funabashi Racecourse on March 14, 2012.

Tosaki transferred from Ohi to JRA from March 1, 2013 after earning a JRA jockey license earlier that year. Tosaki had earned his JRA license on his third attempt. Following this, he has

Tosaki won his first post-transfer JRA Grade Race with Best Warrior. Tosaki won the Golden Jockey Cup held at Sonoda Racecourse on December 12.

In 2014, Tosaki became the JRA leading jockey, with his major win including Gentildonna at the Arima Kinen.

Tosaki won his first race abroad while participating in the Longines International Jockey Championship held at Happy Valley Racecourse in Hong Kong on December 9, 2015, where he rode True Comment and finished in a dead heat. He ultimately finished the championship at third place after earning a total of 13 points.

In 2016, Tosaki became the JRA leading jockey for the third year, and for the first time in JRA history without earning a single penalty point.

On June 29, 2019, Tosaki won an allowance race with Ecris l'Histoire, which became his 1,000th JRA victory.

On November 4, 2019, Tosaki suffered a fall during the JBC Ladies' Classic held at Urawa Racecourse, resulting in him an open fracture of his right elbow, taking him out of the race for six months. He returned to racing in late May of the following year.

Tosaki won his first win after his fall on August 16, 2020, at the Sekiya Kinen held at Niigata Racecourse with Satono Arthur. Later that year, on December 6, he won his first dirt Grade I race with Chuwa Wizard at the Champions Cup.

On February 20, 2021, Tosaki won the Saudi Derby with Pink Kamehameha substituting for Joel Rosario, who was originally supposed to ride the horse but was barred from entering Saudi Arabia. He followed this victory up by finishing second in the Riyadh Dirt Sprint riding Matera Sky behind another Japanese-trained horse, Copano Kicking. However, he and Chuwa Wizard finished 9th in the main race of that day, the Saudi Cup. One month later, Tosaki participated in that year's Dubai World Cup Night with Matera Sky and Chuwa Wizard. He rode Matera Sky in the Dubai Golden Shaheen, who finished 12th, but finished second at the Dubai World Cup, which was the best performance for a Japanese-trained horse in that race since 2011.

On January 20, 2024, Tosaki achieved the 52th jockey ever to have had 10,000th starts in a JRA race when he raced a maiden race at Nakayama Racecourse with Lien du Miracle, and later won his 1,500th JRA victory after winning the Sagamiko Tokubetsu held at Tokyo Racecourse with Omega Wing on June 16. That same year, he won the Satsuki Shō with Justin Milano. Following the victory, he commented in a post-race interview while in tears, referring to the horse's former training partner Kota Fujioka who had died in a racing accident a week prior, that "Fujioka told me a lot about the horse's conditions. I think Kota gave us the last push and is very happy about it. I just wanted to say 'thank you Kota. You did well'". On December 22, Tosaki rode Regaleira on the Arima Kinen as her main jockey, Christophe Lemaire, had opted to ride Urban Chic for that race. After going neck and neck against Shahryar, Regaleira beat the horse by a nose, becoming the first three-year-old filly to win the race since Star Roch did in 1960, and Tosaki himself won his second Arima since Gentildonna in 2014.

On January 26, 2025, Tosaki rode Danon Decile for the American Jockey Club Cup as the horse's main jockey, Norihiro Yokoyama, was to ride Matenro Leo for that race. In that race, Matenro Leo and Cosmo Kuranda contested the lead in the final stretch, before Danon Decile passed both horses from the outside, winning the race. This was the first time since Special Week in 1999 where the Derby winner from the previous year won the race. On March 22, Tosaki became the 17th jockey ever to win 1,600 JRA races following him winning the Flower Cup with Lesedrama. On April 5, Tosaki won his first Grade I race abroad with Danon Decile at the Dubai Sheema Classic.

== Major wins ==
=== Japan ===
- Arima Kinen - (2) - Gentildonna (2014), Regaleira (2024)
- Champions Cup - (1) - Chuwa Wizard (2020)
- Hanshin Juvenile Fillies - (1) - Red Reveur (2013)
- Japan Dirt Derby - (2) - Magnifica (2010), Kyoei Gear (2016)
- Kashiwa Kinen - (2) - Furioso (2008, 2010)
- Kawasaki Kinen - (1) - Furioso (2011)
- Mile Championship Nambu Hai - (1) - Best Warrior (2014)
- Queen Elizabeth II Cup - Regaleira (2025)
- Satsuki Shō - (2) - Epoca d'Oro (2018), Justin Milano (2024)
- Shuka Sho - (2) - Akaitorino Musume (2021), Monroe Walk (2026)
- Sprinters Stakes - (1) - Straight Girl (2015)
- Teio Sho - (3) - Furioso (2008, 2010), Mikki Fight (2026)
- Tennō Shō (Autumn) (1) - Danon Decile (2026)
- Victoria Mile - (3) - Straight Girl (2015, 2016), Songline (2023)
- Yasuda Kinen - (2) - Real Impact (2011), Songline (2023)
- Zen-Nippon Nisai Yushun - (2) - Sound Sky (2015), Dry Stout (2021)

=== United Arab Emirates ===
- Dubai Sheema Classic - (1) - Danon Decile (2025)
