= Hiroyasu Tanaka (jockey) =

Japanese businessman and racehorse owner

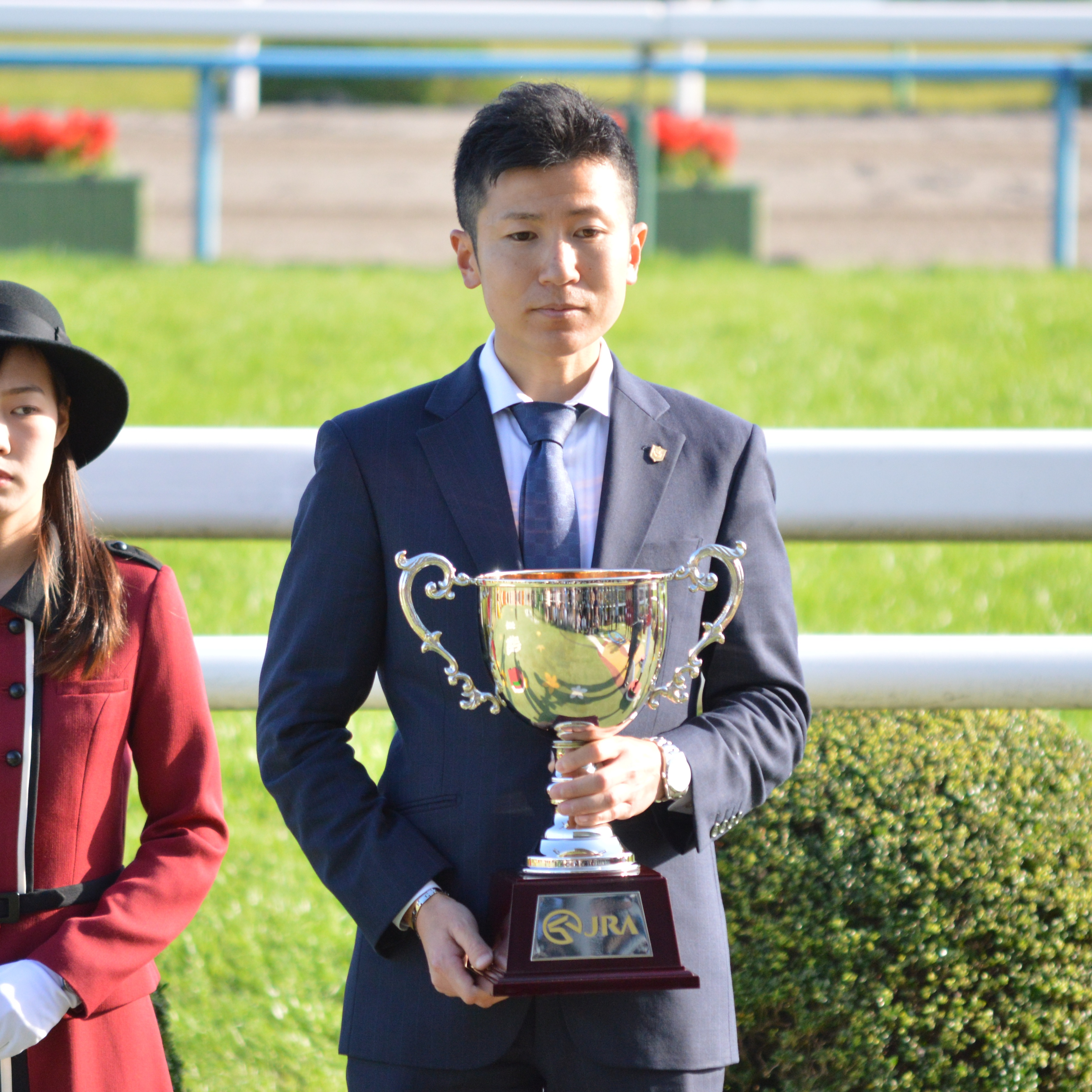
- Tanaka in 2018

Personal information
- Native name: 田中博康
- Born: December 5, 1985 (age 40) Niiza, Saitama, Japan

Horse racing career
- Sport: Horse racing

Significant horses
- Queen Spumante, Lemon Pop, Mikki Fight, Narukami, Sixpence

Hiroyasu Tanaka (田中博康) is a retired Japanese jockey and current racehorse trainer.

== Career ==
In 2024, he became the trainer with the highest winning percentage in the JRA Awards with a winning percentage of 0.239, and also won the JRA Award for Outstanding Technical Trainer for the first time, which is determined by winning percentage, number of wins per stable, prize money earned, and number of races started.

== Major wins as a jockey ==
- Queen Spumante (2009 Queen Elizabeth II Cup)

== Major wins as a trainer ==
- Lemon Pop (2023 February Stakes, 2023 and 2024 Champions Cup, 2023 and 2024 Mile Championship Nambu Hai)
- Mikki Fight (2025 Teio Sho, 2025 Japan Breeding Farms' Cup Classic)
- Narukami (2025 Japan Dirt Classic)
- Sixpence (2026 Yasuda Kinen)
