= Byzantine Dream =

Japanese thoroughbred racehorse

Byzantine Dream; ビザンチンドリーム
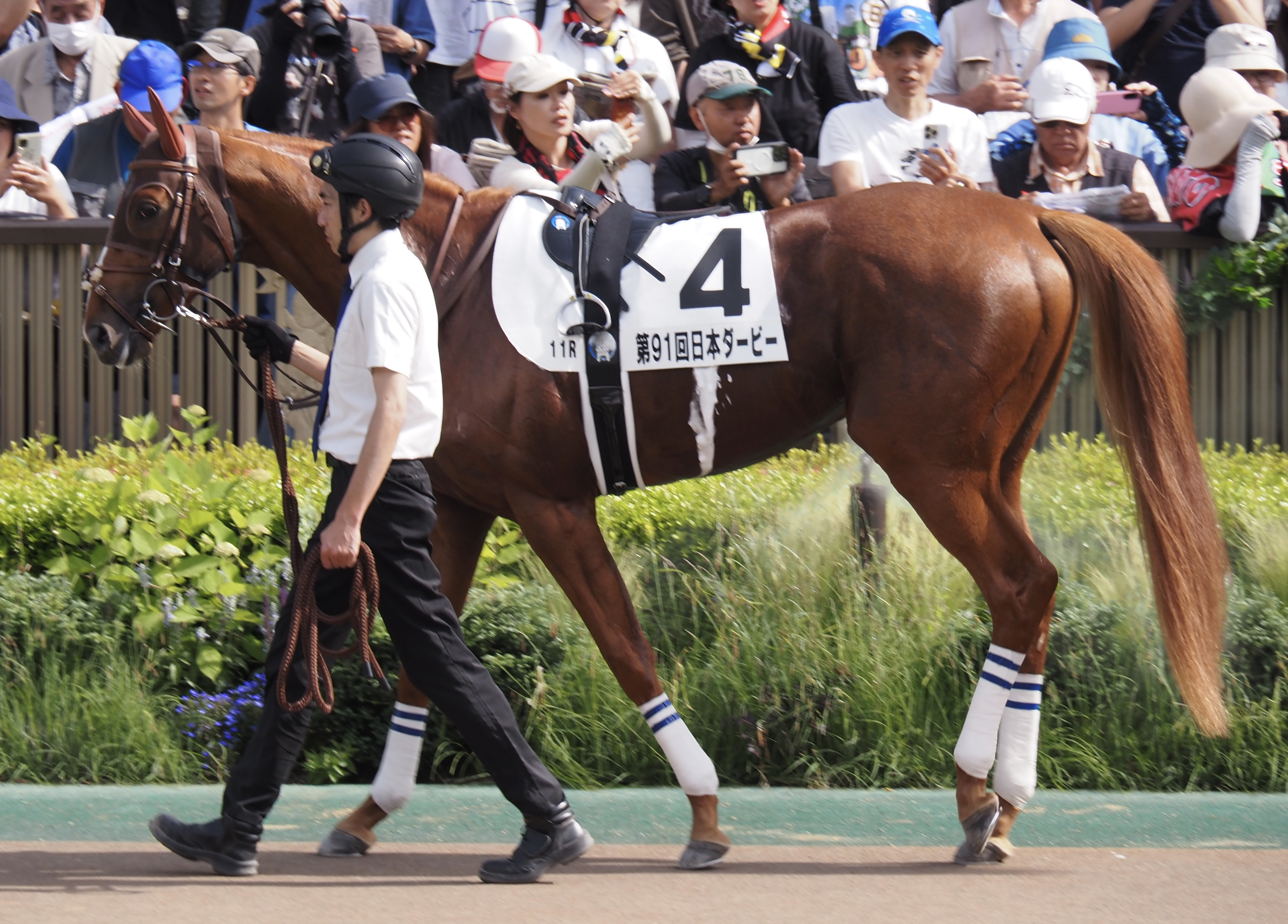
- Byzantine Dream at the 2024 Japanese Derby
- Breed: Thoroughbred
- Sire: Epiphaneia
- Grandsire: Symboli Kris S
- Dam: Japoni Chara
- Damsire: Jungle Pocket
- Sex: Stallion
- Foaled: January 28, 2021
- Country: Japan
- Colour: Chestnut
- Breeder: Northern Farm
- Owner: Kazumi Yoshida
- Racing colours
- Trainer: Tomoyasu Sakaguchi
- Jockey: Oisin Murphy
- Record: 14: 4-1-0
- Earnings: ¥459,449,700

Major wins
- Kisaragi Sho (GIII, 2024); Red Sea Turf Handicap (GII, 2025); Prix Foy (GII, 2025)
- Last updated on June 14, 2026

Byzantine Dream (Japanese: ビザンチンドリーム, foaled January 28, 2021) is an active Japanese thoroughbred racehorse. His major wins include the 2024 Kisaragi Sho, the 2025 Red Sea Turf Handicap, and the 2025 Prix Foy.

== Background ==
Byzantine Dream's sire is Epiphaneia, who won the 2013 Kikuka Sho and the 2014 Japan Cup. Epiphanea came second in the 2014 World's Best Racehorse Rankings and JRA Award for Best Older Male Horse, being beaten by 2014 Autumn Tenno Sho winner Just A Way. Epiphaneia's pedigree includes many famous Japanese racehorses such as Symboli Kris S, Special Week and Maruzensky, and American and Canadian horses such as Sunday Silence, Hail to Reason and Northern Dancer.

Byzantine Dream's dam, Japoni Chara, did not have a notable racing career, however her sire was 2001 Japanese Derby and Japan Cup winner Jungle Pocket.

== Racing career ==
=== 2023: two-year-old season ===
On December 2, 2023, Byzantine Dream made his debut in the a race for 2-year-old maiden horses over 2000 metres on turf at Hanshin Racecourse. He was ridden by jockey Bauyrzhan Murzabayev, and won over A Shin Bonaparte by three lengths. This was his first and only race as a two-year-old.

=== 2024: three-year-old season ===
Byzantine Dream's three-year-old season began with his first graded race in the GIII Kisaragi Sho. He had a slow start, tracked in second-to-last place during the race, and in the stretch, he responded to encouragement from the jockey's whip and began to accelerate. The race ended with a three-way photo finish between Shivers, Water Licht and Byzantine Dream. It was deliberated that Byzantine Dream had won by a nose, marking both the horse's and jockey, René Piechulek's, first JRA graded race victory. This also marked the first JRA flat graded race victory for trainer Tomoyasu Sakaguchi.

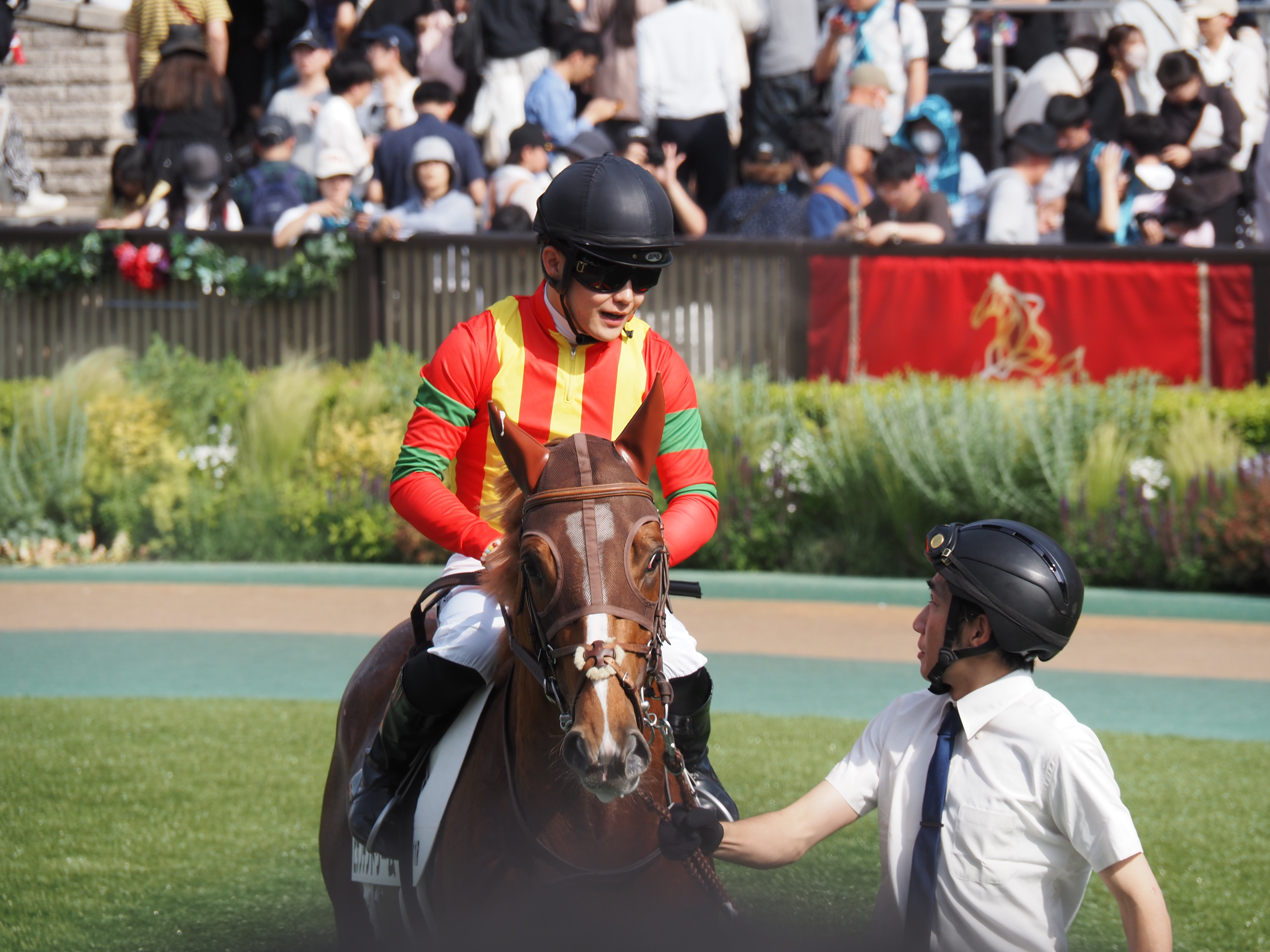
Byzantine Dream and Atsuya Nishimura at the Japanese Derby

With the momentum of being undefeated in two races, he ran in the Satsuki Sho, but a slow start and setbacks in the straight caused him to finish 13th. In the following Tokyo Yushun, he raced with a new partnership with jockey Atsuya Nishimura. However, he ended up in last place, finishing 17th.

After taking a break from late May to September, he ran in the Kobe Shimbun Hai on 22 September. He boldly tried to make a move from the outside, but the slightly heavy track and slow pace worked against him, and he finished sixth. In the following Kikuka Sho, he ran with Andreas Starke as his jockey. Despite a race with frequent lead changes, he calmly made a late charge and finished fifth.

=== 2025: four-year-old season ===
Byzantine Dream's four-year-old season began with the American Jockey Club Cup. He ran in combination with jockey Aurélien Lemaitre, and despite making a determined effort to catch up from the rear, he finished in sixth place.

Byzantine Dream next competed in the Red Sea Turf Handicap on Saudi Cup Day, having accepted the invitation. He was ridden by Oisin Murphy. He had a good start from the widest gate, stayed back during the race, and gradually advanced from the fourth corner. Around 200 meters from the finish, he took the lead and won decisively, holding off the challengers, marking his second graded race victory and his third career win, the first since last year's Kisaragi Sho.

On May 4th, he ran in the Tenno Sho (Spring) with Starke for the first time since the Kikuka Sho. During the race, he stayed in the middle-to-rear of the pack and, in the final straight, swung to the outside to make a late surge, but fell just short in second place, a head behind Hedentor who had broken away earlier.

On June 28, Byzantine Dream's trainer Sakaguchi, announced that they would challenge the Prix de l'Arc de Triomphe to be held at Longchamp Racecourse on October 5, and also announced that the horse would run in the Prix Foy at the same racecourse on September 7 as a prep race.

On September 7 he ran in the Prix Foy with Oisin Murphy. Among the nine horses in the race were strong competitors such as Sosie, who had won the Prix Ganay and Prix d'Ispahan earlier that year, Los Angeles, last year's Irish Derby winner, and Iridessa, who has previously won this race twice and finished second and third once each. Byzantine Dream was ranked as the sixth favourite out of nine. At the start, he rose slightly and fell behind, settling toward the inside at the rear. He strategically advanced from sixth place, and in the final straight, he smoothly moved up from the inside, overcoming the battle with Sottsass, and won by a half-length. This marked his second overseas GI victory after the Red Sea Turf Handicap. Moreover, as a result of this win, he jumped to third favourite in the bookmakers' pre-sale odds for the Prix de l'Arc de Triomphe with odds of around 10 to 1.

The Prix de l'Arc de Triomphe is considered as one of the world's most prestigious horse races. Factors that can make it challenging for Japanese-trained horses in this race, besides the level of competition, include the track conditions, which differ in nature from those in Japan, the demanding weight assignments, crowded fields, and the elevation changes.

On the day of the Prix de l'Arc de Triomphe, Byzantine Dream started slowly with Oisin Murphy as his jockey. Throughout the race, he maintained his usual style of staying towards the rear until the final stretch, and came fifth, being narrowly defeated by Sosie and Giavellotto.

=== 2026: five-year-old season ===
Byzantine Dream is scheduled to run in the G2 Amir Trophy in Doha. On the race day, the horse who was jockeyed by Cristian Demuro, dwelt the start and race majorly at the back of the pack. He edged to the left to get the outside track on the final spurt but failed to made an impression, finished in seventh-place at the line. When he backed to Japan, he ran at the Takarazuka Kinen. In the race, Nishimura failed to propelled him well enough along the race as they stayed at the back pack throughout the race, ended in 15th-place.

He was rested and resumed his season at the Copa Republica Argentina in November. His trainer, Sakaguchi, was impressed and thought the training for the race was completed well. Riding as a sixth favourite and with a 59.5 kg handicap, one of the heaviest on the day, it hampered its performance as he never able to improve his position, tailed away at the back and arrived in 13th on the line. His jockey, Kokubun Yusaku, said that the horse was in rhythm during the race and he felt the horse might pull away on the straight, but the horse slowed down instead due to the final uphill on the homestretch.

== Racing record ==
Data sourced from Netkeiba and JBIS. All data as of November 8, 2026.

Date	Race	Grade	Distance (condition)	Track	Finish	Field	Jockey	1st Place (2nd Place)
2 Dec 2023	2 Year Old Debut		2000 (Good)	Hanshin	1	12	Bauyrzhan Murzabayev	(A Shin Bonaparte)
4 Feb 2024	Kisaragi Sho	GIII	1800m (Good)	Kyoto	1	12	Rene Piechulek	(Water Licht)
14 Apr 2024	Satsuki Sho	GI	2000m (Good)	Nakayama	13	17	Bauyrzhan Murzabayev	Justin Milano
26 May 2024	Tokyo Yushun	GI	2400m (Good)	Tokyo	17	17	Atsuya Nishimura	Danon Decile
22 Sep 2024	Kobe Shimbun Hai	GII	2200m (Good to Soft)	Chukyo	6	14	Hideaki Miyuki	Meisho Tabaru
20 Oct 2024	Kikuka Sho	GI	3000m (Good)	Kyoto	5	18	Andrasch Starke	Urban Chic
26 Jan 2025	American Jockey Club Cup	GII	2200m (Good)	Nakayama	6	18	Aurélien Lemaitre	Danon Decile
22 Feb 2025	Red Sea Turf Handicap	GII	3000m (Good)	King Abdulaziz	1	11	Oisin Murphy	(Epic Poet)
4 May 2025	Tenno Sho (Spring)	GI	3200m (Good)	Kyoto	2	15	Andrasch Starke	Redentor
7 Sep 2025	Prix Foy	GII	2400m (Good to Soft)	Longchamp	1	11	Oisin Murphy	(Sosie)
5 Oct 2025	Prix de l'Arc de Triomphe	GI	2400m (Soft)	Longchamp	5	17	Oisin Murphy	Daryz
14 Feb 2026	The Amir Trophy	GII	2400m (Good)	Al-Rayyan	7	7	Cristian Demuro	Deep Monster
14 Jun 2026	Takarazuka Kinen	GI	2200m (Soft)	Hanshin	15	18	Atsuya Nishimura	Meisho Tabaru
8 Nov 2026	Copa Republica Argentina	GII	2500m (Good)	Tokyo	13	18	Kokubun Yusaku	Family Time

== Pedigree ==
Pedigree of Byzantine Dream (JPN), chestnut stallion, 2021
Sire Epiphaneia (JPN) 2010	Symboli Kris S (JPN); 1999	Kris S	Roberto
Sire Epiphaneia (JPN) 2010	Symboli Kris S (JPN); 1999	Kris S	Sharp Queen
Sire Epiphaneia (JPN) 2010	Symboli Kris S (JPN); 1999	Tee Kay	Gold Meridian
Sire Epiphaneia (JPN) 2010	Symboli Kris S (JPN); 1999	Tee Kay	Tri Argo
Sire Epiphaneia (JPN) 2010	Cesario (JPN); 2002	Special Week	Sunday Silence
Sire Epiphaneia (JPN) 2010	Cesario (JPN); 2002	Special Week	Campaign Girl
Sire Epiphaneia (JPN) 2010	Cesario (JPN); 2002	Kirov Premiere	Sadler's Wells
Sire Epiphaneia (JPN) 2010	Cesario (JPN); 2002	Kirov Premiere	Querida
Dam Japoni Chara (JPN) 2012	Jungle Pocket (JPN); 1998	Tony Bin	Kampala
Dam Japoni Chara (JPN) 2012	Jungle Pocket (JPN); 1998	Tony Bin	Severn Bridge
Dam Japoni Chara (JPN) 2012	Jungle Pocket (JPN); 1998	Dance Charmer	Nureyev
Dam Japoni Chara (JPN) 2012	Jungle Pocket (JPN); 1998	Dance Charmer	Skillful Joy
Dam Japoni Chara (JPN) 2012	Glitter Chara (JPN); 2005	French Deputy	Deputy Minister
Dam Japoni Chara (JPN) 2012	Glitter Chara (JPN); 2005	French Deputy	Mitterand
Dam Japoni Chara (JPN) 2012	Glitter Chara (JPN); 2005	Fusaichi Airedale	Sunday Silence
Dam Japoni Chara (JPN) 2012	Glitter Chara (JPN); 2005	Fusaichi Airedale	Rustic Belle (Family: 20-a)

- Byzantine Dream is inbred to Sunday Silence 4 x 4, meaning that he appears twice in the fourth generation of Byzantine Dream's pedigree.
- Byzantine Dream is also inbred to Northern Dancer 5 x 5, meaning he appears twice in the fifth generation of Byzantine Dream's pedigree.
