= Mawj =

Irish Thoroughbred racehorse

- Sire: Exceed And Excel
- Grandsire: Danehill
- Dam: Modern Ideals
- Damsire: New Approach
- Sex: Filly
- Foaled: 24 April 2020
- Country: Ireland
- Colour: Bay
- Breeder: Godolphin
- Owner: Godolphin
- Trainer: Saeed bin Suroor
- Record: 11: 6-2-1
- Earnings: US$1,296,585

Major wins
- Duchess of Cambridge Stakes (2022); 1000 Guineas (2023); Queen Elizabeth II Challenge Cup Stakes (2023)
- Last updated on 5 November 2023

Mawj (foaled 24 April 2020) is a retired Irish-bred Thoroughbred racehorse. She showed very good form as a juvenile in 2022 when she won the Duchess of Cambridge Stakes and was placed in both the Albany Stakes and the Cheveley Park Stakes. In the following year she won two races in the United Arab Emirates before taking the 1000 Guineas.

== Background ==
Mawj is a small bay filly with a white star and a white coronet on her left forefoot bred in Ireland by her owner, Sheikh Mohammed's Godolphin organisation. Her name is Arabic for "wave". She was sent into training with Saeed bin Suroor who is based in Newmarket in summer but moves to Godolphin's base in Dubai in winter.

She was sired by the Australian horse Exceed and Excel who won the Newmarket Handicap before being exported to become a breeding stallion in Europe. The best of his progeny have included Excelebration, Outstrip, Margot Did and Bivouac. Mawj's dam Modern Ideals showed no racing ability but had previously produced Modern Games and was a half-sister to the Prix Jean-Luc Lagardère winner Ultra. She was a great-granddaughter of Konafa who finished second in the 1000 Guineas and was the female-line ancestor of Bosra Sham, Hector Protector and Golden Sixty.

== Racing career ==
=== 2022: two-year-old season ===
In 2022 Mawj was campaigned exclusively over six furlongs and was ridden in all of her races by Ray Dawson. The filly made her debut in a novice race (for horses with no more than two previous wins) on good to firm ground at Newmarket Racecourse on 14 May and started the 12/1 sixth choice in a twelve-runner field. After being restrained by Dawson in the early stages she moved up to take the lead a furlong from the finish and drew away from her rivals to win by four and a half lengths in "impressive" style. Mawj was immediately stepped up in class and started favourite for the Group 3 Albany Stakes at Royal Ascot in which she finished second of the sixteen runners behind the Aidan O'Brien-trained Meditate a filly who went on to win the Breeders' Cup Juvenile Fillies Turf.

The filly was then moved up to Group 2 class for the Duchess of Cambridge Stakes at Newmarket on 8 July and started the 4/1 third favourite in a field of six fillies. She led from the start and despite hanging to the left in the closing stages she "kept on well" to prevail be half a length from the favourite Lezoo. The racecourse stewards held an inquiry into possible interference but the result remained unaltered. Saeed bin Suroor commented "She's a tiny filly, but she's always had class. When she won at Newmarket first time she did so after just one piece of work in her life... We'll keep options open, but all trainers think when they have a small filly they need to make the most of it. She may grow, I hope she does and sometimes fillies change as three-year-olds, but the Cheveley Park will be a nice race for her and then we'll take her to Dubai."

In August Mawj contested the Group 2 Lowther Stakes at York Racecourse and came home fourth of the thirteen runners behind Swingalong. Queen Me and Matilda Picotte. For her final run of the season the filly was stepped up to Group 1 level for the Cheveley Park Stakes at Newmarket on 24 September. Starting at odds of 10/1 she stayed on well in the closing stages to take third place behind Lezoo and Meditate, beaten one and a half lengths behind the winner.

In the official two-year-old ratings for 2022, Mawj was rated the equal ninth-best juvenile filly of the season in Europe, eight pounds behind the Moyglare Stud Stakes winner Tahiyra.

=== 2023: three-year-old season ===
For the winter on 2022/3 Mawj was sent to Godolphin's training base in Dubai. She made her seasonal debut in the Jumeirah Fillies Classic over 1400 metres at Meydan Racecourse on 27 January when she was ridden by Pat Cosgrave and started second favourite behind another Godolphin runner Dream of Love. After tracking the leaders, Mawj went to the front 200 metres from the finish and held off a late challenge from Dream of Love to win by a short head. Four weeks later, ridden by Danny Tudhope, Mawj started joint favourite for the Jumeirah Fillies Guineas over 1600 metres at the same track. She took the lead soon after the start and drew away from her opponents in the straight to win in "impressive" style by eight and a half lengths from the Prestige Stakes winner Fairy Cross. After the race Saeed bin Suroor commented "Mawj has plenty of speed, as she showed over six furlongs... Now we will look at the English Guineas or the French Guineas – it will depend on what the boss decides... As a two-year-old, Mawj was tiny and skinny. You would not think she is a lot but every time she worked in the morning she showed some class... She grew a little when she arrived in Dubai and the warm weather helped her. She looks a nice filly for the future".

On her return to Europe, Mawj contested the 210th edition of the 1000 Guineas over the Rowley Mile at Newmarket on 7 May Cachet, when she was partnered by Oisin Murphy and started the 9/1 fifth choice in the betting behind Tahiyra, Meditate, Dream of Love and Remarquee (Fred Darling Stakes). The other fifteen runners included Lezoo, Fairy Cross, Matilda Picotte, Queen Me and Mammas Girl (Nell Gwyn Stakes). Racing down the centre of the wide Newmarket straight, Mawj started well and was among the leaders from the start. In the last furlong the race devolved into a two horse race between Mawj and Tahiyra, and Mawj got the better of a sustained struggle to win by half a length with the pair finishing more than seven lengths clear of the rest. After the race, Murphy, who had recently returned from a 14-month ban from riding commented "It is lovely to see a Classic like that when they go clear and show their class. I was watching Mawj's replays again this morning and was thinking did she really win by eight and a half lengths last time in Meydan, and why did she win so easily? She is clearly just exceptional".

=== 2024: four-year-old season ===
Mawj was retired after one start in 2024 at Meydan Racecourse where she finished ninth in the Group 1 Jebel Hatta.

== Statistics ==
Date	Distance	Race	Group Grade	Track	Odds	Field	Finish	Time	Winning (Losing) Margin	Jockey	Ref
2022 – two-year-old season
14 May 2022	6 furlongs	Novice Stakes		Newmarket	12/1	10	1	1:13.47	4 3/4 lengths	Ray Dawson	
17 Jun 2022	6 furlongs	Albany Stakes	III	Royal Ascot	2/1*	16	2	1:14:38	(1 3/4 lengths)	Ray Dawson	
8 Jul 2022	6 furlongs	Duchess of Cambridge Stakes	II	Newmarket	4/1	6	1	1:11.02	1/2 length	Ray Dawson	
18 Aug 2022	6 furlongs	Lowther Stakes	II	York	5/1	13	4	1:10.80	(3 lengths)	Ray Dawson	
24 Sep 2022	6 furlongs	Cheveley Park Stakes	I	Newmarket	10/1	10	3	1:11.84	(1 1/2 length)	Ray Dawson	
2023 – three-year-old season
27 Jan 2023	1400 metres (Note: Distance for the event was approximately 7 furlongs)	Jumeirah Fillies Classic		Meydan (UAE)	N/A (Note: Mawj final odds with British bookmakers were 9/4 since gambling is prohibited in the United Arab Emirates)	12	1	1:26.21	short head	Pat Cosgrave	
24 Feb 2023	1600 metres (Note: Distance for the event was approximately 1 mile)	Jumeirah Fillies Guineas		Meydan (UAE)	N/A (Note: Mawj final odds with British bookmakers were 11/10 equal favourite with Fairy Cross since gambling is prohibited in the United Arab Emirates)	9	1	1:36.92	8 1/2 lengths	Daniel Tudhope	
7 May 2023	1 mile	1000 Guineas	I	Newmarket	9/1	20	1	1:37.92	1/2 length	Oisin Murphy	
14 Oct 2023	1 1/8 miles	Queen Elizabeth II Challenge Cup	I	Keeneland	1.31*	9	1	1:48.06	1/2 length	Oisin Murphy	
4 Nov 2023	1 mile	Breeders' Cup Mile	I	Santa Anita	4.90	13	2	1:32.45	(nose)	Oisin Murphy	
2024 –four-year-old season
26 Jan 2024	1800 metres	Jebel Hatta	I	Meydan (UAE)	N/A (Note: Mawj final odds with British bookmakers were 2/1 since gambling is prohibited in the United Arab Emirates)	9	9	1:48:19	(14 lengths)	Oisin Murphy	

Notes:
An (*) asterisk after the odds means Mawj was the post-time favourite.

== Pedigree ==
Pedigree of Mawj (IRE), bay filly, 2020
Sire Exceed And Excel (AUS) 2000	Danehill; 1986	Danzig	Northern Dancer
Sire Exceed And Excel (AUS) 2000	Danehill; 1986	Danzig	Pas de Nom
Sire Exceed And Excel (AUS) 2000	Danehill; 1986	Razyana	His Majesty
Sire Exceed And Excel (AUS) 2000	Danehill; 1986	Razyana	Spring Adieu
Sire Exceed And Excel (AUS) 2000	Patrona (USA); 1994	Lomond	Northern Dancer
Sire Exceed And Excel (AUS) 2000	Patrona (USA); 1994	Lomond	My Charmer
Sire Exceed And Excel (AUS) 2000	Patrona (USA); 1994	Gladiolus	Watch Your Step
Sire Exceed And Excel (AUS) 2000	Patrona (USA); 1994	Gladiolus	Back Britches
Dam Modern Ideals (GB) 2010	New Approach (IRE); 2005	Galileo	Sadler's Wells (USA)
Dam Modern Ideals (GB) 2010	New Approach (IRE); 2005	Galileo	Urban Sea (USA)
Dam Modern Ideals (GB) 2010	New Approach (IRE); 2005	Park Express	Ahonoora (GB)
Dam Modern Ideals (GB) 2010	New Approach (IRE); 2005	Park Express	Matcher (CAN)
Dam Modern Ideals (GB) 2010	Epitome (IRE); 1999	Nashwan (USA)	Blushing Groom (FR)
Dam Modern Ideals (GB) 2010	Epitome (IRE); 1999	Nashwan (USA)	Height of Fashion (FR)
Dam Modern Ideals (GB) 2010	Epitome (IRE); 1999	Proskona (USA)	Mr Prospector
Dam Modern Ideals (GB) 2010	Epitome (IRE); 1999	Proskona (USA)	Konafa (CAN) (Family: 22-b)
