= Scurry Stakes =

Flat horse race in Britain

Scurry Stakes
2026
Words Of Truth	Lady Youmzain	Poatan

Previous years
2025
Town And Country	Hold A Dream	Star Of Mehmas
2024
Adaay In Devon	Flora Of Bermuda	Nighteyes
2023
Lady Hamana	Tajalla	Great State
2022
Mitbaahy	Live In The Dream	Caturra
2021
Atalis Bay	Warrior Brave	Steel Bull

2020-2011
2020
Lazuli	Keep Busy	Dream Shot
2019
Kurious	The Cruising Lord	Reticent Angel
2018
Haddaf	Tricksy Spirit	Wings Of The Rock
2017
Battaash	Koropick	Copper Knight
2016
Easton Angel	Willytheconqueror	Ornate
2015
Waady	Profitable	Elysian Flyer
2014
Wind Fire	Hay Chewed	G Force
2013
Morawij	March	Sandreamer
2012
Pearl Secret	Free Zone	Ultrasonic
2011
Margot Did	Dinkum Diamond	Move In Time

2010-2005
2010
Burning Thread	Reignier	Above Limits
2009
Triple Aspect	Jargelle	Rain Delayed
2008
Corrybrough	Inxile	Philario
2007
Hoh Mike	City of Tribes	Contest
2006
Angus Newz	Dixie Belle	Gamble In Gold
2005
Resplendent Glory	Bigalos Bandit	Jewel In The Sand

The Scurry Stakes is a Listed flat horse race in Great Britain open to horses aged three years. It is run at Sandown Park over a distance of 5 furlongs and 10 yards (1,015 metres), and it is scheduled to take place each year in June.

The race was first run in 2005.

== Records ==
Leading jockey (2 wins):

- William Buick - Burning Thread (2010), Lazuli (2020)
- Ryan Moore - Corrybrough (2008), Morawij (2013)
- Dane O'Neill - Waady (2015), Battaash (2017)
- Jamie Spencer – Hoh Mike (2007), Wind Fire (2014)

Leading trainer (2 wins):

- Michael Bell - Hoh Mike (2007), Margot Did (2011)
- Henry Candy – Corrybrough (2008), Kurious (2019)
- Roger Varian - Morawij (2013), Mitbaahy (2022)
- Charlie Appleby - Lazuli (2020), Words Of Truth (2026)

== Winners ==
Year	Winner	Jockey	Trainer	Time
2005	Resplendent Glory	Shane Kelly	Terry Mills	1:00.95
2006	Angus Newz	Darryll Holland	Micky Quinn	1:00.76
2007	Hoh Mike	Jamie Spencer	Michael Bell	1:03.19
2008	Corrybrough	Ryan Moore	Henry Candy	1:00.48
2009	Triple Aspect	Liam Jones	William Haggas	1:00.77
2010	Burning Thread	William Buick	Tim Etherington	1:00.48
2011	Margot Did	Hayley Turner	Michael Bell	1:01.84
2012	Pearl Secret	Richard Hughes	David Barron	1:05.31
2013	Morawij	Ryan Moore	Roger Varian	1:01.54
2014	Wind Fire	Jamie Spencer	David Brown	1:00.03
2015	Waady	Dane O'Neill	John Gosden	1:00.98
2016	Easton Angel	Paul Mulrennan	Michael Dods	1:00.32
2017	Battaash	Dane O'Neill	Charles Hills	0:59.32
2018	Haddaf	James Doyle	James Tate	1:01.40
2019	Kurious	Kieran Shoemark	Henry Candy	1:02.76
2020	Lazuli	William Buick	Charlie Appleby	1:00.30
2021	Atalis Bay	Andrea Atzeni	Marco Botti	1:00.68
2022	Mitbaahy	David Egan	Roger Varian	1:01.22
2023	Lady Hamana	Clifford Lee	Karl Burke	1:00.66
2024	Adaay In Devon	Silvestre de Sousa	Rod Millman	1:01.83
2025	Town And Country	Colin Keane	Henry de Bromhead	1:01.73
2026	Words Of Truth	Oisin Murphy	Charlie Appleby	1:02.06

== See also ==
- Horse racing in Great Britain
- List of British flat horse races
