= Margot Did =

Irish-bred Thoroughbred racehorse

- Racing silks of Peter Phillip & Tim Redman
- Sire: Exceed And Excel
- Grandsire: Danehill
- Dam: Special Dancer
- Damsire: Shareef Dancer
- Sex: Mare
- Foaled: 17 March 2008
- Country: Ireland
- Colour: Bay
- Breeder: Nicky Hartery
- Owner: Peter Phillip & Tim Redman
- Trainer: Michael Bell
- Record: 19: 5-3-2
- Earnings: £263,183

Major wins
- Scurry Stakes (2011); Land O'Burns Fillies' Stakes (2011); Nunthorpe Stakes (2011)

Margot Did (foaled 17 March 2008) is an Irish-bred, British-trained Thoroughbred racehorse and broodmare. After being sold cheaply as a yearling and again as a two-year-old she entered training with Michael Bell at Newmarket. As a juvenile in 2010 she showed high-class form, winning twice and finished second in the Albany Stakes, Princess Margaret Stakes and Lowther Stakes. In 2012 she was beaten in her first two races but established herself as a potentially high-class sprinter with wins in the Scurry Stakes and the Land O'Burns Fillies' Stakes. At York Racecourse in August she recorded her biggest win with a 20/1 upset victory in the Nunthorpe Stakes. She never reproduced her best form thereafter and finished unplaced in her five remaining races. She was retired from racing in August 2012.

== Background ==
Margot Did is a bay mare with no white markings bred in Ireland by Nicky Hartery. She was sired by the Australian horse Exceed and Excel who won the Newmarket Handicap before being exported to become a breeding stallion in Europe. The best of his progeny have included Excelebration, Outstrip and the Al Quoz Sprint winner Amber Sky. Margot Did's dam Special Dancer raced without success in Italy before being retired to the breeding paddocks. She was a distant descendant of the Poule d'Essai des Poulains winner Apollonia.

As a yearling, Margot Did was consigned from the Caherass Stud to the Goffs Open Sale in October 2009 and was bought for €16,000 by Michael Halford. In the following April, the filly was offered for auction at Tattersalls Guineas Breeze-Up, a sale in which two-year-olds are required to perform in a trial gallop before being sold. She was sold for 10,000 guineas to the bloodstock agent Richard Frisby on behalf of the trainer Michael Bell. Bell later said that he would have been willing to pay more and that the low price might have due to her being among the first lots in the sale and her moderate performance in the "breeze-up" gallop. The filly entered the ownership of Peter Phillip and Tim Redman and was sent into training with Bell at his Fitzroy House yard Newmarket, Suffolk. She was ridden in all but one of her races by Hayley Turner.

== Racing career ==
=== 2010: two-year-old season ===
Margot Did began her racing career with two length win in a six furlong maiden race on 22 May and followed up with a win in a minor race at Yarmouth Racecourse twelve days later. The filly was then moved up in class for the Group Three Albany Stakes at Royal Ascot on 18 June. Starting at odds of 7/1 in a 22-runner field she took the lead approaching the final furlong but was caught in the final strides and beaten a head by the Richard Hannon, Sr-trained Memory. In July, she started 2/1 favourite for the Princess Margaret Stakes over the same course and distance. As in the Albany, she took the lead a furlong out before being headed in the closing stages, this time being beaten half a length by Soraaya. In August, Margot Did started second favourite behind the Queen Mary Stakes winner Maqaasid in the Lowther Stakes at York Racecourse. She was restrained by Turner in the early stages she struggled to obtain a clear run in the last quarter mile before finishing strongly to take second place, three-quarters of a lengths behind Hooray. The filly was then dropped in class for the Listed Dick Poole Fillies' Stakes at Salisbury Racecourse on 2 September. She started 11/10 favourite, but in a three-way photo-finish she was beaten a nose and a neck by Brevity and Rimth. On her final appearance, Margot Did was stepped up to Group One Class for the Cheveley Park Stakes at Newmarket Racecourse and finished fifth of the eleven runners behind Hooray, Rimth, Maqaasid and Ragsah.

=== 2011: three-year-old season ===
Margot Did began her three-year-old debut in the Listed Pavilion Stakes at Ascot on 27 April, starting favourite but finishing third behind Perfect Tribute and Aneedah. Having raced over six furlongs in all of her starts up to that point, the filly was dropped in distance for a minor stakes race at York on 12 May. She finished fourth to Night Carnation but looked most unlucky as her saddle slipped during the race after she was hampered in the early stages. On 11 June the filly started second favourite behind Night Carnation in the Listed Scurry Stakes over the same distance at Sandown Park Racecourse. Turner tracked the leader Button Moon before going to the front two furlongs from the finish. She accelerated away from her rivals in the closing stages and won by five lengths from the colt Dinkum Diamond, with Night Carnation in fourth. After the filly's win Bell said "Margot Did finally did! She fully deserved that, as she is proving to be the unluckiest filly in training. Long-term now we have got to think about the Nunthorpe as we know she runs well at York."

A week after her win at Sandown, the filly was sent to Scotland for the Land O'Burns Fillies' Stakes at Ayr Racecourse and started the odds-on favourite against six opponents. In order to partner the filly, Turner gave up the chance to ride Deacon Blues at Royal Ascot, missing out on a win in the Wokingham Stakes. She raced alongside the leader Favourite Girl before taking the lead a furlong out and held off the challenge of the Irish four-year-old Celerina to win by a neck. Margot Did met Night Carnation again in the Coral Charge at Sandown on 2 July and finished fourth behind her rival after fading in the closing stages.

On 19 August Margot Did started a 20/1 outsider for the Group One Nunthorpe Stakes over five furlongs at York. The Stewards' Cup winner Hoof It started favourite ahead of Bated Breath (runner-up in the July Cup) and the Irish two-year-old Requinto (Molecomb Stakes) whilst the other runners included Masamah (King George Stakes), Prohibit (King's Stand Stakes), Wizz Kid (Prix du Gros Chêne), Inxile (Prix de Saint Georges), Kingsgate Native (winner of the race in 2007) and Swiss Diva (Prix du Petit Couvert). The field split into two groups with Margot Did tracking the leader Hamish McGonagall on the stands side (the right side of the course from the jockeys' viewpoint) whilst Masamah headed the group on the far side. Turner sent the filly into the lead a furlong out and Margot Did ran on well in the closing stages to win by three-quarters of a length from Hamish McGonagall with Prohibit taking third ahead of Kingsgate Native, Wizz Kid and Hoof It. It was a second Group One win for Turner after riding Dream Ahead to success in the July Cup. The only other female jockey to have won at the highest level in Britain was Alex Greaves who partnered Ya Malak to a dead heat in the 1997 Nunthorpe. After the race Turner said "I need to thank the owners for persisting with me... It just goes to show, if you work hard and are dedicated, it can be done. This filly has always been special to me, but I've only really just figured how to get the best out of her. She loves plenty of daylight. She has one gear for the end and you have to save it for as long as you can". Bell commented This has been the plan since she won at Sandown and she is a really tough filly... we found the key to riding her at Sandown when we found that she is happy bowling along and today from a long way out she was one of the few on the bridle. I thought it was going to be tough for a three-year-old filly but she delivered".

Turner sustained a broken ankle in a fall at Bath Racecourse on 31 August and Jamie Spencer took over when Margot Did ended her season in the Prix de l'Abbaye over 1000 metres at Longchamp Racecourse on 2 October. She was among the early leaders before weakening in the last 400 metres and finished last of the fifteen runners behind Tangerine Trees.

=== 2012: four-year-old season ===
Margot Did remained in training as a four-year-old but failed to reproduce anything like her best form. She began her season in Dubai where she finished eighth in the Meydan Sprint and tenth behind Ortensia in the Al Quoz Sprint. On her return to Europe her form deteriorated as she finished last of sixteen to Mayson in the Palace House Stakes, twenty-first behind Little Bridge in the King's Stand Stakes and tenth of eleven when dropped to Group Three class for the Summer Stakes at York.

Shortly afterwards she was sold to an associate of the Coolmore Stud and did not race again. Bell paid tribute to the filly saying "she's given us two wonderful years and a lot of fun. She was unlucky not to win a stakes race at two but we changed tactics with her last year, and that turned her from a bridesmaid into a bride. She was a real pocket rocket and it's great that she's going to such a good place".

== Breeding record ==
Margot Did made a promising start as a broodmare with her first two foals to reach the track both winning Group races:

- Mission Impassible, a chestnut filly, foaled in 2015, sired by Galileo. Won four races including Prix de Sandringham.
- Magic Attitude, bay filly, 2017, by Galileo. Won two races including Prix Vanteaux.
- Pietrasanta, bay colt, 2018, by Frankel. Won two races.
- Inzaghi, bay colt, 2019, by Heart's Cry. Failed to win in two races.
- Justin Milano, bay colt, 2021, by Kizuna. Won 3 races including Kyodo Tsushin Hai and Satsuki Sho.
- Jong God, bay colt, 2024, by Kitasan Black. Yet to race.

== Pedigree ==
Pedigree of Margot Did, bay filly, 2008
Sire Exceed and Excel (AUS) 2000	Danehill (USA); 1986	Danzig	Northern Dancer
Sire Exceed and Excel (AUS) 2000	Danehill (USA); 1986	Danzig	Pas de Nom
Sire Exceed and Excel (AUS) 2000	Danehill (USA); 1986	Razyana	His Majesty
Sire Exceed and Excel (AUS) 2000	Danehill (USA); 1986	Razyana	Spring Adieu
Sire Exceed and Excel (AUS) 2000	Patrona (USA); 1994	Lomond	Northern Dancer
Sire Exceed and Excel (AUS) 2000	Patrona (USA); 1994	Lomond	My Charmer
Sire Exceed and Excel (AUS) 2000	Patrona (USA); 1994	Gladiolus	Watch Your Step
Sire Exceed and Excel (AUS) 2000	Patrona (USA); 1994	Gladiolus	Back Britches
Dam Special Dancer (GB) 1997	Shareef Dancer (USA); 1980	Northern Dancer	Nearctic
Dam Special Dancer (GB) 1997	Shareef Dancer (USA); 1980	Northern Dancer	Natalma
Dam Special Dancer (GB) 1997	Shareef Dancer (USA); 1980	Sweet Alliance	Sir Ivor
Dam Special Dancer (GB) 1997	Shareef Dancer (USA); 1980	Sweet Alliance	Mrs Peterkin
Dam Special Dancer (GB) 1997	Caraniya (IRE); 1986	Darshaan	Shirley Heights
Dam Special Dancer (GB) 1997	Caraniya (IRE); 1986	Darshaan	Delsy
Dam Special Dancer (GB) 1997	Caraniya (IRE); 1986	Callianire	Sir Gaylord
Dam Special Dancer (GB) 1997	Caraniya (IRE); 1986	Callianire	Passionata (Family: 13-c)

- Margot Did was inbred 3 × 4 × 4 to Northern Dancer, meaning that this stallion appears once in the third and twice in the fourth generation of her pedigree.
