= Redentor (horse) =

Japanese-bred Thoroughbred racehorse

Redentor; ヘデントール
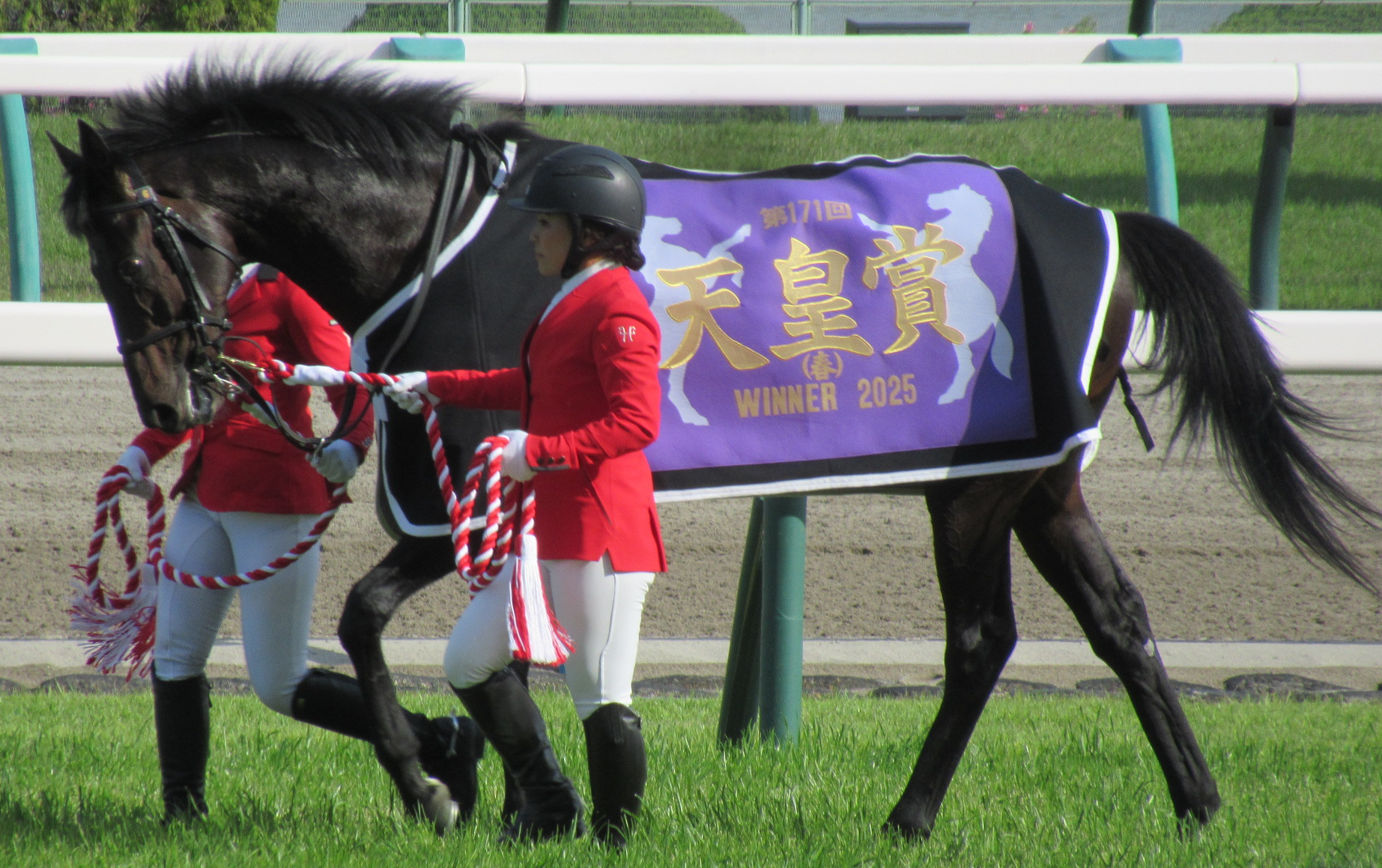
- Redentor after winning 2025 Tenno Sho (Spring)
- Sire: Rulership
- Grandsire: King Kamehameha
- Dam: Corcovado
- Damsire: Stay Gold
- Sex: Stallion
- Foaled: 6 April 2021
- Country: Japan
- Colour: Dark Bay
- Breeder: Northern Farm
- Owner: U Carrot Farm Ltd.
- Racing colours
- Trainer: Tetsuya Kimura
- Jockey: Christophe Lemaire
- Record: 12: 6-2-0
- Earnings: ¥522,801,000

Major wins
- Diamond Stakes (2025); Tennō Shō (Spring) (2025)

Redentor (Japanese: ヘデントール, Hepburn: Hedentōru; foaled 6 April 2021) is an active Japanese Thoroughbred racehorse. He is best known for his capabilities in long-distance races, having both won the Diamond Stakes and Tenno Sho (Spring) in 2025 (Both races are 3000 metres and above). Redentor was also runner-up to Urban Chic in the 2024 Kikuka Sho.

== Background ==
Redentor was foaled out of Corcovado, a mare who won five races and placed in another seven out of 16 races in her career. Her sire was Stay Gold, who won the 2001 Dubai Sheema Classic and Hong Kong Vase. His sire was Rulership, who was 2012 Queen Elizabeth II Cup winner. Rulership was sired by King Kamehameha, the leading sire in Japan in 2010 and 2011.

Redentor's name is derived from the Portuguese word for redeemer, referring to the Christ the Redeemer statue in Corcovado.

== Racing career ==
=== Two-year-old season (2023) ===
Redentor made his debut with Christophe Lemaire as his jockey in a 2000 metre turf race at Tokyo Racecourse. In this race, he stayed calm at the back until the fourth corner where he sprinted, but was ultimately beaten by future Satsuki Sho winner, Justin Milano to the line.

=== Three-year-old season (2024) ===
In his second race, Redentor raced in a 2000 metre turf race at Nakayama Racecourse. Utilizing a similar strategy as before, he settled calmly in the back and broke away at the final stretch to secure his first career victory. He repeated this success again in his next race with a victory of three lengths ahead of his competitors. He then entered in his first graded race, the Aoba Sho, jockeyed by UAE champion jockey, Tadhg O'Shea. They aimed for a gate-to-wire finish but ran out of steam in the final straight and finished eighth. Redentor was with Lemaire for the next two races, winning both the Machida Tokubetsu and Nihonkai Stakes convincingly. These two wins qualified Redentor for open class and earned him a spot in the Kikuka Sho. In that race, Redentor was paired with Keita Tosaki, starting slowly and chasing early on, but gradually made steady progress as the race went on and ended up second, two and a half lengths behind Urban Chic. Meanwhile, Keita Tosaki stated that his preparations and conditions were excellent, and he regretted that he could not get the victory.

=== Four-year-old season (2025) ===
Redentor made his season debut on February 22 in the Diamond Stakes, a 3400 metre turf race held in Tokyo Racecourse. He maintained a good position throughout before fully accelerating on the third bend to pull away from his competitors for his fifth career win. This win established him as a heavy contender for the Tenno Sho (Spring) that year. Partnered with Damian Lane, who was riding on a short-term license from JRA, they settled mostly between sixth and seventh place. Lane kept Redentor inside on the fence until the final 1000 metres where he shifted to the outside and improved his position to join the front group. In the final stretch, he battled against Byzantine Dream, jockeyed by Andrasch Starke. Redentor took the lead over Byzantine Dream at the 200 metre mark and held on to secure his first Grade 1 career victory. Following this win, Redentor gained entries for several international races, including the Prix de l'Arc de Triomphe and Juddmonte International. However, he had to pull out from both due to several factors such as bone fractures and lameness. These injuries sidelined Redentor for the rest of the season. Despite his injuries, Redentor's name was registered for the Arima Kinen, securing him a spot as the tenth highest voted horse, and earning an automatic qualification into the race. This event caused an uproar among the community as Redentor's qualification blocked out several horses from competing, notably Lilac, who was sat in eleventh in the vote and had to qualify via prize money, where she sat far below several other horses.

=== Five-year-old season (2026) ===
After a long layoff since last May, Redentor was prepared for his season opener at the Kyoto Kinen. In the race, Redentor stayed mostly at the back and managed to mark the lead pack, but he was not sharp as expected and he failed to accelerate well in the final straight. He finished in eighth place, his first time he finished outside the podium since the 2024 Aoba Sho. Lemaire, who returned as his jockey, noted that Redentor ran a good race, but the pack made him unstable on the third and fourth corner, although he was gaining momentum towards the end. In May, he would try to defend his crown in the Tenno Sho (Spring) at Kyoto. From gate 12, Redentor mostly stayed in ninth place. He showed effort by moving up the field in the final spurt, but he was no match for the leading pack and ended up in fifth place on the day. Lemaire commented that he ran calmly in the middle phase but lost some momentum towards the end, whilst his trainer Kimura praised his effort for running as hard as he could. He rested up in the whole summer and would continue his campaign at the Kyoto Daishoten in October. In this race, he was drawn into Gate 4 and would be jockeyed by Hayato Yoshida. Redentor was on point in the warm-ups and also nailed the start when the race began, but he was blocked in the early phase. He did recover as the race went on and competed for the lead at the final straight but lacked the needed acceleration. He finished in fifth place on the day. Yoshida was aware on his injury history and also noted that his mediocre first step was the reason his path was narrow early on. On the contrary, he praised that the horse composed himself and ran better in the later phase despite the non-ideal track condition.

== Racing form ==
Redentor has won six out of twelve of his career starts. The below data compiled is based on JBIS and netkeiba.

Date	Track	Race	Grade	Distance (Condition)	Entry	HN	Odds (Favored)	Finish	Time	Margin	Jockey	Winner (Runner-up)
2023 – two-year-old season
Nov 18	Tokyo	2YO Debut		2,000m (Firm)	14	6	4.4 (3)	2nd	2:02.3	0.3	Christophe Lemaire	Justin Milano
2024 – three-year-old season
Jan 13	Nakayama	3YO Maiden		2,000m (Firm)	17	9	1.9 (1)	1st	2:00.2	–0.4	Christophe Lemaire	(Shonan Natsuzora)
Mar 9	Nakayama	3YO Allowance	1W	2,000m (Soft)	11	3	1.4 (1)	1st	2:01.9	–0.5	Christophe Lemaire	(Yamanin Ad Hoc)
Apr 27	Tokyo	Aoba Sho	2	2,400m (Firm)	17	9	3.5 (1)	8th	2:24.8	0.6	Tadhg O'Shea	Sugar Kun
Jun 16	Tokyo	Machida Tokubetsu	2W	2,400m (Firm)	7	5	1.3 (1)	1st	2:26.9	–0.3	Christophe Lemaire	(Taisei Feerique)
Aug 17	Niigata	Nihonkai Stakes	3W	2,200m (Firm)	9	9	1.6 (1)	1st	2:12.4	–0.6	Christophe Lemaire	(Night in London)
Oct 20	Kyoto	Kikuka Sho	1	3,000m (Firm)	18	16	7.1 (4)	2nd	3:04.5	0.4	Keita Tosaki	Urban Chic
2025 – four-year-old season
Feb 22	Tokyo	Diamond Stakes	3	3,400m (Firm)	16	8	1.9 (1)	1st	3:32.2	–0.7	Keita Tosaki	(Jean Kazuma)
May 4	Kyoto	Tennō Shō (Spring)	1	3,200m (Firm)	15	6	3.1 (1)	1st	3:14.2	0.0	Damian Lane	(Byzantine Dream)
2026 – five-year-old season
Feb 15	Kyoto	Kyoto Kinen	2	2,200m (Firm)	12	1	3.8 (1)	8th	2:13.6	0.9	Christophe Lemaire	June Take
May 3	Kyoto	Tennō Shō (Spring)	1	3,200m (Firm)	15	12	5.0 (3)	5th	3:14.1	0.4	Christophe Lemaire	Croix du Nord
Oct 4	Kyoto	Kyoto Daishoten	2	2,400m (Good)	18	4	8.8 (5)	5th	2:24.3	0.3	Hayato Yoshida	Ecoro Dinos

Legend:
Turf

== Pedigree ==
Pedigree of Redentor (JPN), dark bay stallion, 2021
Sire Rulership (JPN) 2007	King Kamehameha (JPN); 2001	Kingmambo	Mr. Prospector
Sire Rulership (JPN) 2007	King Kamehameha (JPN); 2001	Kingmambo	Miesque
Sire Rulership (JPN) 2007	King Kamehameha (JPN); 2001	Manfath	Last Tycoon
Sire Rulership (JPN) 2007	King Kamehameha (JPN); 2001	Manfath	Pilot Bird
Sire Rulership (JPN) 2007	Air Groove (JPN); 1993	Tony Bin	Kampala
Sire Rulership (JPN) 2007	Air Groove (JPN); 1993	Tony Bin	Severn Bridge
Sire Rulership (JPN) 2007	Air Groove (JPN); 1993	Dyna Carle	Northern Taste
Sire Rulership (JPN) 2007	Air Groove (JPN); 1993	Dyna Carle	Shadai Feather
Dam Corcovado (JPN) 2013 FNo: 17-b	Stay Gold (JPN); 1994	Sunday Silence	Halo
Dam Corcovado (JPN) 2013 FNo: 17-b	Stay Gold (JPN); 1994	Sunday Silence	Wishing Well
Dam Corcovado (JPN) 2013 FNo: 17-b	Stay Gold (JPN); 1994	Golden Sash	Dictus
Dam Corcovado (JPN) 2013 FNo: 17-b	Stay Gold (JPN); 1994	Golden Sash	Dyna Sash
Dam Corcovado (JPN) 2013 FNo: 17-b	Ancient Hill (JPN); 2001	End Sweep	Forty Niner
Dam Corcovado (JPN) 2013 FNo: 17-b	Ancient Hill (JPN); 2001	End Sweep	Broom Dance
Dam Corcovado (JPN) 2013 FNo: 17-b	Ancient Hill (JPN); 2001	Aztec Hill	Proud Truth
Dam Corcovado (JPN) 2013 FNo: 17-b	Ancient Hill (JPN); 2001	Aztec Hill	Tribal Hill

- Redentor is inbred 4 x 5 to Mr. Prospector (Forty Niner's sire) and 4 x 5 to Northern Taste (Dyna Sash's sire)
