= Rachel Proudley =

English show jumper

Personal information
- Nationality: British
- Born: 7 July 2005 (age 21)

Sport
- Sport: Equestrian

Rachel Proudley (born 7 July 2005) is a British show jumper. She became 2025 Young Rider European Champion, and is a multiple winner of the puissance event.

== Early life ==
Rachel Proudley is from Kildale, near Great Ayton in North Yorkshire where her father, Paul, is a farmer. She started riding from a young age. In 2014, aged nine, she won the U12 competitions in the Graham Heath Construction National Championship and the Pure Seed Company National Tiny Tots, on Painted Lady IV. She won the British show jumping NAF 5 Star Silver League in 2021 on Cartino III, aged 16.

== Career ==
Riding Millfield Chrisis, Proudley won the Grand Prix at the Bramham International Horse Trials in June 2024. In the same month, the pair also won the Grade C HOYS Qualifier at The Royal Highland Show.

In October 2024, riding Petitfour VD Wareslage, she won the Speed Horse of the Year title at the Horse of the Year Show. At the same event she finished third in the NAEC Stoneleigh Cup with Quality Street. In December 2024, she cleared 2.12 metres to win the Puissance at the London International Horse Show on Easy Boy de Laubry Z; the combination retained the title at the 2025 edition with a jump of 2.21 metres (7 foot 3 inches).

In April 2025, she secured two championship wins at the Pony of the Year Show, in the Young Rider Under 25 classes. She won the KEP Italia Under 25 Championship with the top two places, winning with her new ride of four weeks, Nera D Champs FT, jointly owned by HK Horses and Irish jockey Oisin Murphy. She also won the Under 25 B and C Handicap Championship with HK Horses owned Next Quabri. In June 2025, riding Easy Boy De Laubry Z, she cleared 2.21 metres to share the title at the Bolesworth LeMieux puissance with Brendan Murphy on Erne Riverrun.

Competing for Great Britain at the 2025 Youth European Championships on HK Horses' Quality Street, Proudley claimed the Young Rider Individual Gold title, also winning the Team Bronze medal at the championships.

On 9 August 2025, Proudley riding Easy Boy de Laubry Z, won the Defender Puissance at the Dublin Horse Show, clearing 2.15m. In December, she and Easy Boy De Laubry Z repeated their win from the previous year in the puissance at the London Horse Show, once again clearing 2.21m (7ft 3in). Proudley won her seventh consecutive major puissance event at the 2026 Horse of the Year Show, where riding Easy Boy De Laubry Z, she reached the fifth and final round and cleared 2.18m (7ft 2in) to share the title with Andrew Hodgins and Shanaclough Luichew.
