= Exceed And Excel =

Australian Thoroughbred racehorse

- Sire: Danehill
- Grandsire: Danzig
- Dam: Patrona
- Damsire: Lomond
- Sex: Colt
- Foaled: 5 September 2000
- Country: Australia
- Colour: Bay
- Breeder: Ascot Breeding Partnership
- Owner: Darley Stud
- Trainer: Tim Martin
- Record: 12: 7–1–0
- Earnings: A$ 1,282,375

Major wins
- Todman Stakes (2003); Up and Coming Stakes (2003); Roman Consul Stakes (2003); Dubai Racing Club Cup (2003); Royal Sovereign Stakes (2004); Newmarket Handicap (2004)

Awards
- Australian Champion Sprinter (2003/04); Australian Champion Sire (2012/13)

Exceed And Excel (foaled 5 September 2000) is a retired multiple Group 1 winning Australian thoroughbred racehorse. After his racing career ended he has been successful as a breeding stallion, having sired over 150 Stakes winners.

== Background ==
The colt was purchased at the 2002 Inglis Easter yearling sale by his trainer Tim Martin. Martin had previously never paid more than $30,000 for a horse but purchased him for A$375,000. At the time, he had no future owner in line for the horse. After what Martin described as a "scary" two weeks, he drew Sydney lawyer Alan Osburg into a 50% interest while the remaining equity was later taken by businessman Nick Moraitis.

== Racing career ==
In Australia he only raced as a two-year-old and three-year-old. His main success came as a three-year-old when he won the Group 1 Dubai Racing Club Cup and the Newmarket Handicap, on both occasions ridden by Corey Brown. His last race was in the 2004 July Cup in England but he finished unplaced.

== Stud career ==
Exceed And Excel was sold to Darley Stud for a reported record A$ 22 million. He was retired from stud duties in March 2024, aged 23. At the time of his retirement he had sired 215 individual stakes race winners, including 18 Group 1 winners. He is the only Australian-bred sire to have sired more than 200 individual stakes winners. In addition, through one of his crops, Margot Did, Exceed and Excel became the damsire to Justin Milano, winner of the 2024 Satsuki Shō.

=== Notable stock ===
Exceed And Excel has sired 19 individual Group 1 winners:

c = colt, f = filly, g = gelding

Foaled	Name	Sex	Major wins
2006	Reward For Effort	c	Blue Diamond Stakes
2008	Excelebration	c	Prix du Moulin de Longchamp, Prix Jacques Le Marois, Queen Elizabeth II Stakes
2008	Helmet	c	Sires' Produce Stakes, Caulfield Guineas
2008	Margot Did	f	Nunthorpe Stakes
2009	Amber Sky	g	Al Quoz Sprint
2009	Flamberge	g	The Goodwood, Oakleigh Plate, William Reid Stakes
2010	Guelph	f	Sires' Produce Stakes, Champagne Stakes, Flight Stakes, The Thousand Guineas
2010	Overreach	f	Golden Slipper Stakes
2011	Earthquake	f	Blue Diamond Stakes
2011	Outstrip	c	Breeders' Cup Juvenile Turf
2012	Mr Stunning	g	Hong Kong Sprint (twice), Chairman's Sprint Prize
2016	Bivouac	c	Golden Rose Stakes, Newmarket Handicap, VRC Sprint Classic
2016	Exceedance	c	Coolmore Stud Stakes
2016	Microphone	c	Sires' Produce Stakes
2016	Queen Supreme	f	Paddock Stakes
2017	September Run	f	Coolmore Stud Stakes, William Reid Stakes
2020	Cylinder	c	Newmarket Handicap
2020	Mawj	f	1000 Guineas Stakes, Queen Elizabeth II Challenge Cup Stakes
2020	Mischief Magic	c	Breeders' Cup Juvenile Turf Sprint

== Pedigree ==
Pedigree of Exceed And Excel (AUS) 2000
Sire Danehill (USA) 1986	Danzig (USA); 1977	Northern Dancer	Nearctic
Sire Danehill (USA) 1986	Danzig (USA); 1977	Northern Dancer	Natalma
Sire Danehill (USA) 1986	Danzig (USA); 1977	Pas de Nom	Admiral's Voyage
Sire Danehill (USA) 1986	Danzig (USA); 1977	Pas de Nom	Petitioner
Sire Danehill (USA) 1986	Razyana (USA); 1981	His Majesty	Ribot
Sire Danehill (USA) 1986	Razyana (USA); 1981	His Majesty	Flower Bowl
Sire Danehill (USA) 1986	Razyana (USA); 1981	Spring Adieu	Buckpasser
Sire Danehill (USA) 1986	Razyana (USA); 1981	Spring Adieu	Natalma
Dam Patrona (USA) 1994	Lomond (USA); 1980	Northern Dancer	Nearctic
Dam Patrona (USA) 1994	Lomond (USA); 1980	Northern Dancer	Natalma
Dam Patrona (USA) 1994	Lomond (USA); 1980	My Charmer	Poker
Dam Patrona (USA) 1994	Lomond (USA); 1980	My Charmer	Fair Charmer
Dam Patrona (USA) 1994	Gladiolus (USA); 1974	Watch Your Step	Citation
Dam Patrona (USA) 1994	Gladiolus (USA); 1974	Watch Your Step	Stepwisely
Dam Patrona (USA) 1994	Gladiolus (USA); 1974	Klairessa	Carry Back
Dam Patrona (USA) 1994	Gladiolus (USA); 1974	Klairessa	Foxbritches
