= Urban Chic =

Japanese thoroughbred racehorse

Urban Chic アーバンシック
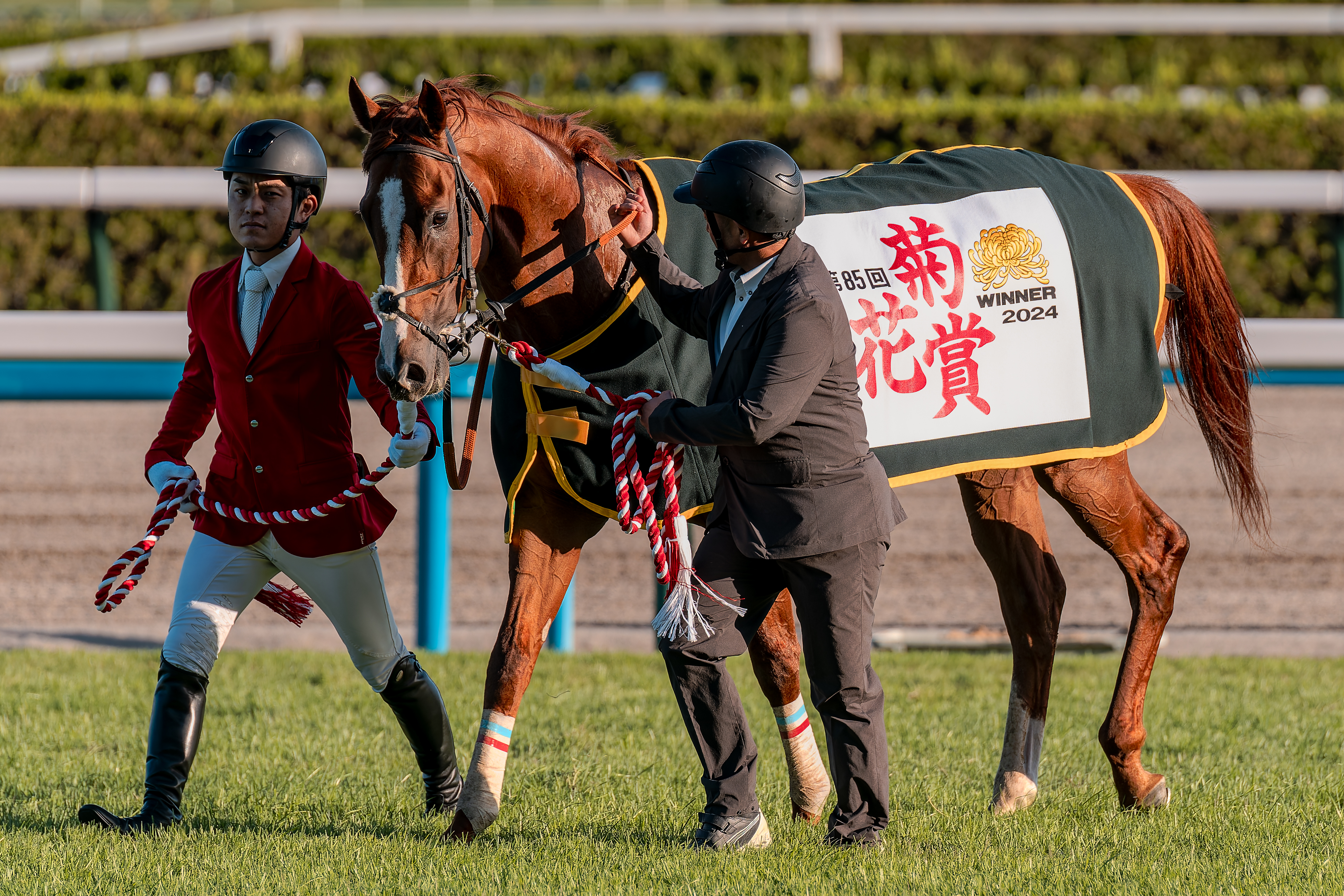
- Urban Chic after winning the 2024 Kikka Sho
- Breed: Thoroughbred
- Sire: Suave Richard
- Grandsire: Heart's Cry
- Dam: Edgy Style
- Damsire: Harbinger
- Sex: Colt
- Foaled: March 16, 2021 (age 5)
- Color: Chestnut
- Breeder: Northern Farm
- Owner: Silk Racing
- Racing colours
- Trainer: Ryo Takei
- Jockey: Christophe Lemaire
- Record: 14: 4-1-1
- Earnings: 401,912,000 JPY

Major wins
- St Lite Kinen (2024); Japanese Classic Race wins: Kikuka-shō (2024)
- Last updated on August 30, 2026

Urban Chic (Japanese: アーバンシック, Hepburn: Āban Shikku; foaled March 16, 2021) is a Japanese racehorse. His major wins include the 2024 Kikka Sho and St Lite Kinen.

The horse's name, meaning "sophisticated", is a reference to his dam's name.

== Racing career ==
=== 2023: two-year-old season ===
Urban Chic debuted in a race held over a course of 1,800 meters at Sapporo Racecourse with Takeshi Yokoyama as his jockey. He ran most of the race among the pack before passing over the rest on the final stretch, clinching his first victory. Urban Chic also won his next race, the Hyakunichiso Tokubetsu, by passing the pack from behind.

=== 2024: three-year-old season ===
Urban Chic started the season off with his first graded race, the Keisei Hai held on January 14th at Nakayama Racecourse. While he was able to cover the last three furlongs in 33.9 seconds, he was unable to cover for the loss of meandering in to the inside, leading him to finish second behind future Derby winner Danon Decile. This marked his first defeat. In his first Grade I race, the Satsuki Shō, he finished fourth. At the Tokyo Yushun (Japanese Derby), he was unable to make a pass and finished 11th.

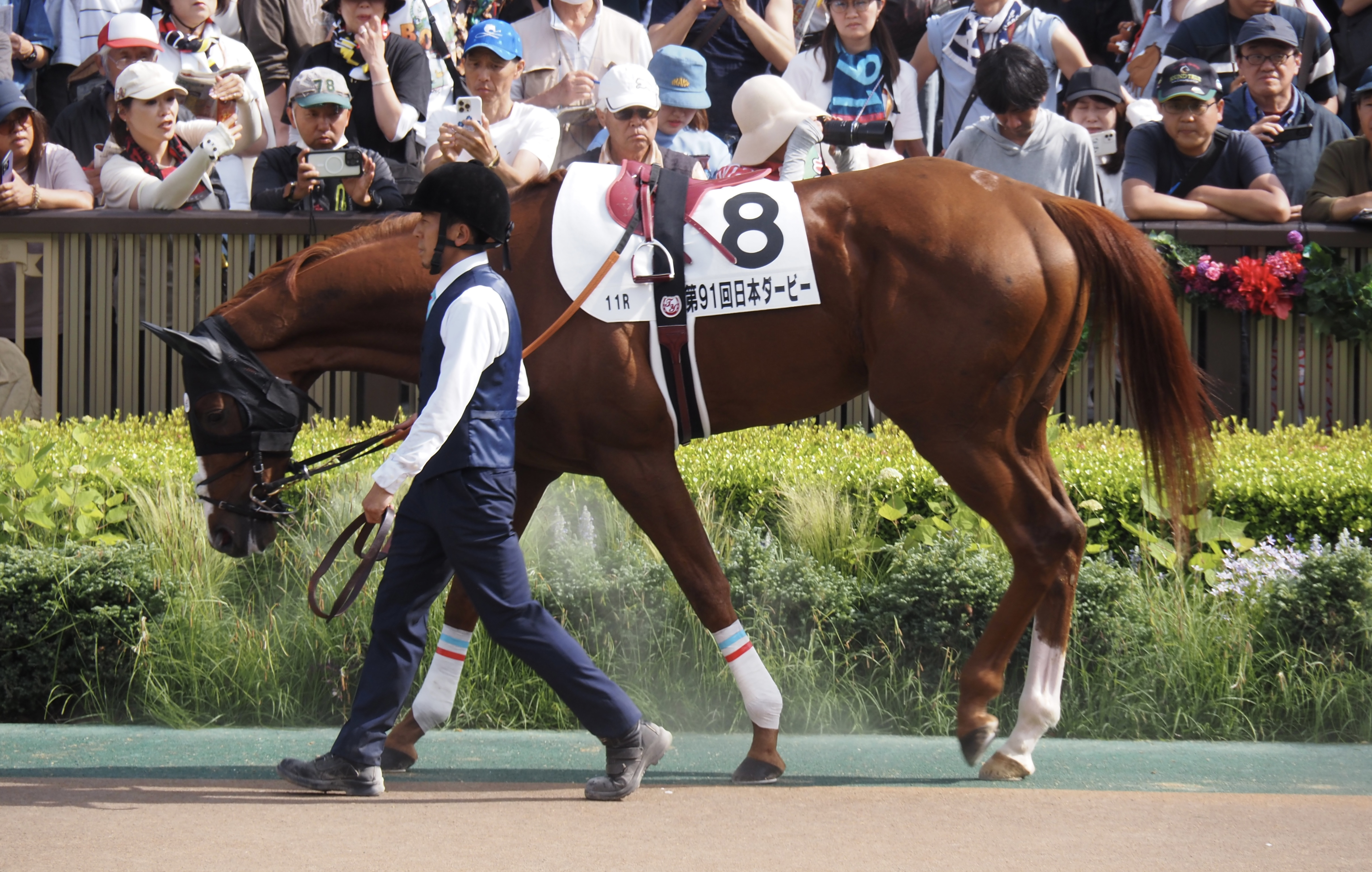
At the parade ring of the 2024 Japanese Derby

He spent the summer recuperating and came back to the turf at the St Lite Kinen in Autumn. After running among the pack on the inside of the field, he slowly started to push up his position before showing immense speed on the final stretch. He passed the others in the field and managed to score his first graded race victory after his unimpressive last race.

On the Kikka Sho held on October 20, after moving up from the middle to the front of the pack, quickly passed the rest of the pack on the final stretch, leading the horse to win his first Grade I title. This was the third St Lite Kinen winner, after Symboli Rudolf and Kitasan Black, to win the Kikka Sho since Japan adopted graded race. Also, at this race, the groom in charge, Makoto Gunji, won the Best Turned Out Award.

Urban Chic was announced to end his season at the Arima Kinen in December, sticking with Lemaire as his jockey. As the race favourite, he missed his break but recovered well into the middle position, running in the inside lane. He had a good striking position leading up to the third corner, but he struggled to climb uphill in the later phase and finished in sixth place.

=== 2025: four-year-old season ===
Opening up the new season, Urban Chic ran in the Nikkei Sho at the end of March. On a slightly less firm track, the horse broke well at the start. He took the final corner with ease but failed to accelerate on the hill section after passing it. He finished the race in third place behind the winner, Meiner Emperor. The next race he joined would be the Takarazuka Kinen in June, his first ever grade 1 race in five months. When the gates opened, he was out struck and ran the most of the race as the backmarker in 14th position. He never improved along the way and finished in 14th place in the end.

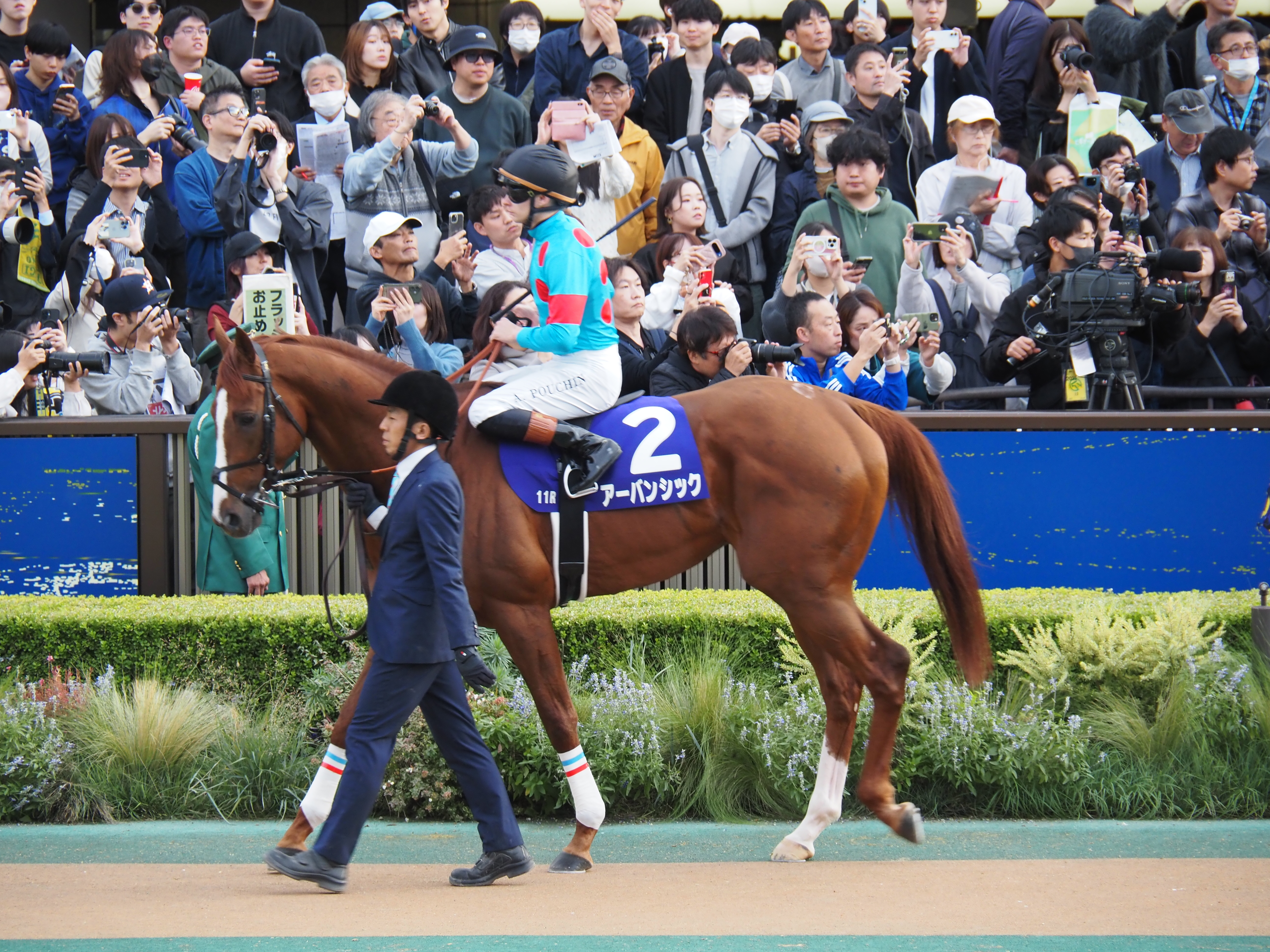
Urban Chic at the paddock in 2025 Tenno Sho (Autumn).

He was rested for the rest of the summer and resumed his season at the Tenno Sho (Autumn) in early November. His handler this time around would be a short-term licensed jockey from France, Alexis Pouchin. In the early phase, Pouchin rode him mostly at the second most rear from the pack. He gradually made his chase as the race progressed, but there was too much ground to cover once he reached the final straight. He finished in fifth place. After this race, his team accepted an invitation to join the Hong Kong Vase, which would be his first-ever overseas race. Lemaire, who made his comeback this race, pushed Urban Chic to be among the leading pack as the race started. This strategy did not work out as he gassed out in the final straight and fell back in the pecking order. He finished second last in tenth place that day. Lemaire said that Urban Chic was relaxed in the front but just could not reach the speed to close it out. The horse returned home on December 17 and rested for the next year campaign.

=== 2026: five-year-old season ===
Early in this year, his team rejected two race offer from Qatar and Dubai because they decided to put him in the Kinko Sho instead. He would be switching jockeys again on this occasion, as Kosei Miura would take the reins. In the pre-race workout, Takei explained that they found his finishing kick lacking, but his movements, responses, and physical condition were excellent. He performed terribly on race day as he finished dead last, 14th place behind Shake Your Heart. Miura said he was disappointed that the horse could not fulfill his true potential on the day. Due to recent poor performance, the team sent him back to Northern Farm as they trained for the summer race, which would be the Niigata Kinen in late August.

Approaching race day, Takei explained the horse's current condition. He said that the horse was not breathing well, but it had improved in training. He also claimed that despite this being the first time he raced at Niigata, he was confident on the adaptability of the said horse. Contrary to what the trainer said, Miura, who's continued as his jockey, felt that the track did not suit him and struggled early. He made a late push in the final furlongs and finished in fifth place that day. Miura commented on how he tried to alleviate the pain of coming out of the gate (referencing to his botched start at last season's Hong Kong Vase) during the race and also praised that the horse made good ground to become a good competitive GI horse once again.

== Racing Form ==
The form below is based on information available on netkeiba and JBIS.

Date	Track	Race	Grade	Distance (Condition)	Entry	HN	Odds (Favored)	Finish	Time	Margin	Jockey	Winner (Runner-up)
2023 – two-year-old season
Aug 13	Sapporo	2YO Debut Race		1,800m (Firm)	10	6	2.3 (1)	1st	1:53.1	0.0	Takeshi Yokoyama	(Victoria Doll)
Nov 5	Tokyo	Hyakunichiso Tokubetsu	L	2,000m (Firm)	9	4	4.1 (3)	1st	1:59.4	-0.1	Takeshi Yokoyama	(Margot Solare)
2024 – three-year-old season
Jan 14	Nakayama	Keisei Hai	GIII	2,000m (Firm)	15	6	3.0 (2)	2nd	2:00.6	0.1	Takeshi Yokoyama	Danon Decile
Apr 14	Nakayama	Satsuki Shō	GI	2,000m (Firm)	18	9	14.2 (6)	4th	1:57.5	0.4	Takeshi Yokoyama	Justin Milano
May 26	Tokyo	Tōkyō Yūshun	GI	2,400m (Firm)	18	8	8.3 (4)	11th	2:25.4	1.1	Takeshi Yokoyama	Danon Decile
Sep 16	Nakayama	St Lite Kinen	GII	2,200m (Firm)	14	1	3.1 (2)	1st	2:11.6	-0.3	Christophe Lemaire	(Cosmo Kuranda)
Oct 20	Kyoto	Kikka Sho	GI	3,000m (Firm)	18	13	3.7 (2)	1st	3:04.1	-0.4	Christophe Lemaire	(Redentor)
Dec 22	Nakayama	Arima Kinen	GI	2,500m (Firm)	15	3	2.8 (1)	6th	2:32.3	0.5	Christophe Lemaire	Regaleira
2025 – four-year-old season
Mar 29	Nakayama	Nikkei Sho	GII	2,500m (Good)	15	7	1.7 (1)	3rd	2:36.2	0.1	Christophe Lemaire	Meiner Emperor
Jun 15	Hanshin	Takarazuka Kinen	GI	2,200m (Good)	17	13	10.6 (6)	12th	2:13.5	2.4	Christophe Lemaire	Meisho Tabaru
Nov 2	Tokyo	Tenno Sho (Autumn)	GI	2,000m (Firm)	14	2	28.2 (11)	5th	1:58.8	0.2	Alexis Pouchin	Masquerade Ball
Dec 14	Sha Tin	Hong Kong Vase	GI	2,400m (Good)	11	6	4.5 (4)	10th	2:30.16	2.1	Christophe Lemaire	Sosie
2026 – five-year-old season
Mar 15	Chukyo	Kinko Sho	GII	2,000m (Firm)	14	4	11.9 (7)	14th	1:59.1	1.0	Kosei Miura	Shake Your Heart
Aug 30	Niigata	Niigata Kinen	GIII	2,000m (Good)	11	9	18.4 (7)	5th	1:59.9	0.3	Kosei Miura	Zoroastro

Legend:
Turf

== Pedigree ==
Pedigree of Urban Chic
Sire Suave Richard ch. 2014	Heart's Cry b 2001	Sunday Silence	Halo
Sire Suave Richard ch. 2014	Heart's Cry b 2001	Sunday Silence	Wishing Well
Sire Suave Richard ch. 2014	Heart's Cry b 2001	Irish Dance	Tony Bin
Sire Suave Richard ch. 2014	Heart's Cry b 2001	Irish Dance	Buper Dance
Sire Suave Richard ch. 2014	*Pirramimma dk.b. 2005	Unbridled's Song	Unbridled
Sire Suave Richard ch. 2014	*Pirramimma dk.b. 2005	Unbridled's Song	Trolley Song
Sire Suave Richard ch. 2014	*Pirramimma dk.b. 2005	Career Collection	General Meeting
Sire Suave Richard ch. 2014	*Pirramimma dk.b. 2005	Career Collection	River of Stars
Dam Edgy Style ch. 2013	*Harbinger b. 2006	Dansili	Danehill
Dam Edgy Style ch. 2013	*Harbinger b. 2006	Dansili	Hasili
Dam Edgy Style ch. 2013	*Harbinger b. 2006	Penang Pearl	Bering
Dam Edgy Style ch. 2013	*Harbinger b. 2006	Penang Pearl	Guapa
Dam Edgy Style ch. 2013	Land's Edge ch. 2006	Dance in the Dark	Sunday Silence
Dam Edgy Style ch. 2013	Land's Edge ch. 2006	Dance in the Dark	Dancing Key
Dam Edgy Style ch. 2013	Land's Edge ch. 2006	Wind in Her Hair	Alzao
Dam Edgy Style ch. 2013	Land's Edge ch. 2006	Wind in Her Hair	Burghclere (GB) (Family: 2-f)

- Urban Chic is inbred 3x4 to Sunday Silence, meaning the horse's name appears in both the third and fourth generations of this pedigree.
- Urban Chic's granddam, Land's Edge, is the half-sister to Black Tide, who sired Kitasan Black as well as Deep Impact.
- Urban Chic's great-granddam, Wind in Her Hair, won the Aral-Pokal in Germany, while her granddam, Highclere, won the Prix de Diane and the 1000 Guineas Stakes.
- Urban Chic also shares a mare line with Regaleira (Arima Kinen) and Stellenbosch (Oka Sho).
