= Diamond Stakes (Japan) =

Diamond Stakes ダイヤモンドステークス
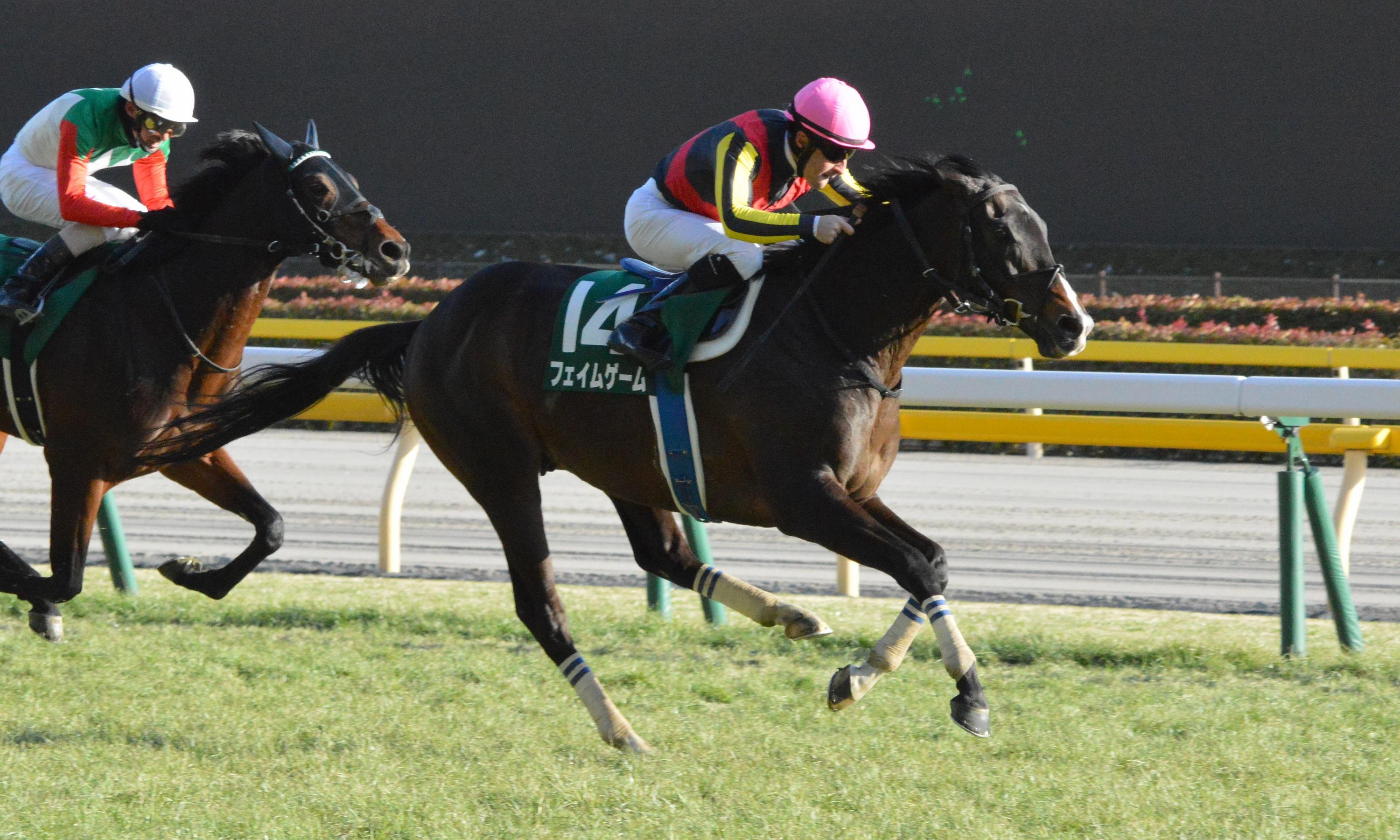
- Fame Game winning the 2018 Diamond Stakes
- Class: Grade 3
- Location: Tokyo Racecourse
- Inaugurated: 1951
- Race type: Thoroughbred Flat racing

Race information
- Distance: 3400 metres
- Surface: Turf
- Track: Left-handed
- Qualification: 4-y-o+
- Weight: Handicap
- Purse: ¥ 92,980,000 (as of 2026): 1st: ¥ 43,000,000; 2nd: ¥ 17,000,000; 3rd: ¥ 11,000,000

The Diamond Stakes (Japanese ダイヤモンドステークス) is a Grade 3 horse race for Thoroughbreds aged four and over, run in February over a distance of 3400 metres on turf at Tokyo Racecourse.

The Diamond Stakes was first run in 1951 and has held Grade 3 status since 1984. In its early years, the race was usually run at Nakayama Racecourse and returned to that track in 1985, 1986 and 2003. It was usually run over 2600 metres, until 1964.

== Winners since 2000 ==
Year	Winner	Age	Jockey	Trainer	Owner	Time
2000	Yusei Top Run	7	Hiroki Goto	Hidetaka Otonashi	Asahi Club	3:17.5
2001	Ibuki Yamano O	6	Olivier Peslier	Masazo Ryoke	Ibuki	3:18.0
2002	King The Fact	5	Hiroki Goto	Kiyoshi Tani	Kazuo Nishiura	3:19.8
2003	Ingrandire	4	Junichi Kobayashi	Yoshinami Shimizu	Chizu Yoshida	3:23.7
2004	Namura Thanks	5	Kunihiko Watanabe	Yoshiharu Matsunaga	Nobushige Namura	3:31.9
2005	Win Glanz	5	Masami Matsuoka	Keiji Takaichi	Win	3:33.5
2006	Macky Max	6	Shinji Fujita	Hideaki Fujiwara	Toru Makiura	3:30.3
2007	Tokai Trick	5	Christophe Lemaire	Shoichi Matsumoto	Masanori Uchimura	3:30.6
2008	Admire Monarch	7	Katsumi Ando	Hiroyoshi Matsuda	Riichi Kondo	3:33.6
2009	Monte Kris S	4	Hiroshi Kitamura	Kunihide Matsuda	Yoshiaki Mori	3:29.4
2010	Forgettable	4	Yutaka Take	Yasuo Ikee	Kaneko Makoto Holdings	3:32.6
2011	Cosmo Meadow	4	Anthony Crastus	Shigenori Hatakeyama	Big Red Farm	3:31.9
2012	Keiai Dosojin	6	Yutaka Yoshida	Yasuhito Tamura	Keiai Orthopedic Appliance	3:36.8
2013	Admire Rakti	5	Hiroyuki Uchida	Tomoyuki Umeda	Riichi Kondo	3:31.9
2014	Fame Game	4	Hitoshi Kitamura	Yoshitada Munakata	Sunday Racing	3:30.2
2015	Fame Game	5	Hitoshi Kitamura	Yoshitada Munakata	Sunday Racing	3:31.9
2016	Twinkle	5	Masaki Katsuura	Kazuya Makita	Hiroshi Hatasa	3:37.8
2017	Albert	6	Ryan Moore	Noriyuki Hori	Masamichi Hayashi	3:35.2
2018	Fame Game	8	Christophe Lemaire	Yoshitada Munakata	Sunday Racing	3:31.6
2019	You Can Smile	4	Yasunari Iwata	Yasuo Tomomichi	Kaneko Makoto Holdings	3:31.5
2020	Miraieno Tsubasa	7	Daishi Ito	Yasuo Tomomichi	Nobuhiko Mishima	3:31.2
2021	Grandiose	6	Kousei Miura	Yasuhito Tamura	Sunday Racing	3:31.2
2022	T O Royal	4	Yuji Hishida	Inao Okada	Tomoya Ozasa	3:30.1
2023	Mixology	4	Atsuya Nishimura	Yasuyuki Tsujino	Yoshimasa Ema	3:29.1 (Note: Set the current track record)
2024	T O Royal	6	Yuji Hishida	Inao Okada	Tomoya Ozasa	3:30.2
2025	Redentor	4	Keita Tosaki	Tetsuya Kimura	Carrot Farm	3:32.2
2026	Stinger Glass	5	Christophe Lemaire	Yasuo Tomomichi	M's Racing	3:32.0

== Earlier winners ==
- 1951 - Koma O
- 1952 - Ikahodake
- 1953 - Takahata
- 1954 - Mineno Sugata
- 1955 - Takagiku
- 1956 - Otokitsu
- 1957 - Toshiwaka
- 1958 - Masa Takara
- 1959 - Aya Noboru
- 1960 - Kane Chiakra
- 1961 - Homareboshi
- 1962 - Grand Time
- 1963 - Yamano O
- 1964 - Kikuno Hikari
- 1965 - Miharukasu
- 1966 - Yamadori
- 1967 - Korehide
- 1968 - Ono Den O
- 1969 - Speed Symboli
- 1970 - Daishin Volgard
- 1971 - Speedy Wonder
- 1972 - Banrai
- 1973 - Toyo Asahi
- 1974 - Gold Rock
- 1975 - Hikaru Jinden
- 1976 - Fujino Parthia
- 1977 - Tosho Rock
- 1978 - Tofuku Sedan
- 1979 - Three Giants
- 1980 - Pretty Cast
- 1981 - Pure Symboli
- 1982 - Kyoei Promise
- 1983 - Takara Tenryu
- 1984 - Dai Sekitai
- 1985 - Hokkai Pegasus
- 1986 - Trademark
- 1987 - Dolsa Sport
- 1988 - Dyna Breeze
- 1989 - Slew O Dyna
- 1990 - Slew O Dyna
- 1991 - North Shuttle
- 1992 - Mr Cyclennon
- 1993 - Matikanetannhauser
- 1994 - Sengoku Silver
- 1995 - Air Dublin
- 1996 - Yu Sensho
- 1997 - Yu Sensho
- 1998 - Yusei Top Run
- 1999 - Tamamo Inazuma

== See also ==
- Horse racing in Japan
- List of Japanese flat horse races
