= Hayley Turner =

English jockey (born 1983)

Hayley Turner OBE
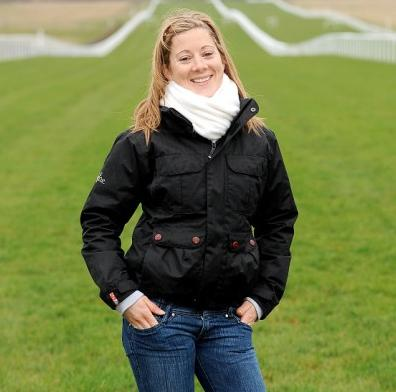

Personal information
- Born: 3 January 1983 (age 43)
- Occupation: Jockey

Horse racing career
- Sport: Horse racing

Major racing wins
- Major races July Cup (2011); Nunthorpe Stakes (2011)

Racing awards
- British flat racing Champion Apprentice (joint) (2005)

Significant horses
- Dream Ahead, Margot Did

Hayley Turner OBE (born 3 January 1983) is a retired English jockey who competed in flat racing. Originally from Nottingham, she was based in Newmarket for much of her career.

In 2008 Turner became the first woman to ride 100 UK flat race winners during a calendar year. She went on to win eight Group races, including two Group 1 races and a Grade 1 race. She retired from racing in 2015 and became a regular contributor to ITV Racing. She came out of retirement in 2018 and since then has ridden four winners at Royal Ascot. She rode her 1,000th winner in Great Britain in July 2024. She retired in April 2025.

== Background ==
Turner was born two miles from Nottingham Racecourse in north Nottinghamshire, one of six daughters of Kate and Richard Turner. Her mother was a riding instructor and she learnt to ride at an early age. She later rode out for local trainer Mark Polglase and attended a course at the Northern Racing College before becoming apprenticed to Michael Bell at Newmarket, Suffolk. Her first race ride was on Markellis at Southwell on 27 March 2000. Turner never finished the race, as the horse broke a leg and was euthanised. Her first winning ride was her eighth, on Generate at Pontefract on 4 June 2000. Bell sent her to Tom Amoss, in New Orleans for three months of training. She also spent the winter of 2004 riding out for Godolphin in Dubai.

In 2005 Turner was joint Champion Apprentice with Saleem Golam with 44 winners. She rode her 95th winner in September of that year, thereby "riding out her claim", only the fourth woman to do so in Britain.

== Racing career ==
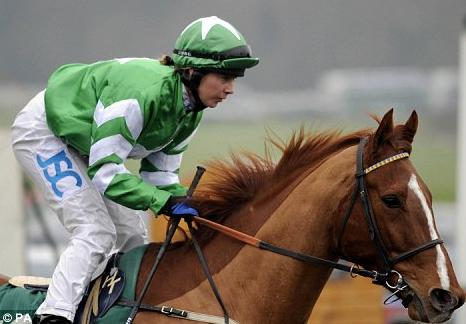

In 2008 Turner became the first female jockey to ride 100 winners in a calendar year in Britain, when Mullitovermaurice won at Wolverhampton on 30 December 2008. That year also saw high-profile handicap wins on Furnace at Chester and Ascot and on The Betchworth Kid at Doncaster. She secured her first Group race winner on Lady Deauville in the Group 3 Lando-Trophy in Germany on 16 November 2008. She was voted as Channel 4's Racing Personality for 2008.

In March 2009, Turner was badly injured in an accident on the Newmarket gallops. The head injury initially threatened to sideline her for the rest of the year, but fresh medical evidence allowed her to return to race-riding in mid-summer and she ended the year on 60 winners, her second highest figure. While unable to ride she made some guest appearances as a pundit on Channel 4 Racing.

The 2010 flat racing year continued to be successful for Turner; highlights included a first Group 1 ride on Barshiba in the Nassau Stakes at Glorious Goodwood, having won the Group 2 Lancashire Oaks on the same horse at Haydock a month earlier; and a successful partnership with classy two-year-old Margot Did, which included two winners and second places in two Group 3 races and a Group 2.

In January 2011, Turner had her first race-rides at the Meydan racecourse in Dubai, as part of the annual Dubai Racing Carnival. In July 2011 Turner rode her first Group 1 winner, Dream Ahead, in the July Cup at Newmarket. and repeated the feat the following month winning the Group 1 Nunthorpe Stakes on Margot Did during York's Ebor Meeting. A few weeks later she broke her ankle in a fall at Bath. She received the 'Most Inspirational Sportswoman' Award at the 2011 Jaguar Academy of Sport Annual Awards.

2012 saw Turner ride 92 winners, her second-best season, at a strike rate of 12%, also a career second-best. On 31 May 2012 she became the first female jockey to ride on the Dubai World Cup night. She rode Margot Did in the Al Quoz Sprint where she finished well back in the field. On 2 June 2012 she became the second female jockey to ride in the Epsom Derby. She rode Cavaliero where she came last of the nine horses running. In August 2012, Turner won the Beverly D. Stakes in the United States riding the David Simcock trained I'm a Dreamer, becoming the first UK-based woman to ride an international Grade 1 winner.

In 2013 Turner was twice sidelined by injuries, breaking an ankle in July and then in September sustaining damage to her pelvis and three vertebrae in a fall at Doncaster.

At the end of the 2015 season, Turner retired from race riding to take up a role in broadcasting with At The Races. She regained her jockey's licence to ride in the Shergar Cup team event at Ascot in August 2016. In January 2017 she became part of the newly-formed ITV Racing team. Later that year she rode regularly in France, where a 2 kg weight allowance for female jockeys had been introduced. In December 2017, Turner faced a British Horseracing Authority disciplinary panel when it emerged that she had opened an on-line betting account on her retirement and placed modest bets even though she still held a jockey's licence, which was a breach of racing rules. The panel suspended her licence for three months, acknowledging that the nature of her betting was no threat to the sport's integrity. After the suspension came to an end, Turner returned to regular race riding, with 44 winners in Britain 2018.

In June 2019, Turner achieved her first win at Royal Ascot when she took the Sandringham Handicap on 33/1 outsider Thanks Be. It was only the second time a female jockey had won at the meeting and 32 years since Gay Kelleway's win in 1987. Turner was given a nine-day suspension for her use of the whip on Thanks Be. The following year she won the same race again on another 33/1 outsider, Onassis. In 2022 she won the Palace of Holyroodhouse Stakes on Latin Lover, trained by Harry Eustace, and in 2023 she achieved her fourth win at Royal Ascot when Docklands, also trained by Eustace, won the Britannia Stakes.

In November 2023 Turner rode her 1,000th worldwide winner, becoming the first female jockey in Europe to do so. She achieved her 1,000th British win in July 2024.

By 2023, Turner had competed in the Shergar Cup a record sixteen times, twice winning the silver saddle as the leading jockey at the meeting (2018 and 2019). In 2024, she captained the Ladies team to victory and again won the silver saddle.

Turner announced her pregnancy and immediate retirement in April 2025.

== Honours ==
Turner was appointed Officer of the Order of the British Empire (OBE) in the 2016 Birthday Honours for services to horse racing.

== Personal life ==
Turner lives near Newmarket. She has coeliac disease and follows a gluten-free diet.

== Winners per year ==
Per calendar year

- 2025: 10 (1 January until retirement on 2 April)
- 2024: 31
- 2023: 38
- 2022: 37
- 2021: 48
- 2020: 20
- 2019: 28
- 2018: 45
- 2017: 16 (including 10 in France and 1 in Mauritius)
- 2016: 1
- 2015: 44
- 2014: 40
- 2013: 60
- 2012: 92
- 2011: 88 (injury ended season early)
- 2010: 73
- 2009: 60 (missed several months injured)
- 2008: 100
- 2007: 56
- 2006: 36
- 2005: 53
- 2004: 34 (including Apprentice Championship with 27 wins during Turf season)
- 2003: 14
- 2002: 9
- 2000: 1

== Major wins ==
(United Kingdom) Great Britain

- July Cup - (1) - Dream Ahead (2011)
- Nunthorpe Stakes - (1) - Margot Did (2011)

United States

- Beverly D. Stakes – (1) – I'm A Dreamer (2012)
