= Outstrip =

British Thoroughbred racehorse

- Racing silks of Godolphin
- Sire: Exceed And Excel
- Grandsire: Danehill
- Dam: Asi Siempre
- Damsire: El Prado
- Sex: Colt
- Foaled: 27 January 2011
- Country: United Kingdom
- Colour: Grey
- Breeder: Darley Stud
- Owner: Godolphin
- Trainer: Charlie Appleby
- Record: 8:3-1-2
- Earnings: £492,375

Major wins
- Champagne Stakes (2013); Breeders' Cup Juvenile Turf (2013)

Outstrip (foaled 27 January 2011) is a British Thoroughbred racehorse. He was one of the leading two-year-old in Britain in 2013 when he won the Champagne Stakes and was placed in both the Vintage Stakes and the Dewhurst Stakes. In November he was sent to the United States where he won the Breeders' Cup Juvenile Turf.

== Background ==
Outstrip is a grey colt bred by the Darley Stud. He was sired by the Australian stallion Exceed And Excel, whose other European progeny have included the Queen Elizabeth II Stakes winner Excelebration. Outstrip's dam, Asi Siempre, from whom he inherited his grey colour, was a top class American racemare whose wins included the Spinster Stakes. The colt was sent into training with Mahmood Al Zarooni at Godolphin's British base at Moulton Paddocks, in Newmarket, but the stable was taken over by Charlie Appleby when Zarooni was banned after a doping scandal.

== Racing career ==
=== 2013: two-year-old season ===
Outstrip was ridden in all his European races by Mickael Barzalona. He made his racecourse debut in a seven furlong maiden race at Newmarket Racecourse on 22 June. He was made the 4/1 third favourite in a field of twelve runners and recovered from a slow start to win by one and a half lengths from True Story. The colt was then moved up sharply in class for the Group Three Vintage Stakes at Goodwood Racecourse on 31 July. He took the lead a furlong from the finish but was overtaken in the final strides and was beaten a neck by the Richard Hannon, Sr.-trained favourite Toormore. Outsrip's next race was the Group Two Champagne Stakes at Doncaster Racecourse on 14 September. He started slowly but accelerated in the last quarter mile to take the lead a furlong from the finish and won by three lengths and a head from The Grey Gatsby and Cable Bay at odds of 13/8. Barzalona described the winner as "a nice horse who will improve for this race. He will be a serious horse next year." After the race bookmakers offered the horse at odds of 20/1 for the following year's 2000 Guineas.

On 12 October, Outstrip contested Britain's most prestigious two-year-old race, the Group One Dewhurst Stakes over seven furlongs at Newmarket. He started the 15/8 second favourite behind the Aidan O'Brien-trained War Command. Barzalona settled the colt behind the leaders but was unable to make significant progress in the closing stages and finished third behind War Command and Cable Bay. On his final appearance of the season, Outstrip was sent to California to contest the Grade I Breeders' Cup Juvenile Turf over one mile at Santa Anita Park. Ridden by the American veteran Mike Smith (Barzalona was committed to ride for Godolphin in Japan) he came from well off the pace to win from Giovanni Boldini and Bobby's Kitten.

In the official ratings published in January 2014, Outstrip was rated the sixth-best European two-year-old of 2013, five pounds behind of the Toormore.

=== 2014: three-year-old season ===
On his first appearance as a three-year-old, Outstrip started at odds of 25/1 for the 2000 Guineas over the Rowley Mile course at Newmarket on 3 May. He was held up in the early stages and after struggling to obtain a clear run in the final quarter mile he was eased down and finished last of the fourteen runners behind Night of Thunder. After his poor run at Newmarket, Outstrip started a 33/1 outsider for the St James's Palace Stakes at Royal Ascot. Ridden for the first time by William Buick he produced a much better effort to finish third, beaten two and a quarter lengths and a length by Kingman and Night of Thunder, despite his jockey dropping his whip a furlong from the finish. In the Sussex Stakes at Goodwood on 30 July Outstrip started at odds of 20/1 and finished last of the four runners behind Kingman, Toronado and Darwin.

== Stud career ==
Outstrip began his breeding career as a stallion at Darley Stud in England. In 2021 he was purchased by a group of breeders to stand in Brazil.

=== Notable progeny ===
c = colt, f = filly, g = gelding

Foaled	Name	Sex	Major Wins
2017	Gold Trip	c	Melbourne Cup, Turnbull Stakes

== Pedigree ==
Pedigree of Outstrip, grey colt, 2011
Sire Exceed And Excel (AUS) 2000	Danehill; 1986	Danzig	Northern Dancer
Sire Exceed And Excel (AUS) 2000	Danehill; 1986	Danzig	Pas de Nom
Sire Exceed And Excel (AUS) 2000	Danehill; 1986	Razyana	His Majesty
Sire Exceed And Excel (AUS) 2000	Danehill; 1986	Razyana	Spring Adieu
Sire Exceed And Excel (AUS) 2000	Patrona (USA); 1994	Lomond	Northern Dancer
Sire Exceed And Excel (AUS) 2000	Patrona (USA); 1994	Lomond	My Charmer
Sire Exceed And Excel (AUS) 2000	Patrona (USA); 1994	Gladiolus	Watch Your Step
Sire Exceed And Excel (AUS) 2000	Patrona (USA); 1994	Gladiolus	Back Britches
Dam Asi Siempre (USA) 2002	El Prado (IRE); 1989	Sadler's Wells	Northern Dancer
Dam Asi Siempre (USA) 2002	El Prado (IRE); 1989	Sadler's Wells	Fairy Bridge
Dam Asi Siempre (USA) 2002	El Prado (IRE); 1989	Lady Capulet	Sir Ivor
Dam Asi Siempre (USA) 2002	El Prado (IRE); 1989	Lady Capulet	Cap and Bells
Dam Asi Siempre (USA) 2002	Siempre Asi (USA); 1995	Silver Hawk	Roberto
Dam Asi Siempre (USA) 2002	Siempre Asi (USA); 1995	Silver Hawk	Gris Vitesse
Dam Asi Siempre (USA) 2002	Siempre Asi (USA); 1995	Turkish Treasure	Sir Ivor
Dam Asi Siempre (USA) 2002	Siempre Asi (USA); 1995	Turkish Treasure	Turban (Family:1-l)

Outstrip is inbred 4s x 4s x 4d to Northern Dancer. This means that the stallion appears three times in the fourth generation of his pedigree. He is also inbred 4d x 4d to Sir Ivor
