= Oisin Murphy =

Irish horse racing jockey

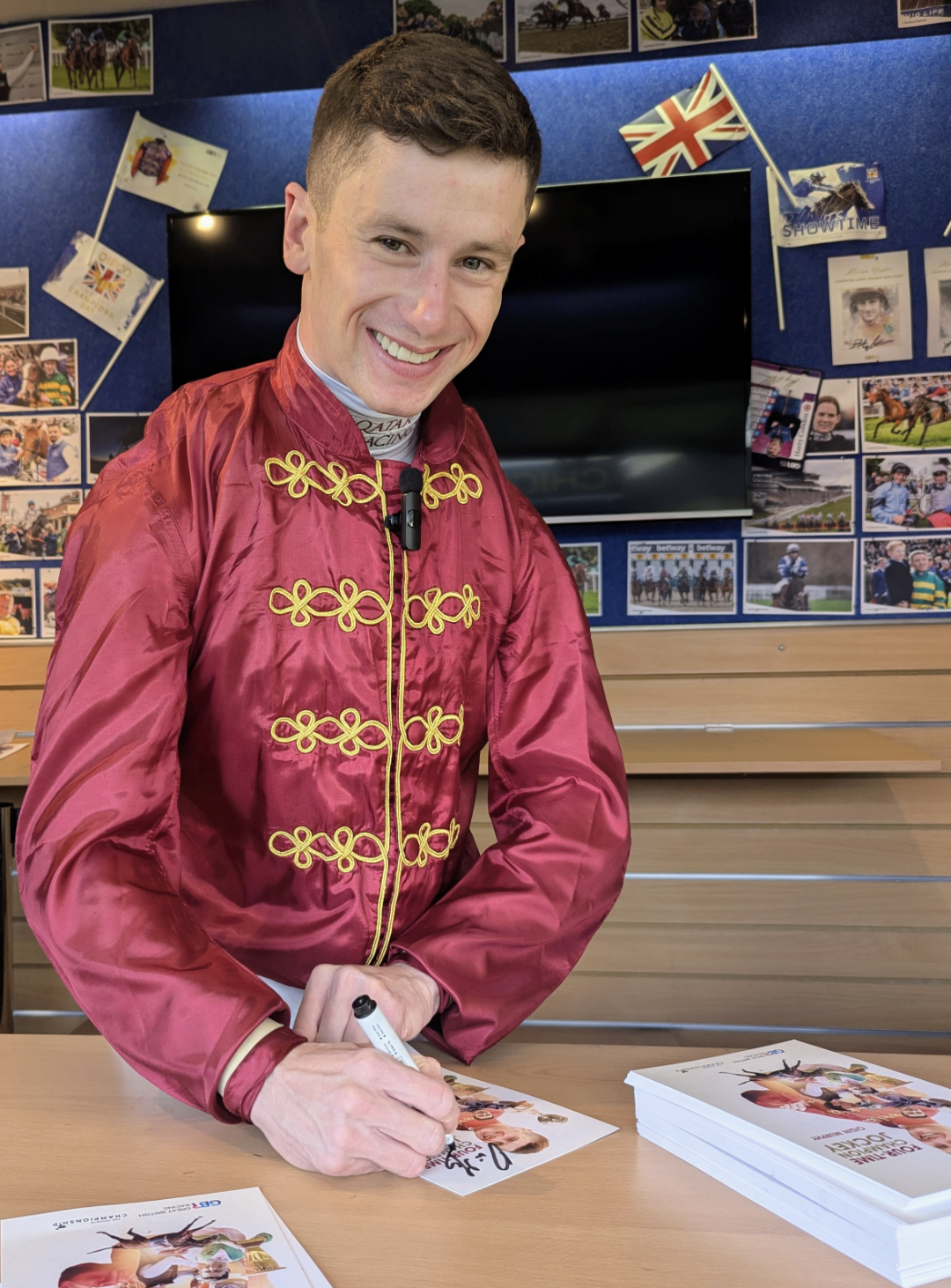
- Murphy at British Champions Day 2024

Personal information
- Born: 6 September 1995 (age 31) Killarney, County Kerry, Ireland
- Occupation: Jockey
- Height: 5 ft 6 in (168 cm)
- Weight: 8 st 7 lb (119 lb; 54 kg)
- Website: oisinmurphy.co.uk

Horse racing career
- Sport: Horse racing

Racing awards
- British Champion Apprentice (2014); British Champion Jockey (2019, 2020, 2021, 2024, 2025)

Oisin Murphy (born 6 September 1995) is an Irish jockey based in Britain who competes in flat racing. He has won two British Classics and a number of Group 1 races. He has been British Champion Jockey in 2019, 2020, 2021, 2024 and 2025.

== Early life ==
Murphy grew up in Killarney, County Kerry. A premature baby, he weighed just 2 lb 14 oz (1.3 kg) at birth. He started riding aged four and got his own pony, Rusty, when he was seven. When he was fourteen, the family moved to Buttevant, County Cork, so that Murphy could ride under the tutelage of his uncle Jim Culloty, three-time Cheltenham Gold Cup winner and Grand National winner. Having sat on a racehorse for the first time at the age of fourteen, Murphy abandoned his earlier ambition to be a show-jumper and embarked on the pony-racing circuit. When he was fifteen, he spent the summer at Tommy Stack's yard in County Tipperary and the following summer worked at Ballydoyle. In October 2012, at the age of seventeen, he moved to England and joined Andrew Balding's yard at Kingsclere in Berkshire.

== Career ==
=== Early career ===
Murphy made an instant impact in his first year as a professional jockey in 2013, winning four races on Ayr Gold Cup day in September, including the Ayr Gold Cup itself on Highland Colori. He then spent a winter in Australia, riding mainly for Danny O'Brien and gaining a total of 13 winners. Murphy conceded that he was "probably a little cheeky" in the past and said that he took a few punches from older jockeys in the weighing room. He credited Frankie Dettori with being the best jockey he had ridden against and having been supportive as his career as a young jockey progressed.

He gained his first Group success when partnering Hot Streak to victory in the Group 2 Temple Stakes at Haydock in May 2014 and went on to be crowned Champion Apprentice later that year. A second Group 2 came in the German 2,000 Guineas on Karpino in May 2015, followed by his biggest prize up until that point - the Ebor Handicap on Litigant in August.

In 2016, he became number one jockey to Qatar Racing and won 10 Group races on 10 different horses, including Lightning Spear (Celebration Mile) and Simple Verse (Park Hill Stakes).

In 2017 Benbatl, trained by Saeed bin Suroor, provided Murphy with his first Royal Ascot victory when he won the Group 3 Hampton Court Stakes. Murphy gained his first Group 1 victory at that year's Prix de l'Arc de Triomphe meeting aboard the Martyn Meade-trained Aclaim in the Prix de la Foret. This was followed by a Group 1 success in Canada when the Balding-trained Blond Me won the E.P. Taylor Stakes.

The following year, Murphy won a further nine Group 1 races, in five countries. Victories were provided by: Roaring Lion in the Coral-Eclipse, Juddmonte International Stakes, Irish Champion Stakes and Queen Elizabeth II Stakes; Benbatl in the Dubai Turf and the Bayerisches Zuchtrennen; Lightning Spear in the Sussex Stakes; The Tin Man in the Haydock Sprint Cup; and Royal Marine in the Prix Jean-Luc Lagardère.

=== 2019 to 2023 ===
There were four more Group 1 wins for Murphy in 2019, including aboard Japanese mare Deirdre in the Nassau Stakes at Goodwood and an international success on Suave Richard in the Japan Cup. In June 2019, Murphy tested positive for alcohol in a breath test. Although he was under the legal drink-driving limit, this was over the limit for race riding and he had to miss a day's racing at Salisbury. The incident affected his racing, but he closed the season well to be crowned British Champion Jockey for the first time.

Murphy achieved his first British Classic win in June 2020, when Kameko won the postponed 2000 Guineas. He retained his champion jockey title in the abbreviated 2020 season, winning 142 races, nine ahead of his closest rival, William Buick. Wins included the Cheveley Park Stakes on Alcohol Free and the Haydock Sprint Cup on Dream of Dreams. In November 2020 Murphy received a three-month ban for having tested positive for cocaine at a meeting in France in July. France Galop, the French governing body of racing, accepted Murphy's explanation that he had never taken cocaine himself but had tested positive through environmental contamination, having had sex the day before with a woman who was an occasional cocaine user.

Murphy returned from the ban for another successful season in 2021. He resumed his partnership with Alcohol Free, winning the Coronation Stakes and the Sussex Stakes. On 3 October 2021 he gained another Group 1 victory when he won the Prix Marcel Boussac at Longchamp on Zellie, trained by André Fabre, a few days after a parade ring incident at Salisbury had left him needing stitches in his lip when he was thrown by an unraced two-year-old. On 8 October he was stood down from his rides at Newmarket after failing a breath test, having been involved in a fracas in a Newmarket pub the previous evening. On 9 October he won the Cesarewitch Handicap on the Nicky Henderson trained Buzz. Murphy finished the 2021 season on 153 wins, two ahead of rival William Buick, and was crowned champion flat jockey for a third successive season on Champions Day at Ascot.

On 16 December 2021 it emerged that Murphy was facing disciplinary charges brought by the British Horseracing Authority (BHA) for a breach of COVID-19 travel protocols in 2020 and two failed breath tests in 2021. He announced that he had temporarily relinquished his licence. Murphy faced a disciplinary panel of the BHA on 22 February 2022. He admitted breaching coronavirus protocols, misleading the BHA and acting in a way that prejudiced the reputation of horseracing, as well as two alcohol breaches. He was banned until February 2023.

During his 14-month ban, Murphy rode out for trainers and concentrated on show jumping. His first ride back from the ban was a success aboard Jupiter Express at Chelmsford. Murphy said of his ban: "I made many, many errors that I wish I hadn't done. I was given a period time to think about that and come back with a different mindset, hopefully over the next year and the following years I can prove the person I'd like to be." Three months later and he secured a second Classic with victory on Mawj in the QIPCO 1000 Guineas. Other big-race victories in 2023 included the Commonwealth Cup at Royal Ascot on Shaquille and the Belmont Oaks on Aspen Grove.

=== 2024 to 2025 ===
Murphy rode four winners at Royal Ascot in 2024, including Asfoora in the Group 1 King Charles III Stakes and Khaadem in the Group 1 Queen Elizabeth II Jubilee Stakes. In September he travelled to Canada to take the Grade 1 Summer Stakes aboard New Century for Andrew Balding and Qatar Racing. He reclaimed the Champion Jockey title in October for a fourth time, secured by 163 winners (53 ahead of Rossa Ryan) at a 22% strike rate.

In the run-up to collecting his trophy, Murphy told BBC Sport that twice-weekly counselling had been a great help to him: "When things have got stressful this year, like a few days of not winning races, I've been able to use that time away from the saddle as perspective to realise that I'm very lucky that I'm healthy and back riding at a high level." He secured a fourth Group/Grade 1 of the year when steering Giavellotto to success in the Hong Kong Vase on 8 December.

Murphy finished second in the leading jockey standings at Royal Ascot 2025 with five wins, all of them in handicaps.

== Criminal conviction ==
On 19 June 2025, Murphy was charged by Thames Valley Police with driving while over the alcohol limit and failing to cooperate with a preliminary test at the roadside. The charges related to a single vehicle accident at 12.05 am on 27 April in Hermitage, Berkshire, which left a passenger injured. Murphy appeared at Reading Magistrates' Court on 3 July 2025 and pleaded guilty to driving while over the alcohol limit. He was not asked to plead to the other charge. The magistrates fined him £70,000 and imposed a 20-month driving ban. Following his conviction, the BHA said that Murphy would be subject to enhanced testing both on and off the racecourse with further conditions put on his licence, the details of which would remain confidential.

== Personal life ==
Murphy became an ambassador for QIPCO British Champions Series in 2015. He speaks Irish, English, French and German. He enjoys poetry and his favourite poet is Sylvia Plath. He is involved with showjumping and co-owns Nera D Champs FT, a winner at the Pony of the Year show in April 2025, ridden by Rachel Proudley.

== Major wins ==
Murphy has won the following Group 1 or Grade 1 races.

(United Kingdom) Great Britain

- 1000 Guineas - (1) Mawj (2023)
- 2000 Guineas - (1) Kameko (2020)
- Cheveley Park Stakes - (2) Alcohol Free (2020), Porta Fortuna (2023)
- City of York Stakes - (1) Never So Brave (2025)
- Commonwealth Cup - (1) Shaquille (2023)
- Coronation Cup - (1) Bay City Roller (2026)
- Coronation Stakes - (1) Alcohol Free (2021)
- Eclipse Stakes - (1) Roaring Lion (2018)
- Falmouth Stakes - (1) Veracious (2019)
- Haydock Sprint Cup - (2) The Tin Man (2018), Dream of Dreams (2020)
- International Stakes - (1) Roaring Lion (2018)
- King Charles III Stakes - (1) Asfoora (2024)
- Lockinge Stakes - (1) Lead Artist (2025)
- Nassau Stakes - (1) Deirdre (2019)
- Nunthorpe Stakes - (1) Asfoora (2025)
- Queen Elizabeth II Stakes - (2) Roaring Lion (2018), Khaadem (2024)
- Sussex Stakes - (2) Lightning Spear (2018), Alcohol Free (2021)
- Vertem Futurity Trophy - (1) Kameko (2019)

(Republic of Ireland) Ireland

- Irish Champion Stakes - (1) Roaring Lion (2018)

France

- Critérium International - (1) Sunway (2023)
- Prix de l'Abbaye - (1) Asfoora (2025)
- Prix du Cadran - (1) Caballo De Mar (2026)
- Prix de la Foret - (1) Aclaim (2017)
- Prix Jean-Luc Lagardère - (1) Royal Marine (2018)
- Prix Marcel Boussac - (1) Zellie (2021)
- Prix Maurice de Gheest - (1) Sajir (2025)
- Prix Morny - (1) Senorita Bonita (2026)
- Prix Vicomtesse Vigier - (1) Caballo De Mar (2026)

Hong Kong

- Hong Kong Vase - (1) Giavellotto (2024)

Canada

- E. P. Taylor Stakes - (1) Blond Me (2017)
- Summer Stakes - (1) New Century (2024)

Germany

- Bayerisches Zuchtrennen - (2) Benbatl (2018), Tornado Alert (2025)

Saudi Arabia

- Neom Turf Cup - (1) Royal Champion (2026)

United Arab Emirates

- Dubai Turf - (1) Benbatl (2018)

Japan

- Japan Cup - (1) Suave Richard (2019)

United States

- Belmont Oaks - (1) Aspen Grove (2023)
- Queen Elizabeth II Challenge Cup Stakes - (1) Mawj (2023)
- Breeders' Cup Distaff - (1) Marche Lorraine (2021)
- Breeders' Cup Juvenile Fillies Turf - (1) Balantina (2025)
