= Justin Milano =

Japanese racehorse (born 2021)

Justin Milano ジャスティンミラノ
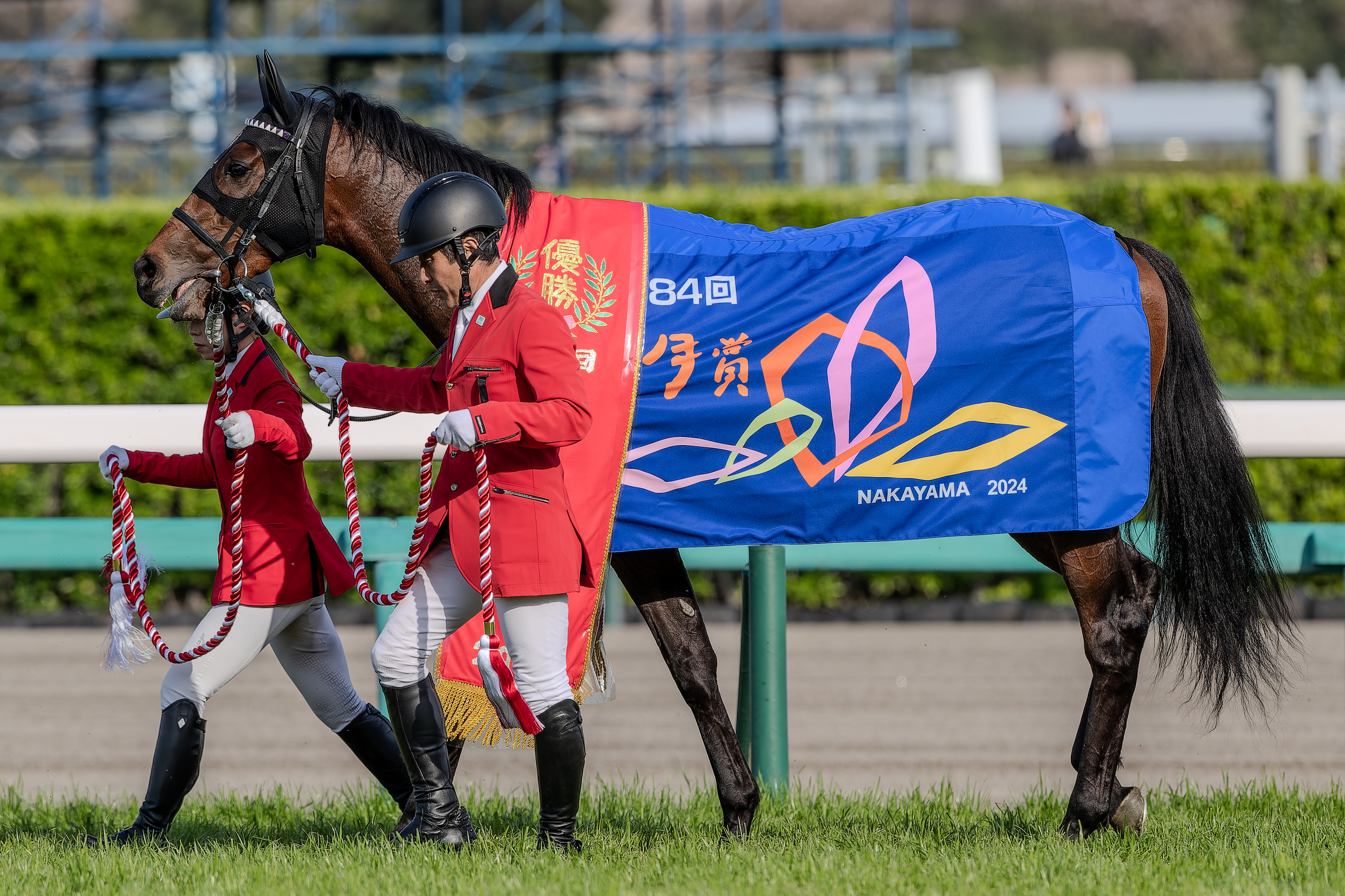
- 2024 Satsuki Sho
- Sire: Kizuna
- Grandsire: Deep Impact
- Dam: Margot Did
- Damsire: Exceed And Excel
- Sex: Colt
- Foaled: April 9, 2021 (age 5)
- Country: Japan
- Color: Bay
- Breeder: Northern Farm
- Owner: Masahiro Miki
- Racing colors
- Trainer: Yasuo Tomomichi
- Jockey: Keita Tosaki
- Record: 4:3-1-0
- Earnings: 403,069,000 JPY

Major wins
- Kyodo Tsushin Hai (2024); Japanese Classic Race wins: Satsuki Shō (2024)
- Last updated on May 26, 2024

Justin Milano (Japanese: ジャスティンミラノ, Hepburn: Jasutin Mirano; foaled April 9, 2021) is a retired Japanese Thoroughbred racehorse. He won the Satsuki Shō (Japanese 2000 Guineas) in 2024.

His name is a combination of the Italian city Milan, and "Justin", the eponym used by the owner.

== Racing career ==
=== 2023: two-year-old-season ===
Justin Milano debuted on November 11, 2023, at the Tokyo Racecourse in a two-year-old newcomer race on turf at a distance of 2,000 meters, ridden by Tom Marquand. He settled in front of the pack and pulled away fast at the final stretch to win his debut race.

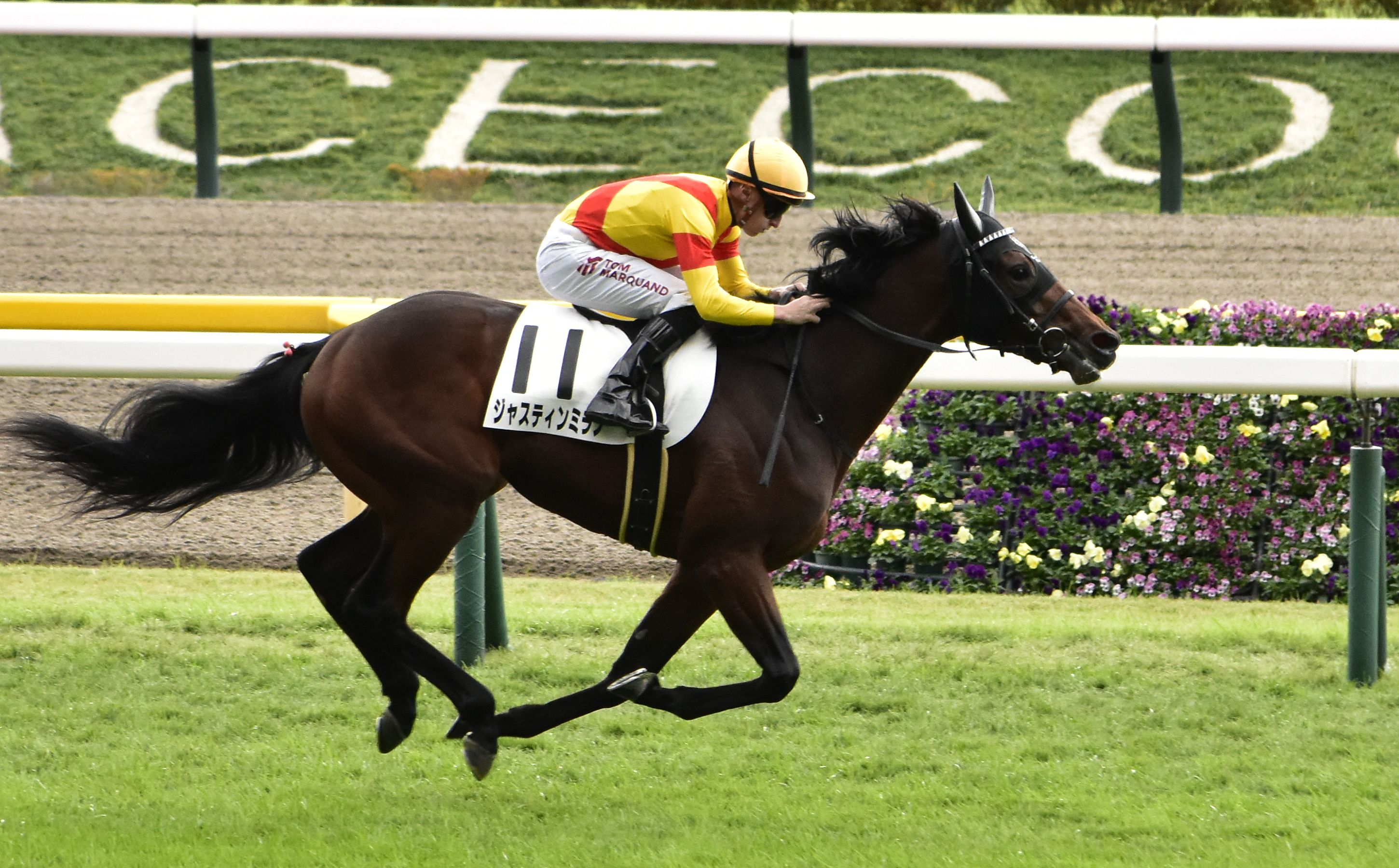
Justin Milano winning his race debut

=== 2024: three-year-old season ===
Justin Milano would make his first graded stakes race debut at the Kyodo Tsushin Hai on February 11, 2024. Ridden by Keita Tosaki, he settled in just behind the leader and moved forward after entering the final stretch in response to Tosaki's urging to take the lead, managing to successfully hold off the previous year's Asahi Hai Futurity Stakes winner Jantar Mantar to win by one and a half horse length. On February 28, it was announced by his connections that he was registered to compete in the Epsom Derby.

Canceling the previous plan to enter the Epsom Derby, he was instead scheduled to race at the Satsuki Shō (Japanese 2000 Guineas) on April 14. He broke well off from the gates at the start of the race and settled in at the middle of the pack near the front. Entering into the final straight, he overtook Jantar Mantar who took the lead early and managed to hold off the fast-finishing Cosmo Kuranda, breaking the track record by 0.7 seconds with a time of 1:57.1 seconds. This was his first grade one stakes victory. A week before the race, jockey Kota Fujioka, who rode for him whenever he was training, died in a horseracing accident. His jockey, Keita Tosaki, said, "Kota was the one who trained with this horse a few weeks ago. He gave me the information I needed about the horse. I won this race because of him." His trainer, Yasuo Tomomichi, said with tears in his eyes, "I owe this victory to him (Kota)." This victory marked the first time that a Kizuna offspring won one of the eight major races (Note: Eight major races include the five original classics namely: Oka Sho, Yushun Himba, Satsuki Shō, Tōkyō Yūshun, and Kikuka-shō, and three senior races: Tenno Sho Spring and Autumn editions, and the Arima Kinen.) in Japanese horseracing.

He ran in the Tōkyō Yūshun as scheduled on May 26. He was the most favored horse to win by post time. After settling in near the front throughout the early and middle parts of the race, he moved up in the final straight but failed to pass Danon Decile, who had burst out from the inner lane near the fence. He finished in second place, trailing by two lengths.

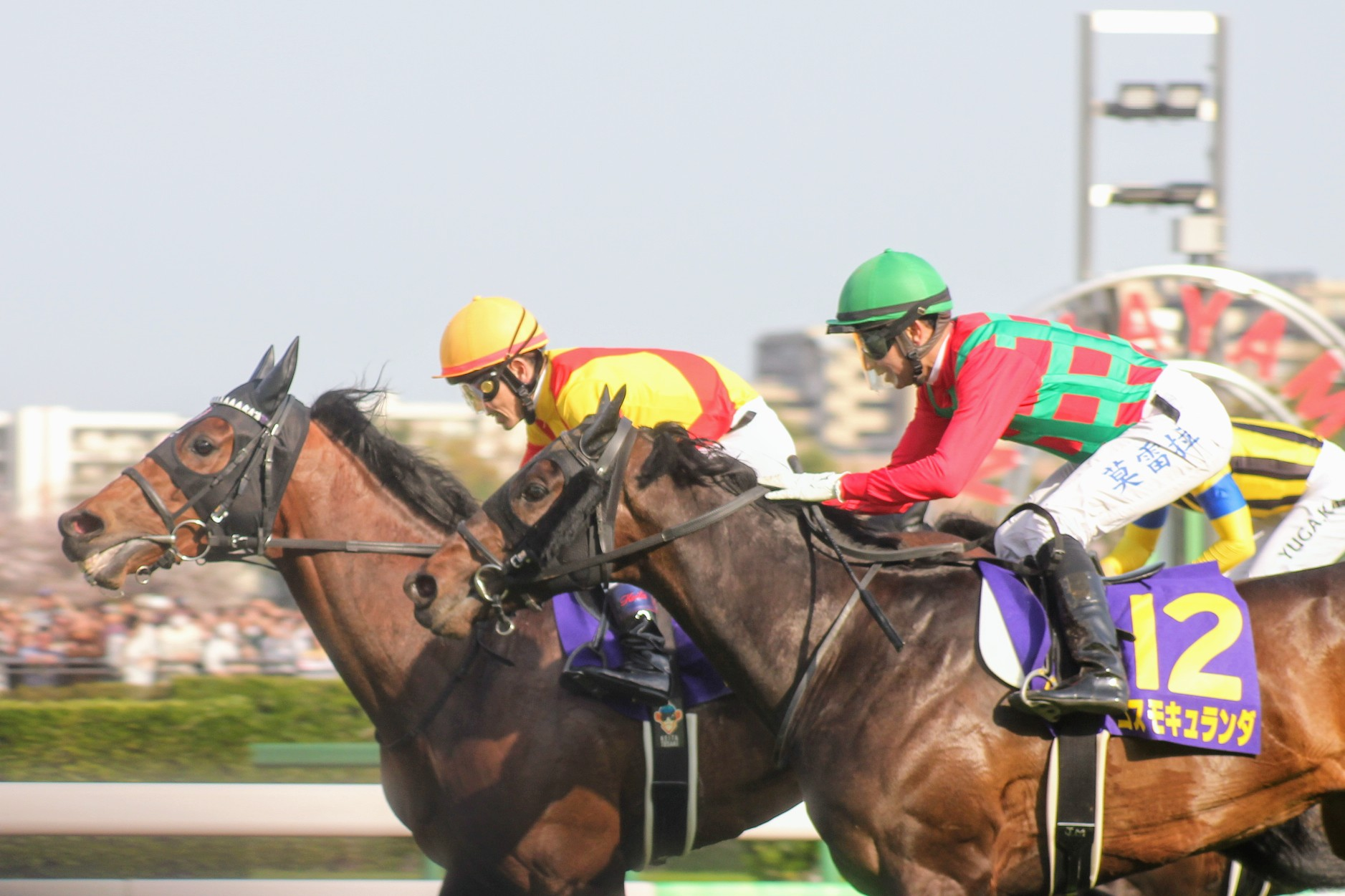
Justin Milano wins the Satsuki Sho with Cosmo Kuranda finishing second.

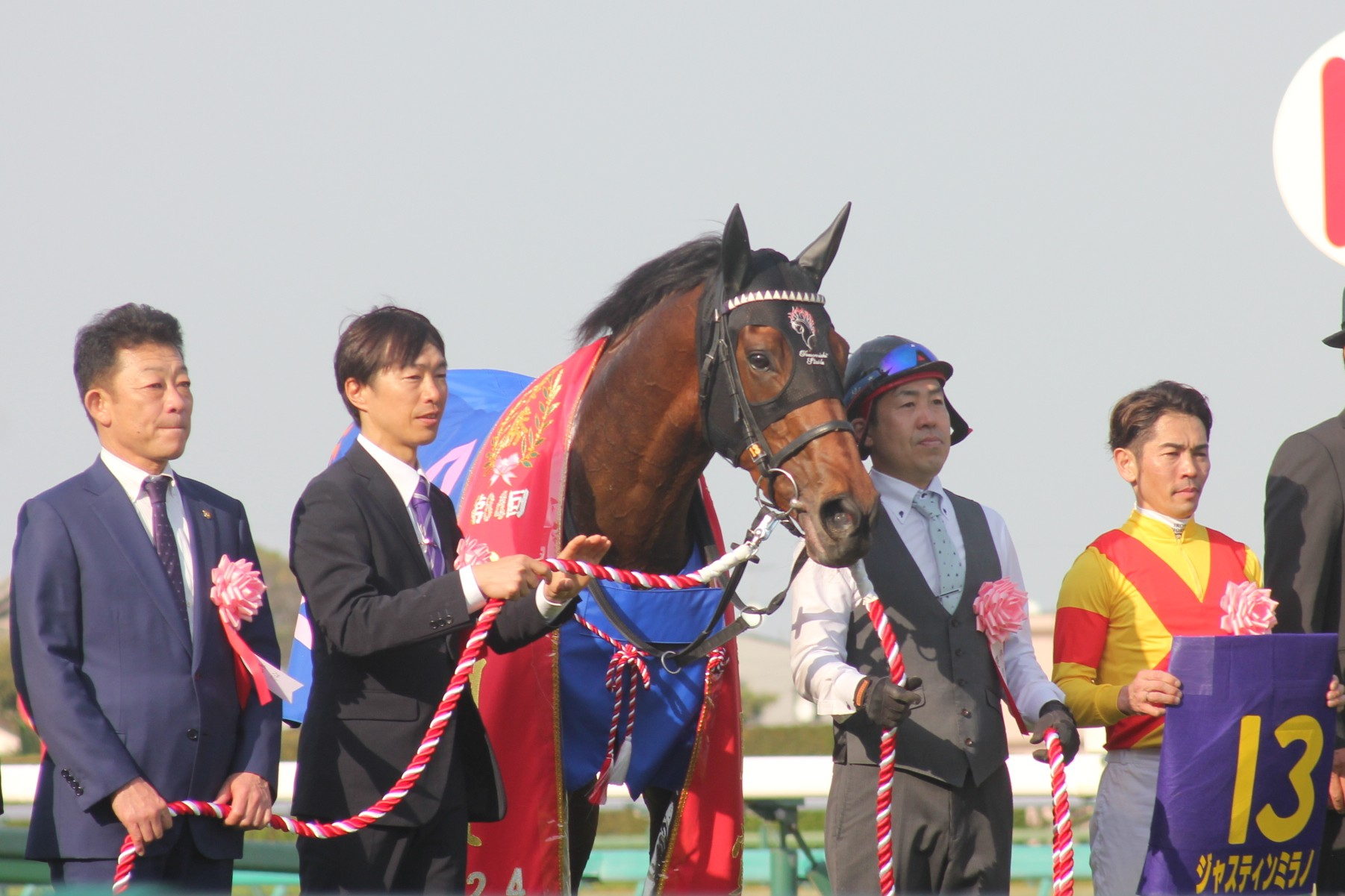
Justin Milano with his connections right after winning Satsuki Sho.

After the Tōkyō Yūshun, it was initially announced that the horse would be entered into the Autumn Tenno Sho rather than the Kikuka-shō, the third leg of the Triple Crown. However, while the horse was being prepared for the race, it was discovered that the horse had developed tendinitis, leading to the plan being scrapped. It was ultimately decided on November 14 that the horse would be retired to stand stud at the Breeders Stallion Station in Hidaka, Hokkaido.

== Racing statistics ==
Below data is based on data available on JBIS Search, and NetKeiba.

Date	Track	Race	Grade	Distance (Condition)	Entry	HN	Odds (Favored)	Finish	Time	Margins	Jockey	Winner (Runner-up)
2023 – two-year-old season
Nov 18	Tokyo	2yo Newcomer		2,000 m (Firm)	14	11	3.5 (2)	1st	2:02.0	-0.3	Tom Marquand	(Redentor)
2024 – three-year-old season
Feb 11	Tokyo	Kyodo Tsushin Hai	3	1,800 m (Firm)	10	8	6.6 (4)	1st	1:48.0	-0.2	Keita Tosaki	(Jantar Mantar)
Apr 14	Nakayama	Satsuki Shō	1	2,000 m (Firm)	17	13	4.8 (2)	1st	1:57.1 (Note: Set a track record for the event)	0.0	Keita Tosaki	(Cosmo Kuranda)
May 26	Tokyo	Tōkyō Yūshun	1	2,400 m (Firm)	17	15	2.2 (1)	2nd	2:24.7	0.4	Keita Tosaki	Danon Decile

Legend:
Turf

== Pedigree ==
Pedigree of Justin Milano (JPN), bay colt, 2021
Sire Kizuna br. 2010	Deep Impact b. 2002	Sunday Silence (USA)	Halo
Sire Kizuna br. 2010	Deep Impact b. 2002	Sunday Silence (USA)	Wishing Well
Sire Kizuna br. 2010	Deep Impact b. 2002	Wind in Her Hair (IRE)	Alzao (USA)
Sire Kizuna br. 2010	Deep Impact b. 2002	Wind in Her Hair (IRE)	Burghclere (GB)
Sire Kizuna br. 2010	Catequil (CAN) b. 1990	Storm Cat (USA)	Storm Bird (CAN)
Sire Kizuna br. 2010	Catequil (CAN) b. 1990	Storm Cat (USA)	Terlingua
Sire Kizuna br. 2010	Catequil (CAN) b. 1990	Pacific Princess (USA)	Damascus
Sire Kizuna br. 2010	Catequil (CAN) b. 1990	Pacific Princess (USA)	Fiji (GB)
Dam Margot Did (IRE) b. 2008	Exceed And Excel (AUS) b. 2000	Danehill (USA)	Danzig
Dam Margot Did (IRE) b. 2008	Exceed And Excel (AUS) b. 2000	Danehill (USA)	Razyana
Dam Margot Did (IRE) b. 2008	Exceed And Excel (AUS) b. 2000	Patrona (USA)	Lomond
Dam Margot Did (IRE) b. 2008	Exceed And Excel (AUS) b. 2000	Patrona (USA)	Gladiolus
Dam Margot Did (IRE) b. 2008	Special Dancer (GB) b. 1997	Shareef Dancer (USA)	Northern Dancer (CAN)
Dam Margot Did (IRE) b. 2008	Special Dancer (GB) b. 1997	Shareef Dancer (USA)	Sweet Alliance
Dam Margot Did (IRE) b. 2008	Special Dancer (GB) b. 1997	Caraniya (IRE)	Darshaan (GB)
Dam Margot Did (IRE) b. 2008	Special Dancer (GB) b. 1997	Caraniya (IRE)	Callianire (GB) (Family: 13-c)
